= List of airports by IATA code: Y =

IATA	ICAO	Airport name	Location served
-YA-
YAA		Anahim Lake Airport (TC: CAJ4)	Anahim Lake, British Columbia, Canada
YAB	CYAB	Arctic Bay Airport (TC: CJX7)	Arctic Bay, Nunavut, Canada
YAC	CYAC	Cat Lake Airport	Cat Lake, Ontario, Canada
YAD		Moose Lake Airport (TC: CJB4)	Moose Lake, Manitoba, Canada
YAG	CYAG	Fort Frances Municipal Airport	Fort Frances, Ontario, Canada
YAH	CYAH	La Grande-4 Airport	La Grande-4, Quebec, Canada
YAI	SCCH	General Bernardo O'Higgins Airport	Chillán, Chile
YAJ		Lyall Harbour Seaplane Base	Saturna Island, British Columbia, Canada
YAK	PAYA	Yakutat Airport	Yakutat, Alaska, United States
YAL	CYAL	Alert Bay Airport	Alert Bay, British Columbia, Canada
YAM	CYAM	Sault Ste. Marie Airport	Sault Ste. Marie, Ontario, Canada
YAN	FZIR	Yangambi Airport	Yangambi, Democratic Republic of the Congo
YAO	FKKY	Yaoundé Airport	Yaoundé, Cameroon
YAP	PTYA	Yap International Airport (FAA: T11)	Yap, Federated States of Micronesia
YAQ		Maple Bay Seaplane Base	Maple Bay, British Columbia, Canada
YAR	CYAD	La Grande-3 Airport	La Grande-3, Quebec, Canada
YAS	NFSW	Yasawa Island Airport	Yasawa, Fiji
YAT	CYAT	Attawapiskat Airport	Attawapiskat, Ontario, Canada
YAU		Kattiniq/Donaldson Airport (TC: CTP9)	Raglan Mine, Quebec, Canada
YAV		Mayne Island Water Aerodrome (Miner's Bay Seaplane Base) (TC: CAW7)	Mayne Island, British Columbia, Canada
YAX		Angling Lake/Wapekeka Airport (TC: CKB6)	Wapekeka, Ontario, Canada
YAY	CYAY	St. Anthony Airport	St. Anthony, Newfoundland and Labrador, Canada
YAZ	CYAZ	Tofino-Long Beach Airport	Tofino, British Columbia, Canada
-YB-
YBA	CYBA	Banff Airport	Banff, Alberta, Canada
YBB	CYBB	Kugaaruk Airport	Kugaaruk, Nunavut, Canada
YBC	CYBC	Baie-Comeau Airport	Baie-Comeau, Quebec, Canada
YBE	CYBE	Uranium City Airport	Uranium City, Saskatchewan, Canada
YBF		Bamfield Water Aerodrome (TC: CAE9)	Bamfield, British Columbia, Canada
YBG	CYBG	Canadian Forces Base Bagotville	La Baie (Bagotville), Quebec, Canada
YBH	CYBH	Bull Harbour Waterdrome	Bull Harbour, British Columbia, Canada
YBI		Black Tickle Airport (TC: CCE4)	Black Tickle, Newfoundland and Labrador, Canada
YBJ		Baie-Johan-Beetz Seaplane Base	Baie-Johan-Beetz, Quebec, Canada
YBK	CYBK	Baker Lake Airport	Baker Lake, Nunavut, Canada
YBL	CYBL	Campbell River Airport	Campbell River, British Columbia, Canada
YBO		Bob Quinn Lake Airport (TC: CBW4)	Bob Quinn Lake, British Columbia, Canada
YBP	ZUYB	Yibin Wuliangye Airport	Yibin, Sichuan, China
YBQ		Telegraph Harbour Seaplane Base	Thetis Island, British Columbia, Canada
YBR	CYBR	Brandon Municipal Airport (McGill Field)	Brandon, Manitoba, Canada
YBS		Opapimiskan Lake Airport (TC: CKM8)	Opapimiskan Lake, Ontario, Canada
YBT	CYBT	Brochet Airport	Brochet, Manitoba, Canada
YBV	CYBV	Berens River Airport	Berens River, Manitoba, Canada
YBW		Bedwell Harbour Water Aerodrome (TC: CAB3)	Bedwell Harbour, British Columbia, Canada
YBX	CYBX	Lourdes-de-Blanc-Sablon Airport	Blanc-Sablon, Quebec, Canada
YBY	CYBF	Bonnyville Airport	Bonnyville, Alberta, Canada
-YC-
YCA		Courtenay Airpark (TC: CAH3)	Courtenay, British Columbia, Canada
YCB	CYCB	Cambridge Bay Airport	Cambridge Bay, Nunavut, Canada
YCC	CYCC	Cornwall Regional Airport	Cornwall, Ontario, Canada
YCD	CYCD	Nanaimo Airport	Nanaimo, British Columbia, Canada
YCE	CYCE	Centralia/James T. Field Memorial Aerodrome	Centralia, Ontario, Canada
YCF		Cortes Island Aerodrome (TC: CCI9)	Cortes Island, British Columbia, Canada
YCG	CYCG	West Kootenay Regional Airport (Castlegar Airport)	Castlegar, British Columbia, Canada
YCH	CYCH	Miramichi Airport	Miramichi, New Brunswick, Canada
YCK	CYVL	Colville Lake/Tommy Kochon Aerodrome	Colville Lake, Northwest Territories, Canada
YCL	CYCL	Charlo Airport	Charlo, New Brunswick, Canada
YCM	CYSN	St. Catharines/Niagara District Airport	St. Catharines, Ontario, Canada
YCN	CYCN	Cochrane Aerodrome	Cochrane, Ontario, Canada
YCO	CYCO	Kugluktuk Airport	Kugluktuk, Nunavut, Canada
YCQ	CYCQ	Chetwynd Airport	Chetwynd, British Columbia, Canada
YCR	CYCR	Cross Lake (Charlie Sinclair Memorial) Airport	Cross Lake, Manitoba, Canada
YCS	CYCS	Chesterfield Inlet Airport	Chesterfield Inlet, Nunavut, Canada
YCT	CYCT	Coronation Airport	Coronation, Alberta, Canada
YCU	ZBYC	Yuncheng Guangong Airport	Yuncheng, Shanxi, China
YCW	CYCW	Chilliwack Airport	Chilliwack, British Columbia, Canada
YCY	CYCY	Clyde River Airport	Clyde River, Nunavut, Canada
YCZ	CYCZ	Fairmont Hot Springs Airport	Fairmont Hot Springs, British Columbia, Canada
-YD-
YDA	CYDA	Dawson City Airport	Dawson City, Yukon, Canada
YDB	CYDB	Burwash Airport	Burwash Landing, Yukon, Canada
YDC		Drayton Valley Industrial Airport (TC: CER3)	Drayton Valley, Alberta, Canada
YDE		Paradise River Airport (TC: CDF4)	Paradise River, Newfoundland and Labrador, Canada
YDF	CYDF	Deer Lake Regional Airport	Deer Lake, Newfoundland and Labrador, Canada
YDG	CYID	Digby/Annapolis Regional Airport	Digby, Nova Scotia, Canada
YDJ		Hatchet Lake Airport (TC: CJL2)	Hatchet Lake, Saskatchewan, Canada
YDL	CYDL	Dease Lake Airport	Dease Lake, British Columbia, Canada
YDN	CYDN	Lt. Col W.G. (Billy) Barker VC Airport	Dauphin, Manitoba, Canada
YDO	CYDO	Dolbeau-Saint-Félicien Airport	Dolbeau-Mistassini, Quebec, Canada
YDP	CYDP	Nain Airport	Nain, Newfoundland and Labrador, Canada
YDQ	CYDQ	Dawson Creek Airport	Dawson Creek, British Columbia, Canada
YDT	CZBB	Boundary Bay Airport	Vancouver, British Columbia, Canada
YDU		Kasba Lake Airport (TC: CJL8)	Kasba Lake, Northwest Territories, Canada
YDV	CZTA	Bloodvein River Airport	Bloodvein, Manitoba, Canada
YDW		Obre Lake/North of Sixty Airport (TC: CKV4)	Obre Lake, Northwest Territories, Canada
-YE-
YEA		metropolitan area^{1}	Edmonton, Alberta, Canada
YEB		Bar River Airport (TC: CPF2)	Bar River, Ontario, Canada
YEC	RKTY	Yecheon Air Base	Yecheon, South Korea
YEG	CYEG	Edmonton International Airport	Edmonton, Alberta, Canada
YEI	LTBR	Yenişehir Airport	Bursa, Turkey
YEK	CYEK	Arviat Airport	Arviat, Nunavut, Canada
YEL	CYEL	Elliot Lake Municipal Airport	Elliot Lake, Ontario, Canada
YEM	CYEM	Manitowaning/Manitoulin East Municipal Airport	Manitowaning, Ontario, Canada
YEN	CYEN	Estevan Regional Aerodrome	Estevan, Saskatchewan, Canada
YEO	EGDY	Royal Naval Air Station Yeovilton	Yeovilton, England, United Kingdom
YEQ		Yankisa Airport	Yankisa, Papua New Guinea
YER	CYER	Fort Severn Airport	Fort Severn, Ontario, Canada
YES	OISY	Yasuj Airport	Yasuj (Yasouj), Iran
YET	CYET	Edson Airport	Edson, Alberta, Canada
YEU	CYEU	Eureka Aerodrome	Eureka, Nunavut, Canada
YEV	CYEV	Inuvik (Mike Zubko) Airport	Inuvik, Northwest Territories, Canada
YEY	CYEY	Amos/Magny Airport	Amos, Quebec, Canada
-YF-
YFA	CYFA	Fort Albany Airport	Fort Albany, Ontario, Canada
YFB	CYFB	Iqaluit Airport	Iqaluit, Nunavut, Canada
YFC	CYFC	Fredericton International Airport	Fredericton, New Brunswick, Canada
YFE	CYFE	Forestville Airport	Forestville, Quebec, Canada
YFG		Fontanges Airport (TC: CTU2)	Fontanges, Quebec, Canada
YFH	CYFH	Fort Hope Airport	Eabametoong (Fort Hope), Ontario, Canada
YFI		Fort MacKay/Firebag Aerodrome (TC: CFG6)	Fort McKay, Alberta, Canada
YFJ	CYWE	Wekweètì Airport (Snare Lake Airport) (TC: CFJ7)	Wekweeti, Northwest Territories, Canada
YFL		Fort Reliance Water Aerodrome (CJN8)	Fort Reliance, Northwest Territories, Canada
YFO	CYFO	Flin Flon Airport	Flin Flon, Manitoba, Canada
YFR	CYFR	Fort Resolution Airport	Fort Resolution, Northwest Territories, Canada
YFS	CYFS	Fort Simpson Airport	Fort Simpson, Northwest Territories, Canada
YFT		Taipa Ferry Terminal	Taipa, Macau
YFX		St. Lewis (Fox Harbour) Airport (TC: CCK4)	St. Lewis, Newfoundland and Labrador, Canada
-YG-
YGB	CYGB	Texada/Gillies Bay Airport	Gillies Bay, British Columbia, Canada
YGC		Grande Cache Airport (TC: CEQ5)	Grande Cache, Alberta, Canada
YGE		Gorge Harbour Water Aerodrome	Gorge Harbour, British Columbia, Canada
YGG		Ganges Water Aerodrome (TC: CAX6)	Ganges, British Columbia, Canada
YGH	CYGH	Fort Good Hope Airport	Fort Good Hope, Northwest Territories, Canada
YGJ	RJOH	Miho–Yonago Airport	Yonago, Honshu, Japan
YGK	CYGK	Kingston/Norman Rogers Airport	Kingston, Ontario, Canada
YGL	CYGL	La Grande Rivière Airport	Radisson, Quebec, Canada
YGM	CYGM	Gimli Industrial Park Airport	Gimli, Manitoba, Canada
YGN		Greenway Sound Water Aerodrome	Greenway Sound, British Columbia, Canada
YGO	CYGO	Gods Lake Narrows Airport	Gods Lake Narrows, Manitoba, Canada
YGP	CYGP	Michel-Pouliot Gaspé Airport	Gaspé, Quebec, Canada
YGQ	CYGQ	Geraldton (Greenstone Regional) Airport	Greenstone (Geraldton), Ontario, Canada
YGR	CYGR	Îles-de-la-Madeleine Airport	Les Îles-de-la-Madeleine, Quebec, Canada
YGT	CYGT	Igloolik Airport	Igloolik, Nunavut, Canada
YGV	CYGV	Havre Saint-Pierre Airport	Havre-Saint-Pierre, Quebec, Canada
YGW	CYGW	Kuujjuarapik Airport	Kuujjuarapik, Quebec, Canada
YGX	CYGX	Gillam Airport	Gillam, Manitoba, Canada
YGZ	CYGZ	Grise Fiord Airport	Grise Fiord, Nunavut, Canada
-YH-
YHA		Port Hope Simpson Airport (TC: CCP4)	Port Hope Simpson, Newfoundland and Labrador, Canada
YHB	CYHB	Hudson Bay Airport	Hudson Bay, Saskatchewan, Canada
YHC		Hakai Passage Water Aerodrome	Hakai Passage, British Columbia, Canada
YHD	CYHD	Dryden Regional Airport	Dryden, Ontario, Canada
YHE	CYHE	Hope Aerodrome	Hope, British Columbia, Canada
YHF	CYHF	Hearst (René Fontaine) Municipal Airport	Hearst, Ontario, Canada
YHG		Charlottetown Airport (TC: CCH4)	Charlottetown, Newfoundland and Labrador, Canada
YHH		Campbell River Water Aerodrome (TC: CAE3)	Campbell River, British Columbia, Canada
YHI	CYHI	Ulukhaktok/Holman Airport	Ulukhaktok, Northwest Territories, Canada
YHK	CYHK	Gjoa Haven Airport	Gjoa Haven, Nunavut, Canada
YHM	CYHM	John C. Munro Hamilton International Airport	Hamilton, Ontario, Canada
YHN	CYHN	Hornepayne Municipal Airport	Hornepayne, Ontario, Canada
YHO	CYHO	Hopedale Airport	Hopedale, Newfoundland and Labrador, Canada
YHP	CYHP	Poplar Hill Airport	Poplar Hill, Ontario, Canada
YHR	CYHR	Chevery Airport	Chevery, Quebec, Canada
YHS	CYHS	Saugeen Municipal Airport	Walkerton, Ontario, Canada
YHT	CYHT	Haines Junction Airport	Haines Junction, Yukon, Canada
YHU	CYHU	Montréal/Saint-Hubert Airport	Montreal, Quebec, Canada
YHY	CYHY	Hay River/Merlyn Carter Airport	Hay River, Northwest Territories, Canada
YHZ	CYHZ	Halifax Stanfield International Airport	Halifax, Nova Scotia, Canada
-YI-
YIA	WAHI	Yogyakarta International Airport	Kulon Progo Regency, Special Region of Yogyakarta, Indonesia
YIB	CYIB	Atikokan Municipal Airport	Atikokan, Ontario, Canada
YIC	ZSYC	Yichun Mingyueshan Airport	Yichun, Jiangxi, China
YIE	ZBES	Arxan Yi'ershi Airport	Arxan (Aershan), Inner Mongolia, China
YIF	CYIF	Saint-Augustin Airport	Saint-Augustin / Pakuashipi, Quebec, Canada
YIG		Big Bay Water Aerodrome (TC: CAF6)	Stuart Island, British Columbia, Canada
YIH	ZHYC	Yichang Sanxia Airport	Yichang, Hubei, China
YIK	CYIK	Ivujivik Airport	Ivujivik, Quebec, Canada
YIN	ZWYN	Yining Airport	Yining (Ghulja), Xinjiang, China
YIO	CYIO	Pond Inlet Airport	Pond Inlet, Nunavut, Canada
YIP	KYIP	Willow Run Airport	Detroit, Michigan, United States
YIV	CYIV	Island Lake Airport (Garden Hill Airport)	Island Lake / Garden Hill, Manitoba, Canada
YIW	ZSYW	Yiwu Airport	Yiwu, Zhejiang, China
-YJ-
YJA	CYJA	Jasper Airport	Jasper, Alberta, Canada
YJF	CYJF	Fort Liard Airport	Fort Liard, Northwest Territories, Canada
YJN	CYJN	Saint-Jean Airport	Saint-Jean-sur-Richelieu, Quebec, Canada
YJP		Hinton/Jasper-Hinton Airport (TC: CEC4)	Hinton, Alberta, Canada
YJS	ZKSE	Samjiyon Airport	Samjiyon, North Korea
YJT	CYJT	Stephenville International Airport	Stephenville, Newfoundland and Labrador, Canada
-YK-
YKA	CYKA	Kamloops Airport	Kamloops, British Columbia, Canada
YKC	CYKC	Collins Bay Airport	Collins Bay, Saskatchewan, Canada
YKD	CYKM	Kincardine Municipal Airport	Kincardine, Ontario, Canada
YKE		Knee Lake Airport (TC: CJT3)	Knee Lake, Manitoba, Canada
YKF	CYKF	Region of Waterloo International Airport	Kitchener / Cambridge / Waterloo, Ontario, Canada
YKG	CYAS	Kangirsuk Airport	Kangirsuk, Quebec, Canada
YKH	ZYYK	Yingkou Lanqi Airport	Yingkou, Liaoning, China
YKJ	CYKJ	Key Lake Airport	Key Lake, Saskatchewan, Canada
YKK		Kitkatla Water Aerodrome (TC: CAP7)	Kitkatla, British Columbia, Canada
YKL	CYKL	Schefferville Airport	Schefferville, Quebec, Canada
YKM	KYKM	Yakima Air Terminal (McAllister Field)	Yakima, Washington, United States
YKN	KYKN	Chan Gurney Municipal Airport	Yankton, South Dakota, United States
YKO	LTCW	Hakkari Yüksekova Airport	Hakkâri / Yüksekova, Turkey
YKQ	CYKQ	Waskaganish Airport	Waskaganish, Quebec, Canada
YKS	UEEE	Yakutsk Airport	Yakutsk, Yakutia, Russia
YKT		Klemtu Water Aerodrome	Klemtu, British Columbia, Canada
YKU		Chisasibi Airport (TC: CSU2)	Chisasibi, Quebec, Canada
YKX	CYKX	Kirkland Lake Airport	Kirkland Lake, Ontario, Canada
YKY	CYKY	Kindersley Regional Airport	Kindersley, Saskatchewan, Canada
-YL-
YLB	CYLB	Lac La Biche Airport	Lac La Biche, Alberta, Canada
YLC	CYLC	Kimmirut Airport	Kimmirut, Nunavut, Canada
YLD	CYLD	Chapleau Airport	Chapleau, Ontario, Canada
YLE		Whatì Airport (TC: CEM3)	Whatì, Northwest Territories, Canada
YLG	YYAL	Yalgoo Airport	Yalgoo, Western Australia, Australia
YLH	CYLH	Lansdowne House Airport	Neskantaga (Lansdowne House Indian Band), Ontario, Canada
YLI	EFYL	Ylivieska Airfield	Ylivieska, Finland
YLJ	CYLJ	Meadow Lake Airport	Meadow Lake, Saskatchewan, Canada
YLK	CYLS	Lake Simcoe Regional Airport	Barrie / Orillia, Ontario, Canada
YLL	CYLL	Lloydminster Airport	Lloydminster, Alberta/Saskatchewan,^{2} Canada
YLM		Clinton Creek Airport	Clinton Creek, Yukon, Canada
YLN	ZYYL	Yilan Airport	Yilan, Heilongjiang, China
YLP	CYLP	Mingan Airport	Longue-Pointe-de-Mingan, Quebec, Canada
YLQ	CYLQ	La Tuque Airport	La Tuque, Quebec, Canada
YLR	CYLR	Leaf Rapids Airport	Leaf Rapids, Manitoba, Canada
YLS		Lebel-sur-Quévillon Airport (TC: CSH4)	Lebel-sur-Quévillon, Quebec, Canada
YLT	CYLT	Alert Airport	Alert, Nunavut, Canada
YLV	UBEE	Yevlakh Airport	Yevlakh, Azerbaijan
YLW	CYLW	Kelowna International Airport	Kelowna, British Columbia, Canada
YLX		Yulin Fumian Airport	Yulin, Guangxi, China
YLY	CYNJ	Langley Regional Airport	Langley, British Columbia, Canada
-YM-
YMA	CYMA	Mayo Airport	Mayo, Yukon, Canada
YMB		Merritt Airport (TC: CAD5)	Merritt, British Columbia, Canada
YMD	CYMD	Mould Bay Airport	Prince Patrick Island, Northwest Territories, Canada
YME	CYME	Matane Airport	Matane, Quebec, Canada
YMF		Montague Harbour Water Aerodrome	Galiano Island, British Columbia, Canada
YMG	CYMG	Manitouwadge Airport	Manitouwadge, Ontario, Canada
YMH	CYMH	Mary's Harbour Airport	Mary's Harbour, Newfoundland and Labrador, Canada
YMJ	CYMJ	CFB Moose Jaw (C.M. McEwen Airport)	Moose Jaw, Saskatchewan, Canada
YMK	USDK	Mys-Kamenny Airport	Mys-Kamenny, Yamalo-Nenets Autonomous Okrug, Russia
YML	CYML	Charlevoix Airport	La Malbaie, Quebec, Canada
YMM	CYMM	Fort McMurray International Airport	Fort McMurray, Alberta, Canada
YMN	CYFT	Makkovik Airport	Makkovik, Newfoundland and Labrador, Canada
YMO	CYMO	Moosonee Airport	Moosonee, Ontario, Canada
YMP		Port McNeill Airport (TC: CAT5)	Port McNeill, British Columbia, Canada
YMQ		metropolitan area^{3}	Montreal, Quebec, Canada
YMS	SPMS	Moisés Benzaquén Rengifo Airport	Yurimaguas, Peru
YMT	CYMT	Chibougamau/Chapais Airport	Chibougamau, Quebec, Canada
YMU		Mansons Landing Water Aerodrome (TC: CAV7)	Mansons Landing, British Columbia, Canada
YMV		Mary River Aerodrome (TC: CMR2)	Mary River, Nunavut, Canada
YMW	CYMW	Maniwaki Airport	Maniwaki, Quebec, Canada
YMX	CYMX	Montréal–Mirabel International Airport	Montreal, Quebec, Canada
-YN-
YNA	CYNA	Natashquan Airport	Natashquan, Quebec, Canada
YNB	OEYN	Yanbu Airport (Yenbo Airport)	Yanbu al Bahr (Yenbo), Saudi Arabia
YNC	CYNC	Wemindji Airport	Wemindji, Quebec, Canada
YND	CYND	Gatineau-Ottawa Executive Airport	Gatineau / Ottawa (ON), Quebec, Canada
YNE	CYNE	Norway House Airport	Norway House, Manitoba, Canada
YNG	KYNG	Youngstown–Warren Regional Airport	Youngstown / Warren, Ohio, United States
YNH	CYNH	Hudson's Hope Airport	Hudson's Hope, British Columbia, Canada
YNJ	ZYYJ	Yanji Chaoyangchuan Airport	Yanji, Jilin, China
YNL	CYNL	Points North Landing Airport	Points North Landing, Saskatchewan, Canada
YNM	CYNM	Matagami Airport	Matagami, Quebec, Canada
YNN		Yandicoogina Airport	Yandicoogina, Western Australia, Australia
YNO		North Spirit Lake Airport (TC: CKQ3)	North Spirit Lake, Ontario, Canada
YNP		Natuashish Airport (TC: CNH2)	Natuashish, Newfoundland and Labrador, Canada
YNS	CYHH	Nemiscau Airport	Nemiscau, Quebec, Canada
YNT	ZSYT	Yantai Penglai International Airport	Yantai, Shandong, China
YNX		Snap Lake Airport (TC: CSK6)	Snap Lake, Northwest Territories, Canada
YNY	RKNY	Yangyang International Airport	Yangyang, South Korea
YNZ	ZSYN	Yancheng Nanyang International Airport	Yancheng, Jiangsu, China
-YO-
YOA	CYOA	Ekati Airport	Ekati, Northwest Territories, Canada
YOC	CYOC	Old Crow Airport	Old Crow, Yukon, Canada
YOD	CYOD	CFB Cold Lake (R.W. McNair Airport)	Cold Lake, Alberta, Canada
YOE		Donnelly Airport (TC: CFM4)	Donnelly, Alberta, Canada
YOG	CYKP	Ogoki Post Airport	Marten Falls (Ogoki), Ontario, Canada
YOH	CYOH	Oxford House Airport	Oxford House, Manitoba, Canada
YOJ	CYOJ	High Level Airport	High Level, Alberta, Canada
YOL	DNYO	Yola Airport	Yola, Nigeria
YON	VQTY	Yongphulla Airport (Yonphula Airport)	Trashigang, Bhutan
YOO	CYOO	Oshawa Airport	Oshawa, Ontario, Canada
YOP	CYOP	Rainbow Lake Airport	Rainbow Lake, Alberta, Canada
YOS	CYOS	Billy Bishop Regional Airport	Owen Sound, Ontario, Canada
YOT	LLYT	Yotvata Airfield	Yotvata, Israel
YOW	CYOW	Ottawa Macdonald–Cartier International Airport	Ottawa, Ontario, Canada
-YP-
YPA	CYPA	Prince Albert (Glass Field) Airport	Prince Albert, Saskatchewan, Canada
YPB		Alberni Valley Regional Airport (TC: CBS8)	Port Alberni, British Columbia, Canada
YPC	CYPC	Nora Aliqatchialuk Ruben Airport	Paulatuk, Northwest Territories, Canada
YPD		Parry Sound Area Municipal Airport (TC: CNK4)	Parry Sound, Ontario, Canada
YPE	CYPE	Peace River Airport	Peace River, Alberta, Canada
YPG	CYPG	Portage la Prairie/Southport Airport	Portage la Prairie, Manitoba, Canada
YPH	CYPH	Inukjuak Airport	Inukjuak, Quebec, Canada
YPI		Port Simpson Water Aerodrome (TC: CAN8)	Lax Kw'alaams (Port Simpson), British Columbia, Canada
YPJ	CYLA	Aupaluk Airport	Aupaluk, Quebec, Canada
YPL	CYPL	Pickle Lake Airport	Pickle Lake, Ontario, Canada
YPM	CYPM	Pikangikum Airport	Pikangikum, Ontario, Canada
YPN	CYPN	Port-Menier Airport	Port-Menier, Quebec, Canada
YPO	CYPO	Peawanuck Airport	Peawanuck, Ontario, Canada
YPQ	CYPQ	Peterborough Airport	Peterborough, Ontario, Canada
YPR	CYPR	Prince Rupert Airport	Prince Rupert, British Columbia, Canada
YPS	CYPD	Port Hawkesbury Airport	Port Hawkesbury, Nova Scotia, Canada
YPT		Pender Harbour Water Aerodrome (TC: CAG8)	Pender Harbour, British Columbia, Canada
YPW	CYPW	Powell River Airport	Powell River, British Columbia, Canada
YPX	CYPX	Puvirnituq Airport	Puvirnituq, Quebec, Canada
YPY	CYPY	Fort Chipewyan Airport	Fort Chipewyan, Alberta, Canada
YPZ	CYPZ	Burns Lake Airport	Burns Lake, British Columbia, Canada
-YQ-
YQA	CYQA	Muskoka Airport	Muskoka, Ontario, Canada
YQB	CYQB	Québec City Jean Lesage International Airport	Quebec City, Quebec, Canada
YQC	CYHA	Quaqtaq Airport	Quaqtaq, Quebec, Canada
YQD	CYQD	The Pas Airport	The Pas, Manitoba, Canada
YQF	CYQF	Red Deer Regional Airport	Red Deer, Alberta, Canada
YQG	CYQG	Windsor International Airport	Windsor, Ontario, Canada
YQH	CYQH	Watson Lake Airport	Watson Lake, Yukon, Canada
YQI	CYQI	Yarmouth Airport	Yarmouth, Nova Scotia, Canada
YQJ		April Point Water Aerodrome	Quadra Island, British Columbia, Canada
YQK	CYQK	Kenora Airport	Kenora, Ontario, Canada
YQL	CYQL	Lethbridge Airport	Lethbridge, Alberta, Canada
YQM	CYQM	Greater Moncton International Airport	Moncton, New Brunswick, Canada
YQN	CYQN	Nakina Airport	Greenstone (Nakina), Ontario, Canada
YQQ	CYQQ	CFB Comox	Comox, British Columbia, Canada
YQR	CYQR	Regina International Airport	Regina, Saskatchewan, Canada
YQS	CYQS	St. Thomas Municipal Airport	St. Thomas, Ontario, Canada
YQT	CYQT	Thunder Bay International Airport	Thunder Bay, Ontario, Canada
YQU	CYQU	Grande Prairie Airport	Grande Prairie, Alberta, Canada
YQV	CYQV	Yorkton Municipal Airport	Yorkton, Saskatchewan, Canada
YQW	CYQW	North Battleford Airport (Cameron McIntosh Airport)	North Battleford, Saskatchewan, Canada
YQX	CYQX	Gander International Airport / CFB Gander	Gander, Newfoundland and Labrador, Canada
YQY	CYQY	Sydney/J.A. Douglas McCurdy Airport	Sydney, Nova Scotia, Canada
YQZ	CYQZ	Quesnel Airport	Quesnel, British Columbia, Canada
-YR-
YRA	CYRA	Gamètì/Rae Lakes Airport	Gamèti, Northwest Territories, Canada
YRB	CYRB	Resolute Bay Airport	Resolute, Nunavut, Canada
YRC		Refuge Cove Water Aerodrome	Refuge Cove, British Columbia, Canada
YRD		Dean River Airport	Dean River, British Columbia, Canada
YRF	CYCA	Cartwright Airport	Cartwright, Newfoundland and Labrador, Canada
YRG		Rigolet Airport (TC: CCZ2)	Rigolet, Newfoundland and Labrador, Canada
YRI	CYRI	Rivière-du-Loup Airport	Rivière-du-Loup, Quebec, Canada
YRJ	CYRJ	Roberval Airport	Roberval, Quebec, Canada
YRL	CYRL	Red Lake Airport	Red Lake, Ontario, Canada
YRM	CYRM	Rocky Mountain House Airport	Rocky Mountain House, Alberta, Canada
YRN		Rivers Inlet Water Aerodrome (TC: CAU8)	Rivers Inlet, British Columbia, Canada
YRO	CYRO	Ottawa/Rockcliffe Airport	Ottawa, Ontario, Canada
YRQ	CYRQ	Trois-Rivières Airport	Trois-Rivières, Quebec, Canada
YRR		Stuart Island Airstrip	Stuart Island, British Columbia, Canada
YRS	CYRS	Red Sucker Lake Airport	Red Sucker Lake, Manitoba, Canada
YRT	CYRT	Rankin Inlet Airport	Rankin Inlet, Nunavut, Canada
YRV	CYRV	Revelstoke Airport	Revelstoke, British Columbia, Canada
-YS-
YSA		Sable Island Aerodrome	Sable Island, Nova Scotia, Canada
YSB	CYSB	Sudbury Airport	Greater Sudbury, Ontario, Canada
YSC	CYSC	Sherbrooke Airport	Sherbrooke, Quebec, Canada
YSE	CYSE	Squamish Airport	Squamish, British Columbia, Canada
YSF	CYSF	Stony Rapids Airport	Stony Rapids, Saskatchewan, Canada
YSG	CYLK	Lutselk'e Airport	Lutselk'e, Northwest Territories, Canada
YSH	CYSH	Smiths Falls-Montague Airport	Smiths Falls, Ontario, Canada
YSI		Parry Sound/Frying Pan Island-Sans Souci Water Aerodrome (TC: CPS9)	Fryingpan Island, Ontario, Canada
YSJ	CYSJ	Saint John Airport	Saint John, New Brunswick, Canada
YSK	CYSK	Sanikiluaq Airport	Sanikiluaq, Nunavut, Canada
YSL	CYSL	Saint-Léonard Aerodrome	Saint-Léonard, New Brunswick, Canada
YSM	CYSM	Fort Smith Airport	Fort Smith, Northwest Territories, Canada
YSN	CZAM	Salmon Arm Airport	Salmon Arm, British Columbia, Canada
YSO		Postville Airport (TC: CCD4)	Postville, Newfoundland and Labrador, Canada
YSP	CYSP	Marathon Aerodrome	Marathon, Ontario, Canada
YSQ	ZYSQ	Songyuan Chaganhu Airport	Songyuan, Jilin, China
YST	CYST	St. Theresa Point Airport	St. Theresa Point, Manitoba, Canada
YSU	CYSU	Summerside Airport	Summerside, Prince Edward Island, Canada
YSX		Bella Bella/Shearwater Water Aerodrome (TC: CAW8)	Bella Bella, British Columbia, Canada
YSY	CYSY	Sachs Harbour (David Nasogaluak Jr. Saaryuaq) Airport	Sachs Harbour, Northwest Territories, Canada
-YT-
YTA	CYTA	Pembroke Airport	Pembroke, Ontario, Canada
YTB		Hartley Bay Water Aerodrome (TC: CAY4)	Hartley Bay, British Columbia, Canada
YTD	CZLQ	Thicket Portage Airport	Thicket Portage, Manitoba, Canada
YTE	CYTE	Kinngait Airport	Kinngait, Nunavut, Canada
YTF	CYTF	Alma Airport	Alma, Quebec, Canada
YTG		Sullivan Bay Water Aerodrome (TC: CAV5)	Sullivan Bay, British Columbia, Canada
YTH	CYTH	Thompson Airport	Thompson, Manitoba, Canada
YTL	CYTL	Big Trout Lake Airport	Kitchenuhmaykoosib Inninuwug (Big Trout Lake), Ontario, Canada
YTM	CYFJ	Mont Tremblant International Airport	Mont-Tremblant, Quebec, Canada
YTO		metropolitan area^{4}	Toronto, Ontario, Canada
YTP		Tofino Harbour Water Aerodrome (TC: CAB4)	Tofino, British Columbia, Canada
YTQ	CYTQ	Tasiujaq Airport	Tasiujaq, Quebec, Canada
YTR	CYTR	CFB Trenton	Trenton, Ontario, Canada
YTS	CYTS	Timmins/Victor M. Power Airport	Timmins, Ontario, Canada
YTT		Tisdale Airport (TC: CJY3)	Tisdale, Saskatchewan, Canada
YTU		Tasu Water Aerodrome	Tasu, British Columbia, Canada
YTW	ZWYT	Yutian Wanfang Airport	Yutian, Xinjiang, China
YTX		Telegraph Creek Airport (TC: CBM5)	Telegraph Creek, British Columbia, Canada
YTY	ZSYA	Yangzhou Taizhou Airport	Yangzhou / Taizhou, Jiangsu, China
YTZ	CYTZ	Billy Bishop Toronto City Airport (Toronto Island Airport)	Toronto, Ontario, Canada
-YU-
YUA	ZPYM	Yuanmou Air Base	Yuanmou, Yunnan, China
YUB	CYUB	Tuktoyaktuk/James Gruben Airport	Tuktoyaktuk, Northwest Territories, Canada
YUD	CYMU	Umiujaq Airport	Umiujaq, Quebec, Canada
YUE	YYND	Yuendumu Airport	Yuendumu, Northern Territory, Australia
YUK	UDCK	Syunik Airport	Kapan, Syunik, Armenia
YUL	CYUL	Montréal–Trudeau International Airport	Montreal, Quebec, Canada
YUM	KNYL	Yuma International Airport / MCAS Yuma (FAA: NYL)	Yuma, Arizona, United States
YUS	ZLYS	Yushu Batang Airport	Yushu City, Qinghai, China
YUT	CYUT	Repulse Bay Airport	Naujaat (Repulse Bay), Nunavut, Canada
YUX	CYUX	Sanirajak Airport	Sanirajak Beach, Nunavut, Canada
YUY	CYUY	Rouyn-Noranda Airport	Rouyn-Noranda, Quebec, Canada
-YV-
YVA	FMCN	Iconi Airport	Moroni, Comoros
YVB	CYVB	Bonaventure Airport	Bonaventure, Quebec, Canada
YVC	CYVC	La Ronge (Barber Field) Airport	La Ronge, Saskatchewan, Canada
YVD		Yeva Airport	Yeva, Papua New Guinea
YVE	CYVK	Vernon Regional Airport	Vernon, British Columbia, Canada
YVG	CYVG	Vermilion Airport	Vermilion, Alberta, Canada
YVM	CYVM	Qikiqtarjuaq Airport	Qikiqtarjuaq, Nunavut, Canada
YVN	CYVN	Cape Dyer Airport	Cape Dyer, Nunavut, Canada
YVO	CYVO	Val-d'Or Airport	Val-d'Or, Quebec, Canada
YVP	CYVP	Kuujjuaq Airport	Kuujjuaq, Quebec, Canada
YVQ	CYVQ	Norman Wells Airport	Norman Wells, Northwest Territories, Canada
YVR	CYVR	Vancouver International Airport	Vancouver, British Columbia, Canada
YVT	CYVT	Buffalo Narrows Airport	Buffalo Narrows, Saskatchewan, Canada
YVV	CYVV	Wiarton Airport	Wiarton, Ontario, Canada
YVZ	CYVZ	Deer Lake Airport	Deer Lake, Ontario, Canada
-YW-
YWA	CYWA	Petawawa Airport	Petawawa, Ontario, Canada
YWB	CYKG	Kangiqsujuaq (Wakeham Bay) Airport	Kangiqsujuaq, Quebec, Canada
YWG	CYWG	Winnipeg James Armstrong Richardson International Airport	Winnipeg, Manitoba, Canada
YWH	CYWH	Victoria Harbour Water Airport	Victoria, British Columbia, Canada
YWJ	CYWJ	Déline Airport	Deline, Northwest Territories, Canada
YWK	CYWK	Wabush Airport	Wabush, Newfoundland and Labrador, Canada
YWL	CYWL	Williams Lake Airport	Williams Lake, British Columbia, Canada
YWM		Williams Harbour Airport (TC: CCA6)	William's Harbour, Newfoundland and Labrador, Canada
YWP	CYWP	Webequie Airport	Webequie, Ontario, Canada
YWQ		Chutes-des-Passes/Lac Margane Water Aerodrome (TC: CTM3)	Passes-Dangereuses (Chute-des-Passes), Quebec, Canada
YWR		White River Water Aerodrome (TC: CNJ8)	White River, Ontario, Canada
YWS		Whistler/Green Lake Water Aerodrome (TC: CAE5)	Whistler, British Columbia, Canada
YWY	CYWY	Wrigley Airport	Wrigley, Northwest Territories, Canada
-YX-
YXC	CYXC	Cranbrook/Canadian Rockies International Airport	Cranbrook, British Columbia, Canada
YXD	CYXD	Edmonton City Centre (Blatchford Field) Airport	Edmonton, Alberta, Canada
YXE	CYXE	Saskatoon John G. Diefenbaker International Airport	Saskatoon, Saskatchewan, Canada
YXH	CYXH	Medicine Hat Airport	Medicine Hat, Alberta, Canada
YXJ	CYXJ	Fort St. John Airport (North Peace Airport)	Fort St. John, British Columbia, Canada
YXK	CYXK	Rimouski Airport	Rimouski, Quebec, Canada
YXL	CYXL	Sioux Lookout Airport	Sioux Lookout, Ontario, Canada
YXN	CYXN	Whale Cove Airport	Whale Cove, Nunavut, Canada
YXP	CYXP	Pangnirtung Airport	Pangnirtung, Nunavut, Canada
YXQ	CYXQ	Beaver Creek Airport	Beaver Creek, Yukon, Canada
YXR	CYXR	Earlton (Timiskaming Regional) Airport	Armstrong (Earlton), Ontario, Canada
YXS	CYXS	Prince George Airport	Prince George, British Columbia, Canada
YXT	CYXT	Northwest Regional Airport	Terrace, British Columbia, Canada
YXU	CYXU	London International Airport	London, Ontario, Canada
YXX	CYXX	Abbotsford International Airport	Abbotsford, British Columbia, Canada
YXY	CYXY	Erik Nielsen Whitehorse International Airport	Whitehorse, Yukon, Canada
YXZ	CYXZ	Wawa Airport	Wawa, Ontario, Canada
-YY-
YYA	ZGYY	Yueyang Sanhe Airport	Yueyang, Hunan, China
YYB	CYYB	North Bay/Jack Garland Airport	North Bay, Ontario, Canada
YYC	CYYC	Calgary International Airport	Calgary, Alberta, Canada
YYD	CYYD	Smithers Airport	Smithers, British Columbia, Canada
YYE	CYYE	Northern Rockies Regional Airport	Fort Nelson, British Columbia, Canada
YYF	CYYF	Penticton Regional Airport	Penticton, British Columbia, Canada
YYG	CYYG	Charlottetown Airport	Charlottetown, Prince Edward Island, Canada
YYH	CYYH	Taloyoak Airport	Taloyoak, Nunavut, Canada
YYI	CYYI	Rivers Airport	Rivers, Manitoba, Canada
YYJ	CYYJ	Victoria International Airport	Victoria, British Columbia, Canada
YYL	CYYL	Lynn Lake Airport	Lynn Lake, Manitoba, Canada
YYM	CYYM	Cowley Airport	Cowley, Alberta, Canada
YYN	CYYN	Swift Current Airport	Swift Current, Saskatchewan, Canada
YYQ	CYYQ	Churchill Airport	Churchill, Manitoba, Canada
YYR	CYYR	CFB Goose Bay	Happy Valley-Goose Bay, Newfoundland and Labrador, Canada
YYT	CYYT	St. John's International Airport	St. John's, Newfoundland and Labrador, Canada
YYU	CYYU	Kapuskasing Airport	Kapuskasing, Ontario, Canada
YYW	CYYW	Armstrong Airport	Armstrong, Ontario, Canada
YYY	CYYY	Mont-Joli Airport	Mont-Joli, Quebec, Canada
YYZ	CYYZ	Toronto Pearson International Airport	Toronto, Ontario, Canada
-YZ-
YZA	CYZA	Cache Creek Airport (Ashcroft Regional Airport)	Cache Creek / Ashcroft, British Columbia, Canada
YZE	CYZE	Gore Bay-Manitoulin Airport	Gore Bay, Ontario, Canada
YZF	CYZF	Yellowknife Airport	Yellowknife, Northwest Territories, Canada
YZG	CYZG	Salluit Airport	Salluit, Quebec, Canada
YZH	CYZH	Slave Lake Airport	Slave Lake, Alberta, Canada
YZP	CYZP	Sandspit Airport	Sandspit, British Columbia, Canada
YZR	CYZR	Sarnia Chris Hadfield Airport	Sarnia, Ontario, Canada
YZS	CYZS	Coral Harbour Airport	Coral Harbour, Nunavut, Canada
YZT	CYZT	Port Hardy Airport	Port Hardy, British Columbia, Canada
YZU	CYZU	Whitecourt Airport	Whitecourt, Alberta, Canada
YZV	CYZV	Sept-Îles Airport	Sept-Îles, Quebec, Canada
YZW	CYZW	Teslin Airport	Teslin, Yukon, Canada
YZX	CYZX	CFB Greenwood	Greenwood, Nova Scotia, Canada
YZY	ZLZY	Zhangye Ganzhou Airport	Zhangye, Gansu, China
YZZ		Trail Airport (TC: CAD4)	Trail, British Columbia, Canada

== Notes ==
- ^1 YEA is common IATA code for Edmonton International Airport (IATA: YEG) and former Edmonton City Centre Airport (IATA: YXD).
- ^2 Lloydminster city is incorporated by both provinces as a single city with a single municipal administration. Lloydminster Airport is located northwest of the city, in Alberta province.
- ^3 YMQ is common IATA code for Montréal–Pierre Elliott Trudeau International Airport (IATA: YUL), Montréal–Mirabel International Airport (IATA: YMX) and Montreal Saint-Hubert Longueuil Airport (IATA: YHU).
- ^4 YTO is common IATA code for Toronto Pearson International Airport (IATA: YYZ), John C. Munro Hamilton International Airport (IATA: YHM), Region of Waterloo International Airport (IATA: YKF), Billy Bishop Toronto City Airport (IATA: YTZ) and Buttonville Municipal Airport (IATA: YKZ).
