= Air Inuit =

Inuit owned Canadian airline

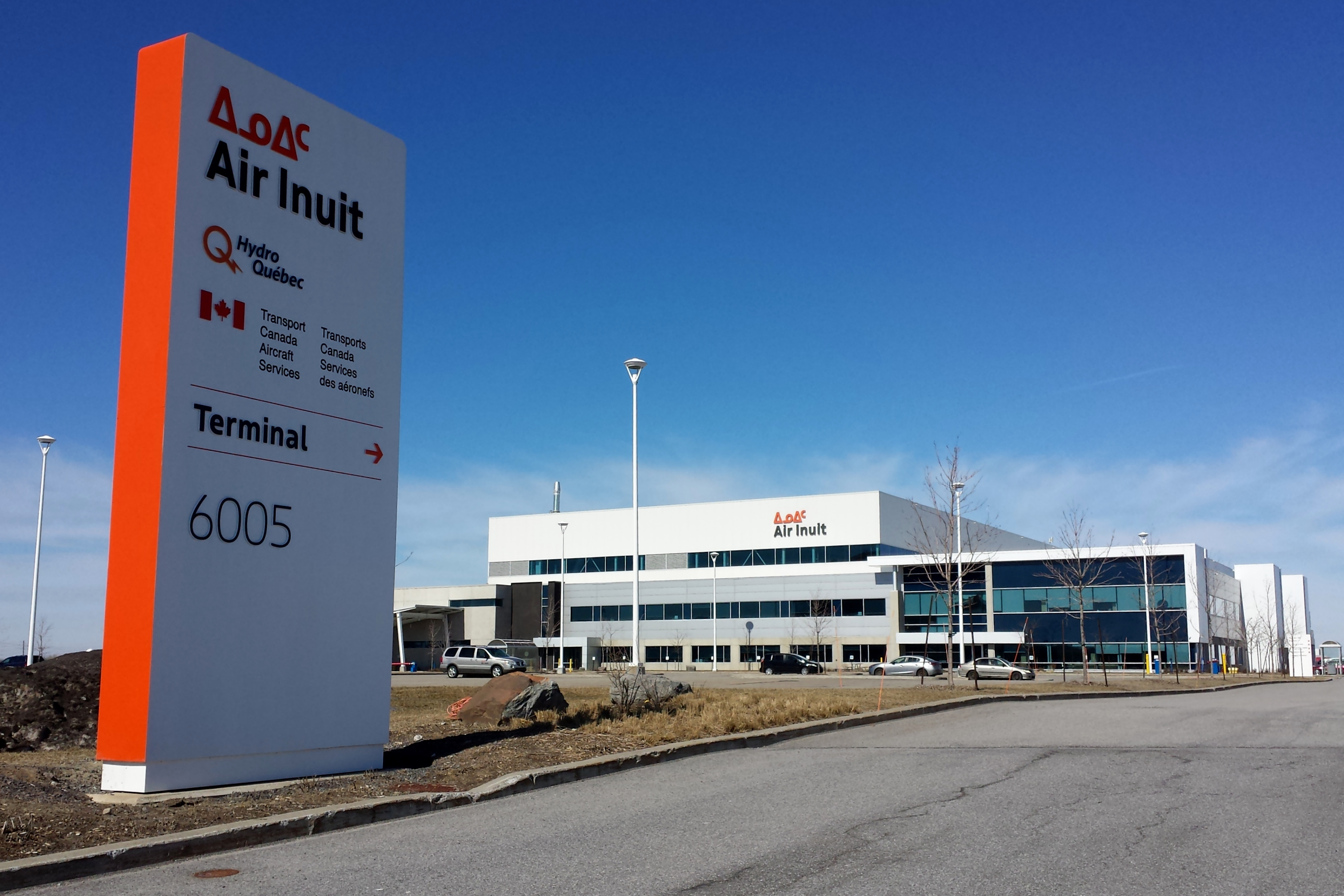
- Air Inuit headquarters at the Montreal-Trudeau Airport
IATA	ICAO	Call sign
3H	AIE	INUIT
- Founded: November 1978; 47 years ago
- AOC #: Canada 2955, United States ILLF043F
- Operating bases: Montréal–Trudeau International Airport; Kuujjuaq Airport; Puvirnituq Airport
- Frequent-flyer program: Isaruuk Reward Program
- Fleet size: 37
- Destinations: 21
- Parent company: Makivik Corporation
- Headquarters: Saint-Laurent, Quebec
- Key people: Christian Busch (President, Air Inuit)
- Website: www.airinuit.com

Air Inuit (Inuktitut syllabics: ᐃᓄᐃᑦ ᖃᖓᑦᑕᔪᖏᑦ) is an airline headquartered in the Montreal borough of Saint-Laurent, Quebec, Canada. It operates domestic passenger services and charter and cargo services in Nunavik, southern Quebec, and Nunavut. Its main base is Kuujjuaq Airport.

== History ==
The airline was established and started operations in 1978 using a de Havilland Canada DHC-2 Beaver aircraft. The airline is collectively owned by the Inuit of Nunavik through Makivvik.

In 1984 it acquired Chaparal Charters and its fleet of two Twin Otters and one Douglas DC-3.

In 2012, Air Inuit relocated their headquarters to a new multi-purpose facility on Côte-Vertu Boulevard near the Montréal–Trudeau International Airport.

In 2016, Air Inuit pilot Melissa Haney became the first female Inuk pilot to reach the rank of captain. She was featured on a commemorative postage stamp released by the Canadian Ninety-Nines.

In 2023, Air Inuit announced the retirement of its Boeing 737-200 Combi aircraft. The airline will replace the Boeing 737-200 with three Boeing 737-800 Combi aircraft.

== Destinations ==
Air Inuit operates scheduled services to the following domestic destinations (July 2023):

=== Scheduled flights ===
Province	Community/City	IATA	ICAO	Airport	Notes
Nunavut	Sanikiluaq	YSK	CYSK	Sanikiluaq Airport	
Quebec	Akulivik	AKV	CYKO	Akulivik Airport	
Quebec	Aupaluk	YPJ	CYLA	Aupaluk Airport	
Quebec	Inukjuak	YPH	CYPH	Inukjuak Airport	
Quebec	Ivujivik	YIK	CYIK	Ivujivik Airport	
Quebec	Kangiqsualujjuaq	XGR	CYLU	Kangiqsualujjuaq (Georges River) Airport	
Quebec	Kangiqsujuaq	YWB	CYKG	Kangiqsujuaq (Wakeham Bay) Airport	
Quebec	Kangirsuk	YKG	CYAS	Kangirsuk Airport	
Quebec	Kuujjuaq	YVP	CYVP	Kuujjuaq Airport	Hub
Quebec	Kuujjuarapik	YGW	CYGW	Kuujjuarapik Airport	
Quebec	Montreal	YUL	CYUL	Montréal–Trudeau International Airport	Hub
Quebec	Puvirnituq	YPX	CYPX	Puvirnituq Airport	Hub
Quebec	Quaqtaq	YQC	CYHA	Quaqtaq Airport	
Quebec	Quebec City	YQB	CYQB	Québec City Jean Lesage International Airport	
Quebec	Radisson (La Grande)	YGL	CYGL	La Grande Rivière Airport	
Quebec	Salluit	YZG	CYZG	Salluit Airport	
Quebec	Schefferville	YKL	CYKL	Schefferville Airport	
Quebec	Sept-Îles	YZV	CYZV	Sept-Îles Airport	
Quebec	Tasiujaq	YTQ	CYTQ	Tasiujaq Airport	
Quebec	Umiujaq	YUD	CYMU	Umiujaq Airport	

=== Charters ===
Air Inuit also offers other charter services to anywhere in North America.

== Fleet ==
=== Current ===
As of June 2025, the Air Inuit fleet includes the following aircraft:

Air Inuit fleet
Aircraft	Number	Orders	Variants	Notes
Beechcraft Super King Air	3	-	300 Series	Listed as 350 at Air Inuit, 11 passengers
Boeing 737	5	-	200 Series	Combi aircraft, able to operate from gravel airstrips, 112 passengers. To be retired and replaced by the 800 Series of the Boeing 737 Next Generation.
Boeing 737 Classic	2	-	300 Series	Up to 130 passengers
Boeing 737 Next Generation	3	–	800 Series	
de Havilland Canada DHC-6 Twin Otter	7	-	300 Series	3,200 lb (1,500 kg) cargo, 19 passengers
De Havilland Canada Dash 8	17	-	100 Series, 300 Series	Three 100 Series combi aircraft, 37 seat maximum, 7,800 lb (3,500 kg) cargo; twelve 300 Series combi and cargo aircraft, 45 seat maximum, 13,500 lb (6,100 kg)
Total	37	0		

Air Inuit also has access to a Eurocopter Écureuil (Aerospatiale ASTAR 350) through Nunavik Rotors and a de Havilland Canada DHC-3 Otter through Johnny May's Air Charters.

On 1 March 2016, Bombardier Inc. announced that Air Inuit would be the launch customer for the Bombardier Q300 Large Cargo Door freighter.

== Aircraft types ==
Air Inuit aircraft
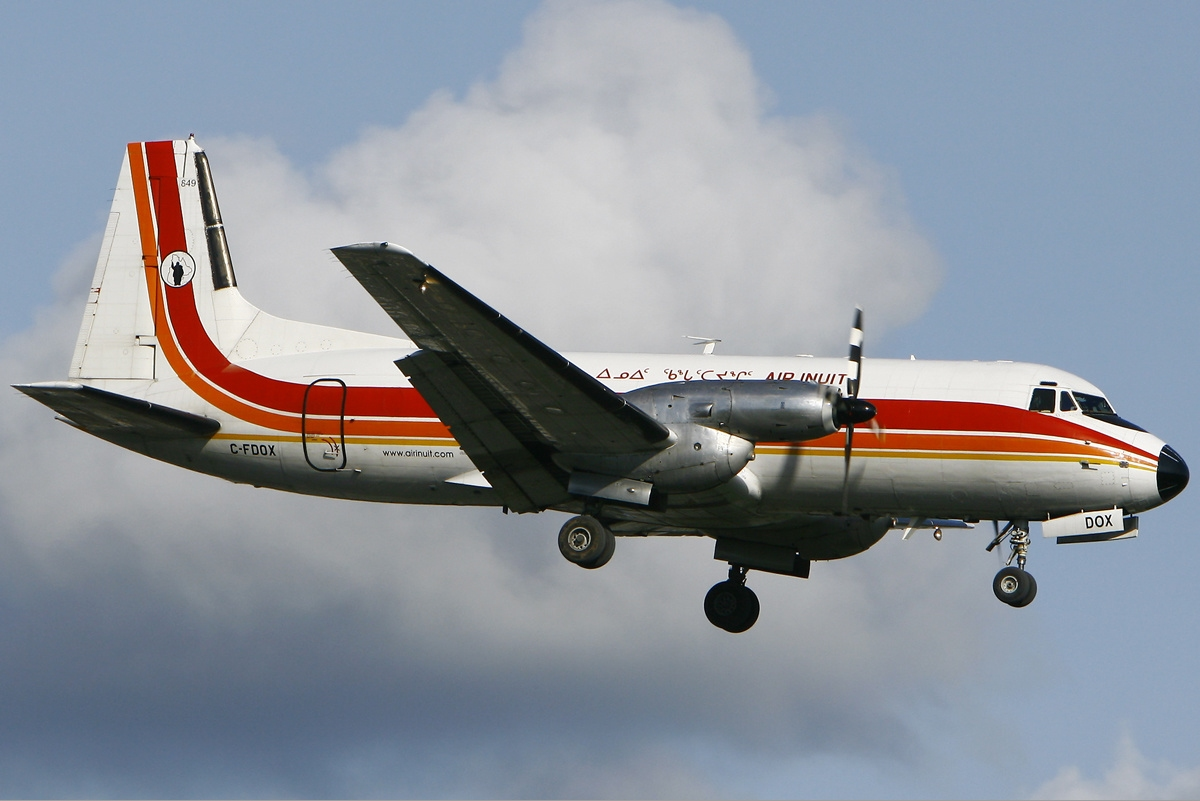
Hawker Siddeley HS 748

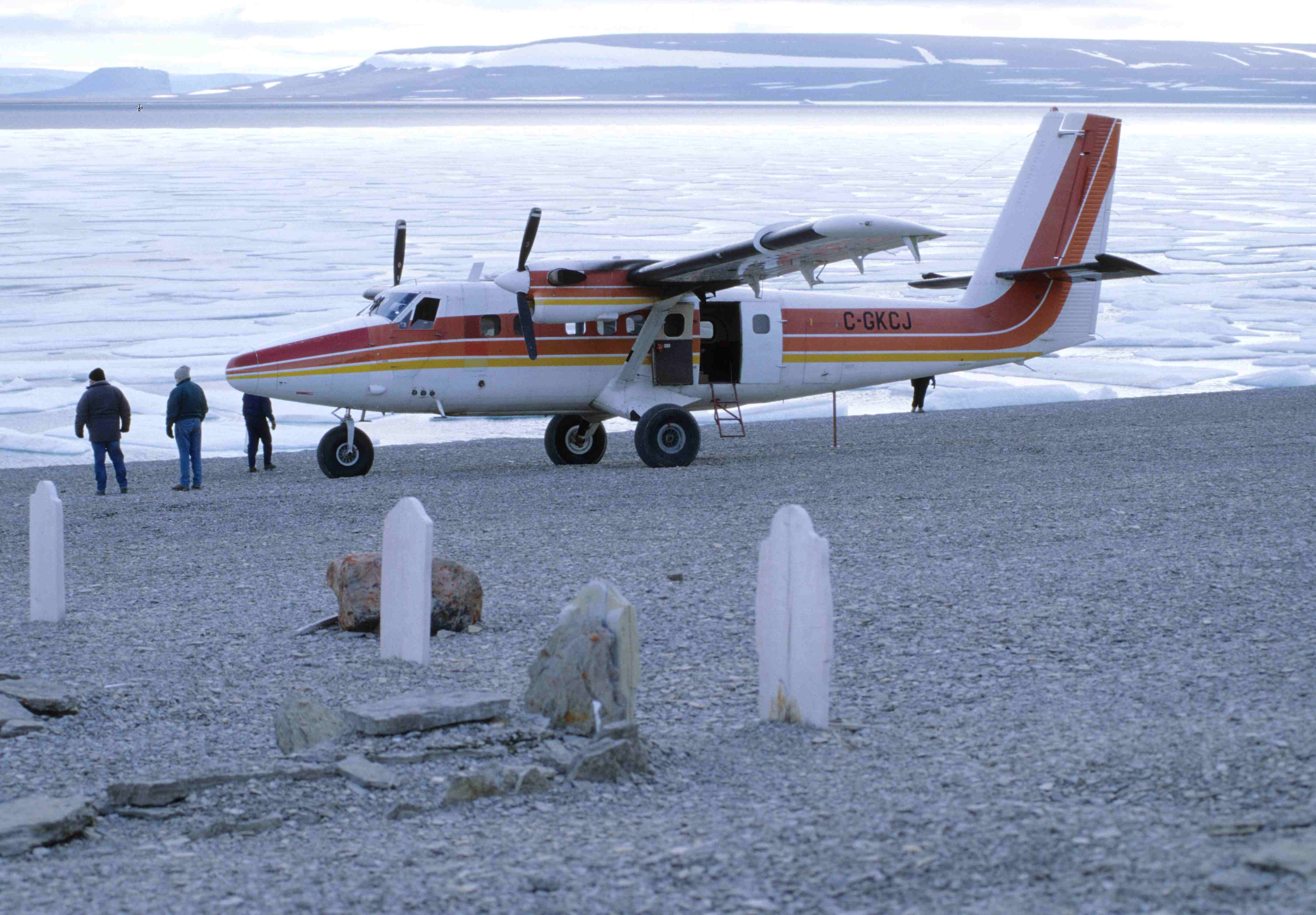
A Twin Otter at Beechey Island visiting the graves of sailors from the lost expedition of John Franklin

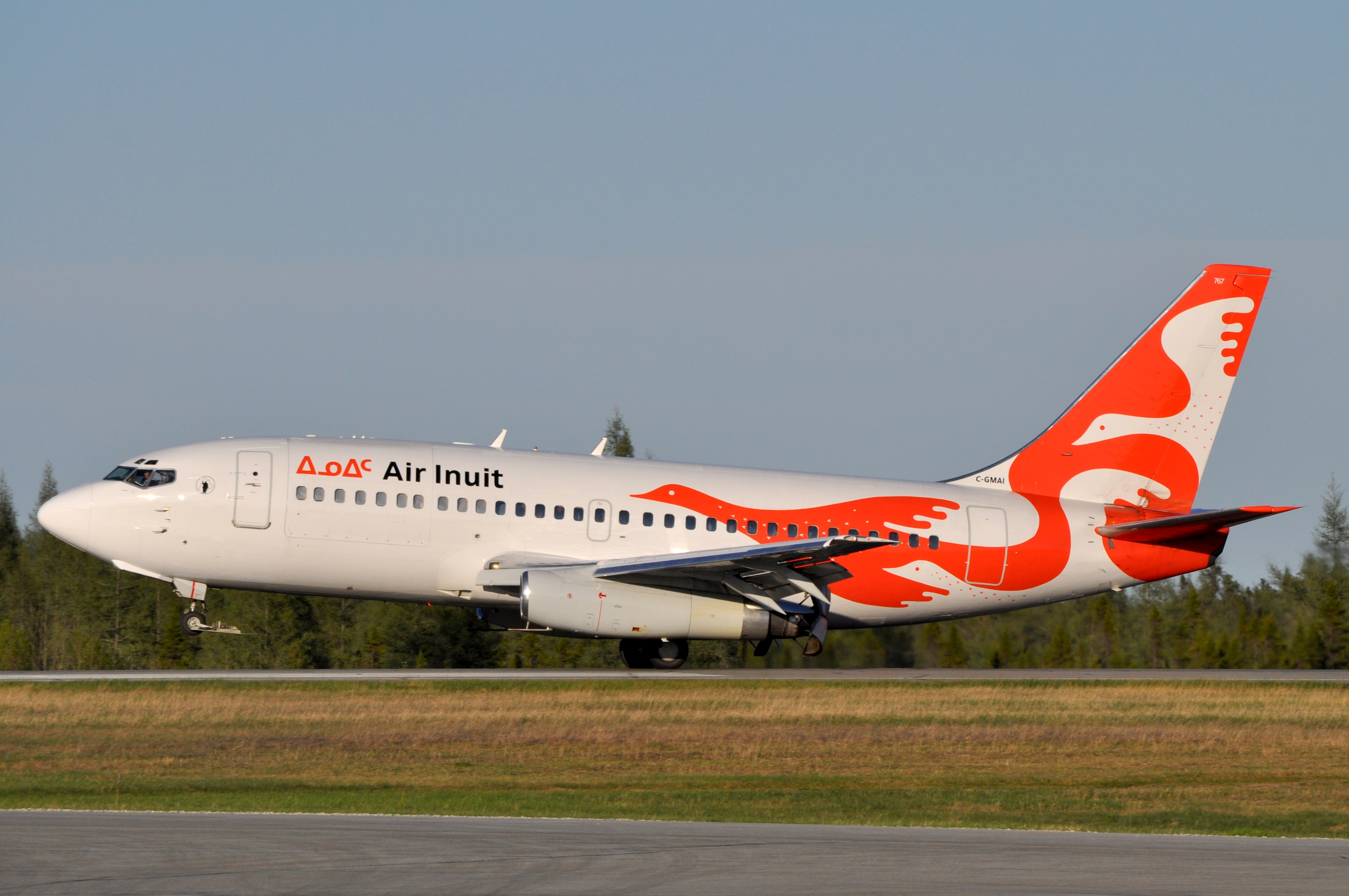
One of Air Inuit's five Boeing 737-200s, at Val-d'Or Airport.

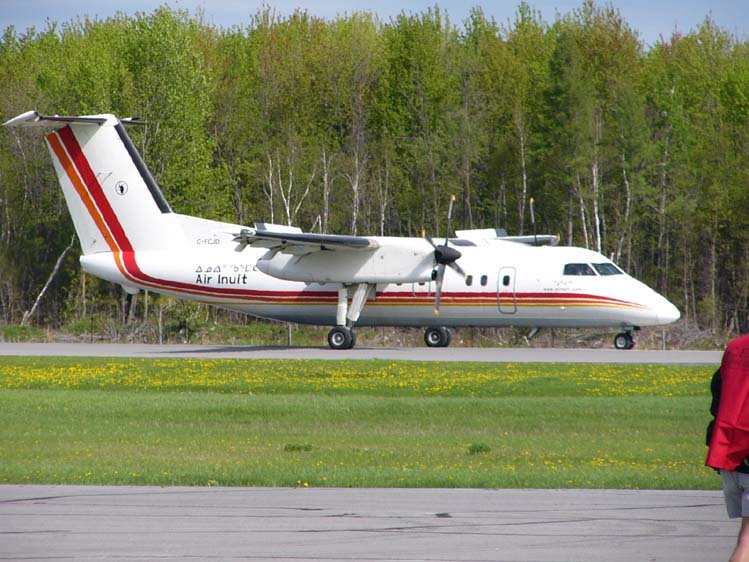
A De Havilland Canada Dash 8-102 belonging to Air Inuit at Cornwall, Ontario, May 2005

=== Former ===
Previously Air Inuit have also flown the following aircraft:

- Beechcraft King Air
- Cessna 185 Skywagon
- Cessna 421
- Convair Liner 340 (580)
- Convair 440 (580)
- Grumman Gulfstream I (G-159)
- Hawker Siddeley HS 748

== Accidents and incidents ==
- On 16 March 1981, Douglas C-47 Skytrain, C-FIRW, was damaged beyond repair when it broke through the frozen surface of Lake Bienville while taxiing for take-off on a cargo flight.
