= YAQ =

YAQ or yaq can refer to:

- Yaqui language, an indigenous language spoken in Sonora state, Mexico and Arizona, U.S., by ISO 639 code
- Maple Bay Seaplane Base, an airport in Maple Bay, British Columbia, Canada, by IATA code; see List of airports by IATA airport code: Y
- Yu'an District, a district of Lu'an, Anhui, China; see List of administrative divisions of Anhui
