= YVP =

YVP or yvp may refer to:

- Kuujjuaq Airport in Quebec, Canada, IATA airport code YVP
- Yeovil Pen Mill railway station in Somerset, England, National Rail code YVP
