= Akulivik Airport =

Airport in Akulivik, Quebec, Canada

- IATA: AKV; ICAO: CYKO

Summary
- Airport type: Public
- Operator: Administration régionale Kativik
- Location: Akulivik, Quebec
- Time zone: EST (UTC−05:00)
  - Summer (DST): EDT (UTC−04:00)
- Elevation AMSL: 76 ft / 23 m
- Coordinates: 60°49′07″N 078°08′55″W

Map
- Location in Quebec CYKO (Canada)

Runways
Direction	Length		Surface
Direction	ft	m	Surface
08/26	3,521	1,073	Gravel

Statistics (2014)
- Aircraft movements: 1,103
- Source: Canada Flight Supplement; Movements from Statistics Canada

Akulivik Airport (IATA: AKV, ICAO: CYKO) is located 1.5 nautical miles (2.8 km; 1.7 mi) southwest of Akulivik, Quebec, Canada.

Akulivik is located on the western or Hudson Bay side of the Ungava Peninsula.

The airport features a 3,521 by 100 ft (1,073 by 30 m) runway made of gravel. It is operated by the Kativik Regional Government.

== Airlines and destinations ==
Airlines	Destinations
Air Inuit	Inukjuak, Ivujivik, Kuujjuarapik, Montreal–Trudeau, Puvirnituq, Salluit, Umiujaq
