= Akulivik =

Akulivik ᐊᑯᓕᕕᒃ
- Northern village municipality
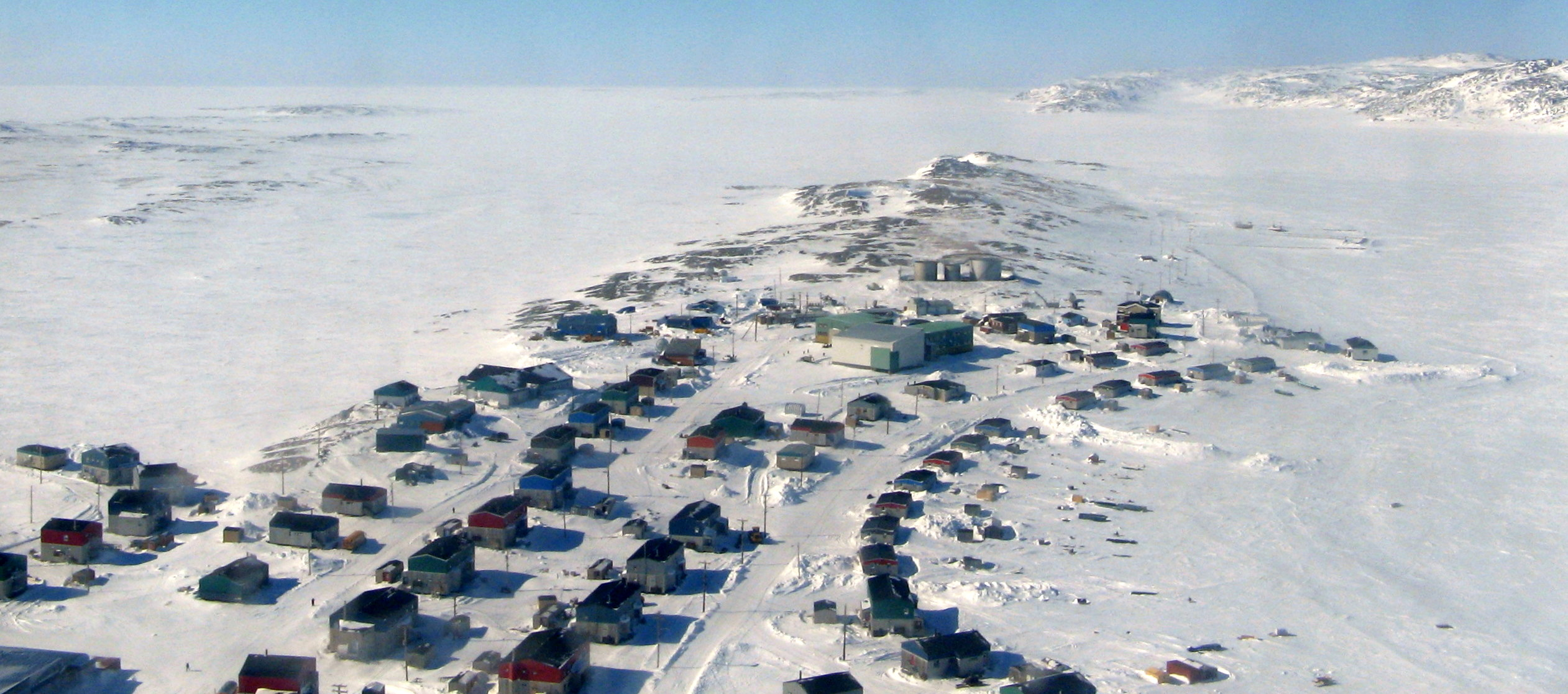

- Location within Quebec
- Coordinates: 60°48′N 78°12′W
- Country: Canada
- Province: Quebec
- Region: Nord-du-Québec
- TE: Kativik
- Constituted: December 29, 1979

Government
  - Mayor: Adamie Alayco
  - Federal riding: Abitibi—Baie-James—Nunavik—Eeyou
  - Prov. riding: Ungava

Area
  - Total: 82.60 km^{2} (31.89 sq mi)
  - Land: 75.02 km^{2} (28.97 sq mi)

Population (2021)
  - Total: 642
  - Density: 8.6/km^{2} (22/sq mi)
  - Change (2016–21): ▲1.4%
  - Dwellings: 204
- Time zone: UTC−5 (EST)
  - Summer (DST): UTC−4 (EDT)
- Postal code(s): J0M 1V0
- Area code: 819
- Website: www.nvakulivik.ca

Akulivik (Inuktitut: ᐊᑯᓕᕕᒃ) (2021 population 642) is an Inuit village in Nunavik, in northern Quebec, Canada. It is located on a peninsula that juts southwesterly into Hudson Bay across from Smith Island, Nunavut (Qikirtajuaq). Akulivik lies 1,850 km north of Montreal.

Akulivik, meaning "central prong of a kakivak" in the Nunavik dialect of Inuktitut, takes its name from the surrounding geography. Located on a peninsula between two bays, the area evokes the shape of a kakivak, a traditional, trident-shaped spear used for fishing.

Telephone and internet services are delivered by satellite. There is no hospital, but a clinic staffed by nurses provides non-critical care; otherwise air ambulances are available. Policing is done by the Kativik Regional Police Force.

== History ==
Akulivik was incorporated as a community in 1976. The Inuit have lived in the area for thousands of years. In 1610, the explorer Henry Hudson passed by the island of Qikirtajuaq near present-day Akulivik.

In 1922, the Hudson's Bay Company established a trading post on the site of today's settlement. The outpost was moved to the island of Qikirtajuaq in 1926. Between 1922 and 1955, the area where Akulivik is located today was the summer camp of Inuit who congregated around the trading post. In 1952, the post was closed, forcing the families to move to Puvirnituq, 100 km to the south.

In 1973, one family moved back to the area. The following year, many others followed and, together, they built the village of Akulivik.

On June 11, 2017, a resident named Illutak Anautak broke into three homes and stabbed five people, killing three and critically injuring two, among them a 10-year-old child. Anautak was shot and killed by police when attempting to break into a fourth home. His motives were unclear.

== Demographics ==
In the 2021 Census of Population conducted by Statistics Canada, Akulivik had a population of 642 living in 181 of its 204 total private dwellings, a change of 1.4% from its 2016 population of 633. With a land area of 75.02 km^{2} (28.97 sq mi), it had a population density of 8.6/km^{2} (22.2/sq mi) in 2021.

== Education ==
The Kativik School Board operates the Tukisiniarvik School.

The Tukisiniarvik School has 167 students in classes from Kindergarten to Secondary V (Grade 11). Inuktitut remains the dominant language of the community. As in all the communities of Nunavik, Inuktitut is also the language of instruction at school until grade 3, at which point students choose between English or French as the language of instruction, and continue to study Inuktitut language and Inuit culture as separate subjects.

== Transportation ==
Inaccessible by road, Akulivik is served by the small Akulivik Airport – AKV.

Ice starts to form in late September and stays until late July, when the Bay becomes navigable. Large items are delivered by ship, including in building supplies, snowmobiles and gasoline, as well as a year's supply of diesel fuel for the town generator. Thrice-weekly air service brings cargo including food and services to Akulivik.

== Government ==
List of mayors

From	To	Name	Party	Position
1980	1981	Peter Matte		
1981	1983	Tania Quinujuak		
1983	1985	Peter Anautak		
2012	4 November 2015	Adamie Alayco		
2015	27 November 2018	Mark Qumak		
2018	3 November 2021	Eli Aullaluk		
