= Kangiqsualujjuaq (Georges River) Airport =

Airport in Kangiqsualujjuaq, Quebec, Canada

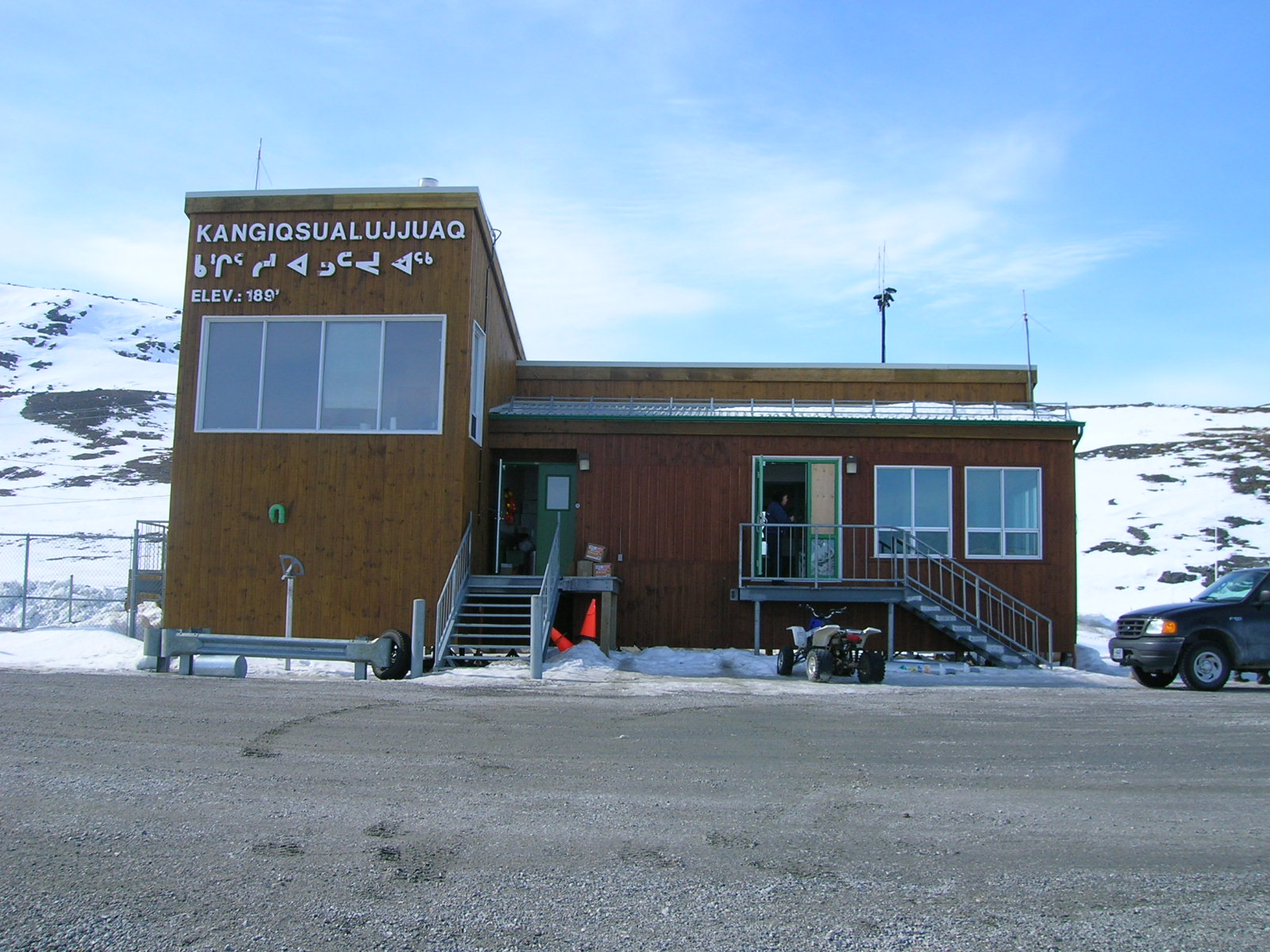
- IATA: XGR; ICAO: CYLU

Summary
- Airport type: Public
- Operator: Administration Régionale Kativik
- Location: Kangiqsualujjuaq, Quebec
- Time zone: EST (UTC−05:00)
  - Summer (DST): EDT (UTC−04:00)
- Elevation AMSL: 217 ft / 66 m
- Coordinates: 58°42′41″N 065°59′34″W

Map
- Location in Quebec CYLU (Canada)

Runways
Direction	Length		Surface
Direction	ft	m	Surface
16/34	3,521	1,073	Gravel

Statistics (2010)
- Aircraft movements: 1,589
- Source: Canada Flight Supplement; Movements from Statistics Canada

Kangiqsualujjuaq (Georges River) Airport (IATA: XGR, ICAO: CYLU) is an airport located 1.2 nautical miles (2.2 km; 1.4 mi) northwest of Kangiqsualujjuaq, Quebec, Canada.

== Airlines and destinations ==
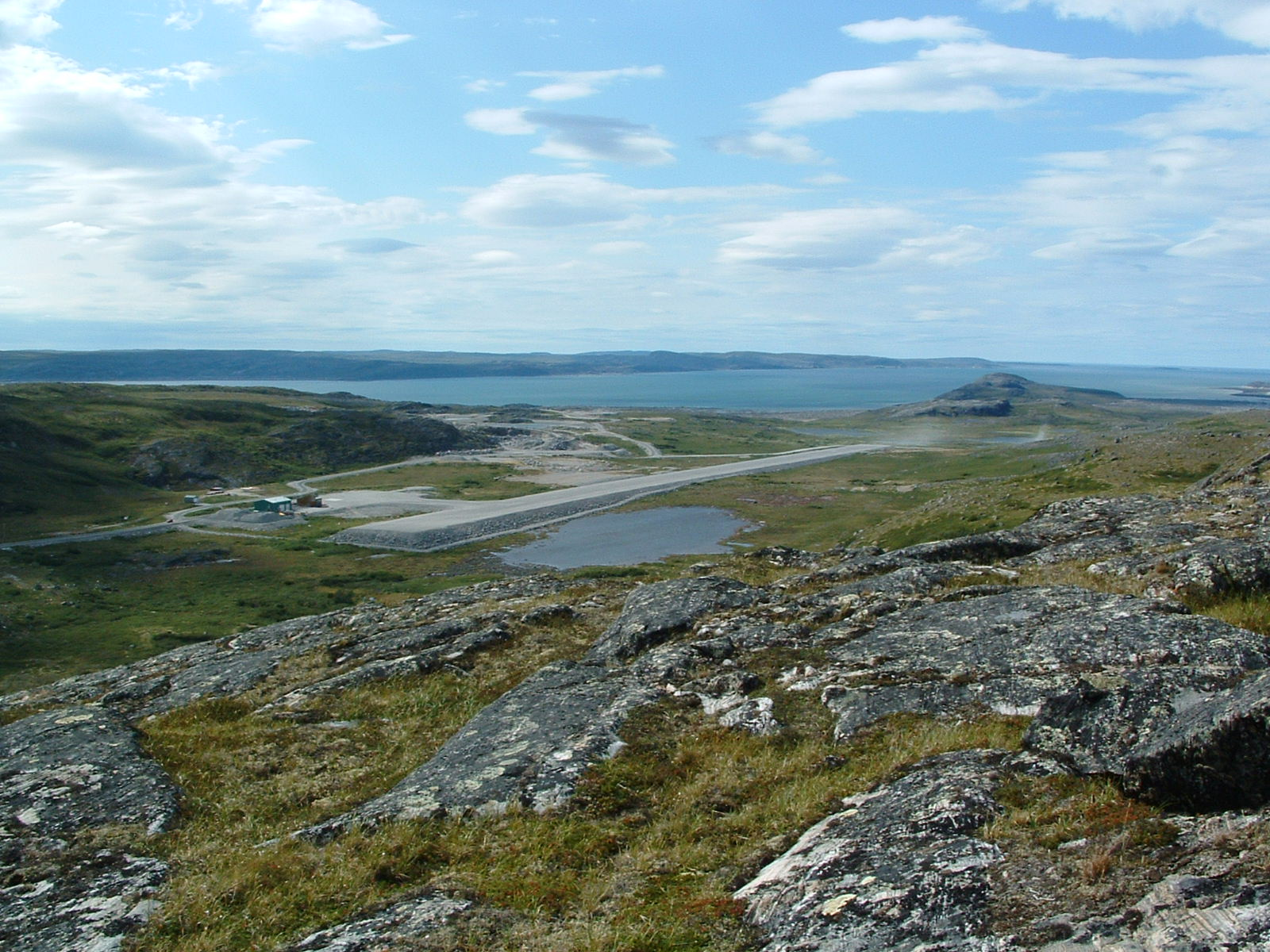
The runway at Kangiqsualujjuaq Airport

Information about airlines serving the airport can be found on flight resources.

Airlines	Destinations
Air Inuit	Kuujjuaq
