= Salluit Airport =

Airport in Salluit, Quebec, Canada

- IATA: YZG; ICAO: CYZG; WMO: 71641

Summary
- Airport type: Public
- Operator: Administration Régionale Kativik
- Location: Salluit, Quebec
- Time zone: EST (UTC−05:00)
  - Summer (DST): EDT (UTC−04:00)
- Elevation AMSL: 745 ft / 227 m
- Coordinates: 62°10′46″N 075°40′02″W

Map
- Location in Quebec

Runways
| Direction | Length | | Surface |
| Direction | ft | m | Surface |
|---|---|---|---|
| 03/21 | 3,523 | 1,074 | Gravel |

Statistics (2010)
- Aircraft movements: 2,404
- Source: Canada Flight Supplement; Movements from Statistics Canada

Salluit Airport (IATA: YZG, ICAO: CYZG) is located 1.5 nautical miles (2.8 km; 1.7 mi) southwest of the community of Salluit, Quebec, Canada. There are no roads into Salluit, so the airport provides the only means for the residents to access southern Quebec.

Scheduled service is provided by Air Inuit using Twin Otter and Dash 8 aircraft several times per week.

== Airlines and destinations ==
| Airlines | Destinations |
|---|---|
| Air Inuit | Akulivik, Inukjuak, Ivujivik, Kangiqsujuaq, Kangirsuk, Kuujjuaq, Kuujjuarapik, Montreal–Trudeau, Puvirnituq, Quaqtaq, Umiujaq |
