= Kangiqsujuaq (Wakeham Bay) Airport =

Airport in Kangiqsujuaq, Quebec, Canada

- IATA: YWB; ICAO: CYKG

Summary
- Airport type: Public
- Operator: Administration régionale Kativik
- Location: Kangiqsujuaq, Quebec
- Time zone: EST (UTC−05:00)
  - Summer (DST): EDT (UTC−04:00)
- Elevation AMSL: 517 ft / 158 m
- Coordinates: 61°35′19″N 071°55′46″W

Map
- Location in Quebec

Runways
Direction	Length		Surface
Direction	ft	m	Surface
14/32	3,520	1,073	Gravel

Statistics (2010)
- Aircraft movements: 2,317
- Source: Canada Flight Supplement; Movements from Statistics Canada

Kangiqsujuaq (Wakeham Bay) Airport (IATA: YWB, ICAO: CYKG) is located 0.7 nautical miles (1.3 km; 0.81 mi) southeast of Kangiqsujuaq, Quebec, Canada.

== Airlines and destinations ==
Airlines	Destinations
Air Inuit	Kangirsuk, Kuujjuaq, Quaqtaq, Salluit
