= La Grande Rivière Airport =

Airport in Quebec, Canada

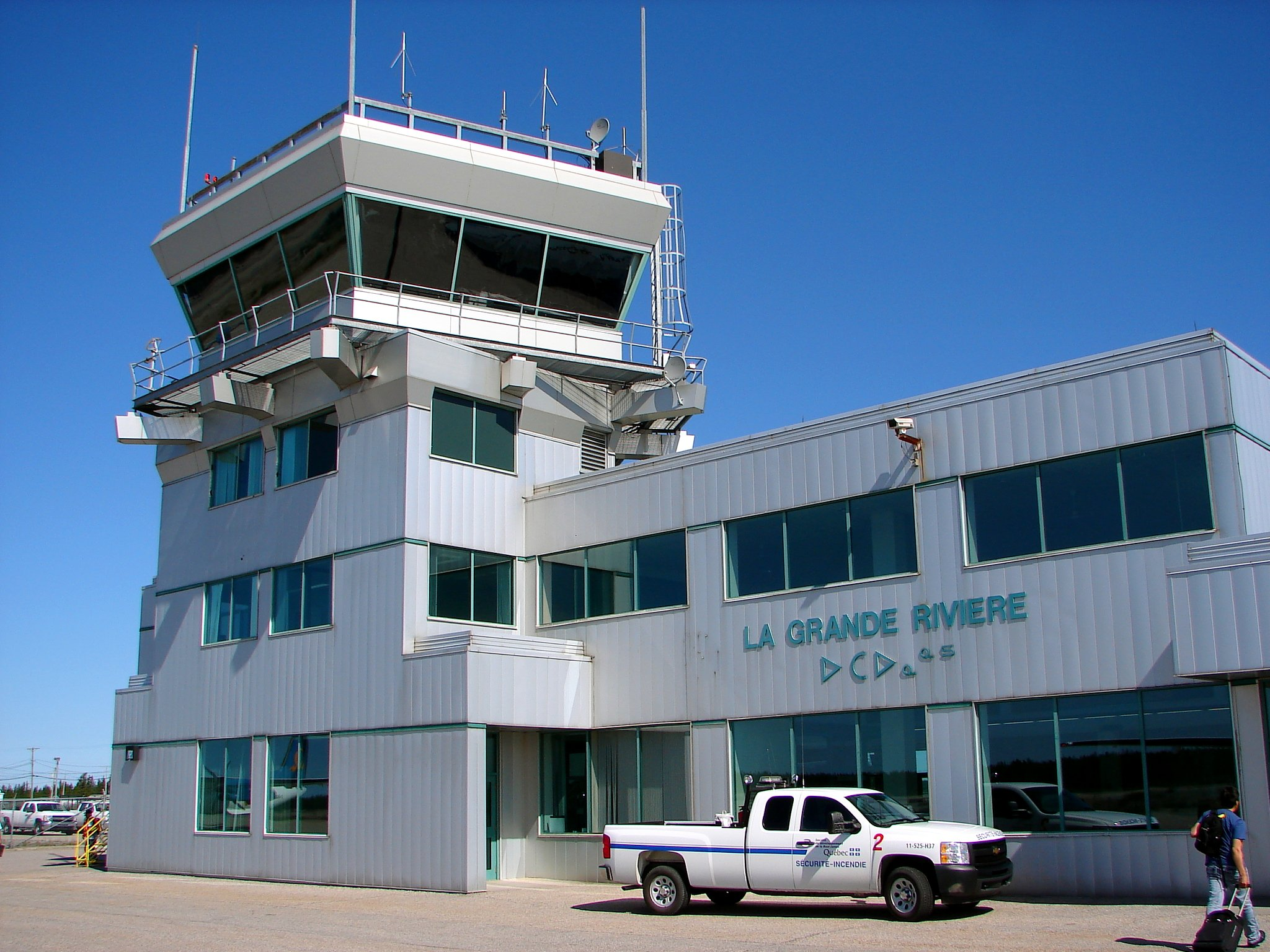
- IATA: YGL; ICAO: CYGL; WMO: 71827

Summary
- Airport type: Public
- Operator: Société de développement de la Baie James
- Serves: Radisson, Quebec
- Time zone: EST (UTC−05:00)
  - Summer (DST): EDT (UTC−04:00)
- Elevation AMSL: 640 ft / 195 m
- Coordinates: 53°37′31″N 077°42′15″W

Map
- Location in Quebec

Runways
Direction	Length		Surface
Direction	ft	m	Surface
13/31	6,487	1,977	Asphalt

Statistics (2010)
- Aircraft movements: 9,343
- Sources: Canada Flight Supplement; Environment Canada; Movements from Statistics Canada

La Grande Rivière Airport (IATA: YGL, ICAO: CYGL) is an airfield location about 30 km (19 mi) south southwest of Radisson, Quebec, Canada. It is used mostly to shuttle Hydro-Québec personnel between Radisson and the larger cities in Quebec, but it is also served by regular scheduled flights of Air Inuit. Passengers from Nunavik region flying south to Montreal go through security at this airport instead of their origin airport.

The 4-storey airport terminal was built in 1973 and 1974, and was expanded in 1991 with a new terminal building and several service buildings. Its passenger traffic had a peak of 93,400 in 1977, falling to around 15,000 in 1981.

During the mid- and late 1970s, Nordair operated scheduled passenger flights nonstop to Montreal Dorval Airport (now Trudeau International Airport) with Boeing 737-200 jetliners on a weekly basis. Air Creebec also served the airport until March 2012.

== Airlines and destinations ==
Airlines	Destinations
Air Inuit	Kuujjuarapik, Montréal–Trudeau, Puvirnituq

== Accidents and incidents ==
- On 15 November 1975, Douglas C-47 C-FCSC of Nordair was damaged beyond economic repair by fire at La Grande Rivière Airport.
- On 1 August 1994, RAF Tornado GR1 ZD844 made an emergency landing at La Grande Rivière Airport. The aircraft had just had a midair collision with another RAF Tornado, ZA397, which then crashed into a nearby reservoir after the crew ejected.

== See also ==
- La Grande-3 Airport
- La Grande-4 Airport
