= Tasiujaq Airport =

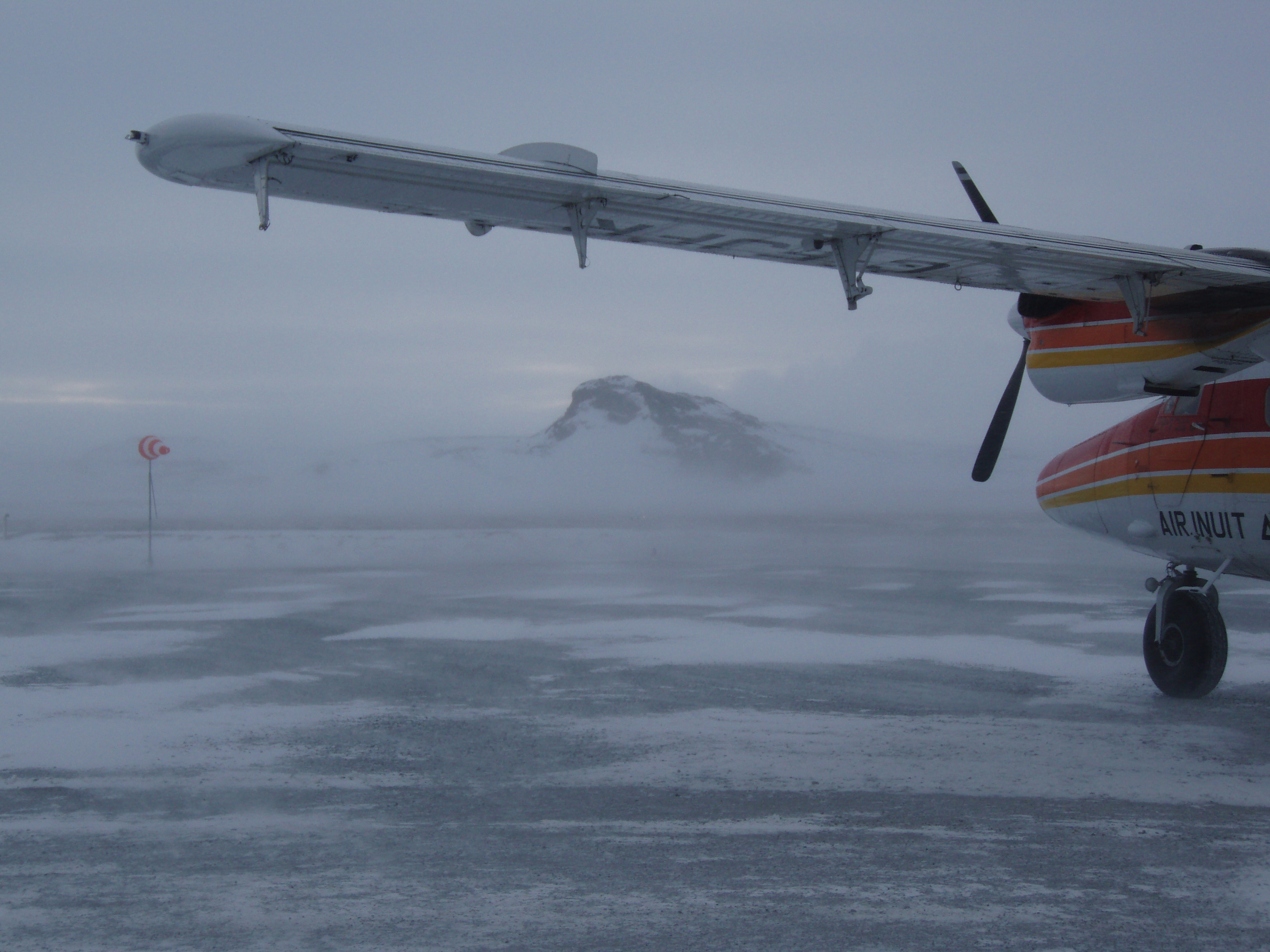
- The airstrip of the Tasiujaq Airport
- IATA: YTQ; ICAO: CYTQ

Summary
- Airport type: Public
- Operator: Administration Régionale Kativik
- Location: Tasiujaq, Quebec
- Time zone: EST (UTC−05:00)
  - Summer (DST): EDT (UTC−04:00)
- Elevation AMSL: 121 ft / 37 m
- Coordinates: 58°40′04″N 069°57′21″W

Map
- Location in Quebec

Runways
Direction	Length		Surface
Direction	ft	m	Surface
05/23	3,519	1,073	Gravel

Statistics (2010)
- Aircraft movements: 1,454
- Source: Canada Flight Supplement; Movements from Statistics Canada

Tasiujaq Airport (IATA: YTQ, ICAO: CYTQ) is located 1.5 nautical miles (2.8 km; 1.7 mi) southwest of Tasiujaq, Quebec, Canada.

== Airlines and destinations ==
Airlines	Destinations
Air Inuit	Aupaluk, Kangirsuk, Kuujjuaq
