= Aupaluk Airport =

Airport in Aupaluk, Quebec, Canada

- IATA: YPJ; ICAO: CYLA

Summary
- Airport type: Public
- Operator: Administration régionale Kativik
- Location: Aupaluk, Quebec
- Time zone: EST (UTC−05:00)
  - Summer (DST): EDT (UTC−04:00)
- Elevation AMSL: 121 ft / 37 m
- Coordinates: 59°17′48″N 069°35′59″W

Map
- Location in Quebec

Runways
Direction	Length		Surface
Direction	ft	m	Surface
04/22	3,521	1,073	Gravel

Statistics (2010)
- Aircraft movements: 1,149
- Source: Canada Flight Supplement; Movements from Statistics Canada

Aupaluk Airport (IATA: YPJ, ICAO: CYLA) is located 0.2 nautical miles (0.37 km; 0.23 mi) east of Aupaluk, Quebec, Canada.

== Airlines and destinations ==
Airlines	Destinations
Air Inuit	Kangirsuk, Kuujjuaq, Tasiujaq
