= Ivujivik Airport =

Airport in Ivujivik, Quebec, Canada

- IATA: YIK; ICAO: CYIK

Summary
- Airport type: Public
- Operator: Administration régionale Kativik
- Location: Ivujivik, Quebec
- Time zone: EST (UTC−05:00)
- Elevation AMSL: 127 ft (39 m)
- Coordinates: 62°25′02″N 077°55′31″W

Map
- Location in Quebec

Runways
Direction	Length		Surface
Direction	ft	m	Surface
07/25	3,521	1,073	Gravel

Statistics (2010)
- Aircraft movements: 1,562
- Source: Canada Flight Supplement; Movements from Statistics Canada

Ivujivik Airport (IATA: YIK, ICAO: CYIK) is a public airport located on the shore of Hudson Bay in Ivujivik, Quebec, Canada. It has a gravel runway 3485' x 100' feet.

== History and Management ==
The airport is owned by the Ministry of Transport and Sustainable Mobility. The day to day operations are carried out by Kativik Regional Government.

== Airlines and destinations ==
Airlines	Destinations
Air Inuit	Akulivik, Inukjuak, Kuujjuarapik, Montreal–Trudeau, Puvirnituq, Salluit, Umiujaq
