= Tasiujaq =

Tasiujaq ᑕᓯᐅᔭᖅ
- Northern village municipality
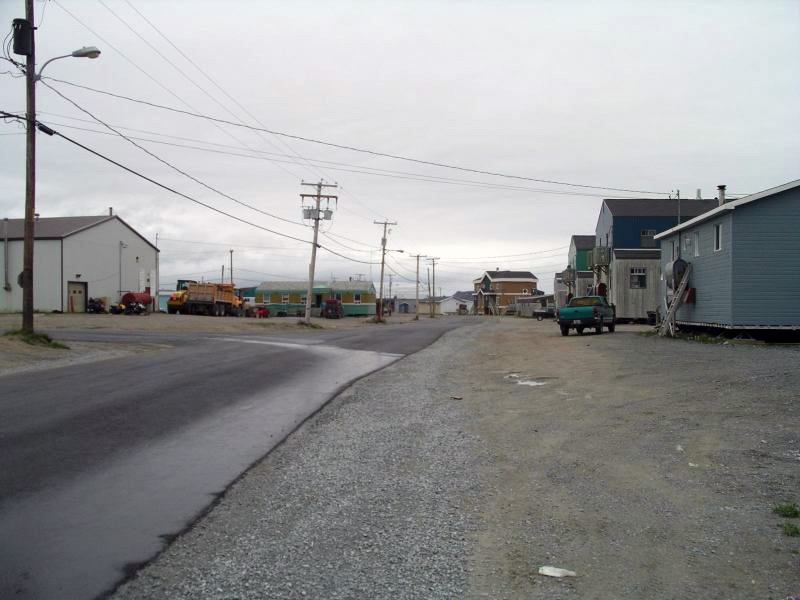

- Location within Quebec
- Coordinates: 58°42′N 69°56′W
- Country: Canada
- Province: Quebec
- Region: Nord-du-Québec
- TE: Kativik
- Constituted: February 2, 1980

Government
  - Mayor: Billy Cain
  - Federal riding: Abitibi—Baie-James—Nunavik—Eeyou
  - Prov. riding: Ungava

Area
  - Total: 67.30 km^{2} (25.98 sq mi)
  - Land: 65.53 km^{2} (25.30 sq mi)

Population (2021)
  - Total: 420
  - Density: 6.4/km^{2} (17/sq mi)
  - Change (2016–21): ▲13.8%
  - Dwellings: 120
- Time zone: UTC−5 (EST)
  - Summer (DST): UTC−4 (EDT)
- Postal code(s): J0M 1T0
- Area code: 819
- Website: www.nvtasiujaq.ca

Tasiujaq (Inuktitut: ᑕᓯᐅᔭᖅ, meaning: Which resembles a lake) is a northern village (Inuit community) in Nunavik, in northern Quebec, Canada. Its population in the Canada 2021 Census was 420.

== Geography ==
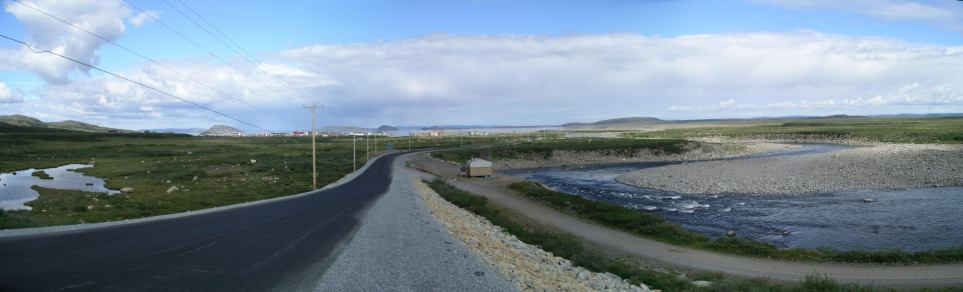
A view of Tasiujaq from the south.

Tasiujaq was built on the shores of Leaf Lake at the head of Deep Harbour and lies a few kilometres north of the tree line, where the shrub tundra finally gives way to the arctic tundra. Tasiujaq actually refers to the whole of Leaf Basin: Leaf Lake, Leaf Passage and Leaf Bay. Leaf Basin is renowned for its high tides, which regularly exceed 15 metres.

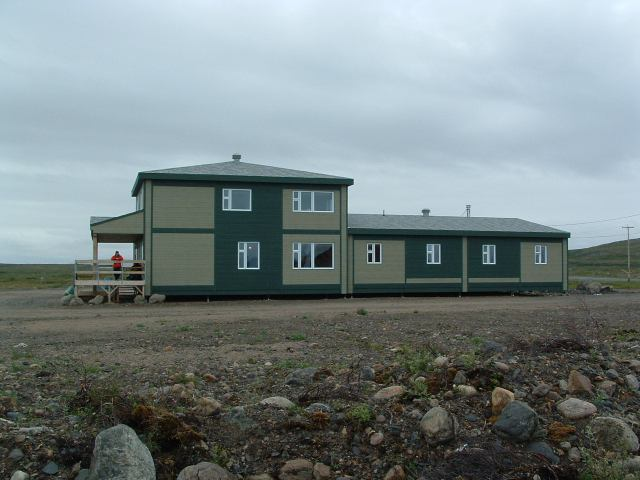
Iqaluppik Hotel on southern edge of Tasiujaq

The bedrock under Tasiujaq consists of sedimentary and metamorphic formations, chiefly sandstone, slate, greywacke and argillite. Iron ore, dolomite, and mafic rocks are nearby.

The region is very rich in marine mammals (seal and beluga), fish (Arctic char, Atlantic salmon, trout), ducks (particularly eider ducks) and many seabirds; also, close to 1000 musk-ox roam the surrounding area. Gyrfalcons and peregrine falcons are commonly found nesting on the islands of Leaf Basin and surrounding cliffs.

Tasiujaq has a low tide harbour five kilometres north of the village, on Rowe Island. The Tasiujaq Airport is located a few kilometres south of the village. Tasiujaq is the final destination for the canoeists paddling down Leaf River.

== Demographics ==
In the 2021 Census of Population conducted by Statistics Canada, Tasiujaq had a population of 420 living in 106 of its 120 total private dwellings, a change of 13.8% from its 2016 population of 369. With a land area of 65.53 km^{2} (25.30 sq mi), it had a population density of 6.4/km^{2} (16.6/sq mi) in 2021.

As with many Inuit villages, there is a large youth contingent. In 2021, 34.5% of the population was below the age of fifteen. The median age was 21.2.

As of 2016, unemployment was at 13.9 percent. The median income for the same census was $26,624 (in Canadian dollars). 48 percent of the workforce walked to work.

Population trend:

- Population in 2021: 420 (2016 to 2021 population change: 13.8%)
- Population in 2016: 369 (2011 to 2016 population change: 21.8%)
- Population in 2011: 303
- Population in 2006: 248
- Population in 2001: 228
- Population in 1996: 191

== History ==
The French fur company Révillon Frères and the Hudson's Bay Company each opened trading posts in 1905 and 1907, respectively, on a site located east of today's settlement. This settlement was along a traditional dogsled route used by Inuit to travel between Kuujjuaq and Kangirsuk. However, both posts had been closed by 1935 without any village ever having developed around them.

In the 1950s, when the federal government opened a school in Kuujjuaq and started delivering social services, many Inuit congregated around the emerging village. The wildlife resources of Kuujjuaq, however, were scarce and many Inuit were forced to rely on governmental financial aid. In 1963, the Northern Quebec directorate of the provincial government, hoping to partially remedy this problem, decided to create a new village on the south shore of Leaf Lake where wildlife resources were more plentiful.

In 1966, with the project about to start, the Inuit families which would relocate were divided as to where their future village should be built. A choice had to be made between a site known as Qaamanialuk Paanga and the site of the old trading posts. Qaamanialuk Paanga was finally selected because it was easily accessible by boats used for summer hunting and fishing, nearby Finger River provided the necessary drinking water, and there was room to construct a landing strip. The new village was subsequently given the name Tasiujaq. The main reason the old trading post site was not selected as the site for the new village was its foreshore (tide land) was dotted with large boulders, and access by boat in summer would have been difficult. In 1971, once the community was organized, a cooperative store was established independently by residents, and is now associated with the Federation of Co-operatives of Northern Quebec. Since 1996, the police services, as the other villages in the Kativik region, are provided by the Kativik Regional Police Force (KRPF).

== Education ==
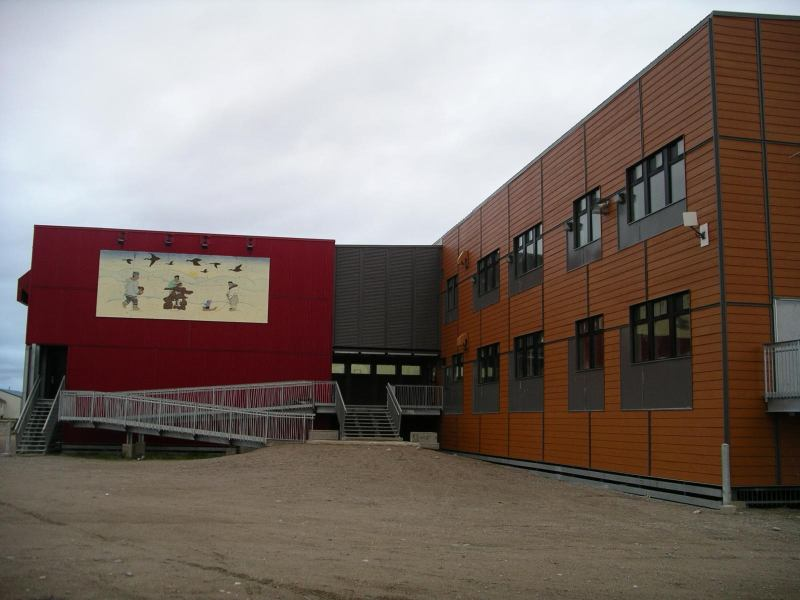
Ajagudak School in Tasiujaq

The Kativik School Board operates the Ajagutak School.
