= Puvirnituq Airport =

Airport in Puvirnituq, Quebec, Canada

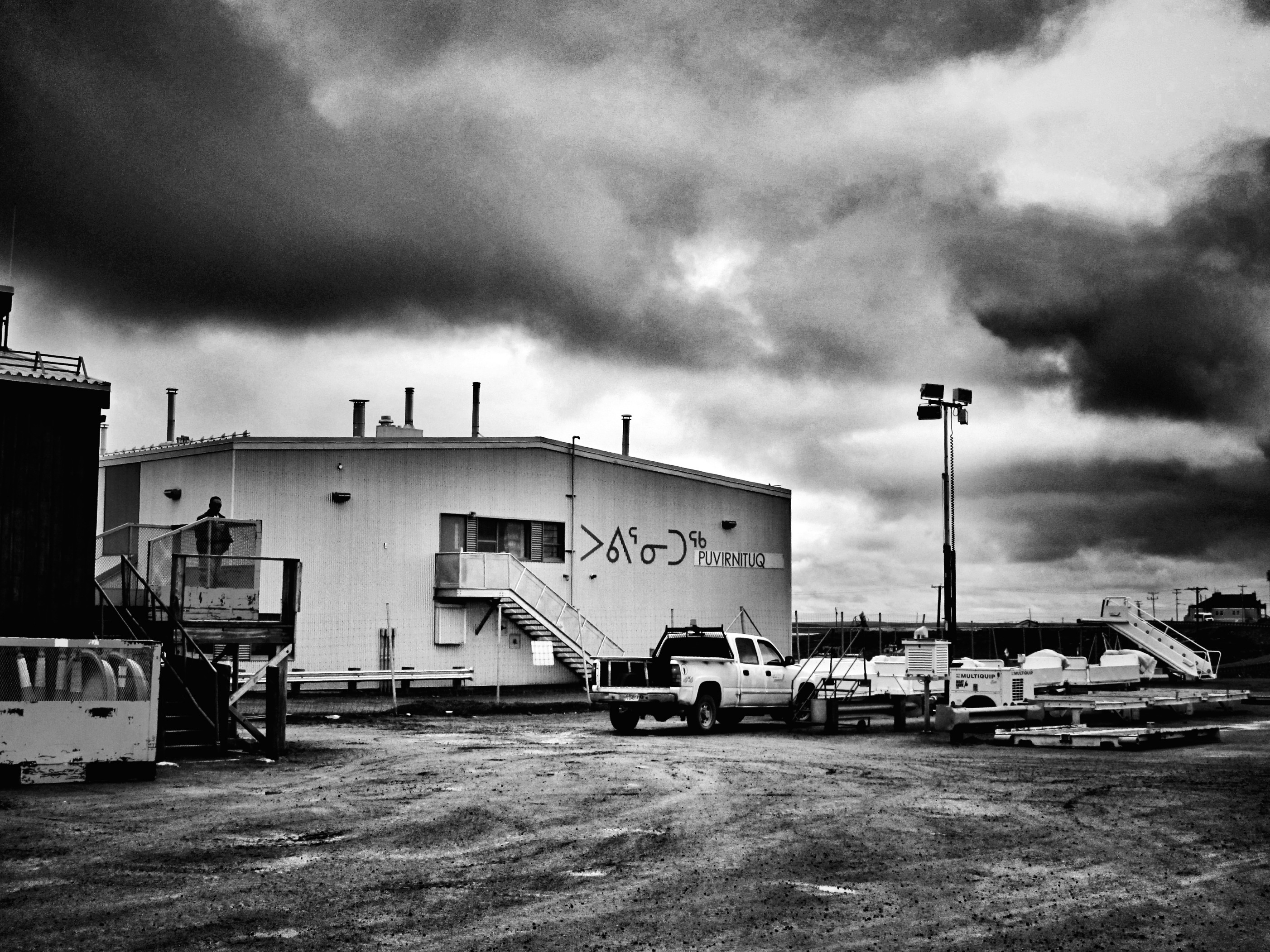
- Puvirnituq Airport terminal
- IATA: YPX; ICAO: CYPX

Summary
- Airport type: Public
- Operator: Administration régionale Kativik
- Location: Puvirnituq, Quebec
- Time zone: EST (UTC−05:00)
  - Summer (DST): EDT (UTC−04:00)
- Elevation AMSL: 83 ft / 25 m
- Coordinates: 60°03′08″N 077°17′15″W

Map
- Location in Quebec

Runways
Direction	Length		Surface
Direction	ft	m	Surface
01/19	6,299	1,920	Gravel

Statistics (2010)
- Aircraft movements: 5,802
- Source: Canada Flight Supplement; Movements from Statistics Canada

Puvirnituq Airport (IATA: YPX, ICAO: CYPX) is an airport located 1 nautical mile (1.9 km; 1.2 mi) north of Puvirnituq, an Inuit community in Nunavik, Quebec, Canada. It is owned by Quebec's Ministry of Transport and operated by the Kativik Regional Government. The airport has a gravel runway and is served by Air Inuit.

== Airlines and destinations ==
Airlines	Destinations
Air Inuit	Akulivik, Inukjuak, Ivujivik, Kuujjuaq, Kuujjuarapik, La Grande, Montreal–Trudeau, Salluit, Umiujaq
