= Kangirsuk Airport =

Airport in Quebec, Canada

- IATA: YKG; ICAO: CYAS

Summary
- Airport type: Public
- Operator: Administration régionale Kativik
- Location: Kangirsuk, Quebec
- Time zone: EST (UTC−05:00)
  - Summer (DST): EDT (UTC−04:00)
- Elevation AMSL: 406 ft / 124 m
- Coordinates: 60°01′38″N 069°59′57″W

Map
- Location in Quebec

Runways
Direction	Length		Surface
Direction	ft	m	Surface
03/21	3,521	1,073	Gravel

Statistics (2010)
- Aircraft movements: 1,954
- Source: Canada Flight Supplement; Movements from Statistics Canada

Kangirsuk Airport (IATA: YKG, ICAO: CYAS) is located 0.5 nautical miles (0.93 km; 0.58 mi) east of Kangirsuk, Quebec, Canada. It has a single gravel runway, Runway 03/21 which is 3521 feet long. It has telephone facilities within the airport terminal. Within a 5 nautical mile range of the airport, patrons have access to food, medical aid and accommodation.

== Airlines and destinations ==
Air Inuit regularly flies scheduled flights in and out of the airport with the de Havilland Dash 8-300 (DH3) and the de Havilland Canada DHC-6 Twin Otter. Air Inuit provides the following destinations from Kangirsuk Airport:

Airlines	Destinations
Air Inuit	Aupaluk, Kangiqsujuaq, Kuujjuaq, Quaqtaq, Salluit, Tasiujaq
