= Umiujaq Airport =

- IATA: YUD; ICAO: CYMU

Summary
- Airport type: Public
- Operator: Administration régionale Kativik
- Location: Umiujaq, Quebec
- Time zone: EST (UTC−05:00)
  - Summer (DST): EDT (UTC−04:00)
- Elevation AMSL: 251 ft / 77 m
- Coordinates: 56°32′10″N 076°31′06″W

Map
- Location in Quebec CYMU (Canada)

Runways
Direction	Length		Surface
Direction	ft	m	Surface
02/20	3,521	1,073	Gravel

Statistics (2010)
- Aircraft movements: 2,128
- Source: Canada Flight Supplement; Movements from Statistics Canada

Umiujaq Airport (IATA: YUD, ICAO: CYMU) is a public airport located near the town of Umiujaq, Quebec, Canada. It is operated by the Kativik Regional Government since late 1996. The airport has one gravel runway designated runway 02/20. The runway is 3,521 feet (1,073 meters) long and 100 feet (30 meters) wide.

== Airlines and destinations ==
Airlines	Destinations
Air Inuit	Akulivik, Inukjuak, Ivujivik, Kuujjuarapik, Montreal–Trudeau, Puvirnituq, Salluit, Sanikiluaq
