= Sanikiluaq Airport =

Airport in Sanikiluaq, Nunavut, Canada

- IATA: YSK; ICAO: CYSK

Summary
- Airport type: Public
- Operator: Government of Nunavut
- Location: Sanikiluaq, Nunavut
- Time zone: EST (UTC−05:00)
  - Summer (DST): EDT (UTC−04:00)
- Elevation AMSL: 110 ft (34 m)
- Coordinates: 56°32′13″N 079°15′00″W

Map
- Location in Nunavut

Runways
Direction	Length		Surface
Direction	ft	m	Surface
09/27	3,807	1,160	Gravel

Statistics (2010)
- Aircraft movements: 1,190
- Source: Canada Flight Supplement; Movements from Statistics Canada.

Sanikiluaq Airport (IATA: YSK, ICAO: CYSK) is located at Sanikiluaq, Nunavut, Canada, and is operated by the Government of Nunavut. It is one of the few airports in Nunavut that uses magnetic headings for the runway rather than true headings.

== Airlines and destinations ==
Airlines	Destinations
Air Inuit	Kuujjuarapik, Umiujaq
Calm Air	Winnipeg
Panorama Aviation	Charter: Iqaluit

== Accidents and incidents ==
- On December 22, 2012, a Fairchild Metro III twin-engine turboprop aircraft belonging to Perimeter Aviation but chartered by Kivalliq Air crashed near the end of the runway at Sanikiluaq Airport, killing a 6-month-old baby and injuring the 8 other people on board. The official TSB report, released in 2015, attributed the accident to pilot error. The crew performed an unstable tailwind approach, which was followed by a go-around procedure with insufficient climb performance, resulting in a collision with the terrain. The infant passenger, being the sole fatality, was not restrained in a child restraint system, nor was one required by regulations.
