= Yuendumu Airport =

Airport in the Northern Territory, Australia

- IATA: YUE; ICAO: YYND

Summary
- Airport type: Public
- Owner: Yuendumu Community Government Council
- Elevation AMSL: 2,205 ft / 672 m
- Coordinates: 22°15′15″S 131°46′55″E

Map
- Location in the Northern Territory

Runways
Direction	Length		Surface
Direction	m	ft	Surface
12/30		4,724
- Sources: AIP

Yuendumu Airport (IATA: YUE, ICAO: YYND) is an airport in Yuendumu, Northern Territory, Australia.

== See also ==
- List of airports in the Northern Territory
