= Quaqtaq Airport =

- IATA: YQC; ICAO: CYHA

Summary
- Airport type: Public
- Operator: Administration Régionale Kativik
- Location: Quaqtaq, Quebec
- Time zone: EST (UTC−05:00)
  - Summer (DST): EDT (UTC−04:00)
- Elevation AMSL: 106 ft / 32 m
- Coordinates: 61°02′47″N 069°37′04″W

Map
- Location in Quebec

Runways
Direction	Length		Surface
Direction	ft	m	Surface
18/36	3,520	1,073	Gravel

Statistics (2010)
- Aircraft movements: 1,495
- Source: Canada Flight Supplement; Movements from Statistics Canada

Quaqtaq Airport (IATA: YQC, ICAO: CYHA) is located near Quaqtaq, Quebec, Canada. Due to the landfill northeast of the runway birds and dogs may be encountered.

== Airlines and destinations ==
Airlines	Destinations
Air Inuit	Kangiqsujuaq, Kangirsuk, Kuujjuaq, Salluit
