= Kuujjuarapik Airport =

Airport in Kuujjuarapik, Quebec, Canada

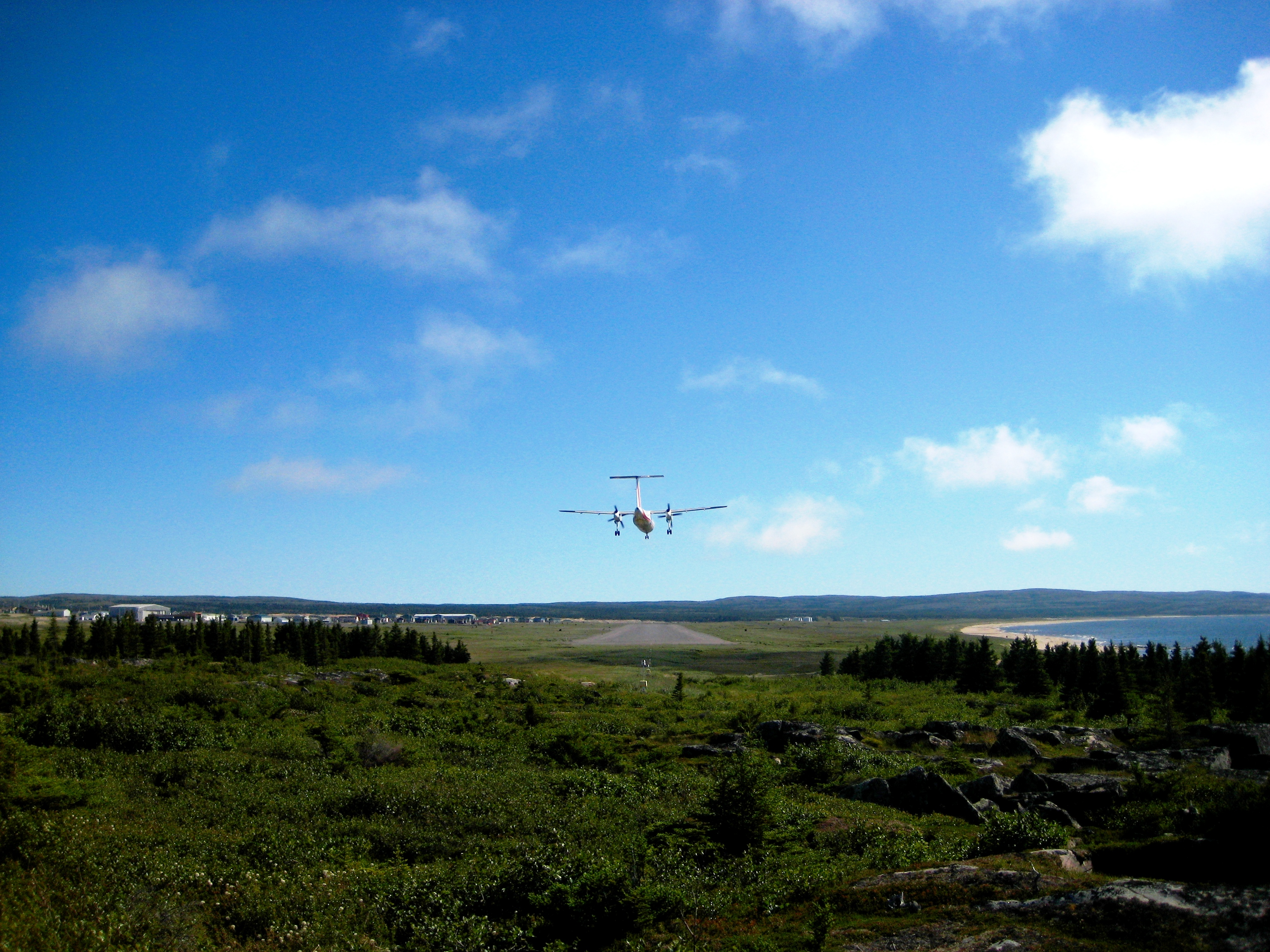
- IATA: YGW; ICAO: CYGW

Summary
- Airport type: Public
- Operator: Administration régionale Kativik
- Serves: Kuujjuarapik, Whapmagoostui
- Location: Kuujjuarapik
- Time zone: EST (UTC−05:00)
  - Summer (DST): EDT (UTC−04:00)
- Elevation AMSL: 40 ft (12 m)
- Coordinates: 55°16′55″N 077°45′55″W

Map
- Location in Quebec

Runways
Direction	Length		Surface
Direction	ft	m	Surface
03/21	5,082	1,549	Gravel

Statistics (2010)
- Aircraft movements: 6,388
- Sources: Canada Flight Supplement; Movements from Statistics Canada

Kuujjuarapik Airport (IATA: YGW, ICAO: CYGW) is located adjacent to the Inuit community of Kuujjuarapik, Quebec, Canada. It also serves the nearby Cree community of Whapmagoostui.

== Airlines and destinations ==
Airlines	Destinations
Air Creebec	Chisasibi, Eastmain, Montreal–Trudeau, Val-d'Or, Waskaganish, Wemindji
Air Inuit	Akulivik, Inukjuak, Ivujivik, La Grande, Montreal–Trudeau, Puvirnituq, Salluit, Sanikiluaq, Umiujaq
