= Inukjuak Airport =

Airport in Inukjuak, Quebec, Canada

- IATA: YPH; ICAO: CYPH; WMO: 71907

Summary
- Airport type: Public
- Operator: Kativik Regional Government (Administration régionale Kativik)
- Location: Inukjuak, Quebec
- Time zone: EST (UTC−05:00)
  - Summer (DST): EDT (UTC−04:00)
- Elevation AMSL: 86 ft (26 m)
- Coordinates: 58°28′19″N 078°04′37″W

Map
- Location in Quebec

Runways
Direction	Length		Surface
Direction	ft	m	Surface
06/24	3,520	1,073	Gravel

Statistics (2010)
- Aircraft movements: 2,766
- Source: Canada Flight Supplement; Environment Canada; Movements from Statistics Canada

Inukjuak Airport (IATA: YPH, ICAO: CYPH) is located adjacent to Inukjuak, Quebec, Canada.

== Airlines and destinations ==
Airlines	Destinations
Air Inuit	Akulivik, Ivujivik, Kuujjuaq, Kuujjuarapik, Montreal–Trudeau, Puvirnituq, Salluit, Umiujaq
