= Nunavik Police Service =

Nunavik Police Service: Service de police du Nunavik (French); ᓄᓇᕕᒻᒥ ᐳᓖᓰᑦ ᐱᒍᑦᔨᔨᖏᑦ (Inuktitut)
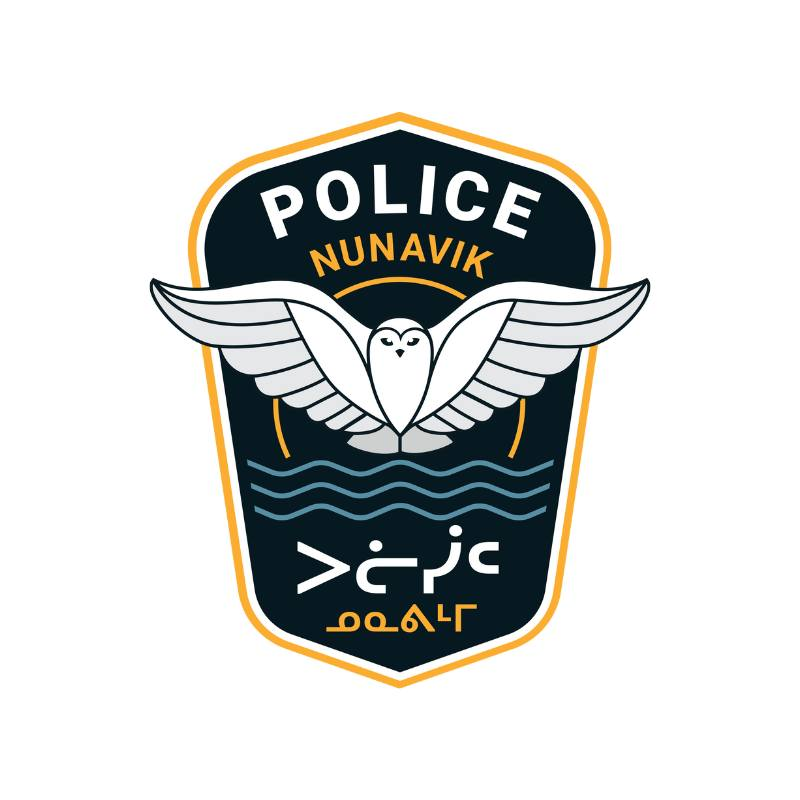
- Common name: Nunavik Police
- Abbreviation: NPS
- Motto: Serve and protect

Agency overview
- Formed: April 1, 1995
- Preceding agency: Kativik Regional Police Force
- Annual budget: $112.4 million (2024)

Jurisdictional structure
- Operations jurisdiction: Canada

Operational structure
- Headquarters: Kuujjuaq, Quebec, Canada
- Sworn members: 200
- Agency executive: Jean-François Bernier, Chief of Police

Facilities
- Detachments: 14

Website
- www.nunavikpolice.ca/en/

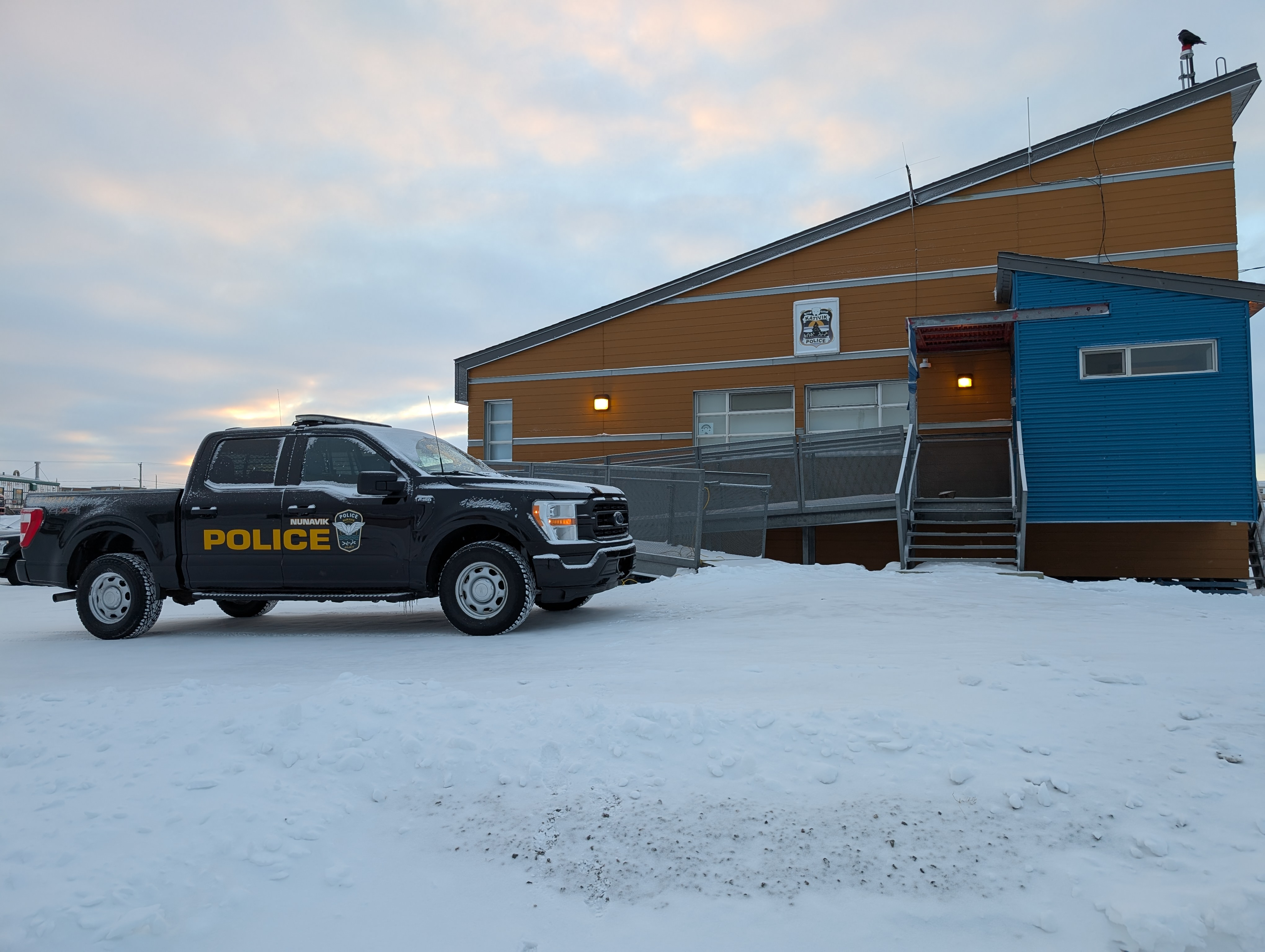
Nunavik Police Station in Quaqtaq

The Nunavik Police Service (NPS; French: Service de police du Nunavik, SPN; Inuktitut: ᓄᓇᕕᒻᒥ ᐳᓖᓰᑦ ᐱᒍᑦᔨᔨᖏᑦ) delivers regular policing services in the 14 remote northern villages of the Kativik Region. The headquarters of the NPS are in Kuujjuaq, and detachments operate in each community. The service was formerly called the Kativik Regional Police Force (KRPF, French: Corps de police régional Kativik, CPRK) until renamed on February 25, 2021.

In accordance with the First Nations Policing Program, the governments of Canada and Quebec, respectively, provide 52% and 48% of funding for the NPS under a tripartite agreement with the Kativik Regional Government.

== Mission statement ==
Pursuant to the Police Act, the mission of the NPS is to maintain peace, order and public security, to prevent and repress crime and offences under the law and municipal by-laws of the Kativik Region, and to apprehend offenders.

In pursuing its mission, the NPS ensures the safety of persons and property, safeguards rights and freedoms, respects and remains attentive to the needs of victims, and cooperates with the northern villages of the Kativik Region in a manner consistent with cultural pluralism.

== History ==
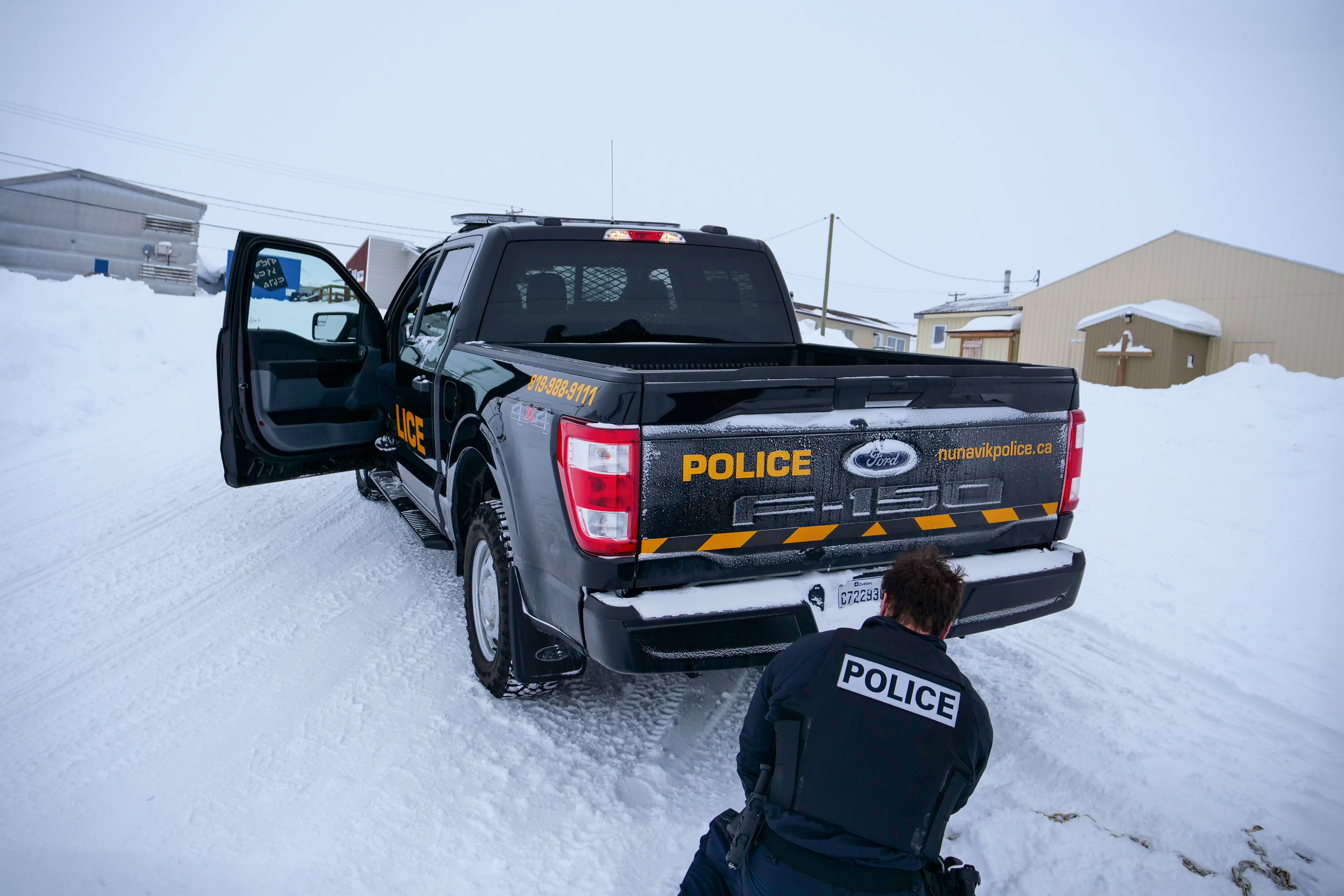
An officer in Puvirnituq attaching a tow chain to his truck

The Royal Canadian Mounted Police (RCMP) delivered policing services to the inhabitants of Northern Quebec until 1961, when these services were assumed by the Sûreté du Québec. The Kativik Regional Police Force was established in 1995 in accordance with the spirit of the James Bay and Northern Québec Agreement signed in 1975 and pursuant to sections 369 and 370 of the Act Respecting Northern Villages and the Kativik Regional Government. The KRPF began delivering services on April 1, 1996. In 2021, the KRPF changed its name to the Nunavik Police Service.

The NPS has police stations in the following remote communities:

- Akulivik
- Aupaluk
- Inukjuak
- Ivujivik
- Kangirsuk
- Kangiqsualujjuaq
- Kangiqsujuaq
- Kuujjuaq (Headquarters)
- Kuujjuarapik
- Puvirnituq
- Quaqtaq
- Salluit
- Tasiujaq
- Umiujaq

== Ranks ==
Commissioned officers
Chief	Deputy chief	Captain
Jean-François Bernier	Operations: Jean-François Morin Operational Support & Administration: Shaun Longstreet	East Division (North Sector) East Division (South Sector) West Division (North Sector) West Division (South Sector) Operational Support

== Mascot ==
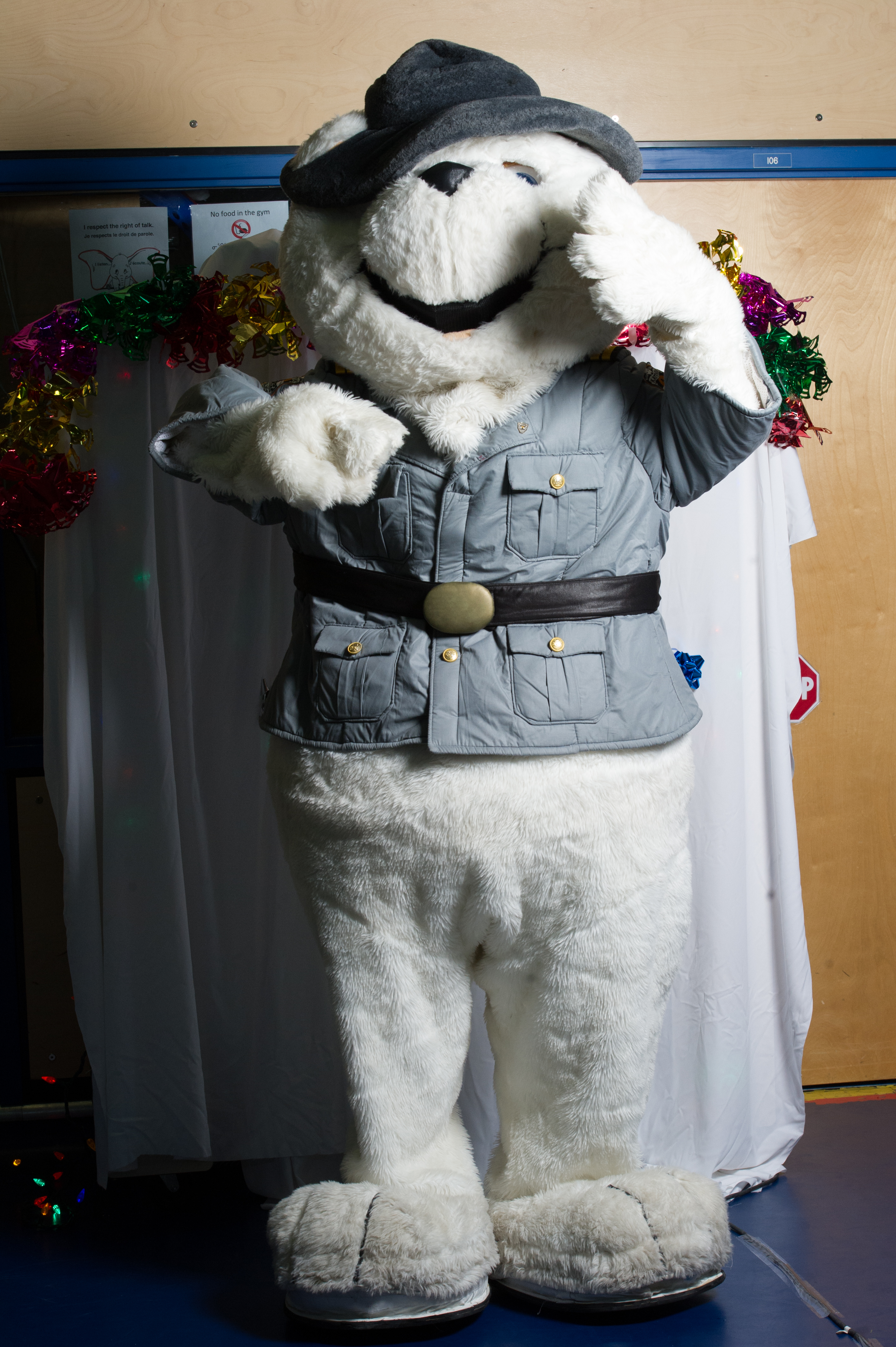
Nanuk in December 2017

The official mascot of the NPS is named Nanuk, the word for polar bear in Inuktitut. His place of residence has not been identified, but he has been seen in various communities around Nunavik. He especially likes events related to prevention and awareness, and there have also been several reported sightings of him in community parties.
