= Kuujjuaq Airport =

Airport in Kuujjuaq, Quebec, Canada

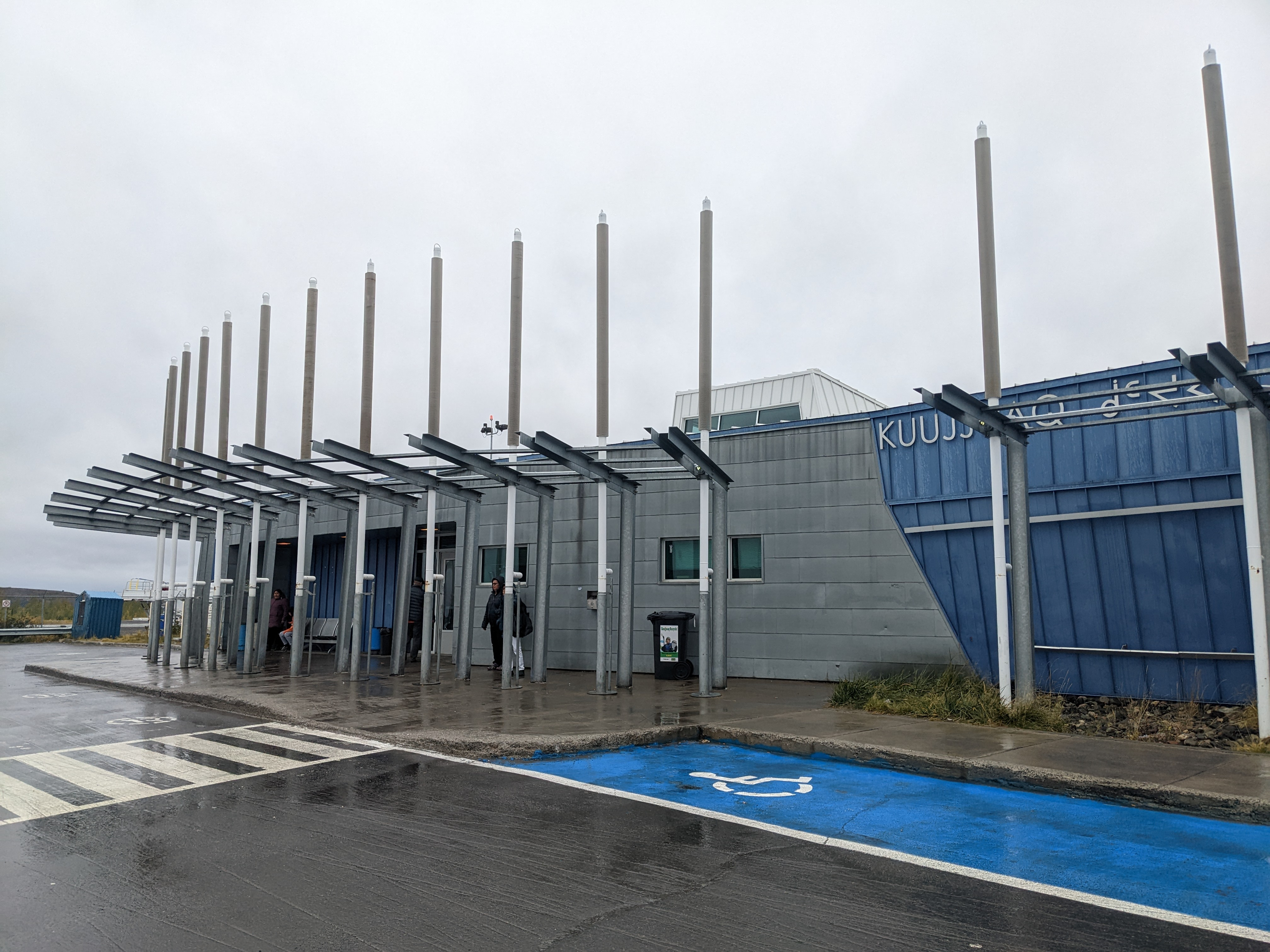
- IATA: YVP; ICAO: CYVP; WMO: 71906

Summary
- Airport type: Public
- Operator: Administration régionale Kativik
- Location: Kuujjuaq, Quebec
- Hub for: Air Inuit
- Time zone: EST (UTC−05:00)
  - Summer (DST): EDT (UTC−04:00)
- Elevation AMSL: 131 ft (40 m)
- Coordinates: 58°05′42″N 068°25′20″W

Map
- Location in Quebec CYVP (Canada)

Runways
| Direction | Length | | Surface |
| Direction | ft | m | Surface |
|---|---|---|---|
| 07/25 | 6,000 | 1,829 | Asphalt |
| 13/31 | 5,001 | 1,524 | Gravel |

Statistics (2010)
- Aircraft movements: 12,485
- Sources: Canada Flight Supplement; Environment Canada; Movements from Statistics Canada

Kuujjuaq Airport (IATA: YVP, ICAO: CYVP) is an airport located 1.5 nautical miles (2.8 km; 1.7 mi) southwest of Kuujjuaq, Quebec, Canada.

== History ==
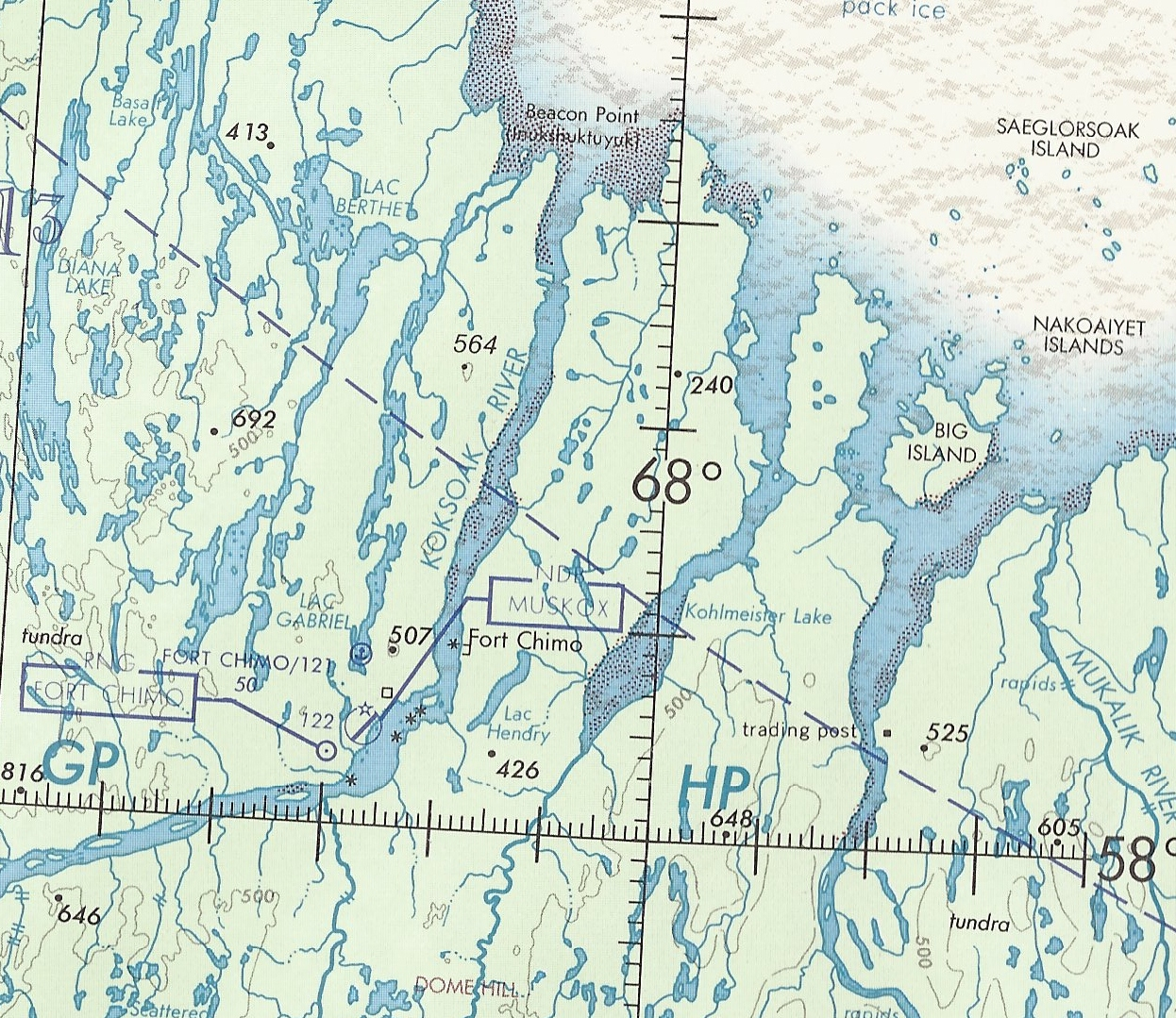
Fort Chimo and Koksoak River Estuary. USDOD ONC D-15, 1971.

The airport site at Fort Chimo was located and surveyed on 12 July 1941 by a United States Army Air Forces (USAAF) team under Captain Elliott Roosevelt, operating by amphibious aircraft out of Gander, Newfoundland and Labrador. The chosen site was 5 mi (8.0 km) upstream from the trading post, on the opposite shore. River access was difficult due to shifting, sandy banks and ice and high tides in the estuary. Code-named Crystal I, Fort Chimo was founded on 10 October 1941 by a 12-man weather station and radio communications crew under Antarctic veteran and former Lieutenant Commander, Isaac Schlossbach. Runway construction commenced next summer. The Crystal stations were part of the Crimson East project for trans-Atlantic ferry flights, Chimo being referred to as "Bookie". Fort Chimo did not actually serve in this intended capacity, but the station was useful for weather reporting, communications, and local support duties. Canada officially took control in 1944, although American crews remained for a period. Seasonal resupply was by United States Coast Guard cutters.

Fort Chimo was one of three "Crystal" sites in the Canadian Arctic, Frobisher Bay Air Base, Northwest Territories (now Iqaluit Airport, Nunavut) being "Crystal II", and a station on Padloping Island being "Crystal III". A detachment of the 8th Weather Squadron, Air Transport Command (ATC) took up residence at the station on 1 October 1942. The initial mission of the Crystal sites was to provide long-range weather information to the combat forces then building up in the United Kingdom.

Crystal I was planned to be a transport hub between the Eastern Route, which originated at Presque Isle Air Force Base (now Presque Isle International Airport), Maine, and the Central Route, which originated at Romulus Army Airfield (Detroit Airport), Michigan. From Crystal I, the aircraft would be ferried via Baffin Island; Greenland; Iceland and delivered to Scotland. The development of the Mid-Atlantic Transport through the Azores and improved performance of the Gander-Iceland main route led to the cancellation of the Crimson Route project in 1943. The United States presence at Crystal I was reduced to a skeleton weather squadron; which ended in 1945, and the facilities were turned over to the Canadian government.

Nav Canada opened a $7-million air traffic control facility near the airport. The radar station allows controllers in Montreal to monitor the steady stream of transatlantic air traffic over northern Quebec.

A large-scale terminal expansion project was carried out at the airport between 2006 and 2008. The $14.9 million project included the expansion of the airport apron and the construction of a brand new 1,225 m^{2} (13,190 sq ft) terminal to replace the cramped building built in 1972. The building, designed by architect Alain Fournier, received a silver certification under the Canadian Leadership in Energy and Environmental Design (LEED) program.

== Operations ==
Kuujjuaq Airport is a mandatory frequency airport with an operating flight service station.

== Airlines and destinations ==
=== Airlines and destinations ===
| Airlines | Destinations |
|---|---|
| Air Inuit | Aupaluk, Inukjuak, Kangiqsualujjuaq, Kangiqsujuaq, Kangirsuk, Montréal–Trudeau, Puvirnituq, Quaqtaq, Québec City, Salluit, Tasiujaq |
| Canadian North | Iqaluit, Ottawa |
