= Air Labrador =

Canadian regional airline

IATA	ICAO	Call sign
WJ	LAL	LAB AIR
- Founded: 1948
- Ceased operations: June 2017
- Hubs: Goose Bay Airport
- Focus cities: Lourdes-de-Blanc-Sablon Airport, Quebec
- Frequent-flyer program: None
- Alliance: None
- Fleet size: 9
- Destinations: 24
- Headquarters: Goose Bay Airport
- Key people: Philip Earle (President); Brent Acreman (Director of Flight Operations); Dan Michelin (Chief Pilot)

Labrador Airways Limited, operating as Air Labrador, was a regional airline based at the Goose Bay Airport in Happy Valley-Goose Bay, Newfoundland and Labrador, Canada. It operated scheduled daily passenger and freight services throughout Labrador and Quebec, as well as charter operations with the options of landing in remote and off strip destinations with skis, wheels and floats. The airline's main base was Goose Bay Airport, with a secondary hub at Lourdes-de-Blanc-Sablon Airport, Quebec. Its motto was "The Spirit of Flight" (French: "Esprit du vol").

== History ==
The airline was established and started operations in 1948, as Newfoundland Airways operating float-equipped aircraft from a base in Gander, Newfoundland on charter, mail and freight work to northern Newfoundland and Labrador. Since then the base of the company has moved to Goose Bay. It was purchased in 1983 by Provincial Investments Inc., owned by Roger Pike, along with associate company, Labrador Aviation Services Ltd. Air Labrador was owned by the Pike Family, but then taken over by Philip Earle in 2010. Air Labrador conducted a fantasy flight in the 1990s with a Santa Claus visit on board while it taxied the tarmac. In March 2009, the company announced they were ceasing flight service to Montreal due to financial trouble. Airline service ended in Newfoundland in May 2009, two months after announcing the shut down of Montreal operations. The airline later continued to fly within Labrador and Quebec, as well as St. Anthony, Newfoundland and Labrador until its merger in 2017.

On February 3, 2012, the company announced that the Nunatsiavut Government had bought a 51% share in Air Labrador.

In June 2017 Air Labrador merged with Innu Mikun Airlines to form Air Borealis.

== Destinations ==
Air Labrador operates services to the following domestic scheduled destinations (as of February 2017):

=== Newfoundland and Labrador ===
- Goose Bay (CFB Goose Bay)
- Hopedale (Hopedale Airport)
- Makkovik (Makkovik Airport)
- Nain (Nain Airport)
- Natuashish (Natuashish Airport)
- Postville (Postville Airport)
- Rigolet (Rigolet Airport)
- Deer Lake, Newfoundland and Labrador (Deer Lake Regional Airport)

=== Quebec ===
- Blanc-Sablon (Lourdes-de-Blanc-Sablon Airport)
- Chevery (Chevery Airport)
- Kegaska (Kegaska Airport)
- La Romaine (La Romaine Airport)
- La Tabatière (La Tabatière Airport)
- Natashquan (Natashquan Airport)
- Saint-Augustin (Saint-Augustin Airport)
- Sept-Îles (Sept-Îles Airport)
- Tête-à-La-Baleine (Tête-à-La-Baleine Airport)

== Fleet ==
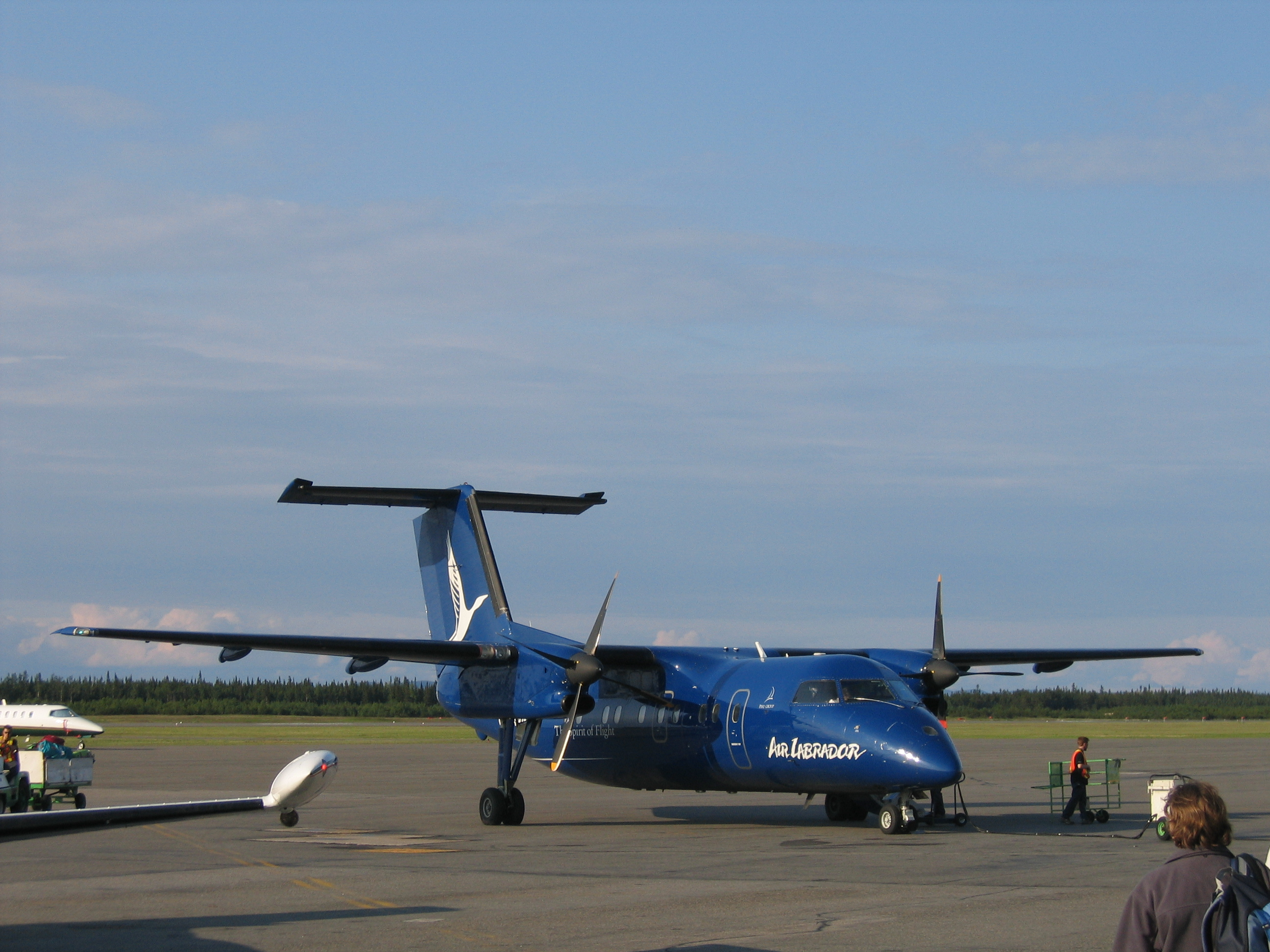
Air Labrador Dash 8 at Sept-Îles Airport (aircraft now retired from the fleet)

As of July 2017 Transport Canada listed 9 aircraft registered to Air Labrador.

Fleet
Aircraft	No. of aircraft	Variants	Notes
Beechcraft 1900	2	1900D	Up to 19 passengers
Beechcraft King Air	1	100 Series	Up to 9 passengers
De Havilland Canada DHC-6 Twin Otter	6	300 Series	Up to 19 passengers

== See also ==
- List of defunct airlines of Canada
