= Air Liaison =

Canadian regional airline

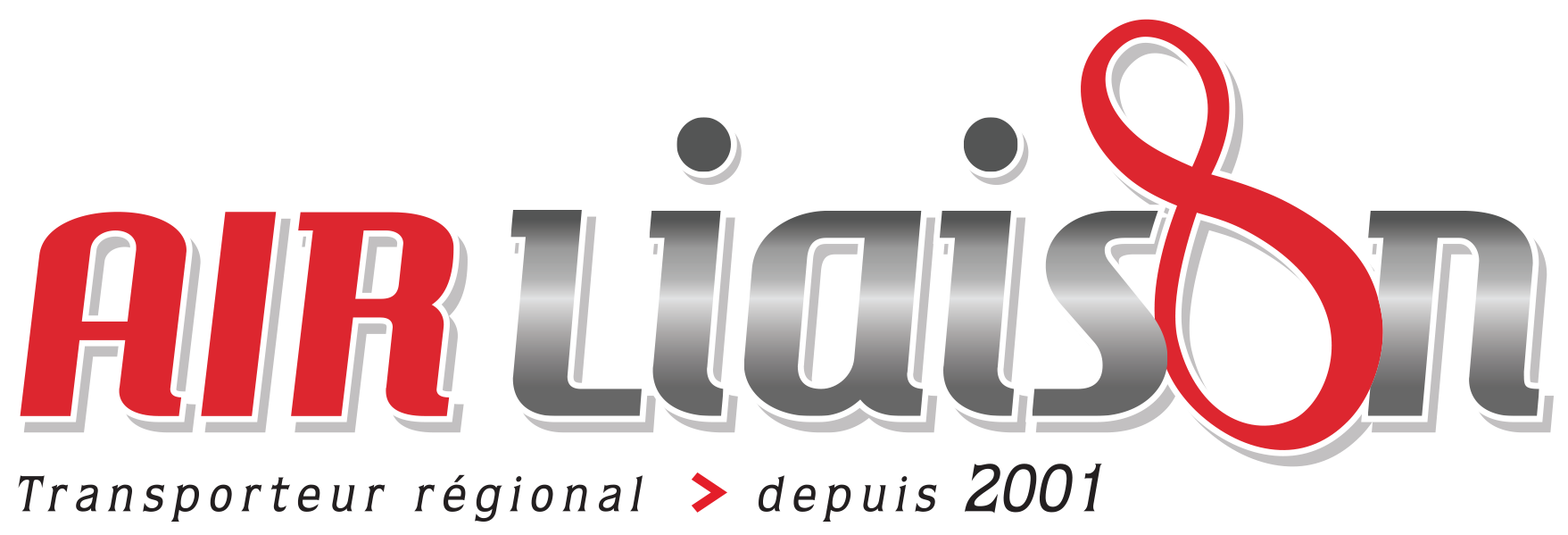

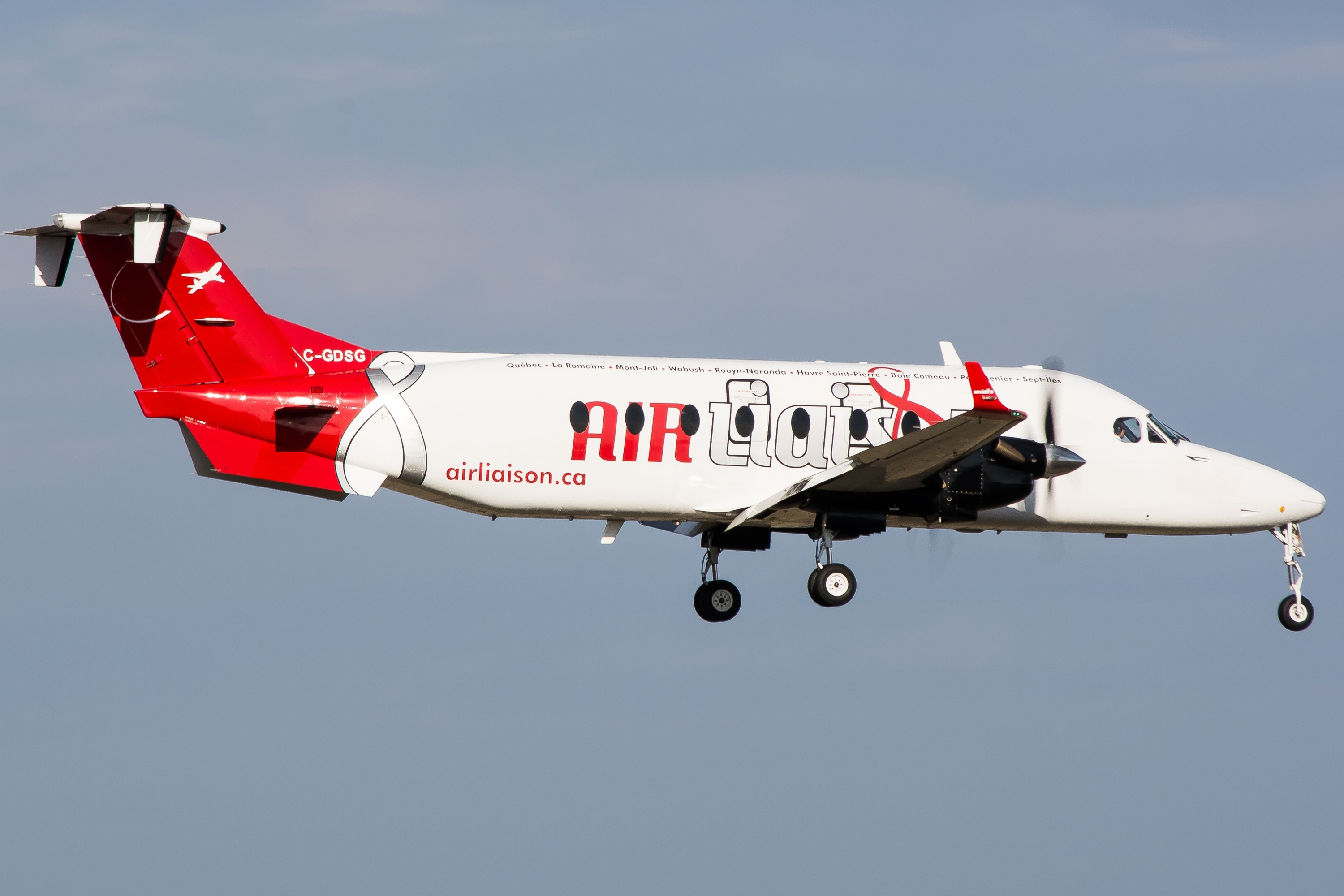
- Air Liaison Beechcraft 1900D, 2015
IATA	ICAO	Call sign
DU	LSJ	LIAISON
- Founded: 2001
- Operating bases: Québec City Jean Lesage International Airport
- Fleet size: 13
- Destinations: 15
- Parent company: Groupe La Québécoise
- Website: www.airliaison.ca

Skyjet MG o/a Air Liaison is a regional airline based in Quebec City, Quebec with its base being the Québec City Jean Lesage International Airport. It operates scheduled flights to 15 domestic destinations from Monday to Friday, and has a morning-only schedule on Sundays.

Air Liaison partners with Waterloo-based Pivot Airlines, and allows the company to offer flights on a Montreal-to-Sept-Îles corridor done by a Bombardier CRJ 200.

== Destinations ==
Air Liaison began serving Montréal–Trudeau International Airport on September 10, 2020, though the company switched to a close by, South-Shore-located airport in Saint-Hubert, near Longueuil. Air Liaison operates scheduled services to the following domestic destinations (as of Apr. 2025):

=== Scheduled flights ===
Province	Community/City	IATA	ICAO	Airport
Quebec	Baie-Comeau	YBC	CYBC	Baie-Comeau Airport
Quebec	Blanc-Sablon	YBX	CYBX	Lourdes-de-Blanc-Sablon Airport
Quebec	Chevery	YHR	CYHR	Chevery Airport
Quebec	Havre-Saint-Pierre	YGV	CYGV	Havre Saint-Pierre Airport
Quebec	La Romaine	ZGS	CTT5	La Romaine Airport
Quebec	La Tabatière	ZLT	CTU5	La Tabatière Airport
Quebec	Saint-Hubert	YHU	CYHU	Montreal Metropolitan Airport
Quebec	Natashquan	YNA	CYNA	Natashquan Airport
Quebec	Port-Menier	YPN	CYPN	Port-Menier Airport
Quebec	Quebec City	YQB	CYQB	Québec City Jean Lesage International Airport
Quebec	Rouyn-Noranda	YUY	CYUY	Rouyn-Noranda Airport
Quebec	Saint-Augustin	YIF	CYIF	Saint-Augustin Airport
Quebec	Sept-Îles	YZV	CYZV	Sept-Îles Airport
Quebec	Tête-à-la-Baleine	ZTB	CTB6	Tête-à-la-Baleine Airport
Quebec	Val-d'Or	YVO	CYVO	Val-d'Or Airport

== Fleet ==
As of May 2025, Transport Canada listed 13 aircraft registered with Air Liaison.

Air Liaison fleet
Aircraft	No. of aircraft TC)	Variants	Notes
Beechcraft King Air	1	Model 100	
Beechcraft Super King Air	2	Super King Air 200	
Beechcraft 1900	8	1900D	
Cessna 208B Caravan	1		Cargo-only plane
Learjet 45	1		
Total	13		

== Charter and medevac services ==
In addition to scheduled flights, in 2015 Air Liaison began offering medical-evacuation services for eastern Quebec. Air Liaison also offers charter services across Canada and the United States.
