= Aéropro Flight 201 =

2010 aviation accident in Canada

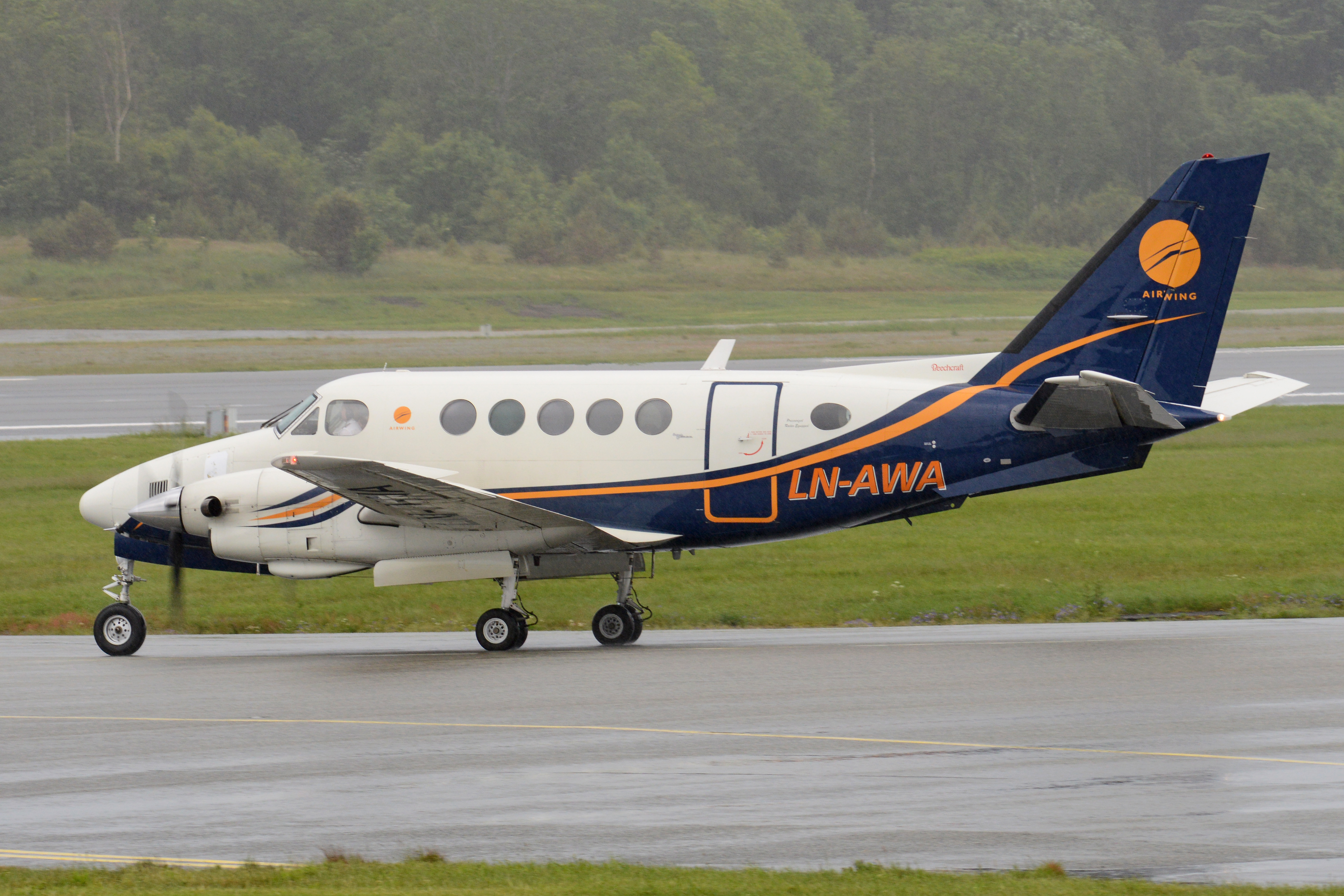
- A Beehcraft A100 King Air, similar to the one involved

Accident
- Date: 23 June 2010
- Summary: Engine failure leading to pilot error
- Site: Near Québec City Jean Lesage International Airport, Quebec, Canada; 46°47′41.7″N 71°26′11.9″W

Aircraft
- Aircraft type: Beechcraft A100 King Air
- Operator: Aeropro
- ICAO flight No.: APO201
- Call sign: AEROPRO 201
- Registration: C-FGIN
- Flight origin: Québec City Jean Lesage International Airport, Quebec, Canada
- 1st stopover: Sept-Îles Airport, Quebec, Canada
- Destination: Natashquan Airport, Quebec, Canada
- Occupants: 7
- Passengers: 5
- Crew: 2
- Fatalities: 7
- Survivors: 0

On 23 June 2010, a Beechcraft A100 King Air operating as Aéropro Flight 201, a regional flight in Quebec, Canada, from Quebec City Airport to Natashquan Airport, with a stopover in Sept-Îles Airport, crashed shortly after takeoff from Quebec City Airport, killing all seven people on board.

The investigation on the accident found out that engine problems, and the errors made by the pilots in handling them, were the cause of the crash.

== Background ==
=== Aircraft ===
The aircraft involved in the accident was a Beechcraft A100 King Air registered as C-FGIN and manufactured in 1974.

=== Passengers and crew ===
On board the aircraft at the time of the accident there were five passengers and two crew members, who were the aircraft pilots. The captain of the flight was hired by Aéropro about a month before the accident, he had a total of 3046 flight hours, of which 1677 were on the King Air; the first officer had a total of 2335 flight hours, of which 455 were on the King Air.

== Accident ==
The aircraft was scheduled to fly from Québec City Jean Lesage International Airport, Quebec, to Natashquan Airport, Quebec, with an intermediate stopover in Sept-Îles Airport, Quebec.

At 5:59 local time the aircraft departed Quebec City with five passengers and two pilots on board, on takeoff the aircraft rotated at a speed of 100 knots and reached a maximum speed of 121 knots. Six seconds after lifting off, when the aircraft was still flying over the runway, its speed decreased to 115 knots and in the following seconds the aircraft speed continued to decrease, while the plane turned right and reached its maximum altitude of around 79 meters. Soon after the crew contacted the departure air traffic control and informed them that they'll be diverting back to Quebec City due to an engine issue; landing priority was given to Flight 201 and emergency services were alerted.

Soon after the first officer reported to ATC that they lost control of the aircraft, Flight 201 disappeared from radar and, ten seconds after this last communication, crashed into a field located about 3 kilometers from the airport. All seven people on board the aircraft were killed.

== Investigation ==
The Transportation Safety Board of Canada launched an investigation into the accident. The investigation found that a poor safety culture was practiced by the airline Aeropro. The issues encountered by the pilots during flight were not written down, but only told by them to the maintenance team, that would then occasionally go to repair them. Also, the pilots hadn't been trained enough in emergency procedures.

In the final report on the accident, that was released in July 2012, the investigators found out that, shortly after takeoff, the aircraft had a problem to its right engine that resulted in a loss of thrust. The pilots, who were following the procedures told to them by the airline, were not coordinated enough and didn't understand the severity of the situation. This lack of coordination made them forget to feather the problematic engine, and this, combined with the reduced thrust, caused an excess of drag and the subsequent loss of control. It was also pointed out that the impact with a berm and the upside down position in which the aircraft ended up, exacerbated the effects of the crash and prevented any occcupant from surviving.

== Aftermath ==
Shortly after the crash Jacques Paillard, Aeropro's vice-president, commented saying that "he was baffled on what could have caused the plane to crash", adding that the King Air was built to still operate after a single engine failure.

On August 1, 2010, the Transportation Safety Board of Canada grounded all of Aeropro air fleet and revoked the airline's operating permit, due to concerns in the carrier's operations, especially regarding aircraft maintenance, raised by the crash of Flight 201 less than two months prior. Aeropro ceased all of its operation the following day. Aeropro appealed against this decision to a federal court in Montreal, but the appeal was rejected on 16 August.

== See also ==
- Sepahan Airlines Flight 5915, also caused by an engine failure and pilot errors
