= La Romaine Airport =

Airport in La Romaine, Quebec, Canada

- IATA: ZGS; ICAO: none; TC LID: CTT5

Summary
- Airport type: Public
- Operator: Ministère des transports et de la mobilité durable
- Location: La Romaine, Quebec
- Time zone: AST (UTC−04:00)
- Elevation AMSL: 93 ft / 28 m
- Coordinates: 50°15′35″N 060°40′26″W

Map
- Location in Quebec

Runways
Direction	Length		Surface
Direction	ft	m	Surface
11/29	3,933	1,199	Asphalt
- Source: Canada Flight Supplement

La Romaine Airport (IATA: ZGS, TC LID: CTT5) is located 2.5 nautical miles (4.6 km; 2.9 mi) north of La Romaine, Quebec, Canada.

== Airlines and destinations ==
Airlines	Destinations
Air Liaison	Blanc-Sablon, Chevery, Natashquan, Saint-Augustin, Sept-Îles
Central Mountain Air	Blanc-Sablon, Chevery, Montréal–Trudeau, Natashquan, Québec City, Saint-Augustin, Sept-Îles
