= Chevery Airport =

Airport in Chevery, Quebec, Canada

- IATA: YHR; ICAO: CYHR; WMO: 71814

Summary
- Airport type: Public
- Operator: Municipalité de Côte-Nord-du-Golfe-du-Saint-Laurent
- Location: Côte-Nord-du-Golfe-du-Saint-Laurent
- Time zone: AST (UTC−04:00)
- Elevation AMSL: 39 ft / 12 m
- Coordinates: 50°28′08″N 059°38′12″W

Map
- Location in Quebec

Runways
| Direction | Length | | Surface |
| Direction | ft | m | Surface |
|---|---|---|---|
| 07/25 | 4,500 | 1,372 | Asphalt |

Statistics (2010)
- Aircraft movements: 3,716
- Source: Canada Flight Supplement; Environment Canada; Movements from Statistics Canada.

Chevery Airport (IATA: YHR, ICAO: CYHR) is located on the north-eastern shore of the Gulf of Saint Lawrence, Quebec, Canada in the municipality of Côte-Nord-du-Golfe-du-Saint-Laurent. It is uncontrolled but has an automated weather observation system (AWOS).

== Airlines and destinations ==
| Airlines | Destinations |
|---|---|
| Air Liaison | Baie-Comeau, Blanc-Sablon, La Romaine, La Tabatière, Montreal–Saint-Hubert, Natashquan, Québec City, Saint-Augustin, Sept-Îles, Tête-à-la-Baleine |
| Central Mountain Air | Blanc-Sablon, La Romaine, Montréal–Trudeau, Natashquan, Québec City, Saint-Augustin, Sept-Îles |
