= ZLT =

ZLT may refer to:

- La Tabatière Airport in La Tabatière, Quebec, Canada (IATA code)
- Zero-length launch a system to launch jet fighters.
- Zeppelin Luftschifftechnik GmbH & Co (see Zeppelin NT)
