= Havre Saint-Pierre Airport =

Havre-Saint-Pierre Airport
- IATA: YGV; ICAO: CYGV; WMO: 71313

Summary
- Airport type: Public
- Owner: Transport Canada
- Operator: OPSIS Services Aéroportuaires
- Location: Havre-Saint-Pierre, Quebec
- Time zone: EST (UTC−05:00)
  - Summer (DST): EDT (UTC−04:00)
- Elevation AMSL: 125 ft / 38 m
- Coordinates: 50°16′55″N 063°36′40″W

Map
- Location in Quebec

Runways
Direction	Length		Surface
Direction	ft	m	Surface
08/26	4,498	1,371	Asphalt

Statistics (2010)
- Aircraft movements: 6,461
- Source: Canada Flight Supplement; Environment and Climate Change Canada; Movements from Statistics Canada

Havre Saint-Pierre Airport (IATA: YGV, ICAO: CYGV) is located 3 nautical miles (5.6 km; 3.5 mi) north of Havre-Saint-Pierre, Quebec, Canada. It serves Labrador, the lower and central North Shore and southern Quebec, including Anticosti Island. The airport plays a crucial strategic role in serving the remote Minganie region of Quebec's North Shore, providing essential air connectivity to communities that would otherwise have limited transportation options due to their geographic isolation along the Gulf of St. Lawrence.

== Airport infrastructure ==
The airport features a single asphalt runway designated 08/26, measuring 4,498 ft × 100 ft (1,371 m × 30 m) and at an elevation of 125 ft (38 m). The runway has pilot-controlled lighting systems, with approach lighting system (ALS) on runway 08 and runway end identifier lights (REIL) on runway 26.

The terminal building was constructed in 1983 and handles both scheduled flights and air charters. The facility operates with limited hours, with the terminal building and administration office open Monday through Friday from 7:30 AM to 4:30 PM.

== Ownership and operations ==
The airport is owned by Transport Canada and operated by Aéropro. As a government-owned facility, it falls under Transport Canada's National Airports Policy as a regional/local airport. The airport is managed by Opsis Services Aeroportuaires Inc. for airport management services.

== Airlines and destinations ==
Air Liaison is the primary airline serving the airport, providing scheduled flights to three destinations in Quebec: Port-Menier, Quebec City, and Sept-Îles.

Airlines	Destinations
Air Liaison	Port-Menier, Quebec City, Sept-Îles

== Communication and navigation ==
- Automatic Weather Observation System (AWOS): 125.95 MHz (English) and 128.3 MHz (French)
- Mandatory Frequency (MF): 122.0 MHz for traffic coordination
- Remote Communications Outlet (RCO): Madeleine Radio on 122.0 MHz

== Related facilities ==
The area also features the Havre Saint-Pierre Water Aerodrome (TC LID: CTE3), located 2 nautical miles (3.7 km; 2.3 mi) east northeast of the town, which provides additional aviation access via seaplane operations.
