= Port-Menier Airport =

- IATA: YPN; ICAO: CYPN; WMO: 71810

Summary
- Airport type: Public
- Operator: Transports Québec
- Location: Port-Menier, Quebec
- Time zone: EST (UTC−05:00)
  - Summer (DST): EDT (UTC−04:00)
- Elevation AMSL: 168 ft / 51 m
- Coordinates: 49°50′11″N 064°17′19″W

Map
- Location in Quebec

Runways
Direction	Length		Surface
Direction	ft	m	Surface
11/29	4,888	1,490	Asphalt

Statistics (2010)
- Aircraft movements: 2,089
- Source: Canada Flight Supplement; Environment Canada; Movements from Statistics Canada

Port-Menier Airport (IATA: YPN, ICAO: CYPN) is located 2.7 nautical miles (5.0 km; 3.1 mi) east of Port-Menier, Quebec, Canada.

The airport has a single small terminal building, and is serviced by a single runway.

== Airlines and destinations ==
Airlines	Destinations
Air Inuit	Seasonal charter: Mont-Joli, Montreal–Trudeau, Québec City
Air Liaison	Havre Saint-Pierre, Québec City, Sept-Îles
Chrono Aviation	Seasonal charter: Mont-Joli
