= CYBC =

CYBC may refer to:

- Cyprus Broadcasting Corporation
- Baie-Comeau Airport, in Quebec, Canada, IATA code CYBC
