= Baie-Comeau Airport =

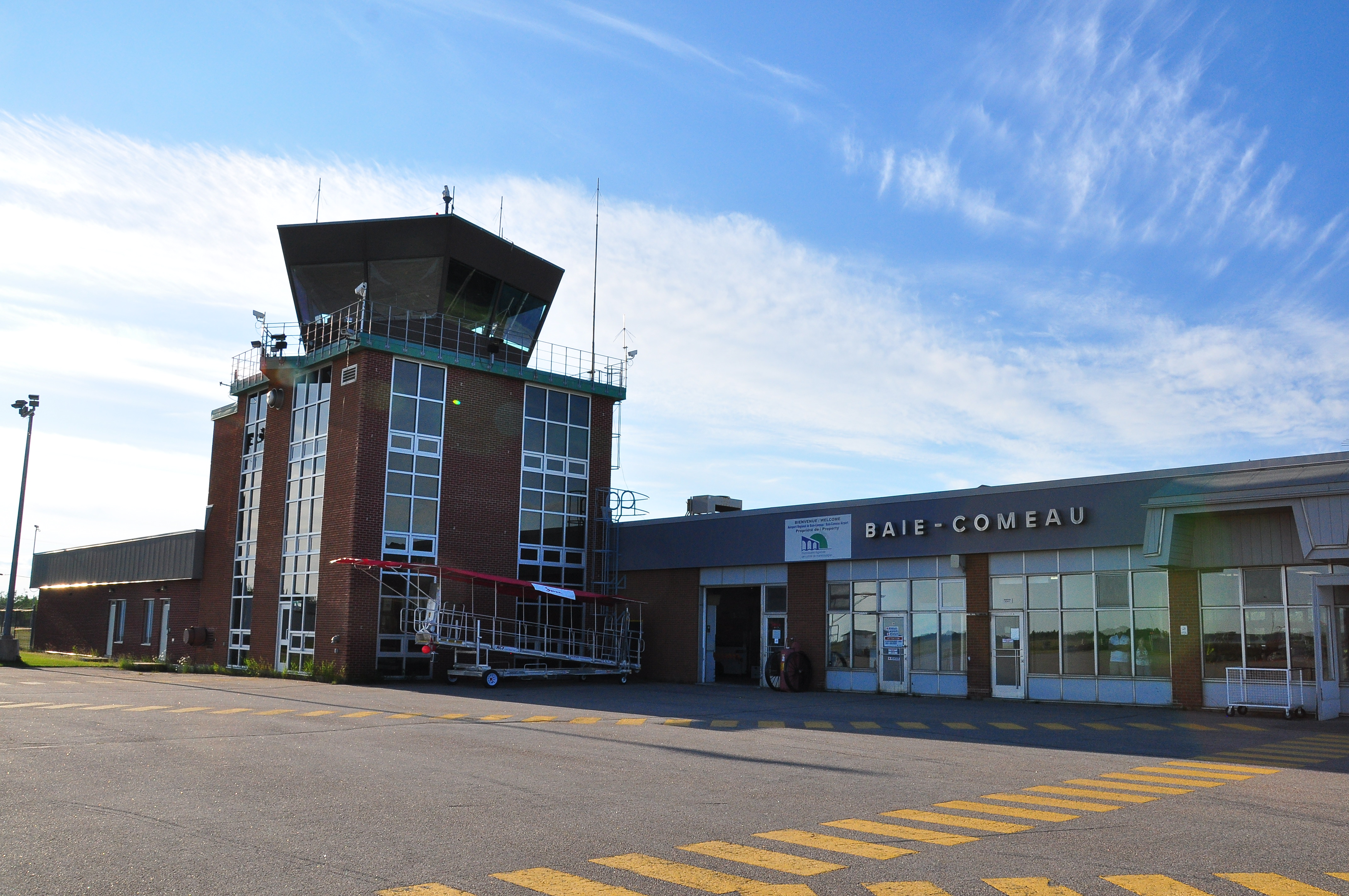
- IATA: YBC; ICAO: CYBC; WMO: 71691

Summary
- Airport type: Public
- Owner/Operator: MRC Manicouagan
- Serves: Baie-Comeau
- Location: Pointe-Lebel, Quebec
- Time zone: EST (UTC−05:00)
  - Summer (DST): EDT (UTC−04:00)
- Elevation AMSL: 71 ft / 22 m
- Coordinates: 49°07′57″N 068°12′16″W

Map

Runways
Direction	Length		Surface
Direction	ft	m	Surface
10/28	6,000	1,829	Asphalt

Statistics (2010)
- Aircraft movements: 8,967
- Source: Canada Flight Supplement and Transport Canada; Environment Canada; Movements from Statistics Canada.

Baie-Comeau Airport (IATA: YBC, ICAO: CYBC) is located 5 nautical miles (9.3 km; 5.8 mi) south southwest of Baie-Comeau, Quebec, near the St. Lawrence River.

== Airlines and destinations ==
Airlines	Destinations
Air Liaison	Chevery, Montréal–Saint-Hubert, Quebec City, Sept-Îles

== See also ==
- Baie-Comeau Water Aerodrome
- Baie-Comeau (Manic 1) Airport
