= Groupe La Québécoise =

Quebec bus transport company

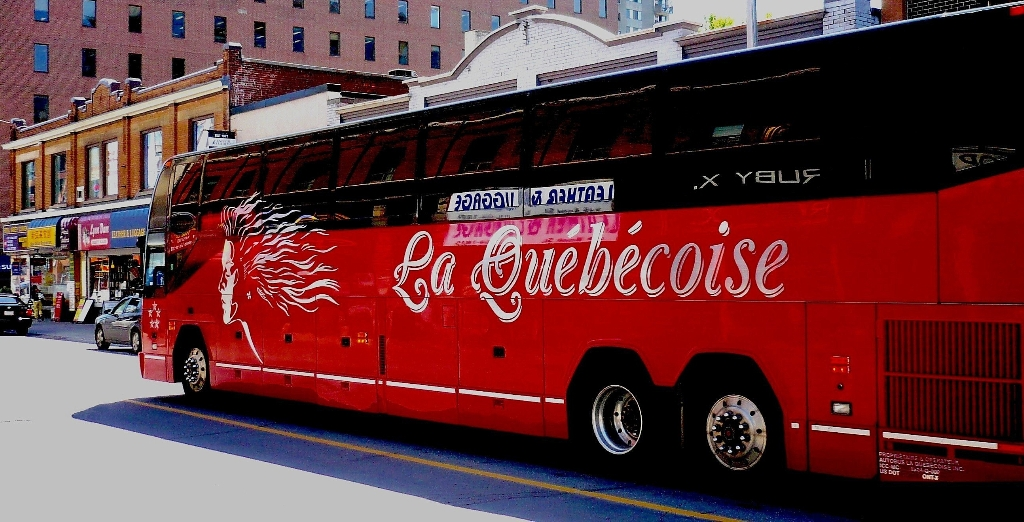
- Founded: 1965
- Headquarters: 5480 rue Rideau, Quebec City
- Service type: Coach, school bus, public transit, paratransit
- Fleet: 512
- Website: Official website

Groupe La Québécoise (French pronunciation: [ɡʁup la kebekwaz]) is a passenger transportation company based in Quebec, Canada. The company started out in 1965 by providing student transportation for school boards in the Quebec City area, and has progressed into providing intercity bus service, public transit, paratransit, airport shuttles and coach charters. Expansion within the province has seen them establish subsidiaries in the regions of Outaouais, Lanaudière, Montérégie, Estrie, Centre-du-Québec, Chaudière-Appalaches, Capitale-Nationale and Gaspésie.

== Bus services ==
La Québécoise offered intercity bus service between Quebec City and Sherbrooke (via Victoriaville) until 2026. Their permit to operate this service was revoked by the Quebec government following a months-long lockout. Service to Sherbrooke from Drummondville and Trois-Rivieres is inactive as of November 2026, due to said lockout.

Public transit systems operated by the company are CIT Le Richelain and CIT Sorel-Varennes, with paratransit services operated for the Société de transport de l'Outaouais. They also provide transportation services for handicapped persons directly to other regional municipalities and cities in the province. School transportation, the foundation of the company, is still a major part of their business.

Groupe La Québécoise operates Prevost Car luxury coaches, including H3-41, H3-45 and VIP models. School transportation is provided using minibuses, standard and modified school buses. Transit buses and handicapped vehicles vary according to differing municipal requirements.

Formerly, Groupe La Québécoise operated l'Aerobus, a coach service that transported passengers between Montréal-Trudeau International Airport and the Central Bus Station in Downtown Montreal. Departures from the airport were at Gate 5, and the bus terminal was located on de Maisonneuve Boulevard at the corner of Berri Street, directly connected to the Berri–UQAM metro station. There was a free shuttle connection from the bus station to select downtown hotels. Since March 29, 2010, the Société de transport de Montréal has operated the airport bus.

== Aviation services ==
Air Liaison is a regional airline based in Quebec City.

Héli Express provides helicopter services in support of mining, forestry, oil, and hydroelectric companies in remote areas of Quebec and northern Canada. They have worked extensively with Hydro-Québec on the James Bay Project.

Skyjet Aviation (Skyjet) is a company that specializes in aircraft charter service, beginning operations from Quebec City in 2007. They acquired Air Mécatina Sept-Iles in 2008 to expand further in the eastern Quebec region.

== Accidents and incidents ==
- On 12 October 2017, for the first time in North America, a drone collided with a passenger plane. The drone struck the turboprop passenger plane operated by Skyjet Aviation while it was on approach to Quebec City's Jean Lesage Airport. The drone was operating above the 90m flight height restriction and within the 5km exclusion zone around airports, violating drone operating regulations.
