= Lourdes-de-Blanc-Sablon Airport =

Airport in Blanc-Sablon, Quebec, Canada

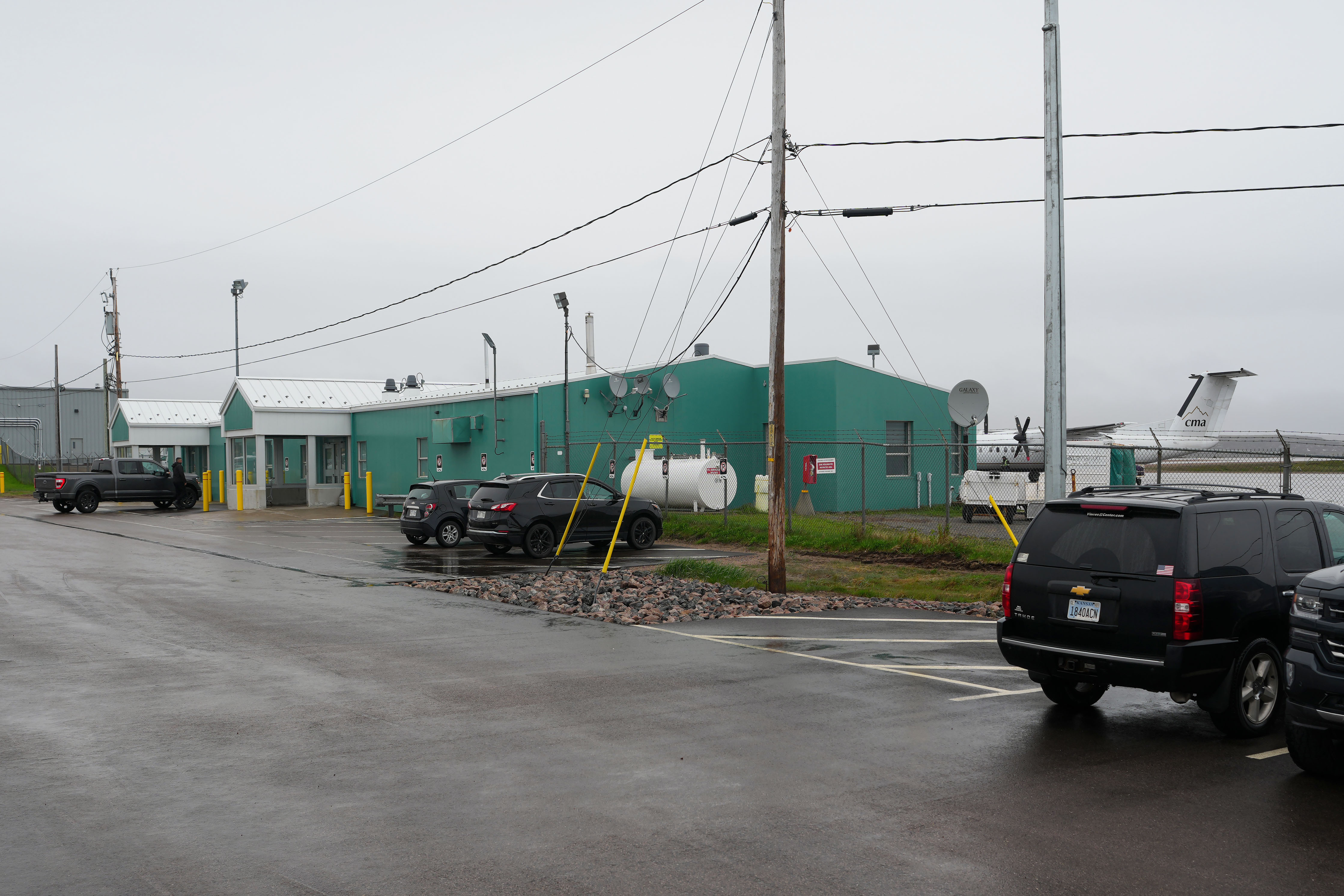
- IATA: YBX; ICAO: CYBX

Summary
- Airport type: Public
- Operator: Transport Canada
- Location: Blanc-Sablon, Quebec
- Time zone: AST (UTC−04:00)
- Elevation AMSL: 122 ft / 37 m
- Coordinates: 51°26′31″N 057°11′10″W

Map
- Location in Quebec

Runways
Direction	Length		Surface
Direction	ft	m	Surface
05/23	4,500	1,372	Asphalt

Statistics (2010)
- Aircraft movements: 5,890
- Source: Canada Flight Supplement; Movements from Statistics Canada.

Lourdes-de-Blanc-Sablon Airport (IATA: YBX, ICAO: CYBX) is located 2 nautical miles (3.7 km; 2.3 mi) north of Blanc-Sablon, Le Golfe-du-Saint-Laurent Regional County Municipality, in administrative region of Côte-Nord, Quebec, Canada.

== Airlines and destinations ==
Airlines	Destinations
Air Liaison	Chevery, La Romaine, Natashquan, Quebec City, Saint-Augustin, Sept-Îles, Montréal-Saint-Hubert
Central Mountain Air	Chevery, La Romaine, Montréal–Trudeau, Natashquan, Québec City, Saint-Augustin, Sept-Îles
PAL Airlines	Goose Bay, St. Anthony, St. John's

== See also ==
- Côte-Nord (North-Shore), administrative region
- Le Golfe-du-Saint-Laurent Regional County Municipality
- Strait of Belle Isle
- Blanc-Sablon
- Blanc-Sablon Bay
