= Natashquan Airport =

Airport in Natashquan, Quebec, Canada

- IATA: YNA; ICAO: CYNA; WMO: 71513

Summary
- Airport type: Public
- Operator: Municipalité du Canton de Natashquan
- Location: Natashquan, Quebec
- Time zone: EST (UTC−05:00)
  - Summer (DST): EDT (UTC−04:00)
- Elevation AMSL: 39 ft (12 m)
- Coordinates: 50°11′24″N 061°47′20″W

Map
- Location in Quebec

Runways
Direction	Length		Surface
Direction	ft	m	Surface
14/32	4,495	1,370	Asphalt

Statistics (2010)
- Aircraft movements: 3,108
- Source: Canada Flight Supplement; Environment Canada; Movements from Statistics Canada

Natashquan Airport (IATA: YNA, ICAO: CYNA) is located adjacent to Natashquan, Quebec, Canada.

== Airlines and destinations ==
Airlines	Destinations
Air Liaison	Blanc-Sablon, Chevery, La Romaine, Saint-Augustin, Sept-Îles
Central Mountain Air	La Romaine, Sept-Îles
