= Tête-à-la-Baleine Airport =

- IATA: ZTB; ICAO: none; TC LID: CTB6

Summary
- Airport type: Public
- Operator: Transports Québec
- Location: Tête-à-la-Baleine, Quebec
- Time zone: AST (UTC−04:00)
- Elevation AMSL: 112 ft / 34 m
- Coordinates: 50°40′28″N 059°23′01″W

Map
- Location in Quebec

Runways
Direction	Length		Surface
Direction	ft	m	Surface
18/36	1,640	500	Gravel
- Source: Canada Flight Supplement

Tête-à-la-Baleine Airport (IATA: ZTB, TC LID: CTB6) is located 2.5 nautical miles (4.6 km; 2.9 mi) southwest of Tête-à-la-Baleine, Quebec, Canada.

== Airlines and destinations ==
Airlines	Destinations
Air Liaison	Chevery, La Tabatière, Saint-Augustin
