= Saint-Augustin Airport =

Airport in Saint-Augustin, Quebec, Canada

- IATA: YIF; ICAO: CYIF

Summary
- Airport type: Public
- Operator: Transports Québec
- Location: Saint-Augustin, Côte-Nord, Quebec
- Time zone: AST (UTC−04:00)
- Elevation AMSL: 19 ft (5.8 m)
- Coordinates: 51°12′36″N 058°39′27″W

Map
- Location in Quebec CYIF (Canada)

Runways
Direction	Length		Surface
Direction	ft	m	Surface
01/19	4,595	1,401	Asphalt

Statistics (2010)
- Aircraft movements: 1,469
- Source: Canada Flight Supplement; Movements from Statistics Canada

Saint-Augustin Airport (IATA: YIF, ICAO: CYIF) is located on the shore of the Saint-Augustin River near Saint-Augustin and Pakuashipi, Quebec, Canada.

== Airlines and destinations ==
Airlines	Destinations
Air Liaison	Blanc Sablon, Chevery, La Romaine, Natashquan, Québec City, Sept-Îles
Central Mountain Air	Blanc-Sablon, Chevery, La Romaine, Natashquan, Québec City, Montréal–Trudeau, Sept-Îles
