= La Tabatière Airport =

Airport in La Tabatière, Quebec, Canada

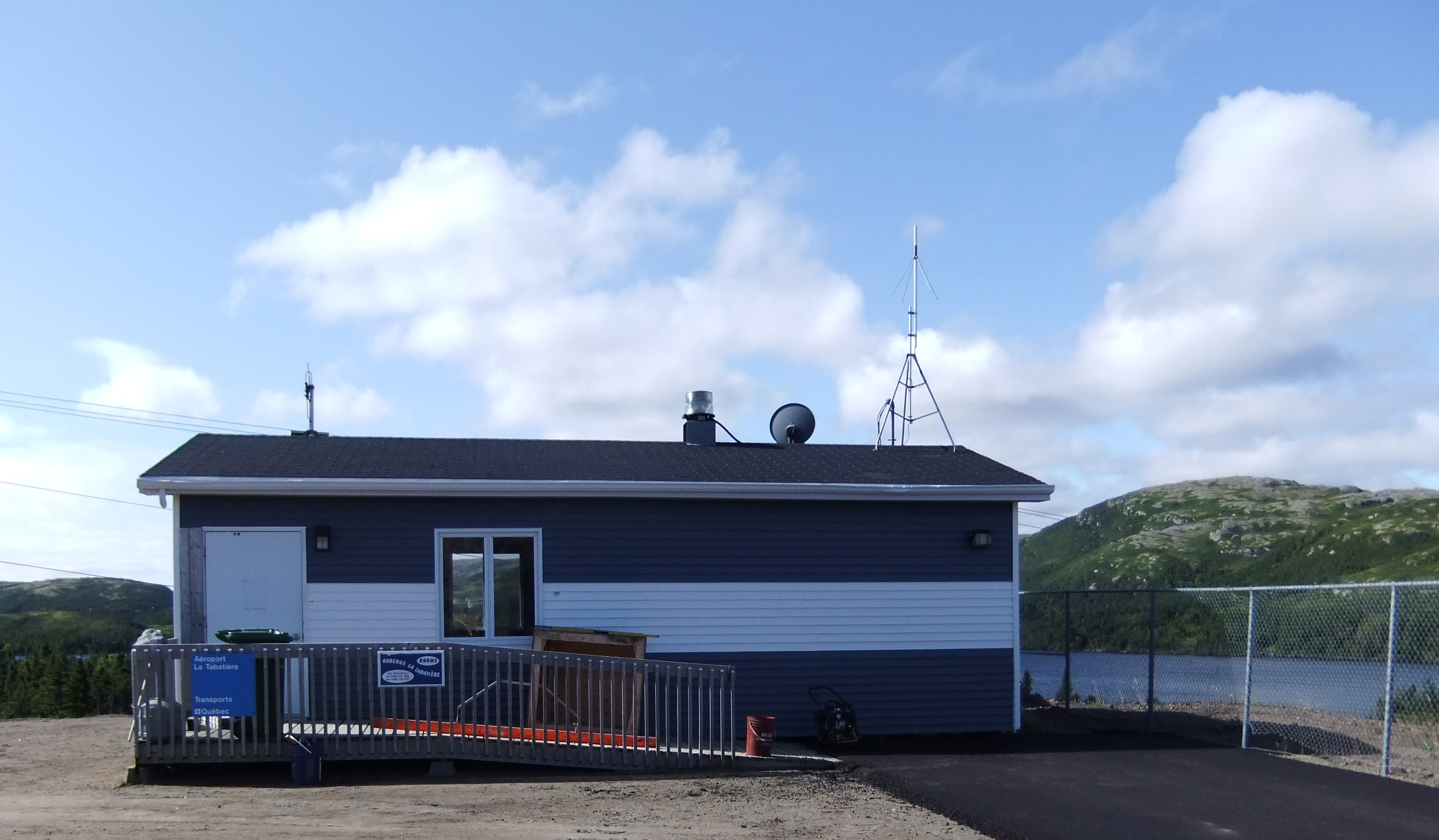
- IATA: ZLT; ICAO: none; TC LID: CTU5

Summary
- Airport type: Public
- Operator: Ministère des transports et de la mobilité durable
- Location: La Tabatière, Quebec
- Time zone: AST (UTC−04:00)
- Elevation AMSL: 102 ft / 31 m
- Coordinates: 50°49′51″N 058°58′32″W

Map
- Location in Quebec

Runways
Direction	Length		Surface
Direction	ft	m	Surface
06/24	1,640	500	Gravel
- Source: Canada Flight Supplement

La Tabatière Airport (IATA: ZLT, TC LID: CTU5) is an airport at La Tabatière, Quebec, Canada.

== Airlines and destinations ==
Airlines	Destinations
Air Liaison	Chevery, Saint-Augustin, Tête-à-la-Baleine
