= Natashquan =

- Municipality
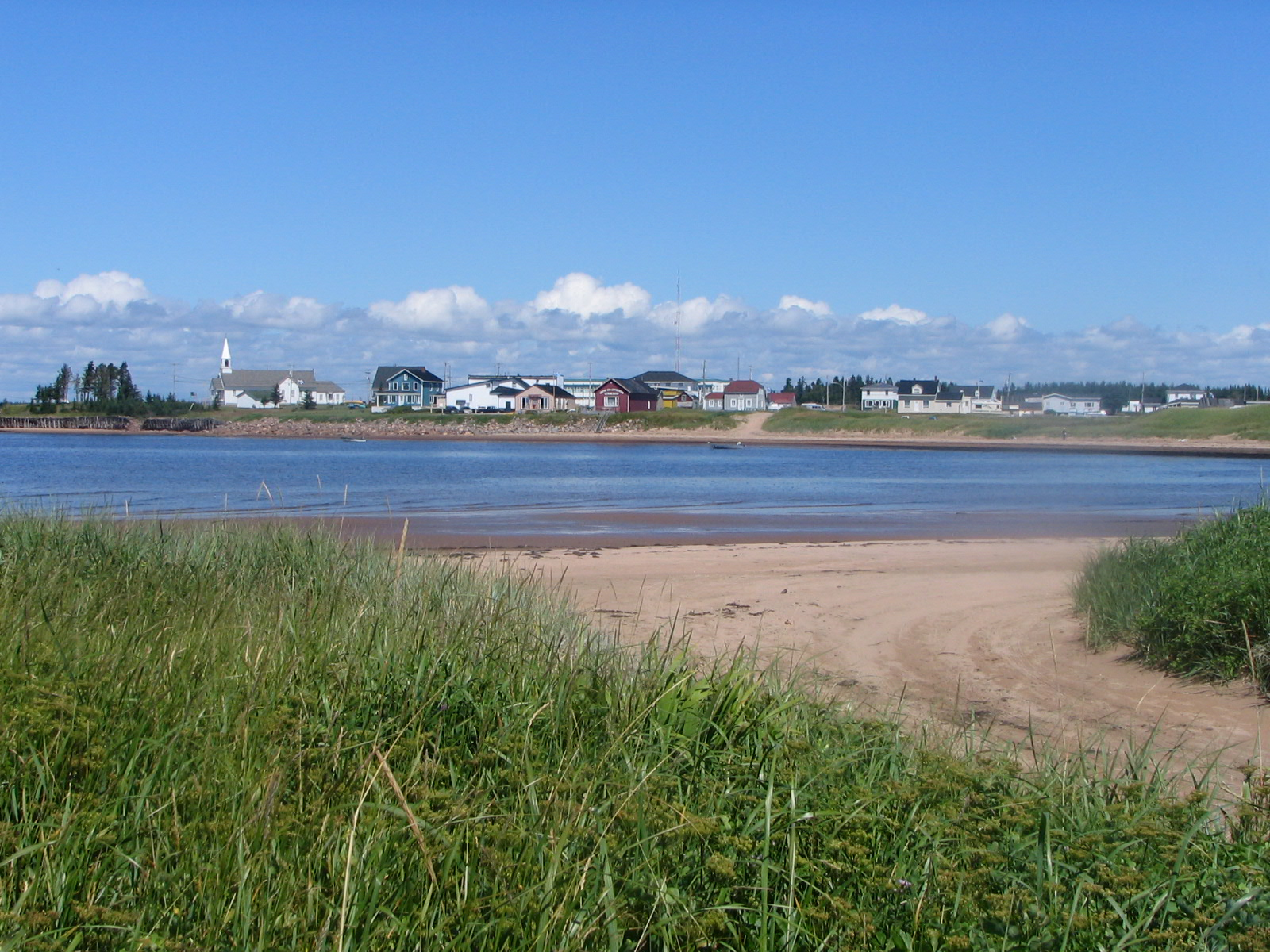
- Little Natashquan River, built heritage near Notre-Dame de Natashquan Mission

- Location in Côte-Nord region of Quebec
- Coordinates: 50°11′N 61°49′W
- Country: Canada
- Province: Quebec
- Region: Côte-Nord
- RCM: Minganie
- Settled: 1855
- Constituted: September 16, 1907

Government
  - Mayor: Henri Wapistan
  - Federal riding: Côte-Nord—Kawawachikamach—Nitassinan
  - Prov. riding: Duplessis

Area
  - Total: 695.43 km^{2} (268.51 sq mi)
  - Land: 667.91 km^{2} (257.88 sq mi)
- Elevation: 10.7 m (35 ft)

Population (2021)
  - Total: 262
  - Density: 0.4/km^{2} (1.0/sq mi)
  - Pop 2016–2021: ▼0.4%
  - Dwellings: 156
- Time zone: UTC−05:00 (Within the AST legislated time zone boundary but observes EST)
  - Summer (DST): UTC−04:00 (EDT)
- Postal code(s): G0G 2E0
- Area codes: 418 and 581
- Highways: R-138
- Website: www.natashquan.org

Natashquan is a municipality located on the north shore of Jacques Cartier Strait, on the Gulf of St. Lawrence, in the Côte-Nord region, Minganie RCM, Quebec, Canada.

Natashquan stretches along the coast, on both sides of the Little Natashquan River, about 120 km east of Havre-Saint-Pierre, near Aguanish and the Natashkuan Indian reserve.

== Pointe-Parent ==
In addition to the village of Natashquan itself, the municipality also includes the hamlet of Pointe-Parent located on the Natashquan River shore, directly adjacent to the Natashquan Reserve.

The hamlet of Pointe-Parent, once also known as Pointe-du-Poste or Village-du-Poste, name Matshiteu by the Innu, which means “the point of land”, is located near the Natashkuan Indian reserve, in the municipality of Natashquan.

It is home to some fishermen's homes and was served by a post office from 1953 to 1976. Pointe-Parent was named after priest Pierre-Clément Parent (1733–1784) who served as missionary in Tadoussac and Labrador and died in Natashquan.

On the Lower-Côte-Nord Shore, except opposite the large Natashquan delta and in the bottom of the bays, the coastline is rocky. At this place, the cliffs are scattered and we find rather large arms of the sea and a multitude of islands and reefs, testifying to a submerged terrain. The natural province is entirely included in the Grenville geological province.

- Pointe-Parent: 50°07′49″N 61°48′02″W

== Notre-Dame-de-Natashquan Mission ==
Between 1855 and 1860, the pioneers of Natashquan lived without a parish organization, the construction of the church began in July 1859, the pioneer families participated in cutting the necessary wood inland from the great Natashquan River. The Notre-Dame-de-Natashquan Mission was founded on the west bank of the Little Natashquan River.

The same year, 1859, the Flora, a three-masted ship 126 feet long, weighing 43 tons, built in Quebec by Narcisse Rosa, ran aground on the banks of Natashquan, it was so silted up that it was impossible to refloat it. However, the pioneers of Natashquan managed to remove pieces of wood to build their houses, but above all, their new church.

In September 1860, the American sailing ship Moses Taylor, weighing 6,000 tons, loaded with wood, arriving from Liverpool was shipwreck in Natashquan while heading towards Quebec. The misfortune of some making the happiness of others, the pioneers of Natashquan, once again, retired from this shipwreck a significant quantity of wood which they used in the construction of Our Lady of the Immaculate Conception Church or Notre-dame de Natashquan Mission.

Natashquan Built heritage

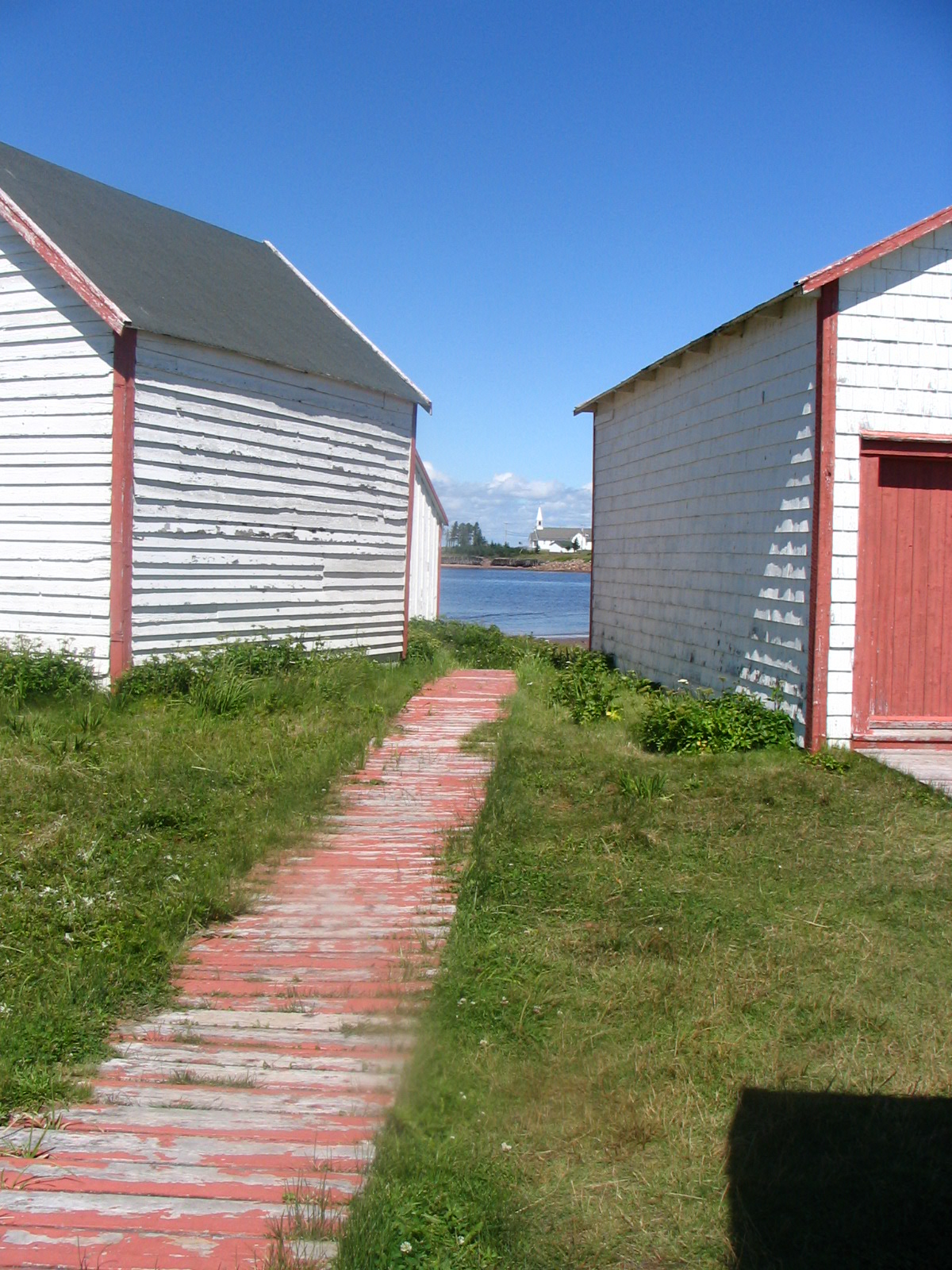
The church view from the wooden sidewalk and stores of the patrimonial site, on the sea shore

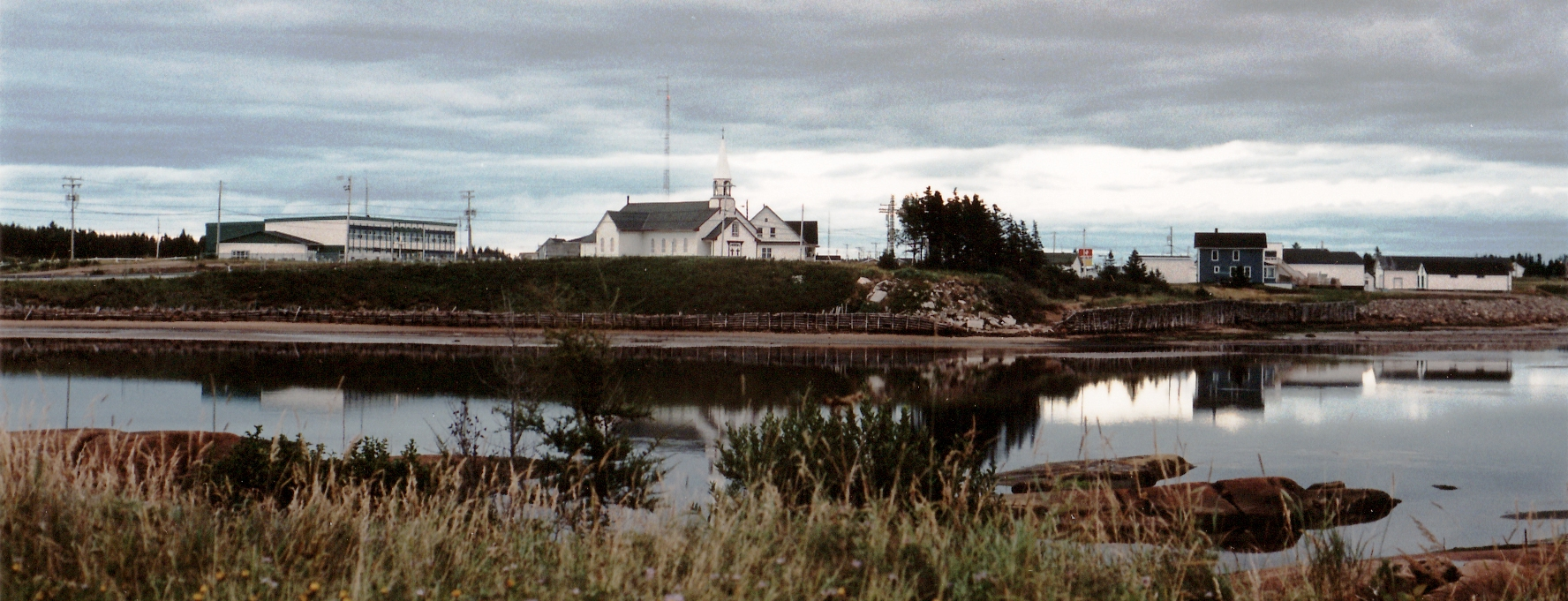
Little Natashquan River, the Roman Catholic church of Our Lady of the Immaculate Conception Church or Notre-Dame de Natashquan Mission

== History ==
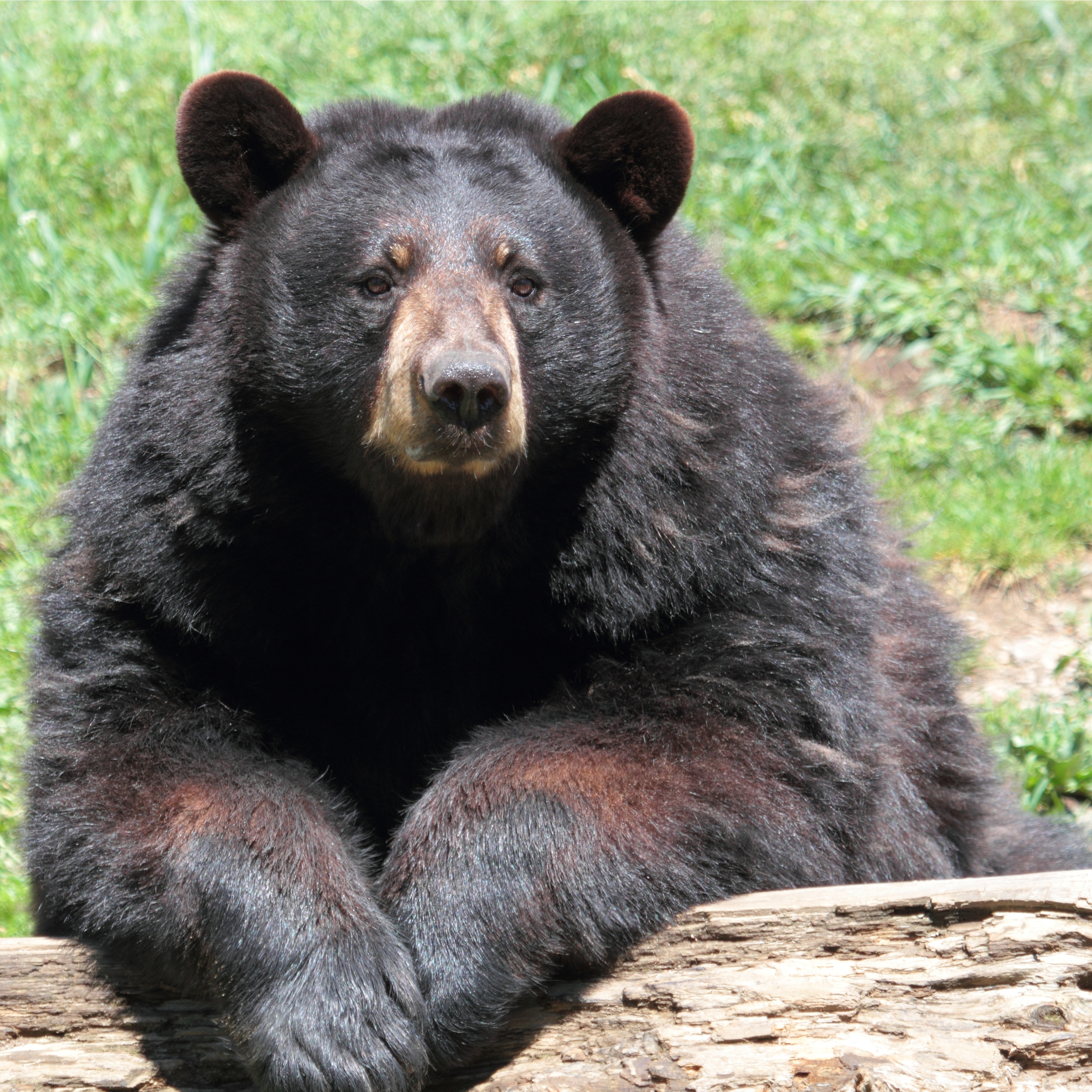
Ursus americanus. - Ours noir. - (American Black Bear)

Natashquan is an Innu name generally translated as "where we caught the Black bear" or as "he hunts the bear". In 1684, the explorer Louis Jolliet spelled other spellings appearing with time. Noutascoüan, Nontascouanne, Natasquan, Nataskwan, Natashkwan, Natosquan, Nataskouan.

A trading post already existed in 1710 at the mouth of the Natashquan River, the settlement of Natashquan in the eponymous township was not founded until 1855 when the first settlers arrived. They were Acadians from the Magdalen Islands, particularly Île du Havre Aubert (in English Amherst Island), Île du Cap aux Meules (in English Grindstone).

In 1855, the name Notre-Dame-de-Natashquan was given to the mission founded on the west bank of the Little Natashquan River. In 1869, Natashquan became the name of a township on the North Shore, in 1907, the name was transferred to the township municipality established in 1907.

The post office opened in August 1872.

In 1958, the first electricity cooperative was formed and electricity was finally installed in homes. Television followed in the 1970s.

On June 18, 2016, Natashquan changed status from township municipality to a (regular) municipality. The new term was made official by the Commission de toponymie du Québec.

== Les Galets historic site ==
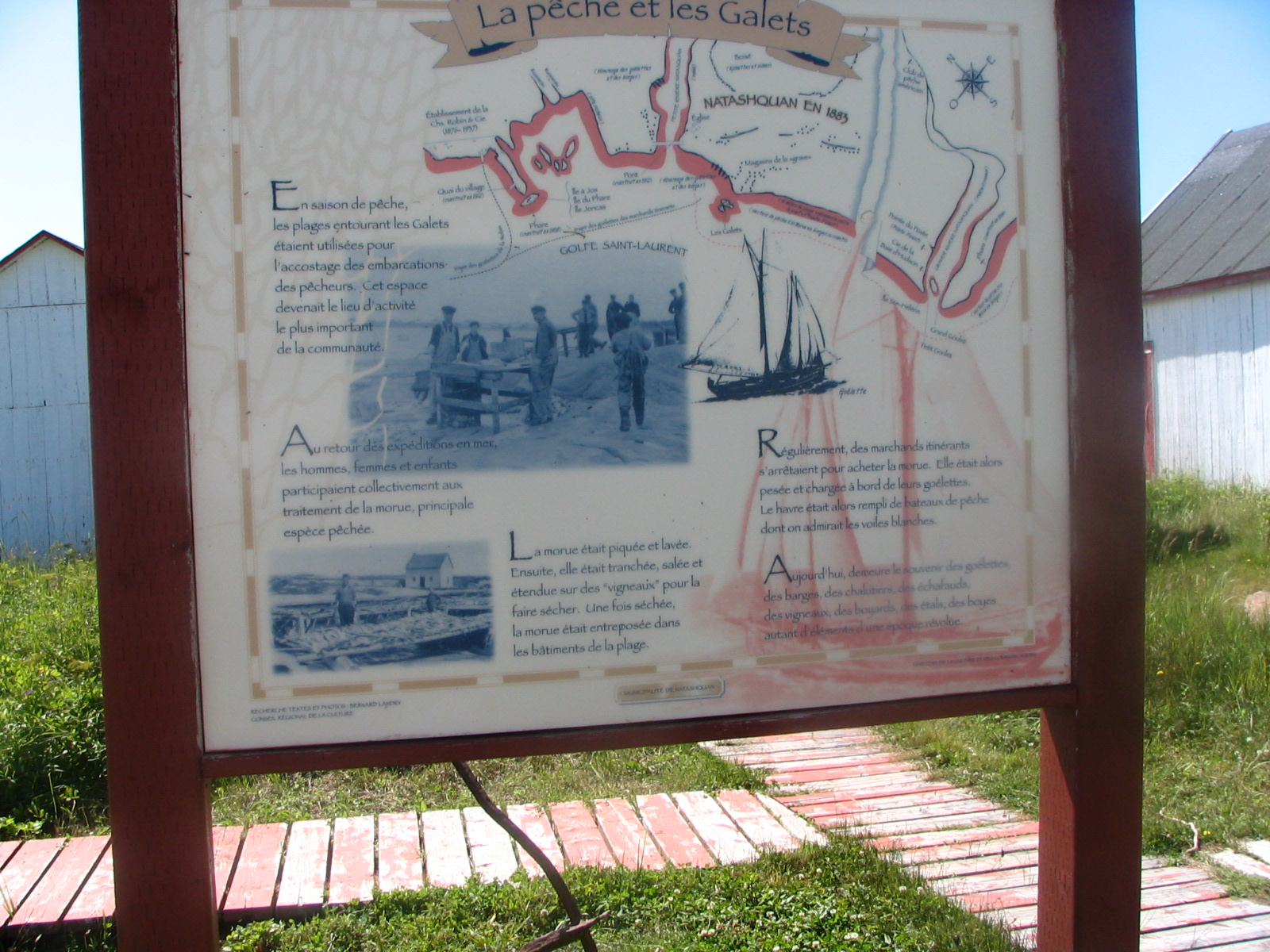
Info panel: in fishing season, fishermen, fish and boats

Located along the Gulf of St. Lawrence, northwest of the Little Natashquan River, classified in 2006, the Galets historic site is a place formerly devoted to fishing activities.

The site, approximately one hundred square meters, is built on a rocky peninsula which rises three meters above the sea. In the 1880s, there were 23 stores or shingles, there were 30 at the beginning of the 20th century, in 2024, twelve small buildings remain, some of which are 150 years old.

From the start of settlement in 1855 until 1937, the height of fishing, the place was mainly exploited by local and independent fishermen and sometimes, itinerant merchants and a few fishing companies.

Red and white, clinging to their rocky bases, the 12 remaining Natashquan Pebbles bear witness to a past of abundant fishing for cod, salmon, herring and even seal hunting in the spring.“Les Galets is our Eiffel Tower! » says Bernard Landry, a native of Natashquan.

Bernard Landry is the initiator of the village collective with the collaboration of 217 people dedicated a book: «Laissez-nous vous raconter», a volume of more than 1,000 pages, published by the Historical Society of the North Shore, April 2023.

Les Galets historic site on the sea shore

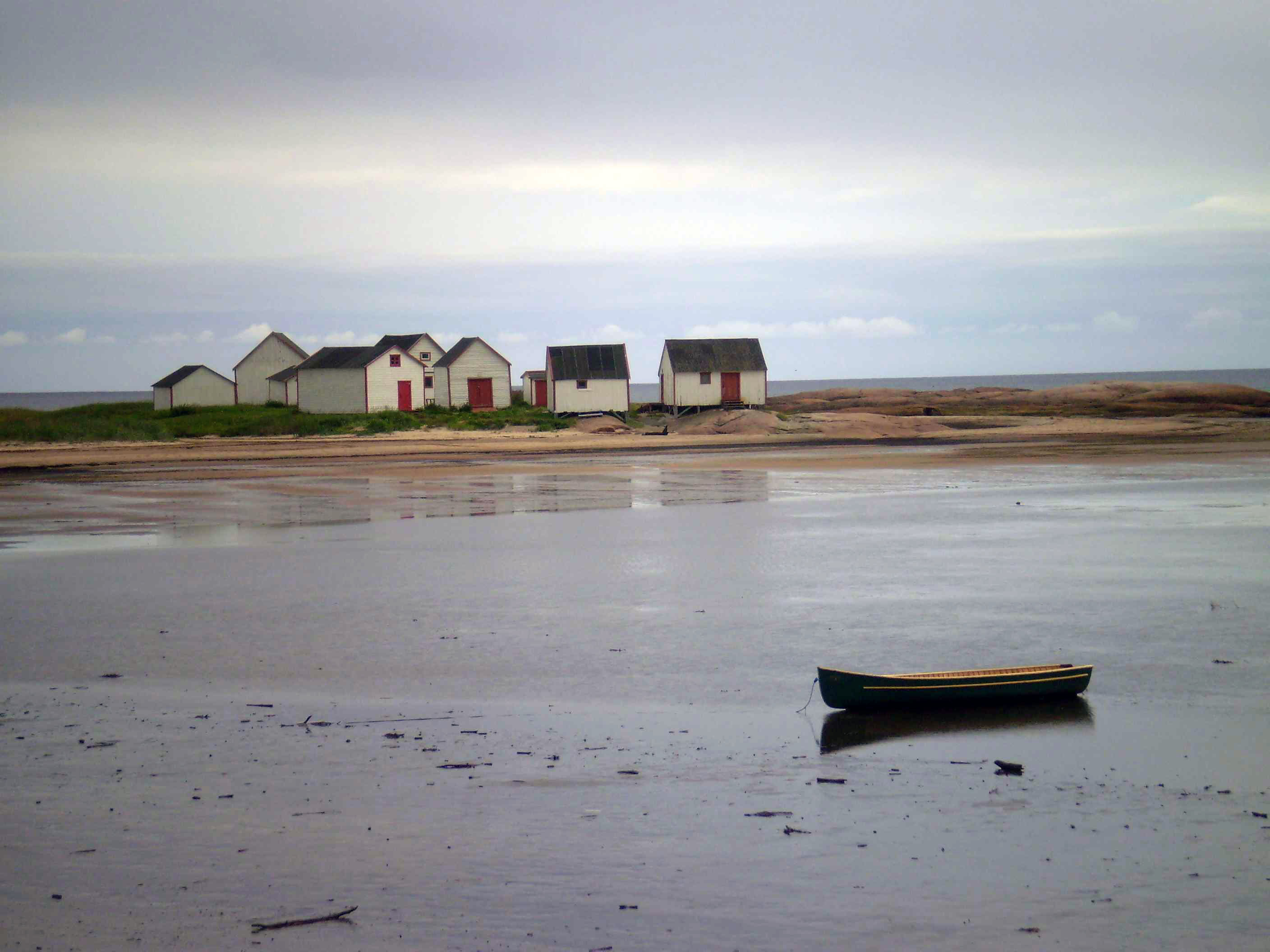
Original fishermen huts (magasins du Galet), Little Natasquan River

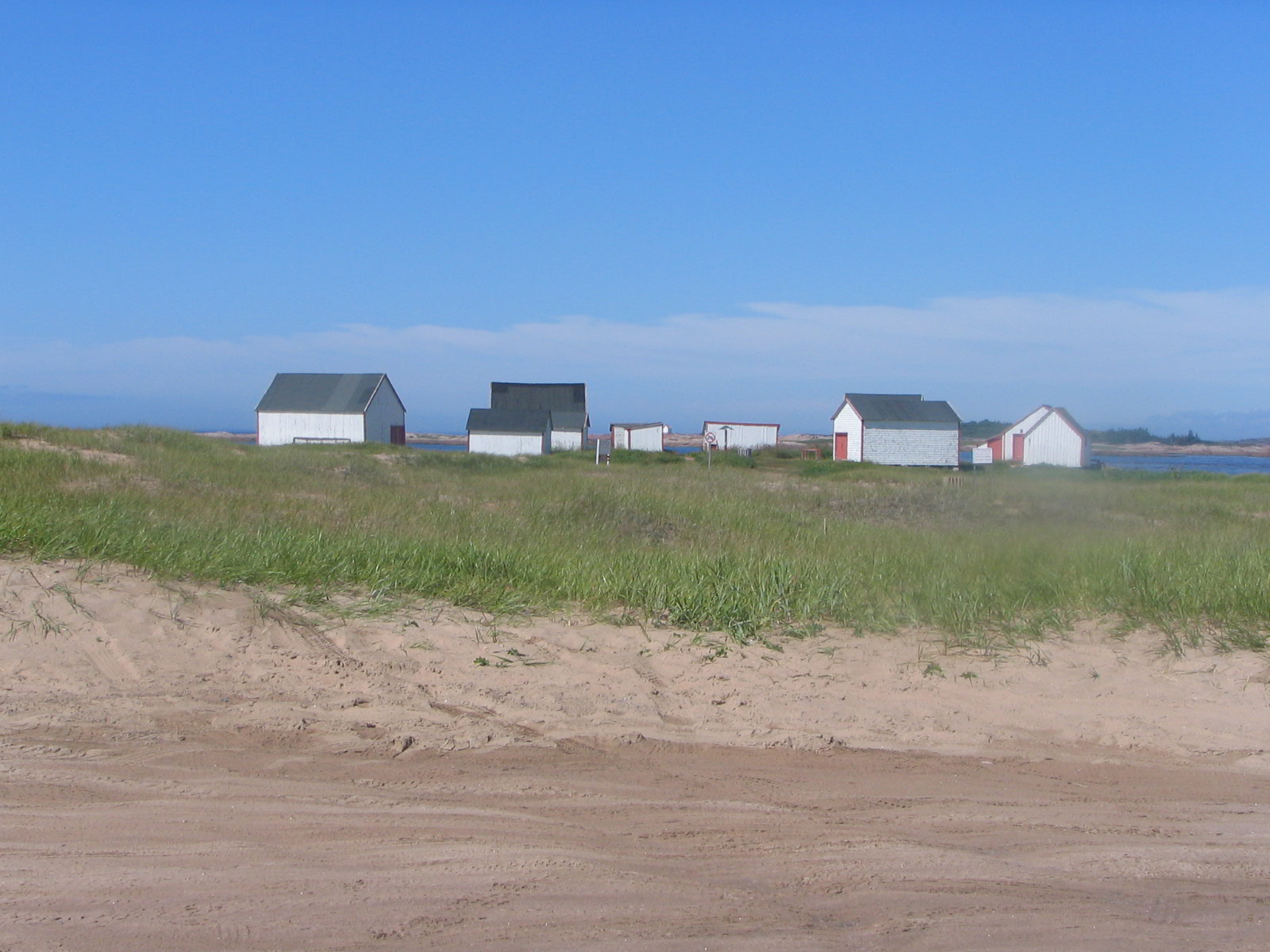

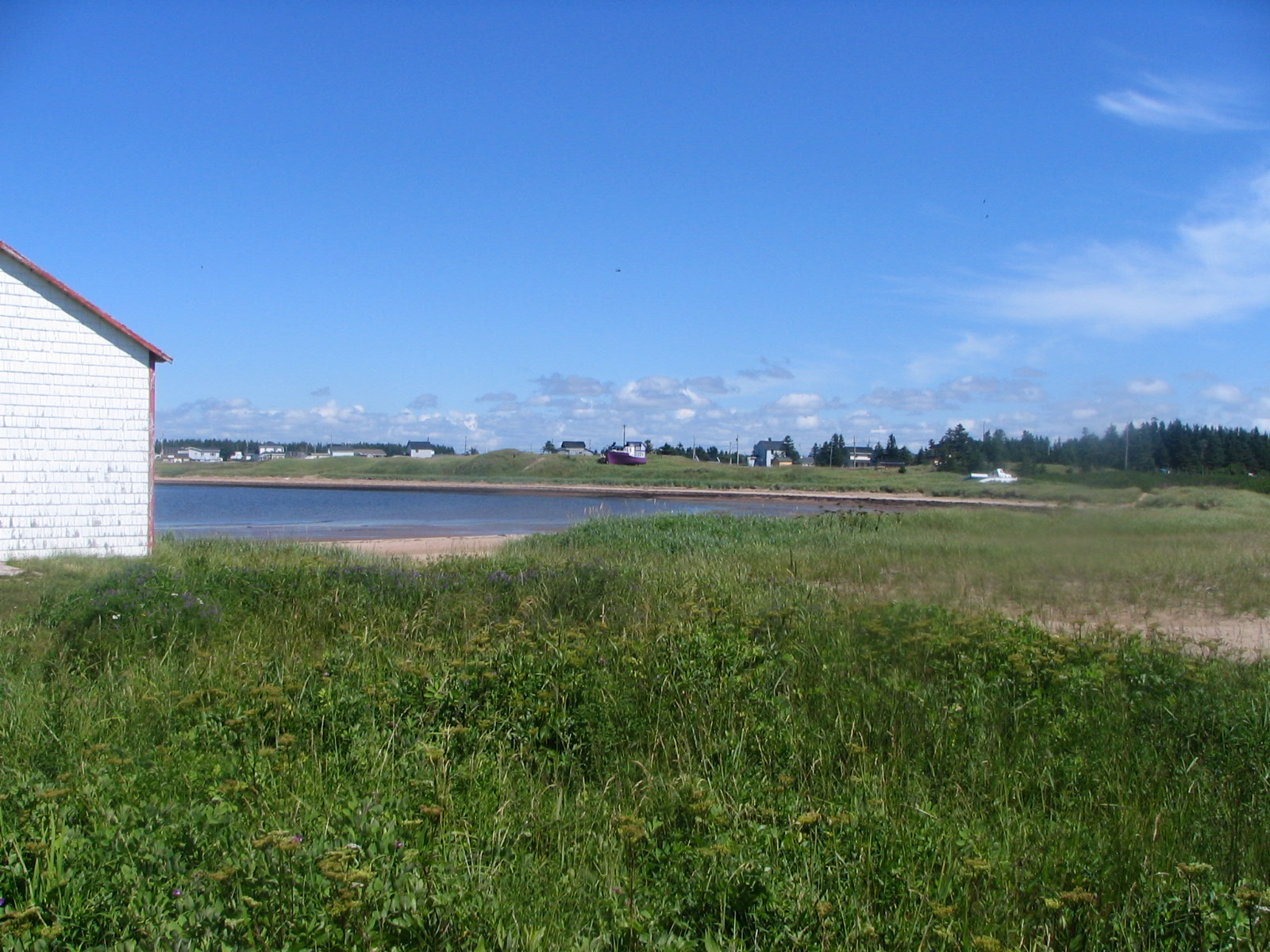

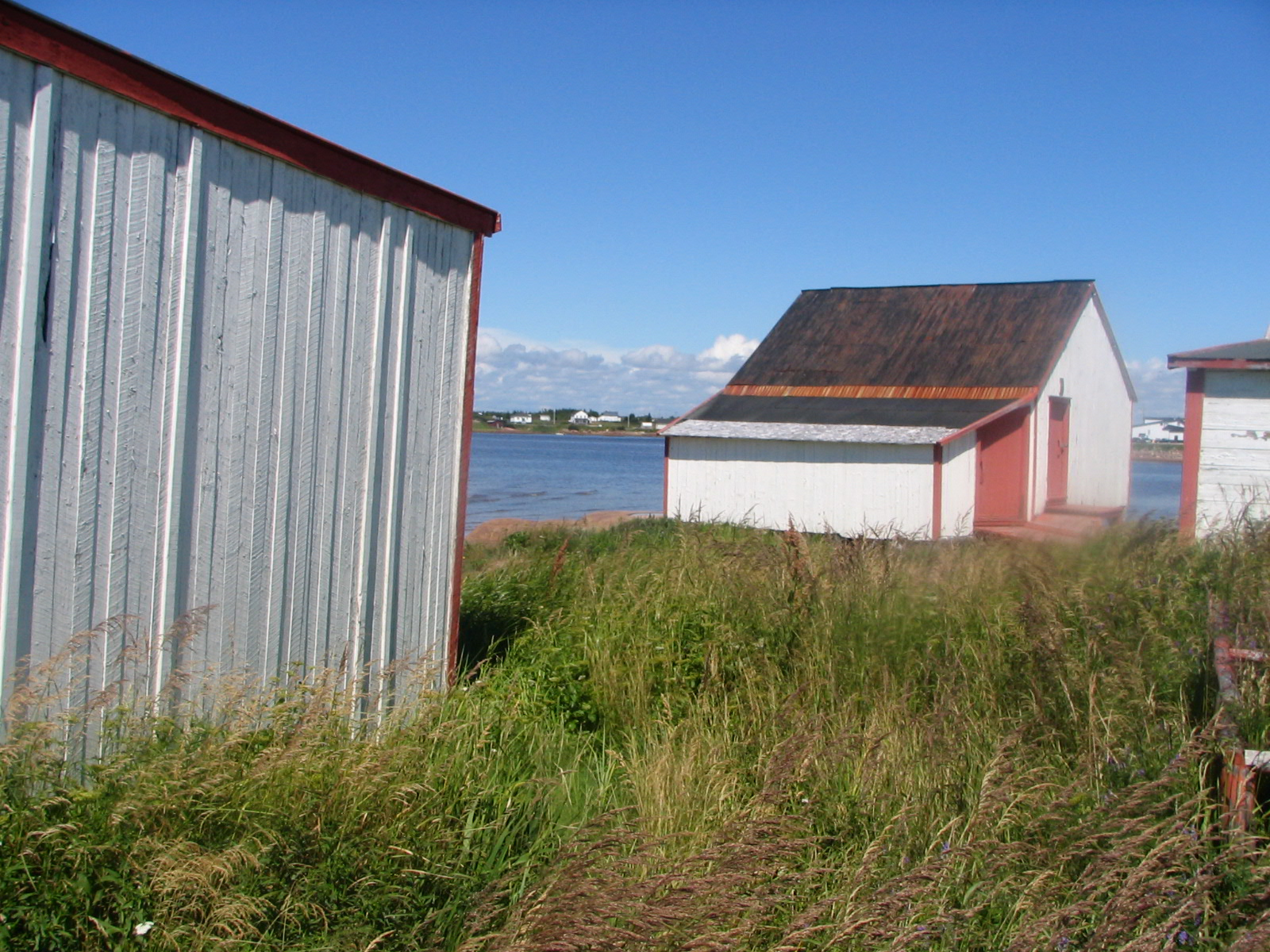

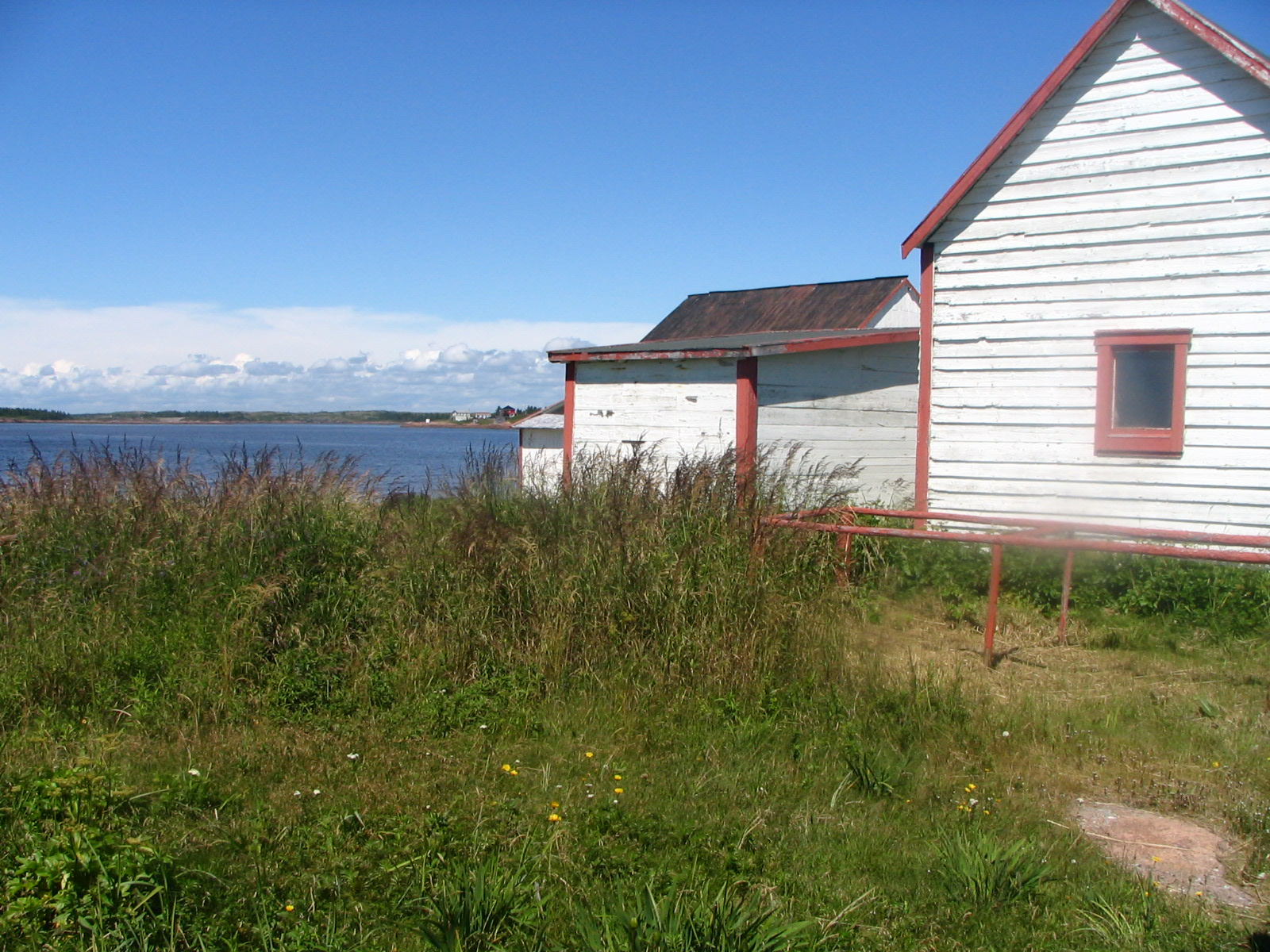

== Transportation ==
=== Route 138 ===
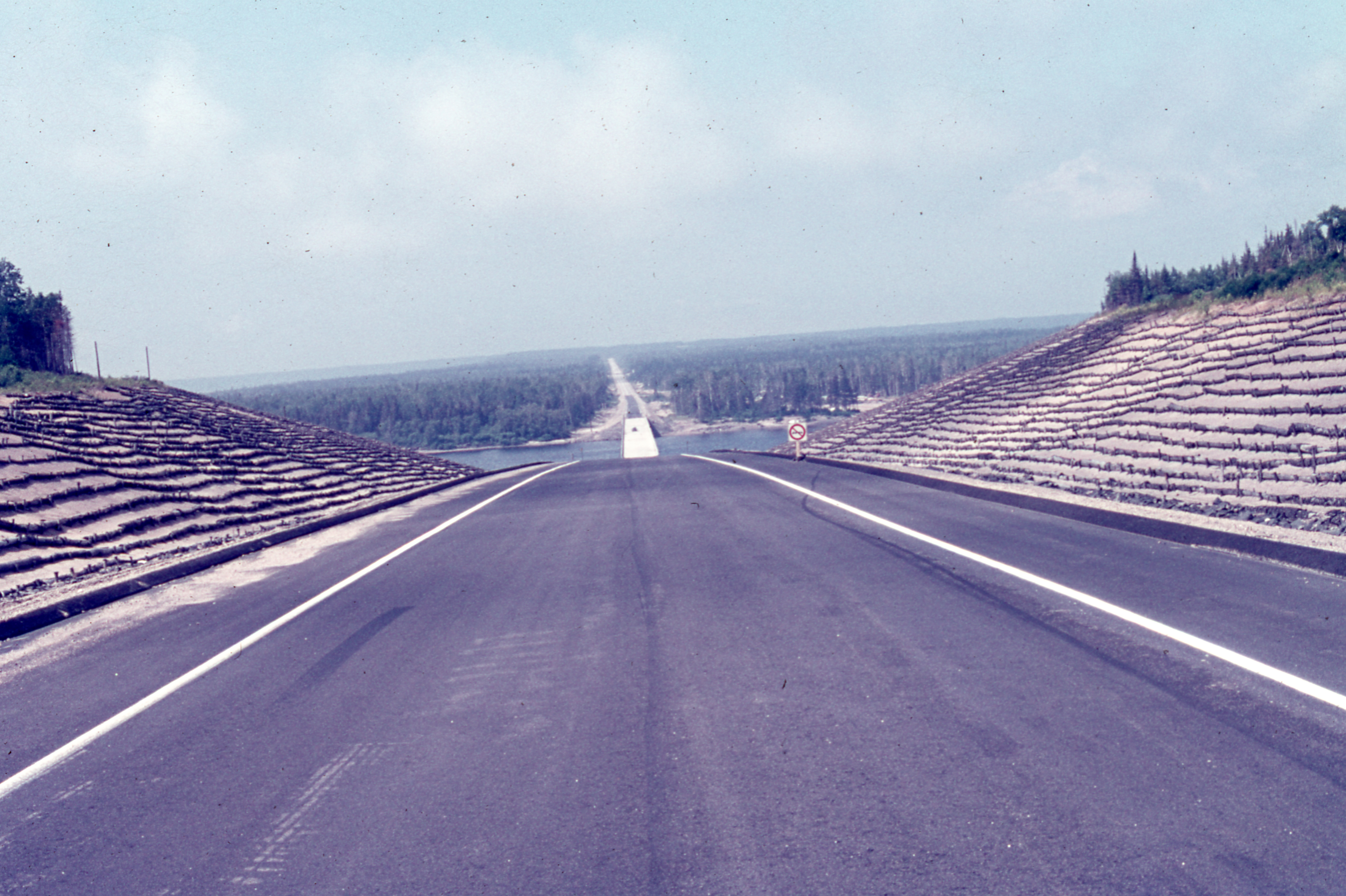
Route 138 East, Donald Gallienne Bridge over the Moisie River, from the hamlet of Matamec, towards Moisie

At the beginning of the 20th century, the first routes of what would become Route 138 (formerly Route 15) were laid in the vicinity of Sept-Îles. In 1961, a section was added from the Franquelin region to the tip of the Moisie River, some 20 kilometres east of Sept-Îles.

On the north shore of the Gulf of St. Lawrence, until 1976, there was no continuous route to go further east than the Moisie River. Only bits of paths connect a few coastal villages to each other, Natashquan connects to Aguanish by a dirt road (1959).

Before 1996, it was only accessible via boat or airplane. That year, Route 138 was extended to Natashquan, connecting it to Havre-Saint-Pierre and ending its isolation from Quebec's road network.

Natashquan Airport and Natashquan (Lac de l'Avion) Water Aerodrome also served the community.

== Port of Natashquan ==
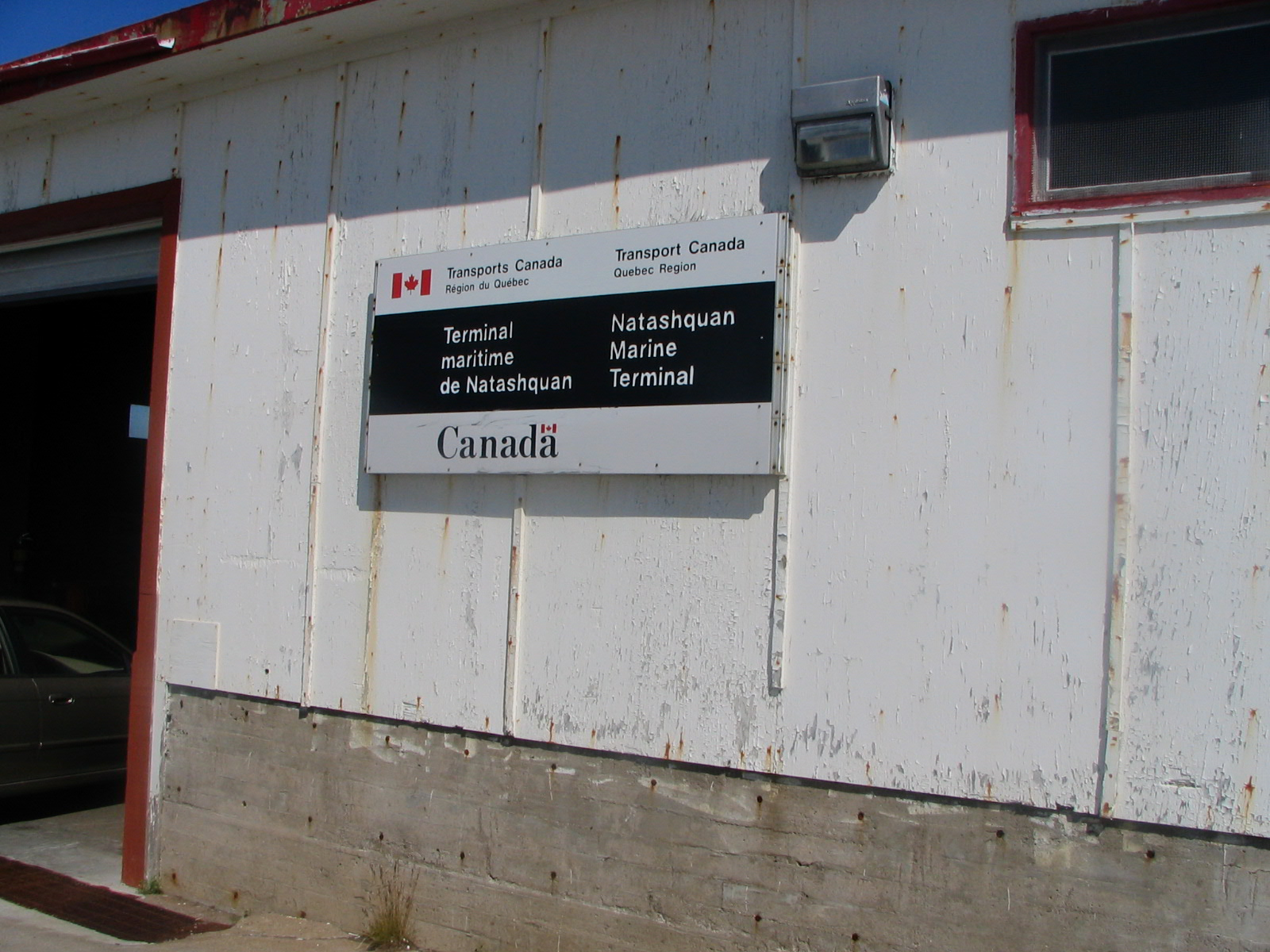
Natashquan marine Terminal, Transport Canada pannel, Quebec region Côte-Nord

Property of Transport Canada, the port of Natashquan is used by the cargo ship M/V Bella Desgagnés, a boat of the company Nordik Express, for the weekly supply of general merchandise to the local population and by a fishing fleet during the season, in Anticosti Island, Côte-Nord and Bas-St-Laurent regions.

Access by the sea

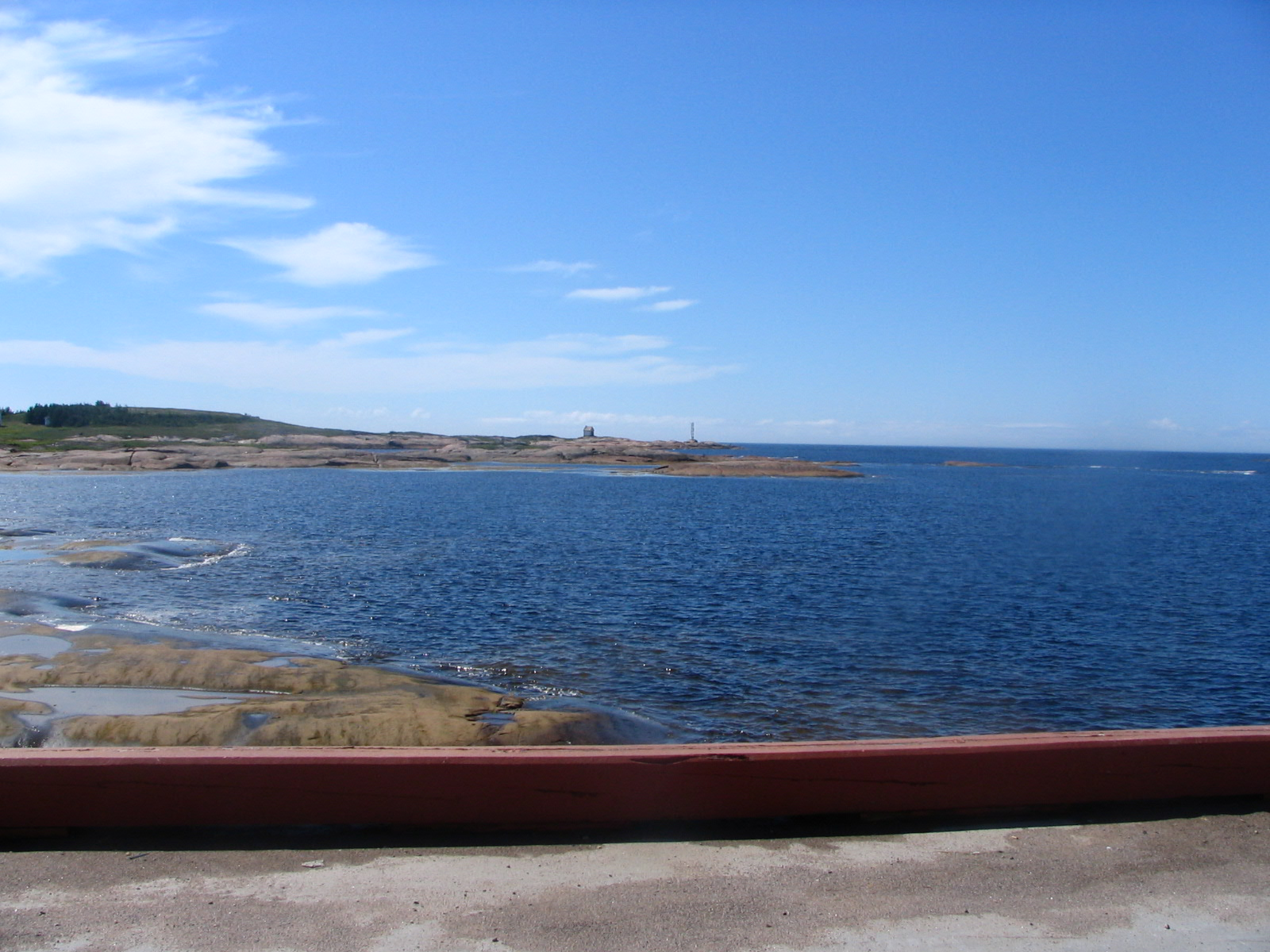
Jacques Cartier Strait, in the Gulf of St. Lawrence, outcropping rocks of the Canadian Shield

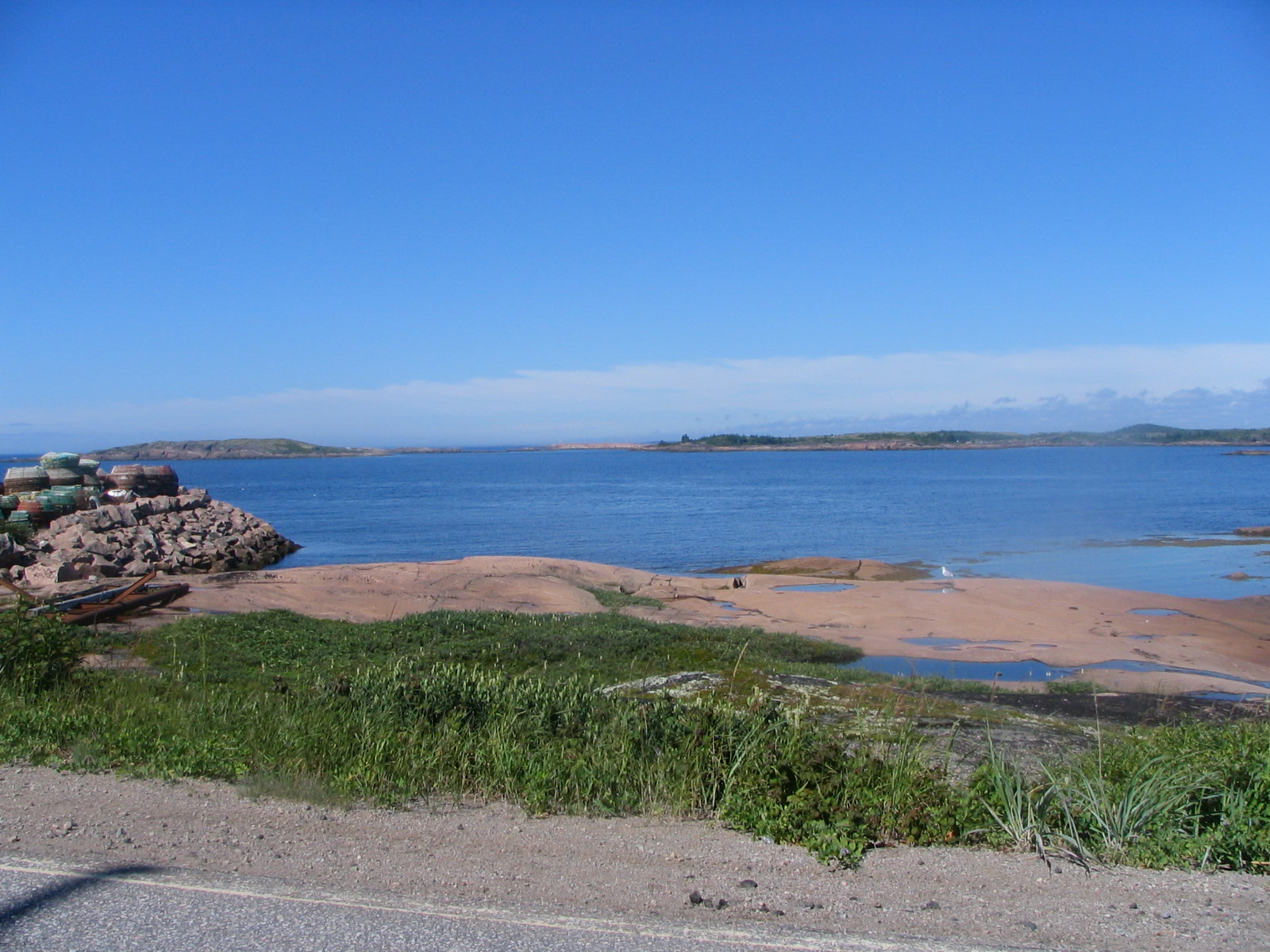
Jacques Cartier Strait, in the Gulf of St. Lawrence, traps for crab fishing on the outcropping rocks of the Canadian Shield

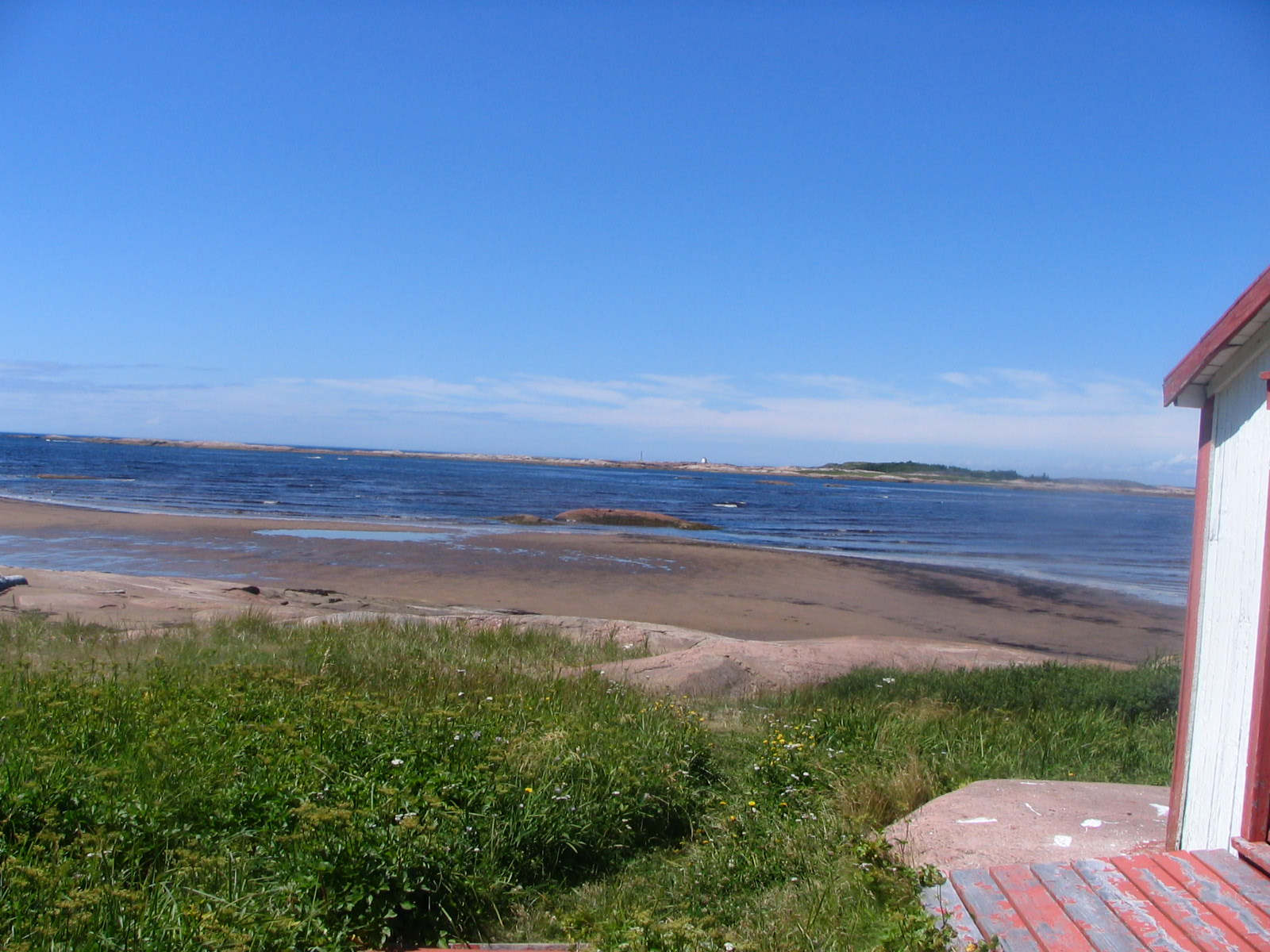
Gulf of St. Lawrence, mouth of the Little Natashquan River, offshore, the Joncas Island lighthouse

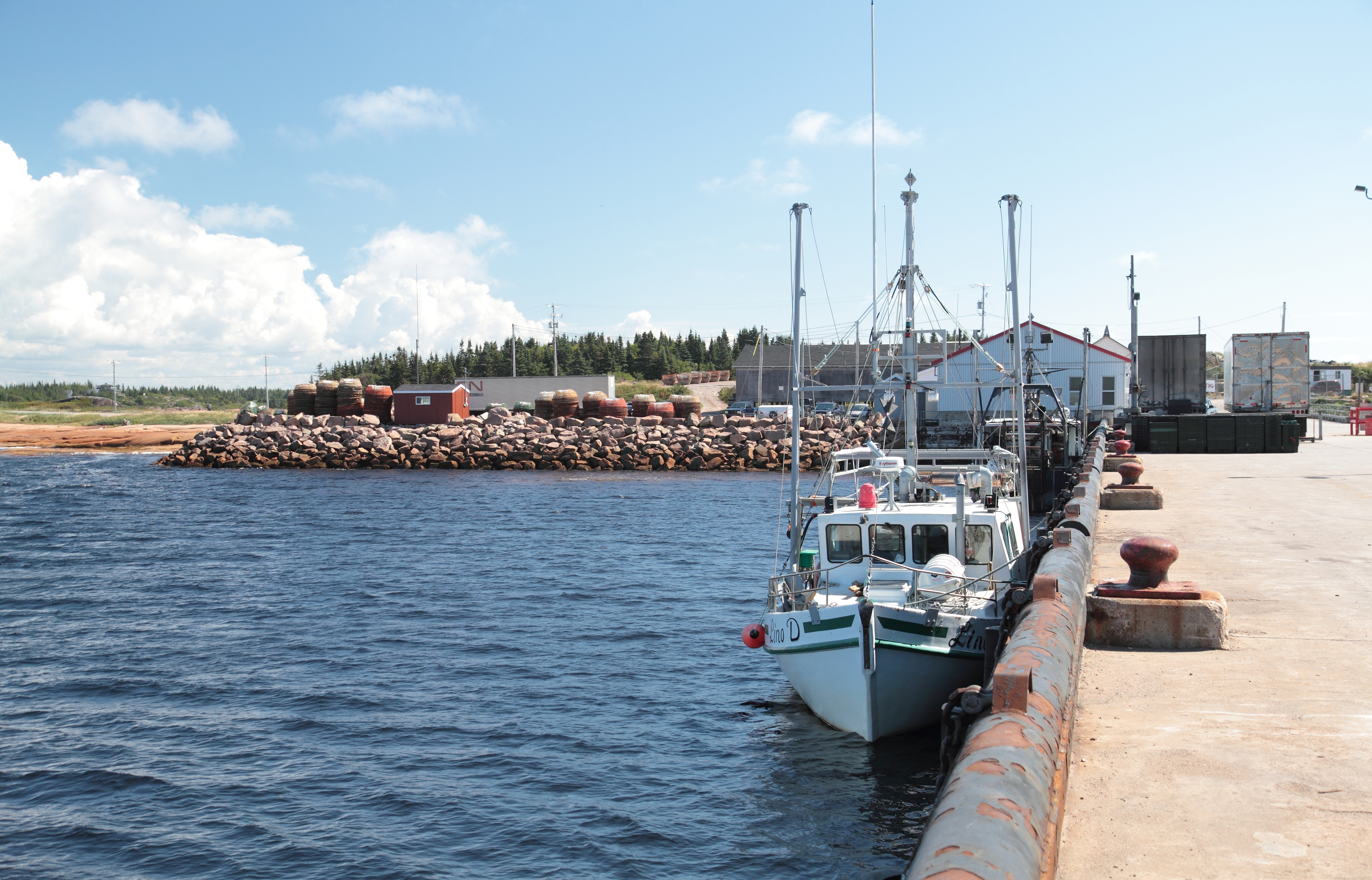
Natashquan Marine Terminal warf

Almost all of Quebec's ports are located along the St. Lawrence River seaway, from its source to its gulf, to the Atlantic Ocean. The main ports of the Gulf of St. Lawrence, on the Côte-Nord shore are: Blanc-Sablon, Harrington Harbor, Natashquan, Havre-Saint-Pierre, Mingan, Port-Menier (Anticosti Island), Cap-aux-Meules (Îles-de-la-Madeleine).

=== Climate ===
Natashquan experiences a borderline subarctic climate (Köppen Dfc) that is just short of being classed as a humid continental climate (Köppen Dfb). Summers are mild, moderated by the Gulf of St Lawrence and winters are cold and snowy, with annual snowfall averaging 140 inches (356 cm).

Climate data for Natashquan WMO ID: 71513; coordinates 50°11′24″N 61°47′20″W; elevation: 11.9 m (39 ft); 1991–2020 normals, extremes 1914–present
Month	Jan	Feb	Mar	Apr	May	Jun	Jul	Aug	Sep	Oct	Nov	Dec	Year
Record high humidex	8.1	7.0	10.0	16.7	25.2	30.8	35.9	33.2	31.2	22.1	15.0	8.7	35.9
Record high °C (°F)	8.2 (46.8)	7.5 (45.5)	12.8 (55.0)	17.8 (64.0)	23.9 (75.0)	27.5 (81.5)	29.1 (84.4)	28.3 (82.9)	26.1 (79.0)	19.4 (66.9)	14.4 (57.9)	9.4 (48.9)	29.1 (84.4)
Mean daily maximum °C (°F)	−7.4 (18.7)	−6.8 (19.8)	−1.9 (28.6)	3.5 (38.3)	10.4 (50.7)	16.0 (60.8)	19.5 (67.1)	19.4 (66.9)	14.9 (58.8)	8.9 (48.0)	2.7 (36.9)	−3.5 (25.7)	6.3 (43.3)
Daily mean °C (°F)	−12.9 (8.8)	−12.3 (9.9)	−7.1 (19.2)	−0.5 (31.1)	5.8 (42.4)	11.3 (52.3)	15.1 (59.2)	14.8 (58.6)	10.3 (50.5)	4.9 (40.8)	−1.2 (29.8)	−8.0 (17.6)	1.7 (35.1)
Mean daily minimum °C (°F)	−18.2 (−0.8)	−17.8 (0.0)	−12.2 (10.0)	−4.5 (23.9)	1.1 (34.0)	6.5 (43.7)	10.6 (51.1)	10.1 (50.2)	5.7 (42.3)	0.9 (33.6)	−5.0 (23.0)	−12.5 (9.5)	−3.0 (26.6)
Record low °C (°F)	−42.8 (−45.0)	−38.8 (−37.8)	−33.7 (−28.7)	−24.1 (−11.4)	−12.8 (9.0)	−3.9 (25.0)	1.1 (34.0)	−1.1 (30.0)	−7.8 (18.0)	−15.0 (5.0)	−25.6 (−14.1)	−35.0 (−31.0)	−42.8 (−45.0)
Record low wind chill	−52.3	−47.9	−42.9	−31.3	−17.9	−15.0	0.0	−3.4	−8.1	−19.6	−30.4	−46.2	−52.3
Average precipitation mm (inches)	76.3 (3.00)	62.3 (2.45)	91.0 (3.58)	65.9 (2.59)	86.0 (3.39)	81.2 (3.20)	113.2 (4.46)	80.7 (3.18)	97.7 (3.85)	107.9 (4.25)	95.8 (3.77)	82.1 (3.23)	1,039.9 (40.94)
Average rainfall mm (inches)	17.6 (0.69)	13.4 (0.53)	26.7 (1.05)	50.9 (2.00)	82.1 (3.23)	88.0 (3.46)	105.4 (4.15)	93.7 (3.69)	95.0 (3.74)	98.8 (3.89)	69.3 (2.73)	25.8 (1.02)	766.5 (30.18)
Average snowfall cm (inches)	79.5 (31.3)	61.2 (24.1)	67.7 (26.7)	30.8 (12.1)	4.1 (1.6)	0.0 (0.0)	0.0 (0.0)	0.0 (0.0)	0.0 (0.0)	5.0 (2.0)	34.9 (13.7)	72.3 (28.5)	355.4 (139.9)
Average precipitation days (≥ 0.2 mm)	17.2	15.8	15.5	13.2	14.3	12.7	16.0	12.7	14.1	15.0	15.3	16.7	178.5
Average rainy days (≥ 0.2 mm)	1.9	2.4	4.4	8.8	13.5	12.8	15.0	12.8	13.7	14.5	9.3	4.3	113.2
Average snowy days (≥ 0.2 cm)	18.7	15.7	14.0	8.8	1.5	0.0	0.0	0.0	0.0	2.0	9.2	16.1	86.0
Average relative humidity (%) (at 1500 LST)	69.9	67.7	69.0	70.6	67.7	69.5	74.4	74.3	74.1	72.8	73.6	72.9	71.4
Mean monthly sunshine hours	103.3	120.9	146.6	165.3	205.6	224.0	235.3	227.8	171.4	126.0	96.4	86.7	1,909.3
Percentage possible sunshine	38.8	42.7	39.9	40.1	43.0	45.8	47.7	50.8	45.1	37.7	35.4	34.4	41.8
Source: Environment Canada (rain/rain days, snow/snow days and sun 1981–2010)

== Demographics ==
Canada census – Natashquan community profile

	2021	2016	2011
Population	262 (-0.4% from 2016)	263 (-5.1% from 2011)	246 (-6.8% from 2006)
Land area	667.91 km^{2} (257.88 sq mi)	197.60 km^{2} (76.29 sq mi)	203.51 km^{2} (78.58 sq mi)
Population density	0.4/km^{2} (1.0/sq mi)	1.3/km^{2} (3.4/sq mi)	1.2/km^{2} (3.1/sq mi)
Median age	52.4 (M: 55.6, F: 48.4)	53.5 (M: 54.8, F: 52.0)	52.5 (M: 52.8, F: 51.8)
Private dwellings	156 (total) 121 (occupied)	158 (total)	165 (total)
Median household income	$72,000	$63,360	$.N/A

Notes: 2011 income data for this area has been suppressed for data quality or confidentiality reasons.
References: 2021 2016 2011

Historical Census Data – Natashquan, Quebec (township)

Year	Pop.	±%
1921	263	—
1931	321	+22.1%
1941	236	−26.5%
1951	435	+84.3%
1956	425	−2.3%
1961	549	+29.2%

Year	Pop.	±%
1966	523	−4.7%
1971	442	−15.5%
1976	427	−3.4%
1981	451	+5.6%
1986	401	−11.1%
1991	380	−5.2%

Year	Pop.	±%
1996	356	−6.3%
2001	366	+2.8%
2006	264	−27.9%
2011	277	+4.9%
2016	263	−5.1%
2021	262	−0.4%

Source: Statistics Canada

=== Language ===
Mother tongue (2021):

- English as first language: 1.9%
- French as first language: 96.1%
- English and French as first language: 0%
- Other as first language: 3.8%

== Notable people ==
Natashquan is the birthplace of singer Gilles Vigneault, who named a song after the municipality ("C'est à Natashquan") on the 2008 album Arriver Chez Soi.

Ghislain Viger, a man who lived in the community for several years from 1981 until his still-unsolved disappearance in 1986, was the subject of the 2025 short documentary film The Punk of Natashquan (Le Punk de Natashquan).
