= Central Mountain Air =

Regional airline of Canada

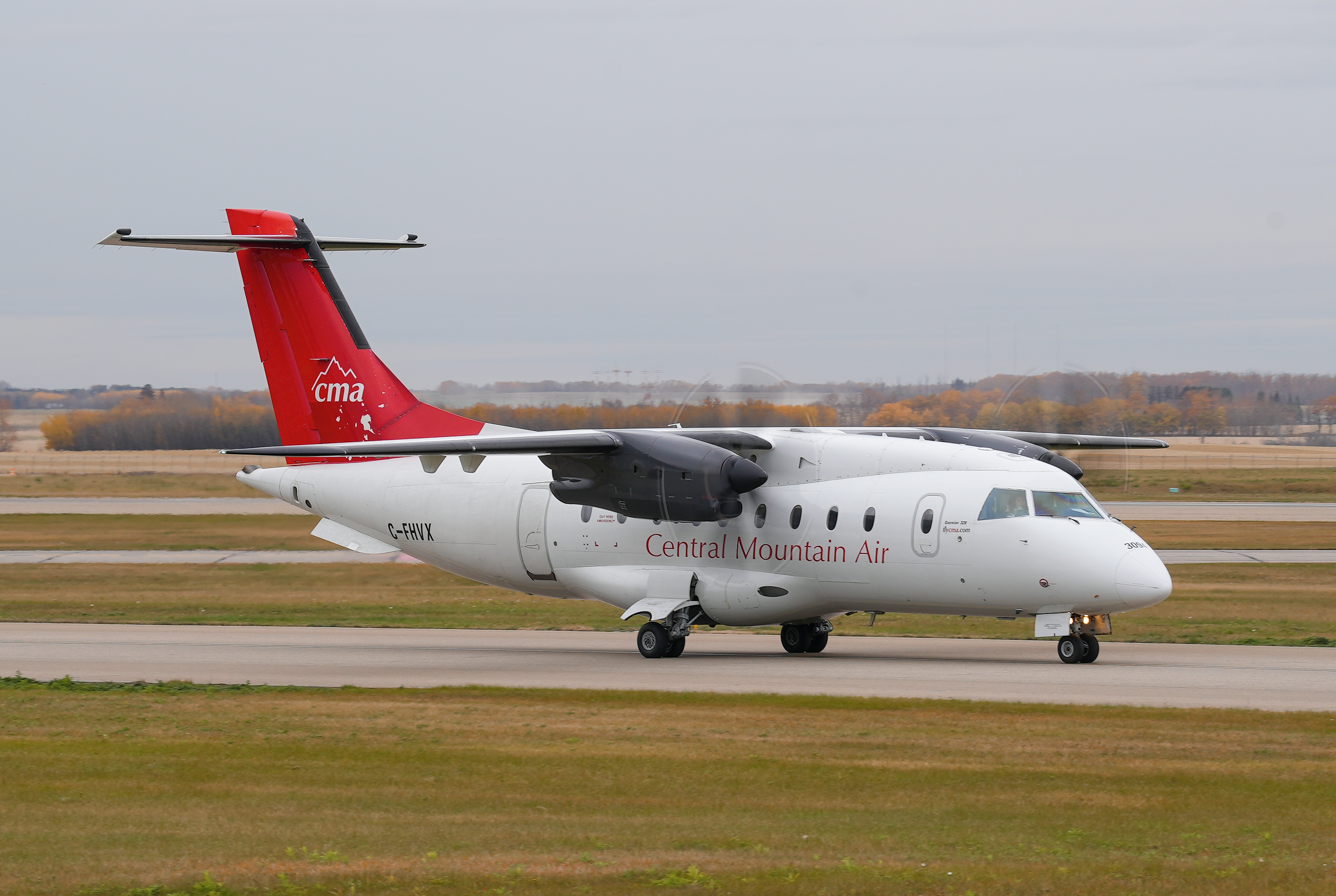
- CMA Dornier 328
IATA	ICAO	Call sign
9M	GLR	GLACIER
- Founded: 1987; 39 years ago
- AOC #: 3999
- Operating bases: Smithers (main); Calgary; Edmonton; Prince George; Vancouver
- Fleet size: 22
- Destinations: 9
- Headquarters: Smithers, British Columbia
- Website: www.flycma.com

Central Mountain Air Ltd. is a Canadian regional airline based in Smithers, British Columbia. It operates scheduled, charter, cargo, and transborder services. Its main base is Smithers Airport, with other bases at Calgary International Airport, Edmonton International Airport, Prince George Airport, and Vancouver International Airport, Winnipeg, Hamilton, Montreal, Blanc-Sablon.

== History ==
The airline was established and started operations in 1987; it is wholly owned by 580741 BC. In 1997 Central Mountain Air placed an order for additional Raytheon Beech 1900D Airliner aircraft and began operating as an Air Canada connector, replacing Air BC operating several routes within Alberta and British Columbia, latterly under the Air Canada Express banner. In October 2011, Central Mountain Air ceased its Capacity Purchase Agreement (CPA) with Air Canada. The agreement had been for flights from Calgary to Lethbridge, Medicine Hat and Cranbrook. Central Mountain Air continues to be an Air Canada codeshare partner for flights from Vancouver to Quesnel, and Williams Lake.

In late 2005, the first of two Dornier 328 were delivered to the airline, for use on chartered and scheduled flights. In 2014 they received their third Dornier 328. In March 2010, 580741 BC, the parent company of Central Mountain Air, purchased fellow British Columbia-based airline Hawkair. On November 18, 2016, Hawkair declared bankruptcy, had all assets seized for liquidation, and permanently suspended operations.

Central Mountain Air is the sister company of Northern Thunderbird Air, which operates charter and cargo services from Prince George.

== Destinations ==
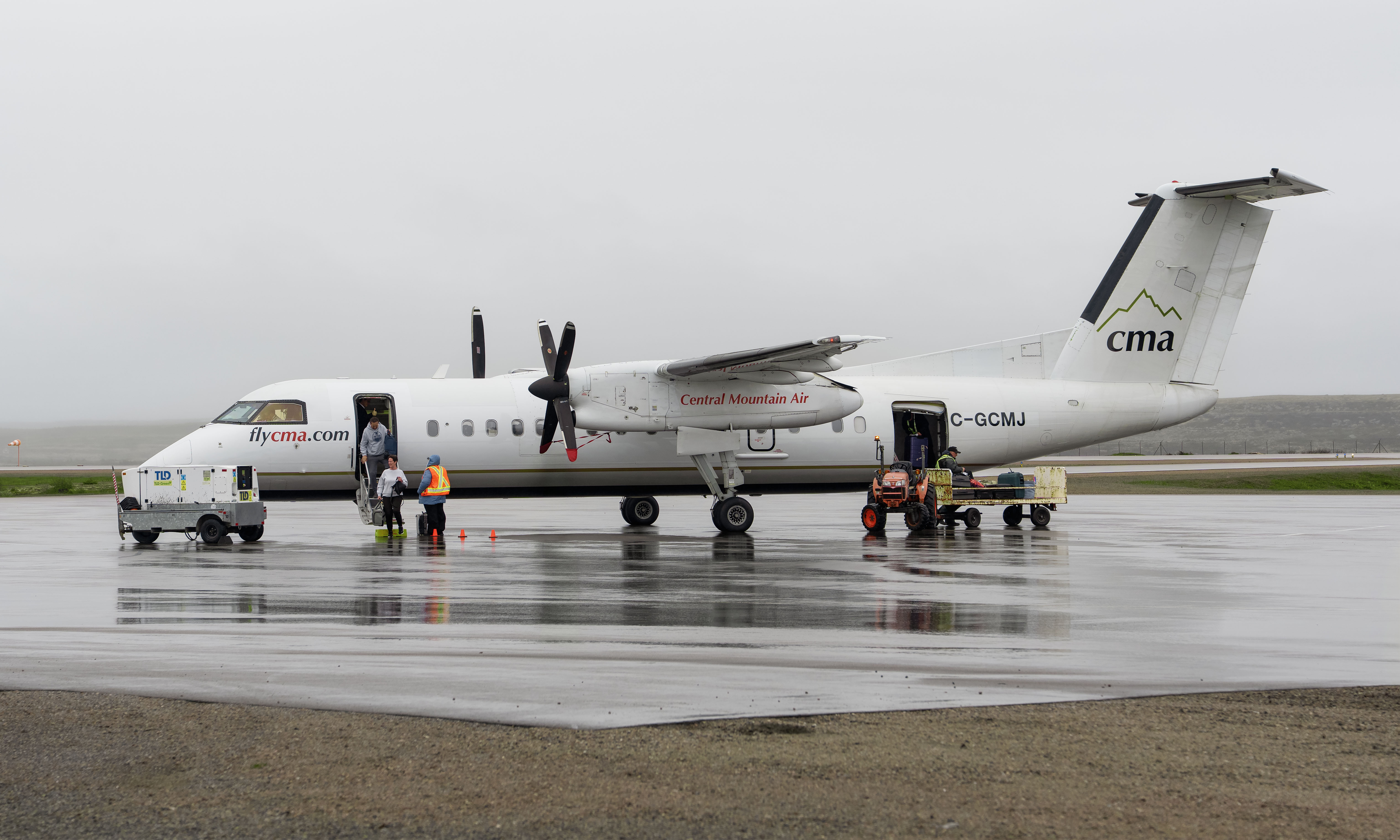
A Central Mountain Air Dash 8-300 at Lourdes-de-Blanc-Sablon Airport

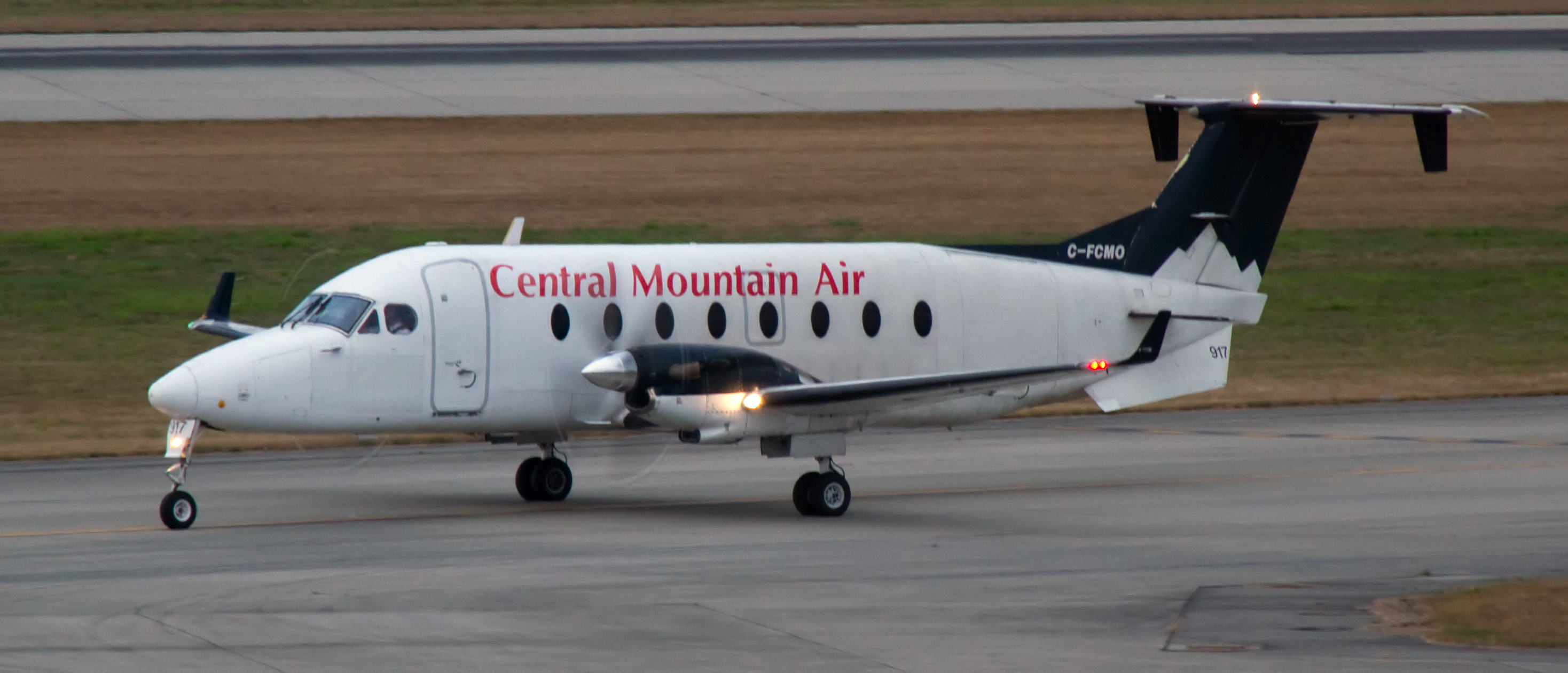
A Central Mountain Air Beechcraft 1900 at Vancouver International Airport

Central Mountain Air operates services to the following domestic scheduled destinations (as of July 2024):

- British Columbia
  - Fort Nelson (Fort Nelson Airport)
  - Kelowna (Kelowna International Airport)
  - Prince George (Prince George Airport)
  - Quesnel (Quesnel Airport)
  - Terrace-Kitimat (Northwest Regional Airport Terrace-Kitimat)
  - Vancouver (Vancouver International Airport)
  - Williams Lake (Williams Lake Airport)
- Alberta
  - Edmonton (Edmonton International Airport)
  - High Level (High Level Airport)
- Quebec
  - Montreal
  - Quebec City
  - Baie Comeau
  - Sept Iles
  - Port Menier
  - Havre-Saint-Pierre
  - Natashquan
  - La Romaine
  - Chevery
  - St Augustin
  - Blanc Sablon

=== Interline agreements ===
- Air Canada

== Fleet ==
As of June 21, 2026, the Central Mountain Air fleet includes the following aircraft:

Central Mountain Air fleet
Aircraft	In service	Passengers	Notes
Beechcraft 1900D	14	18	Several are being converted to freighters
de Havilland Canada Dash 8 Series 100	5	37	
de Havilland Canada Dash 8 300	5	50	
de Havilland Canada Dash 8 Q400	1	76	
Dornier 328	3	30	
Total	28		
