= Sept-Îles Airport =

Airport in Quebec, Canada

Sept-Îles Airport Aéroport de Sept-Îles
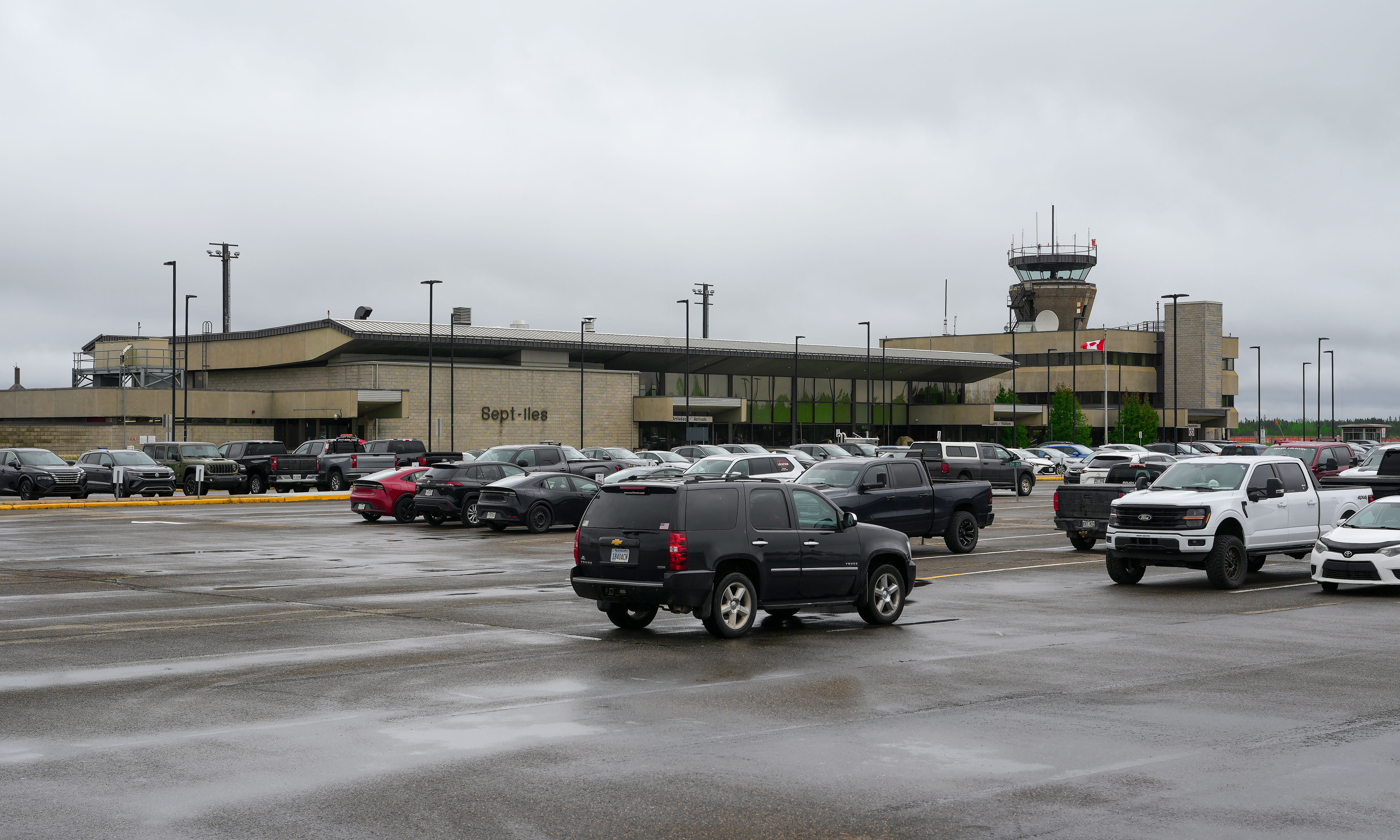
- Exterior of the passenger terminal

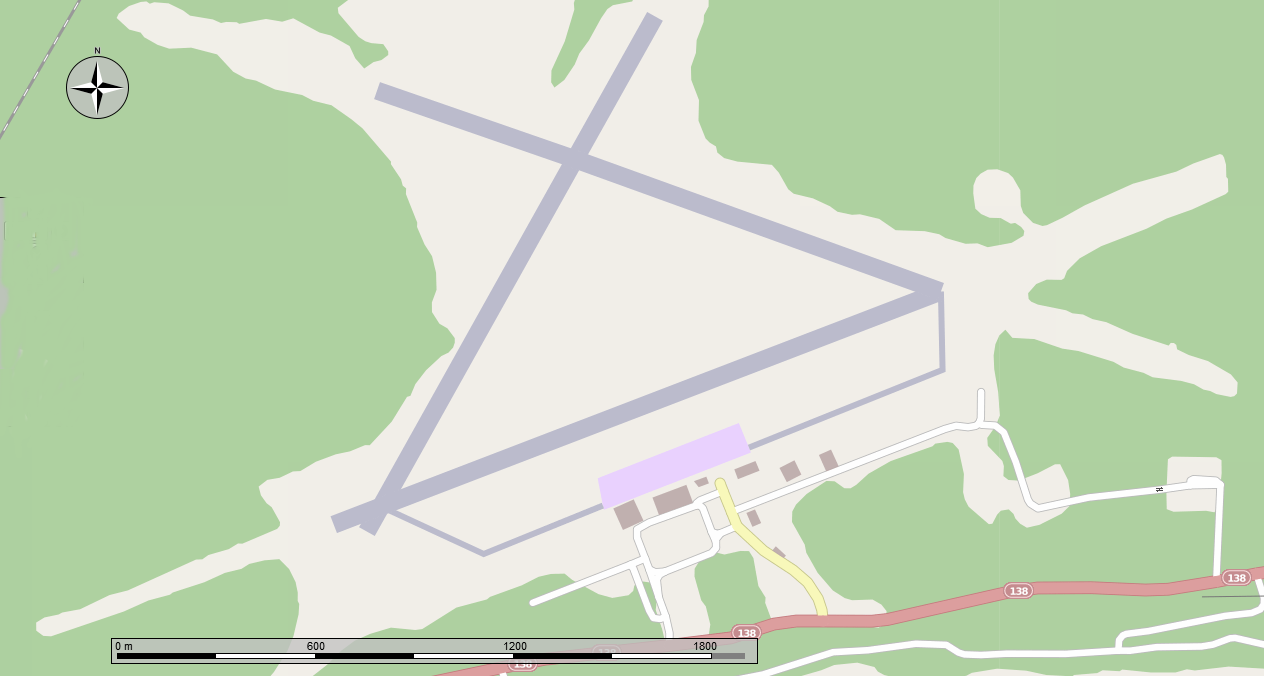
- Airport map
- IATA: YZV; ICAO: CYZV; WMO: 71279

Summary
- Airport type: Public
- Operator: Transport Canada
- Location: Sept-Îles, Quebec
- Time zone: EST (UTC−05:00)
  - Summer (DST): EDT (UTC−04:00)
- Elevation AMSL: 180 ft / 55 m
- Coordinates: 50°13′24″N 066°15′56″W

Map

Runways
Direction	Length		Surface
Direction	ft	m	Surface
09/27	6,552	1,997	Asphalt
13/31	5,771	1,759	Asphalt

Statistics (2010/2011)
- Aircraft movements: 29,922 (2011)
- Total passengers: 106,108 (2010)
- Sources: Canada Flight Supplement; Environment Canada; Movements from Statistics Canada; Passenger numbers from Statistics Canada

Sept-Îles Airport (IATA: YZV, ICAO: CYZV) is situated 4.5 nautical miles (8.3 km; 5.2 mi) east of the town of Sept-Îles, Quebec, Canada.

The airport is classified as an airport of entry by Nav Canada and is staffed by the Canada Border Services Agency (CBSA) on a call-out basis from the Québec City Jean Lesage International Airport. CBSA officers at this airport can handle general aviation aircraft only, with no more than fifteen passengers.

== Airlines and destinations ==
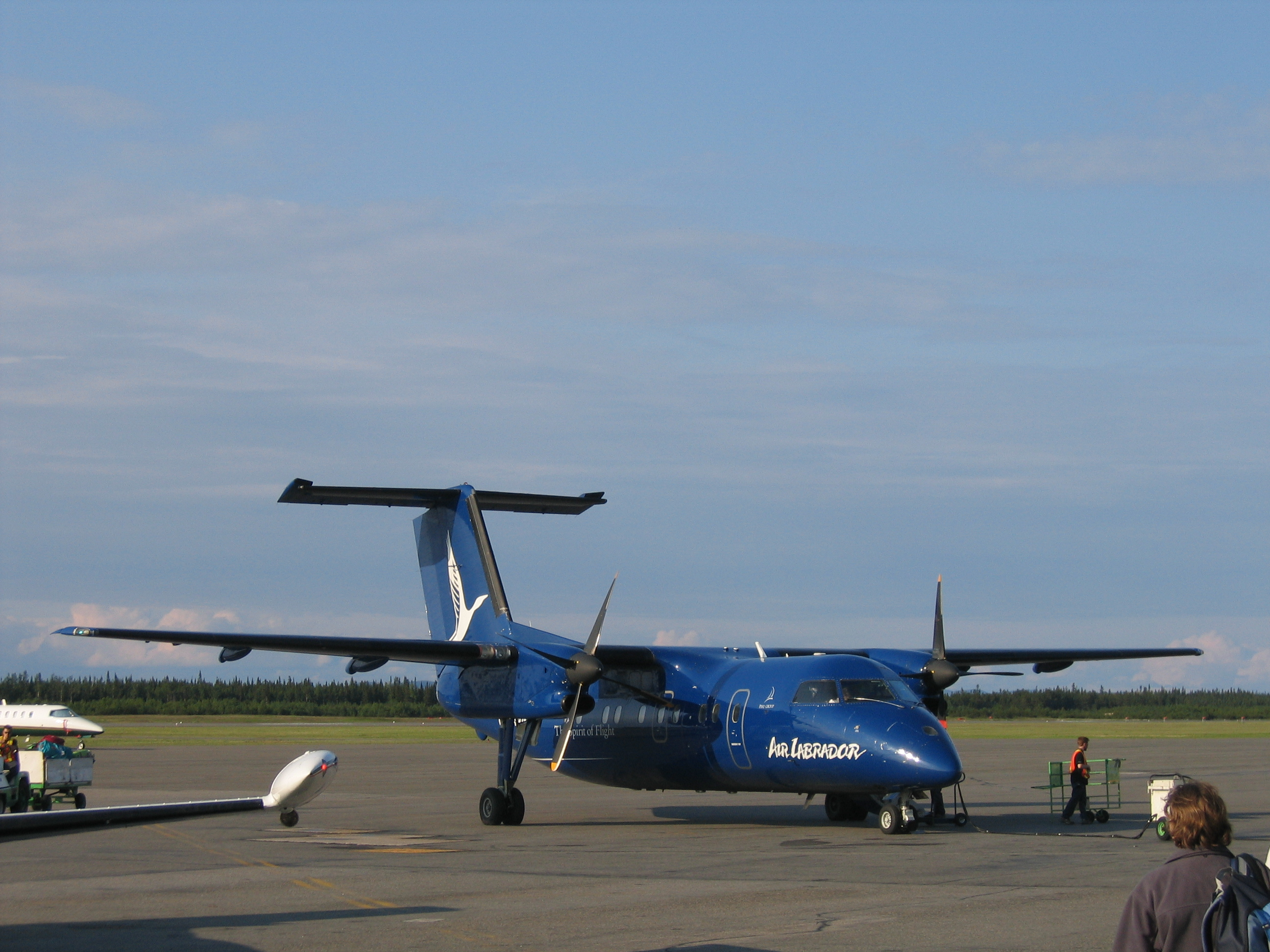
A Dash 8 of Air Labrador at the airport.

Airlines	Destinations
Air Canada Express	Montréal–Trudeau
PAL Airlines	Montréal–Trudeau, Wabush

== See also ==
- List of airports in Quebec#Sept-Îles/Lac Rapides Water Aerodrome
