= List of airports in Quebec =

This is a list of airports in Quebec. It includes all Nav Canada certified and registered water and land airports, aerodromes and heliports in the Canadian province of Quebec. Airport names in italics are part of the National Airports System.

Quebec

== List of airports and heliports ==
The list is sorted by the name of the community served; click the sort buttons in the table header to switch listing order.

Community	Airport name	PU PR MI	AOE (Note: An airport of entry has four different categories. An AOE which can accept "all classes of scheduled and non-scheduled aircraft (passenger and cargo)." An AOE/# which can handle aircraft in the previous category but up to maximum number. This number can be exceeded if done in stages as shown in parentheses. An AOE/15 that can accept general aviation aircraft with a maximum of 15 passengers. An AOE/CAN which can handle aircraft subject to the CANPASS regulations.)	Operator	Elevation	ICAO	TC LID	IATA	Image	Coordinates
Akulivik	Akulivik Airport	PU		Administration régionale Kativik	76 ft (23 m)	CYKO		AKV		60°49′07″N 78°08′55″W
Alma	Alma Airport	PU		CIDAL	448 ft (137 m)	CYTF		YTF		48°30′31″N 71°38′29″W
Alma	Alma (Rivière La Grande Décharge) Water Aerodrome	PU		Air Maintenance, Martin Bouchard	230 ft (70 m)		CGD2			48°33′48″N 71°36′57″W
Amos	Amos/Magny Airport	PU		Town of Amos	1,069 ft (326 m)	CYEY		YEY		48°33′54″N 78°14′57″W
Aupaluk	Aupaluk Airport	PU		Administration régionale Kativik	121 ft (37 m)	CYLA		YPJ		59°17′48″N 69°35′59″W
Baie-Comeau	Baie-Comeau Airport	PU	CANPASS	MRC Manicouagan	71 ft (22 m)	CYBC		YBC		49°07′57″N 68°12′16″W
Baie-Comeau	Baie-Comeau (Manic 1) Airport	PR		Association des pilotes de Manicouagan	250 ft (76 m)		CSL9			49°11′04″N 68°21′45″W
Barrage Gouin Lodge (Saint-Maurice River)	Barrage Gouin Water Aerodrome	PU		Pourvoirie du Barrage Gouin et Magnan	1,325 ft (404 m)		CTP3			48°21′15″N 74°06′10″W
Bécancour	Bécancour Heliport	PR		Société du Parc Industriel et Portuair de Bécancour	31 ft (9.4 m)		CSV3			46°21′52″N 72°23′44″W
Blanc-Sablon	Lourdes-de-Blanc-Sablon Airport	PU		Transport Canada	122 ft (37 m)	CYBX		YBX		51°26′37″N 57°11′07″W
Bonaventure	Bonaventure Airport	PU		Airport Administration Transports Québec	123 ft (37 m)	CYVB		YVB		48°04′16″N 65°27′37″W
Bonaventure	Bonadventure (H. Stever) Heliport	PR		Harvey Stever	52 ft (16 m)		CBS3			48°03′04″N 65°26′48″W
Bromont	Roland-Désourdy Airport (Bromont (Roland Désourdy) Airport)	PU	15	Régie Aéroportuaire Régionale des Cantons de l'Est	375 ft (114 m)	CZBM		ZBM		45°17′27″N 72°44′29″W
Caniapiscau	Lac Pau (Caniapiscau) Water Aerodrome	PU		Air Tunilik	1,657 ft (505 m)		CTP4			54°50′42″N 69°52′55″W
Carignan	Carignan (Bouthiller) Aerodrome	PR		Serge Boutillier	3,000 ft (910 m)		CRG3			45°28′40″N 73°18′05″W
Carignan	Carignan/Rivère l'Acadie Water Aerodrome	PR		René Boutillier	30 ft (9.1 m)		CJF2			45°28′26″N 73°17′42″W
Cascades	Cascades Water Aerodrome	PU		Roland Lebel	340 ft (100 m)		CTY3			45°35′09″N 75°52′05″W
Causapscal	Causapscal Airport	PU		Ferme Gendron	340 ft (100 m)		CTF3			48°18′41″N 67°15′05″W
Charlevoix	Charlevoix Airport	PU	CANPASS	RMC Charlevoix-Est	977 ft (298 m)	CYML		YML		47°35′51″N 70°13′26″W
Chevery	Chevery Airport	PU		Municipalité de Côte-Nord-du-Golfe-du-Saint-Laurent	39 ft (12 m)	CYHR		YHR		50°28′08″N 59°38′12″W
Chibougamau	Chibougamau Heliport	PU		Hamel Multiservices	1,250 ft (380 m)		CSB4			49°54′16″N 74°23′02″W
Chibougamau	Chibougamau/Chapais Airport	PU		Transports Québec	1,270 ft (390 m)	CYMT		YMT		49°46′19″N 74°31′41″W
Chibougamau	Chibougamau (Hydro-Québec) Heliport	PR		Hydro-Québec	1,270 ft (390 m)		CSE2			49°53′16″N 74°24′01″W
Chicoutimi	Chicoutimi (C. H. de Chicoutimi) Heliport	PR		CIUSSS du Saguenay-Lac-St-Jean	198 ft (60 m)		CCS7			48°25′33″N 71°02′52″W
Chicoutimi	Chicoutimi/Saint-Honoré Airport	PU		Transports Québec	544 ft (166 m)	CYRC				48°31′15″N 71°03′02″W
Chisasibi	Chisasibi Airport	PU		Nation Cri de Chisasibi	43 ft (13 m)		CSU2	YKU		53°48′20″N 78°55′01″W
Chute-des-Georges	Lac Lamothe Water Aerodrome	PR		Centre québécois de formation aéronautique (Cegep de Chicoutimi)	975 ft (297 m)		CLL3			48°44′22″N 71°08′18″W
Chute-Saint-Philippe	Chute-Saint-Philippe Aerodrome	PR		Yves Sigouin	860 ft (260 m)		CCP3			46°39′40″N 75°14′42″W
Clova	Clova/Lac Duchamp Water Aerodrome	PR		Pourvoirie Tamarac	1,375 ft (419 m)		CST6			48°06′36″N 75°21′57″W
Daniel-Johnson dam	Manic 5/Lac Louise Water Aerodrome	PU		Air Tunilik	1,300 ft (400 m)		CSH8			50°39′27″N 68°49′22″W
Danville	Danville Aerodrome	PR		Erick Dupuis	525 ft (160 m)		CDN2			45°47′39″N 71°59′42″W
Dolbeau-Mistassini	Dolbeau-Mistassini/Potvin Heli-Base Heliport	PR		R. Potvin	425 ft (130 m)		CPH4			48°55′51″N 72°12′18″W
Drummondville	Drummondville Airport	PU	15	DE (Drummondville Économique) Aéroport Drummondville	368 ft (112 m)		CSC3			45°50′37″N 72°23′51″W
Drummondville	Drummondville Water Aerodrome	PR	15/SEA	DE (Drummondville Économique) Aéroport Drummondville	320 ft (98 m)		CSA7			45°51′16″N 72°23′22″W
Eastmain	Eastmain River Airport	PU		Transport Canada, Cree Nation of Eastmain	24 ft (7.3 m)	CZEM		ZEM		52°13′35″N 78°31′21″W
Farnham	Farnham Airport	PR		Parachute Montreal Rive Nord & Rive Sud	180 ft (55 m)		CSN7			45°17′08″N 73°00′28″W
Fermont	Fermont Heliport	PR		Heli Fermont Enr.	2,009 ft (612 m)		CSD5			52°48′22″N 67°06′08″W
Fontanges	Fontages Airport	PR		Hydro-Québec	1,550 ft (470 m)		CTU2	YFG		54°33′14″N 71°10′24″W
Forestville	Forestville Airport	PU		Town of Forestville	293 ft (89 m)	CYFE		YFE		48°44′46″N 69°05′50″W
Gaspé	Michel-Pouliot Gaspé Airport (Gaspé (Michel-Pouliot) Airport)	PU	CANPASS	Municipality of Gaspé	112 ft (34 m)	CYGP		YGP		48°46′30″N 64°28′54″W
Gatineau	Gatineau-Ottawa Executive Airport (Ottawa/Gatineau Airport)	PU	15	La Corporation de l'Aéroport Exécutif Gatineau-Ottawa	211 ft (64 m)	CYND		YND		45°31′17″N 75°33′51″W
Gatineau	Ottawa/Gatineau (Casino) Heliport	PU		Casiloc Inc.	220 ft (67 m)		CTA9			45°26′48″N 75°43′36″W
Gatineau	Rivière Blanche/Cardinal Aviation Water Aerodrome	PR		Michael Cardinal Aviation; M5 Aviation	300 ft (91 m)		CRB7			45°32′41″N 75°37′40″W
Granby	Granby/Artopex Plus Heliport	PR		Groupe Pro Plus	293 ft (89 m)		CTR4			45°23′27″N 72°45′58″W
Grande-Rivière	du Rocher-Percé (Pabok) Airport	PU		MRC du Rocher-Percé	87 ft (27 m)		CTG3			48°23′02″N 64°33′46″W
Harrington Harbour	Harrington Harbour Heliport	PU		Transports Québec	93 ft (28 m)		CTH5			50°29′51″N 59°28′53″W
Havre-Saint-Pierre	Havre Saint-Pierre Airport	PU		OPSIS Services Aéroportuaires	125 ft (38 m)	CYGV		YGV		50°16′55″N 63°36′41″W
Havre-Saint-Pierre	Havre Saint-Pierre Water Aerodrome	PR		Air Tunilik	100 ft (30 m)		CTE3			50°15′48″N 63°33′02″W
Hibbard	Casey (Camp de Base) Aerodrome	PR		Stratos Aero	1,291 ft (393 m)		CSQ4			47°56′15″N 74°05′26″W
Inukjuak	Inukjuak Airport	PU		Administration régionale Kativik	86 ft (26 m)	CYPH		YPH		58°28′19″N 78°04′37″W
Isle-aux-Grues	Isle-aux-Grues Airport	PU		Transports Québec	49 ft (15 m)		CSH2			47°04′20″N 70°32′00″W
Ivujivik	Ivujivik Airport	PU		Administration régionale Kativik	127 ft (39 m)	CYIK		YIK		62°25′02″N 77°53′31″W
Joliette	Joliette Airport	PU		Aeroclub de Joliette Inc	225 ft (69 m)		CSG3			46°02′42″N 73°30′06″W
Kanawata	Kanawata Aeroparc	PR		Kanawata 2021 Inc.	1,350 ft (410 m)		CSJ2			47°35′41″N 74°08′01″W
Kangiqsualujjuaq	Kangiqsualujjuaq (Georges River) Airport	PU		Administration régionale Kativik	217 ft (66 m)	CYLU		XGR		58°42′41″N 65°59′34″W
Kangiqsujuaq	Kangiqsujuaq (Wakeham Bay) Airport	PU		Administration régionale Kativik	517 ft (158 m)	CYKG		YWB		61°35′19″N 71°55′46″W
Kangirsuk	Kangirsuk Airport	PU		Administration régionale Kativik	406 ft (124 m)	CYAS		YKG		60°01′38″N 69°59′57″W
Kattiniq	Kattiniq/Donaldson Airport	PR		Glencore Canada Corporation - Raglan Mine	1,902 ft (580 m)		CTP9	YAU		61°39′44″N 73°19′17″W
Kuujjuaq	Kuujjuaq Airport	PU		Administration régionale Kativik	131 ft (40 m)	CYVP		YVP		58°05′46″N 68°25′37″W
Kuujjuarapik	Kuujjuarapik Airport	PU		Administration régionale Kativik	40 ft (12 m)	CYGW		YGW		55°16′55″N 77°45′55″W
L'Isle-aux-Coudres	Île aux Coudres Airport	PU		Services d'aviation Wyman	110 ft (34 m)		CTA3			47°23′22″N 70°23′04″W
Île aux Oies	Îles aux Oies Heliport	PR		Les Hélicoptères Canadiens	3 ft (0.91 m)		CIO2			47°08′15″N 70°28′42″W
La Baie	CFB Bagotville (Bagotville Airport)	MI	AOE/M, 30	Royal Canadian Air Force	522 ft (159 m)	CYBG		YBG		48°19′50″N 70°59′49″W
Lac-à-Beauce	Lac-à-Beauce Water Aerodrome	PR		Aviation La Tuque	670 ft (200 m)		CSS7			47°19′17″N 72°45′54″W
Lac-à-la-Tortue	Lac-à-la-Tortue Airport	PR		Bel Air Laurentian Aviation Inc	434 ft (132 m)		CSL3			46°37′18″N 72°37′49″W
Lac-à-la-Tortue	Lac-à-la-Tortue Water Aerodrome	PU		Bel Air Laurentian Aviation Inc	427 ft (130 m)		CSU7			46°37′00″N 72°37′33″W
Lac Berthelot	Lac Berthelot Water Aerodrome	PU		Gary Koch/Berthelot Lake Lodge	1,250 ft (380 m)		CTS3			48°31′12″N 76°09′45″W
Lac-des-Écorces	Lac-des-Écorces/Heliport Belle-Île	PR		Excellence Aviation SB	802 ft (244 m)		CDE2			46°31′30″N 75°23′07″W
Lac-des-Écorces	Lac-des-Écorces Water Aerodrome	PR		N. Arbour	753 ft (230 m)		CTV2			46°32′55″N 75°25′07″W
Lac-des-Loups	Parc Gatineau Water Aerodrome	PR		Richard Ashby	640 ft (200 m)		CSD9			45°41′00″N 76°12′31″W
Lac-Etchemin	Lac Etchemin Airport	PU		City of Lac-Etchemin	1,500 ft (460 m)		CSC5			46°24′26″N 70°30′05″W
Lachute	Lachute Airport	PU	CANPASS	Lachute Aviation	221 ft (67 m)		CSE4			45°38′22″N 74°22′14″W
Lac-Simon	Lac Simon (Blais Aéronautique Inc) Water Aerodrome	PR		Blais Aéronautique	672 ft (205 m)		CLS7			45°54′46″N 75°05′42″W
Lac Trévet	Lac Trévet Water Aerodrome	PR		Pourvoirie Balbuzard Sauvage Inc	1,420 ft (430 m)		CTX2			48°09′34″N 76°08′16″W
La Grande-3 generating station	La Grande-3 Airport	PR		Hydro-Québec	775 ft (236 m)	CYAD		YAR		53°34′19″N 76°11′47″W
La Grande-4 generating station	La Grande-4 Airport	PR		Hydro-Québec	1,005 ft (306 m)	CYAH		YAH		53°45′17″N 73°40′31″W
La Romaine	La Romaine Airport	PU		Ministère des transports et de la mobilité durable	93 ft (28 m)		CTT5	ZGS		50°15′35″N 60°40′46″W
La Sarre	La Sarre Airport	PU		City of La Sarre	1,048 ft (319 m)		CSR8	SSQ		48°55′02″N 79°10′43″W
La Tabatière	La Tabatière Airport	PU		Ministère des transports et de la mobilité durable	102 ft (31 m)		CTU5	ZLT		50°49′51″N 58°58′32″W
La Tuque	La Tuque Airport	PU		Air Aviation Inc	550 ft (170 m)	CYLQ		YLQ		47°24′33″N 72°47′21″W
La Tuque	La Tuque Water Aerodrome	PR		Aviation La Tuque	475 ft (145 m)		CTH6			47°27′41″N 72°46′52″W
Lebel-sur-Quévillon	Lebel-sur-Quévillon Airport	PR		Ville de Lebel-sur-Quévillon	61 ft (19 m)		CSH4	YLS		49°01′47″N 77°00′59″W
Les Bergeronnes	Les Bergeronnes Aerodrome	PU		Municipalité Les Bergeronnes	69 ft (21 m)		CTH3			48°13′56″N 69°32′34″W
Les Cèdres	Montréal/Les Cèdres Heliport	PR		Canadian Helicopters	160 ft (49 m)		CSH6			45°20′52″N 74°05′07″W
Longueuil	Montreal Metropolitan Airport (Montréal/MET (Aéroport métropolitain de Montréal) Airport, Montréal Saint-Hubert - Longueuil Airport)	PU	15	DASH-L (Développement Aéroport Saint-Hubert de Longueuil)	90 ft (27 m)	CYHU		YHU		45°31′03″N 73°25′01″W
Longueuil	Montréal/Met (Aéroport Métropolitain de Montéal) Heli-Inter Heliport	PR		Heli-Inter	96 ft (29 m)		CTG2			45°31′54″N 73°24′43″W
Louiseville	Louiseville Airport	PU		Jardins Ricard Inc	40 ft (12 m)		CSJ4			46°14′46″N 72°54′16″W
Lourdes-de-Joliette	Lourdes-de-Joliette Airport	PR		École De Parachutisme Voltige 2001 Inc.	350 ft (110 m)		CSE3			46°06′34″N 73°27′10″W
Magdalen Islands	Îles-de-la-Madeleine Airport	PU	15	Transport Canada / Aéropro	35 ft (11 m)	CYGR		YGR		47°25′29″N 61°46′41″W
Magog	Magog/Aeria Helicentre Heliport	PR		Aeria Hélicentre	652 ft (199 m)		CMA3			45°16′55″N 72°06′11″W
Magog	Magog/Lessard Heliport	PR		Louis Lessard	682 ft (208 m)		CLS5			45°14′53″N 72°11′54″W
Manicouagan	Manic-5 Aerodrome	PR		Société de protection forêts contre le feu	1,332 ft (406 m)		CMN5			50°39′27″N 68°49′57″W
Maniwaki	Maniwaki Airport	PU		Régie intermunicipale de l’aéroport Maniwaki	659 ft (201 m)	CYMW		YMW		46°16′22″N 75°59′26″W
Mascouche	Lac Agile (Mascouche) Airport	PR		Gestion Wilburdea Inc	174 ft (53 m)		CSA2			45°47′28″N 73°38′17″W
Matagami	Matagami Airport	PU		Transports Québec	918 ft (280 m)	CYNM		YNM		49°45′42″N 77°48′10″W
Matane	Matane/Russell-Burnett Airport	PU		Town of Matane	103 ft (31 m)	CYME		YME		48°51′25″N 67°27′12″W
Mirage Lodge, Trans-Taiga Road	Pourvoirie Mirage Aerodrome	PR		Pourvoirie Mirage Inc.	1,336 ft (407 m)		CPM3			53°48′09″N 72°50′29″W
Mirage Lodge, Polaris Lake, Trans-Taiga Road	Lac Polaris (Pourvoirie Mirage Inc) Water Aerodrome	PR		Pourvoirie Mirage Inc.	1,300 ft (400 m)		CLP3			53°48′02″N 72°52′00″W
Mistissini	Mistissini Water Aerodrome	PR		Waasheshkun Airways	1,229 ft (375 m)		CSE6			50°25′00″N 73°52′00″W
Mont-Joli	Mont-Joli Airport	PU		Régie Intermunicipale	172 ft (52 m)	CYYY		YYY		48°36′32″N 68°12′29″W
Mont-Laurier	Mont-Laurier Airport	PU		A.P.P.A.	815 ft (248 m)		CSD4			46°33′52″N 75°34′40″W
Montmagny	Montmagny Airport	PU		Transports Québec	33 ft (10 m)		CSE5			47°00′07″N 70°30′57″W
Montreal	Montréal/Aéroparc Île Perrot	PR		Paul Fréchette	100 ft (30 m)		CSP6			45°22′34″N 73°54′26″W
Montreal	Montréal (Bell) Heliport	PR		Bell Helicopter Textron	221 ft (67 m)		CSW5			45°41′06″N 73°55′52″W
Montreal	Montréal/Boisvert & Fils Water Airport	PR		Boisvert & Fils Aviation	40 ft (12 m)		CSA4			45°38′44″N 73°35′49″W
Montreal	Montréal East (AIM) Heliport	PR		American Iron & Metal GP	179 ft (55 m)		CSH9			45°38′09″N 73°33′44″W
Montreal	Montréal/Heliport Senneville	PR		Richard Touchette	98 ft (30 m)		CHS5			45°26′34″N 73°57′38″W
Montreal	Montréal/Kruger Heliport	PR		Kruger	195 ft (59 m)		CSN2			45°30′25″N 73°38′09″W
Montreal	Montréal–Mirabel International Airport	PU	15 AOE/CARGO	Aéroports de Montréal	271 ft (83 m)	CYMX		YMX		45°40′47″N 74°02′19″W
Montreal	Montréal/Mirabel Hélico Heliport	PR		Mirabel Hélico	230 ft (70 m)		CMH4			45°41′44″N 73°57′09″W
Montreal	Montréal/Passport Hélico Heliport	PR		Passport Hélico	75 ft (23 m)		CPP8			45°43′21″N 73°35′43″W
Montreal	Montréal–Trudeau International Airport	PU	AOE, AOE/CARGO	Aéroports de Montréal	120 ft (37 m)	CYUL		YUL		45°28′14″N 73°44′27″W
Montreal	Montréal/Point Zero Heliport	PR		Point Zero	152 ft (46 m)		CPZ6			45°31′47″N 73°39′27″W
Montreal	Montréal (Sacre-Coeur) Heliport	PR		Sacre-Coeur Hospital	84 ft (26 m)		CSZ8			45°31′59″N 73°42′45″W
Mont-Tremblant	Mont-Tremblant/Heliport P3	PR		Héli-Tremblant	915 ft (279 m)		CHP3			46°11′43″N 74°34′16″W
Mont-Tremblant	Mont-Tremblant International Airport (La Mazaca/Mont Tremblant International Airport)	PR	15	Mont-Tremblant Intl Inc	825 ft (251 m)	CYFJ		YTM		46°24′34″N 74°46′48″W
Mont-Tremblant	Mont-Tremblant (Lac Maskinongé) Water Aerodrome	PR		Association Aviateurs Région Mont-Tremblant	790 ft (240 m)		CMT2			46°05′14″N 74°36′30″W
Mont-Valin	Rivière Bonnard Airport	PR		Société de protection des forêts contre le feu (SOPFEU)	1,585 ft (483 m)		CRB4			50°42′16″N 71°09′45″W
Montebello	Montebello Water Aerodrome	PR		3801179 Canada Inc	130 ft (40 m)		CSB6			45°38′02″N 74°58′39″W
Natashquan	Natashquan Airport	PU		Municipalité du Canton de Natashquan	39 ft (12 m)	CYNA		YNA		50°11′24″N 61°47′20″W
Natashquan	Natashquan (Lac de l'Avion) Water Aerodrome	PR		Air Tunilik	35 ft (11 m)		CSY8			50°11′21″N 61°45′14″W
Nemaska	Nemiscau Airport	PR		Hydro-Québec	802 ft (244 m)	CYHH		YNS		51°41′28″N 76°08′08″W
Neuville	Neuville Airport (Quebec/Neuville Airport)	PR		Neuville Aéro	314 ft (96 m)		CNV9			46°43′24″N 71°34′57″W
Nicolet	Nicolet Heliport	MI		DND Range Controller	33 ft (10 m)		CSK9			46°13′13″N 72°38′52″W
Opinaca Reservoir	Éléonore Aerodrome	PR		Newmont, Éléonore Mine	751 ft (229 m)		CEL8			52°43′07″N 76°04′49″W
Parent	Parent Airport	PU		Air Aviation	1,400 ft (430 m)	CYPP				47°55′55″N 74°36′29″W
Petawawa, Ontario (Ottawa River)	Petawawa \ Vermette Landing Water Aerodrome	PR		Luc Vermette	365 ft (111 m)		CVL4			45°56′35″N 77°16′00″W
Pintendre	Pintendre Aerodrome	PR		Jacques Bernier	270 ft (82 m)		CPT9			46°45′27″N 71°06′33″W
Port-Menier	Port-Menier Airport	PU		Transports Québec	168 ft (51 m)	CYPN		YPN		49°50′11″N 64°17′19″W
Port-Menier	Port-Menier (H. Stever) Heliport	PR		Harvey Stever	223 ft (68 m)		CPM2			49°50′48″N 64°06′12″W
Poste Lemoyne	Poste Lemoyne (Complex LG-3) Heliport	PR		Hydro-Québec	874 ft (266 m)		CSY6			53°28′58″N 75°01′53″W
Poste Montagnais	Poste Montagnais Airport (Poste Montagnais (Mile 134) Airport)	PR		Hydro-Québec	1,988 ft (606 m)		CSF3			51°53′17″N 65°42′52″W
Puvirnituq	Puvirnituq Airport	PU		Administration régionale Kativik	83 ft (25 m)	CYPX		YPX		60°03′02″N 77°17′13″W
Quaqtaq	Quaqtaq Airport	PU		Administration régionale Kativik	106 ft (32 m)	CYHA		YQC		61°02′47″N 69°37′04″W
Quebec City	Quebec/Capitale Hélicoptère Heliport	PR		Centre d'Affaires Capitale Hélipro	203 ft (62 m)		CCH7			46°48′03″N 71°22′27″W
Quebec City	Québec City Jean Lesage International Airport	PU	AOE	Aéroport de Québec Inc.	243 ft (74 m)	CYQB		YQB		46°47′28″N 71°23′36″W
Quebec City	Québec/Lac Saint-Augustin Water Airport	PR		Luc Forgues	133 ft (41 m)		CSN8			46°45′05″N 71°23′39″W
Radisson	La Grande Rivière Airport	PU		Société de développement de la Baie James	640 ft (200 m)	CYGL		YGL		53°37′31″N 77°42′15″W
Rawdon	Rawdon/Camping Pontbriand (Hydro) Water Aerodrome	PR		Léon Raymond	505 ft (154 m)		CCP5			46°03′12″N 73°45′22″W
Renard diamond mine	Renard Aerodrome	PR		Stornoway Diamonds	1,563 ft (476 m)		CFX5			52°43′50″N 72°13′15″W
Réservoir Gouin	Réservoir Gouin\Pourvoirie Escapade Aerodrome	PR		Air Tunilik	1,371 ft (418 m)		CGN2			48°25′43″N 74°31′06″W
Réservoir Gouin (Obedjiwan)	Réservoir Gouin/Pourvoirie Escapade Water Aerodrome	PR		Air Tunilik	1,350 ft (410 m)		CGN5			48°26′08″N 74°31′10″W
Réservoir Kiamika (Sainte-Véronique)	Réservoir Kiamika (Pourvoirie Cécaurel) Water Aerodrome	PR		Pourvoirie Cécaurel	850 ft (260 m)		CRK3			46°37′20″N 75°03′59″W
Rimouski	Rimouski Aerodrome	PU		City of Rimouski	82 ft (25 m)	CYXK		YXK		48°28′41″N 68°29′49″W
Rivière Bell	Rivière Bell Aerodrome	PR		SEPAQ Anticosti	94 ft (29 m)		CRB5			49°04′44″N 62°14′13″W
Rivière-aux-Saumons	Rivière-aux-Saumons Aerodrome	PR		Safari Anticosti	369 ft (112 m)		CTH7			49°24′05″N 62°17′44″W
Rivière-du-Loup	Rivière-du-Loup Airport	PU		Aéropro	426 ft (130 m)	CYRI		YRI		47°45′52″N 69°35′04″W
Rivière-du-Loup	Rivière-du-Loup Heliport	PR		Canadian Coast Guard	10 ft (3.0 m)		CSS2			47°50′56″N 69°32′32″W
Roberval	Roberval Airport	PU		Services ADR	586 ft (179 m)	CYRJ		YRJ		48°31′12″N 72°15′56″W
Rougemont	Rougemont Aerodrome	PR		Benoit Tétreault	80 ft (24 m)		CTY5			45°26′20″N 73°02′14″W
Rouyn-Noranda	Rouyn-Noranda Airport	PU		City of Rouyn-Noranda	988 ft (301 m)	CYUY		YUY		48°12′22″N 78°50′08″W
Sagard	Sagard Heliport	PR		Canadian Helicopters	785 ft (239 m)		CSG9			47°59′27″N 70°04′39″W
Saguenay	Saguenay (Harvey) Water Aerodrome	PR		10289221 Canada Inc.	30 ft (9.1 m)		CSA8			48°26′23″N 71°07′46″W
Saguenay	Saguenay/Oligny Heliport	PR		Chantel Lussier	551 ft (168 m)		COL5			48°18′58″N 71°13′21″W
Sainte-Agathe-des-Monts	Sainte-Agathe (AIM) Heliport	PR		La Compagnie Américaine de Fer st Métaux	1,250 ft (380 m)		CSV2			46°06′40″N 74°17′38″W
Saint-Alphonse-de-Granby	Saint-Alphonse/Lac Cloutier Water Aerodrome	PR		Fernand Rivest	720 ft (220 m)		CTC2			46°10′34″N 73°39′13″W
Saint-André-Avellin	Saint-André-Avellin Aerodrome	PR		Corporation Aérodrome Saint-André-Avellin	550 ft (170 m)		CAA2			45°44′28″N 75°04′20″W
Sainte-Anne-des-Monts	Sainte-Anne-des-Monts Aerodrome	PU		Fire Department	73 ft (22 m)	CYSZ				49°07′12″N 66°31′44″W
Sainte-Anne-du-Lac	Sainte-Anne-du-Lac (Aviation PLMG Inc.) Aerodrome	PR		Aviation PLMG Inc.	880 ft (270 m)		CAL8			46°53′04″N 75°19′58″W
Sainte-Anne-du-Lac	Sainte-Anne-du-Lac Water Aerodrome	PR		Air Tamarac	817 ft (249 m)		CSP9			46°52′55″N 75°19′18″W
Saint-Apollinaire	Saint-Apollinaire (Airpro) Aerodrome	PR		AirProGyro	380 ft (120 m)		CAA4			46°35′13″N 71°33′40″W
Saint-Augustin	Saint-Augustin Airport	PU		Transports Québec	19 ft (5.8 m)	CYIF		YIF		51°12′36″N 58°39′27″W
Saint-Augustin	Saint-Augustin Heliport	PU		Transports Québec	105 ft (32 m)		CTH9			51°13′25″N 58°38′34″W
Sainte-Barbe	Sainte-Barbe Heliport	PR		Chantel Lussier	150 ft (46 m)		CBB8			45°10′37″N 74°13′11″W
Saint-Basile	Saint-Basile (Marcotte) Aerodrome	PR		Denis Marcotte	300 ft (91 m)		CTR6			46°47′01″N 71°49′35″W
Saint-Boniface	Saint-Étienne-des-Grès/Hydravion Adventure Water Aerodrome	PU		Hydravion Adventure	90 ft (27 m)		CHA2			46°28′39″N 72°46′36″W
Saint-Bruno-de-Guigues	Saint-Bruno-de-Guigues Aerodrome	PU		Transports Québec	820 ft (250 m)		CTA4			47°26′57″N 79°25′05″W
Saint-Charles-de-Bourget	Saguenay/Saint-Charles-de-Bourget Water Aerodrome	PR		Michel Guay	230 ft (70 m)		CSA5			48°30′34″N 71°27′50″W
Saint-Cuthbert	Saint-Cuthbert (Ulm Québec) Aerodrome	PU		Ulm Québec Inc.	250 ft (76 m)		CCU2			46°10′26″N 73°16′44″W
Saint-David-de-Falardeau (Lac Sébastien)	Lac Sébastien Water Aerodrome	PR		Air Saguenay (1980) Inc, Martial Tremblay	580 ft (180 m)		CTD3			48°39′06″N 71°08′45″W
Saint-Dominique	Saint-Dominique Aerodrome	PR		Association Vol à voile Champlain Inc.	250 ft (76 m)		CSS4			45°37′57″N 72°49′08″W
Saint-Donat	Saint-Donat Aerodrome	PU		Municipalité de St-Donat	1,270 ft (390 m)		CSY4			46°18′21″N 74°10′53″W
Saint-Esprit	Saint-Esprit Aerodrome	PR		Parachute Montréal Rive Nord & Rive Sud	192 ft (59 m)		CES2			45°54′41″N 73°40′21″W
Saint-Félicien	Lac-Saint-Jean Aerodrome	PU		Aérodrome Lac-Saint-Jean	373 ft (114 m)	CYDO				48°46′43″N 72°22′30″W
Saint-Ferdinand	Saint-Ferdinand Aerodrome	PU		M Langlois	1,050 ft (320 m)		CSH5			46°07′35″N 71°32′11″W
Saint-Frédéric	Saint-Frédéric Aerodrome	PU		Grondair	991 ft (302 m)		CSZ4			46°19′53″N 70°57′39″W
Saint-Gabriel-de-Valcartier	CFB Valcartier (Valcartier (W/C J.H.L. (Joe) Lecomte) Heliport)	MI		DND	550 ft (170 m)	CYOY				48°54′10″N 71°30′13″W
Saint-Georges	Saint-Georges Aerodrome	PU	15	Aviation CMP	893 ft (272 m)	CYSG				46°05′47″N 70°42′52″W
Saint-Hyacinthe	Saint-Hyacinthe Aerodrome	PR		Aéroport de St-Hyacinthe	118 ft (36 m)		CSU3			45°36′18″N 73°00′51″W
Saint-Jean-Chrysostome	Saint-Jean-Chrysostome Aerodrome	PR		Aérodrome St-Jean Chrysostome	325 ft (99 m)		CSG5			46°41′07″N 71°09′06″W
Saint-Jean-sur-Richelieu	Saint-Jean Airport (Saint-Jean-sur-Richelieu Airport)	PU		Municipality of Saint-Jean	136 ft (41 m)	CYJN				45°17′40″N 73°16′52″W
Saint-Jérôme	Saint-Jérôme (Hydro-Québec) Heliport	PR		Hydro-Québec	358 ft (109 m)		CSZ6			45°46′16″N 74°01′37″W
Saint-Jovite	Mont-Tremblant/Saint-Jovite Airport	PR		Aéroport Mont-Tremblant Inc	790 ft (240 m)		CSZ3			46°09′15″N 74°35′01″W
Saint-Jovite	Mont-Tremblant/Saint-Jovite Héli-Tremblant Heliport	PR		Héli-Tremblant	803 ft (245 m)		CHT3			46°06′52″N 74°32′31″W
Saint-Lambert-de-Lauzon	Saint-Lambert-de-Lauzon Aerodrome	PR		L'Aéro-parc	475 ft (145 m)		CST7			46°33′37″N 71°10′57″W
Saint-Lazare	Montréal/Saint-Lazare Aerodrome	PU		6174892 Canada	175 ft (53 m)		CST3			45°23′33″N 74°08′03″W
Saint-Louis-de-France	Saint-Louis-de-France Aerodrome	PR		Martin Lemire, Janny Thibeau-Lévesque	225 ft (69 m)		CSJ5			46°26′12″N 72°37′49″W
Saint-Mathias-sur-Richelieu	Saint-Mathias Aerodrome	PU		Aviation B. L. Inc	50 ft (15 m)		CSP5			45°30′03″N 73°14′30″W
Saint-Mathias-sur-Richelieu	Saint-Mathias/Grant Aerodrome	PR		Grant Avn Enr	110 ft (34 m)		CSX5			45°28′19″N 73°11′58″W
Saint-Mathias-sur-Richelieu	Saint-Mathias Water Aerodrome	PU		Aviation B. L. Inc	25 ft (7.6 m)		CSV9			45°30′10″N 73°15′08″W
Saint-Mathieu-de-Beloeil	Saint-Mathieu-de-Beloeil Aerodrome	PU		Municipalité de Saint-Mathieu-de-Beloeil	49 ft (15 m)		CSB3			45°35′25″N 73°14′17″W
Saint-Mathieu-de-Laprairie	Saint-Mathieu-de-Laprairie Aerodrome	PR		Aerolane	155 ft (47 m)		CML8			45°18′40″N 73°33′55″W
Saint-Michel	Saint-Michel Heliport	PR		Chantel Lussier	220 ft (67 m)		CML9			45°15′18″N 73°33′03″W
Saint-Michel-des-Saints	Saint-Michel-des-Saints Aerodrome	PU		Municipalité de Saint-Michel-des-Saints	1,372 ft (418 m)		CSM5			46°40′51″N 73°59′37″W
Saint-Michel-des-Saints	Saint-Michel-des-Saints/Lac Kaiagamac Water Aerodrome	PR		Rock Martel	1,190 ft (360 m)		CLK4			46°39′04″N 73°53′39″W
Saint-Michel-des-Saints	Saint-Michel-des-Saints/Port Saint Michel Water Aerodrome	PR		Port Saint Michel	1,180 ft (360 m)		CMS3			46°41′24″N 73°53′55″W
Saint-Raymond	Saint-Raymond/Paquet Aerodrome	PR		Club de vol à voile de Québec Inc	582 ft (177 m)		CSK5			46°53′42″N 71°47′09″W
Saint-Remi-d'Amherst	Saint-Remi-d'Amherst/Kanata Tremblant Resort Heliport	PR		Air Kanata	950 ft (290 m)		CKT6			45°59′30″N 74°44′59″W
Saint-Thomas	Joliette/Saint-Thomas Aerodrome	PU		Robert Cotė	100 ft (30 m)		CJO2			46°00′26″N 73°22′58″W
Sainte-Veronique	Sainte-Véronique Water Aerodrome	PR		Air Mt-Laurier	823 ft (251 m)		CSW9			46°30′56″N 74°59′19″W
Saint-Victor	Saint-Victor-de-Beauce Aerodrome	PR		Club Aéronautique Doyon Inc	1,100 ft (340 m)		CSL5			46°07′06″N 70°53′21″W
Salaberry-de-Valleyfield	Salaberry-de-Valleyfield Aerodrome	PU		Aéro-club de Valleyfield	155 ft (47 m)		CSD3			45°12′30″N 74°08′29″W
Salluit	Salluit Airport	PU		Administration régionale Kativik	745 ft (227 m)	CYZG		YZG		62°10′46″N 75°40′02″W
Schefferville	Schefferville Airport	PU		Société aéroportuaire de Schefferville	1,709 ft (521 m)	CYKL		YKL		54°48′19″N 66°48′19″W
Schefferville	Schefferville/Squaw Lake Water Aerodrome	PR		Norpaq Aviation	1,616 ft (493 m)		CSZ9			54°49′41″N 66°48′05″W
Sept-Îles	Sept-Îles Airport	PU	15	Transport Canada	180 ft (55 m)	CYZV		YZV		50°13′24″N 66°15′56″W
Sept-Îles	Sept-Îles/Héli-Boréal Heliport	PR		Héli-Boréal	218 ft (66 m)		CHB4			50°17′25″N 66°24′44″W
Sept-Îles	Sept-Îles (H, Stever) Heliport	PR		Harvey Stever	125 ft (38 m)		CHS2			50°12′40″N 66°17′05″W
Sept-Îles	Sept-Îles (Hydro-Québec) Heliport	PR		Hydro-Québec	220 ft (67 m)		CTA2			50°17′17″N 66°24′33″W
Sept-Îles	Sept-Îles/Lac Rapides Water Aerodrome	PU / PR	15/SEA	Air Tunilik, Bruno Riou, Daniel Desbiens	255 ft (78 m)		CSM8			50°17′56″N 66°24′56″W
Sept-Îles	Sept-Îles/Mustang Helicopters Heliport	PR		Mustang Helicopters	215 ft (66 m)		CHE3			50°17′20″N 66°24′44″W
Shefford	Shefford Heliport	PR		Denis Charest	721 ft (220 m)		CSC4			45°20′09″N 72°35′37″W
Sherbrooke	Sherbrooke Airport	PU	30	Corporation de Développement de l'Aéroport de Sherbrooke (CDAS)	792 ft (241 m)	CYSC		YSC		45°26′19″N 71°41′29″W
Sherbrooke	Sherbrooke (CHUS)/François Desourdy Heliport	PR		Centre hospitalier universitaire de Sherbrooke	722 ft (220 m)		CSG7			45°26′52″N 71°52′17″W
Sorel-Tracy	Sorel Airport	PU		Gestion Aéroportuaire de Sorel	76 ft (23 m)		CSY3			45°58′49″N 73°02′32″W
Stanstead	Stanstead/Weller Airport	PR		G. Weller	1,250 ft (380 m)		CTQ2			45°02′04″N 72°02′06″W
Tasiujaq	Tasiujaq Airport	PU		Administration régionale Kativik	121 ft (37 m)	CYTQ		YTQ		58°40′04″N 69°57′21″W
Témiscouata-sur-le-Lac	Témiscouata-sur-le-Lac Water Aerodrome	PR		Joselito Fournier	500 ft (150 m)		CTM8			47°41′05″N 68°52′31″W
Tête-à-la-Baleine	Tête-à-la-Baleine Airport	PU		Transports Québec	112 ft (34 m)		CTB6	ZTB		50°40′28″N 59°23′01″W
Thetford Mines	Thetford Mines Airport	PU		Grondair Aviation	1,408 ft (429 m)		CSM3			46°03′06″N 71°15′26″W
Thetford Mines (Lac Bécancour)	Thetford Mines/Lac Bécancour Water Aerodrome	PR		François Genest	1,312 ft (400 m)		CLB4			46°04′20″N 71°14′56″W
Trois-Rivières	Trois-Rivières Airport	PU	15	Airport	199 ft (61 m)	CYRQ		YRQ		46°21′10″N 72°40′46″W
Umiujaq	Umiujaq Airport	PU		Administration régionale Kativik	251 ft (77 m)	CYMU		YUD		56°32′10″N 76°31′06″W
Val-d'Or	Val-d'Or Airport	PU		Aéroport régional de Val-d'Or	1,105 ft (337 m)	CYVO		YVO		48°03′12″N 77°46′58″W
Val-d'Or	Val-d'Or (Huard) Water Aerodrome	PR		Rock Huard	1,000 ft (300 m)		CVB6			48°04′21″N 77°52′27″W
Val-d'Or	Val-d'Or/Lac Stabell Water Aerodrome	PR		Denis Mainville	980 ft (300 m)		CLS2			48°07′08″N 77°48′36″W
Val-d'Or	Val-d'Or/Rivière Piché Water Aerodrome	PR		Marc Lafleur & Marie-Claude Bruneau	1,000 ft (300 m)		CTA5			48°05′07″N 77°53′19″W
Val-d'Or	Val-d'Or (St-Pierre) Heliport	PR		Jean-Guy St-Pierre	1,000 ft (300 m)		COR2			48°04′39″N 77°52′07″W
Val-d'Or	Val-d'Or (St-Pierre) Water Aerodrome	PR		Jean-Guy St-Pierre	1,000 ft (300 m)		CSP7			48°04′39″N 77°52′07″W
Valcourt	Valcourt Airport	PU		Aero Club de Valcourt	740 ft (230 m)		CSQ3			45°28′52″N 72°18′37″W
Victoriaville	Victoriaville Airport	PU	CANPASS	Corporation Initiative Industrielle	487 ft (148 m)		CSR3			46°06′39″N 71°55′54″W
Waskaganish	Waskaganish Airport	PU		Transport Canada	79 ft (24 m)	CYKQ		YKQ		51°28′24″N 78°45′30″W
Wemindji	Wemindji Airport	PU		Transport Canada	66 ft (20 m)	CYNC		YNC		53°00′38″N 78°49′52″W
Wemotaci	Weymontachie Airport	PU		Counseil de Bande de Weymontachie	1,171 ft (357 m)		CSU5			47°56′13″N 73°49′02″W

== Defunct airports ==
Community	Airport name	ICAO	TC LID	IATA	Coordinates
Aguanish	Aguanish Water Aerodrome		CTQ3		50°13′50″N 062°06′45″W
Amos	Amos (Lac Figuery) Water Aerodrome		CSC6		48°29′59″N 078°07′04″W
Baie-Comeau	Baie-Comeau Water Aerodrome		CSD6		49°12′15″N 68°20′26″W
Baie-Johan-Beetz	Baie-Johan-Beetz Seaplane Base			YBJ	50°17′01″N 062°48′37″W
Blue Sea Lake	Blue Sea Lake (Outaouais Aviation) Water Aerodrome		CBS6		46°11′47″N 76°03′28″W
Boucherville	Montréal/Boucherville Water Aerodrome		CTA7		45°37′40″N 073°27′17″W
Caniapiscau	Caniapiscau Aerodrome		CCP6		54°50′16″N 069°53′34″W
Chambly	Chambly Airport		CTT2		45°24′04″N 073°17′43″W
Chibougamau	Chibougamau/Lac Caché Water Aerodrome		CSZ7		49°49′23″N 074°25′33″W
Gatineau	Ottawa/Gatineau Water Aerodrome (CANPASS (SEA))		CTI3		45°27′52″N 75°40′48″W
Kegashka	Kegaska Airport		CTK6		50°11′45″N 61°15′57″W
L'Assomption	L'Assomption Airport		CLA2		45°49′23″N 073°27′38″W
Lac à la Perchaude	Lac à la Perchaude Airport		CTE5		46°37′21″N 072°50′45″W
Lac Beauregard	Lac Beauregard Water Aerodrome		CTN3		46°57′11″N 74°53′32″W
Lac Gagnon	Lac Gagnon Water Aerodrome		CTU4	YGA	46°07′03″N 075°06′55″W
Lac Gobeil	Lac Gobeil Water Aerodrome		CCG2		48°14′30″N 069°38′50″W
Lac Jean-Péré	Parc de la Vérendrye (Le Domaine) Water Aerodrome		CSB9		47°02′12″N 076°32′12″W
Lac Kaiagamac	Lac Kaiagamac Water Aerodrome		CSF8		46°39′06″N 073°53′42″W
Lac Sept-Îles	Lac Sept-Îles Water Aerodrome		CSP8		46°56′23″N 071°44′42″W
Lac-des-Îles	Lac-des-Îles Water Aerodrome		CSA9		46°24′43″N 075°31′12″W
La Grande-4 generating station	La Grande-4/Lac de la Falaise Water Aerodrome		CLB6		53°42′34″N 73°43′15″W
Lennoxville	Lennoxville (Airview) Airport		CTQ4		45°21′12″N 071°51′45″W
Les Cèdres	Montréal/Les Cèdres Airport		CSS3		45°20′51″N 074°04′36″W
Maniwaki	Maniwaki/Blue Sea Lake Water Aerodrome		CSM6		46°14′32″N 076°02′54″W
Mansonville	Mansonville Airport		CSK4		45°01′35″N 72°24′07″W
Mascouche	Montréal/Mascouche Airport		CSK3		45°43′07″N 073°35′53″W
Matagami	Matagami Water Aerodrome		CSW8		49°44′04″N 077°37′11″W
Matoush Uranium Mine	Matoush Aerodrome		CRS7		51°54′18″N 072°07′26″W
Mont-Tremblant	Mont-Tremblant/Lac Duhamel Water Aerodrome		CSE8		46°08′27″N 074°38′30″W
Mont-Tremblant	Mont-Tremblant/Lac Ouimet Water Aerodrome		CST9		46°09′42″N 074°35′11″W
Longueuil	Montréal/Hydro Aéroport de Montréal Water Airport		CHA3		45°32′40″N 73°30′55″W
Montreal	Montréal/Marina Venise Water Airport		CST8		45°37′59″N 073°46′59″W
Montreal	CFB St. Hubert				45°30′47″N 073°25′20″W
Montreal	Victoria STOLport				45°28′57″N 073°32′55″W
Opinaca River	Opinaca Aerodrome		CPN8		52°13′19″N 076°36′45″W
Parent	Parent Water Aerodrome		CSE9		47°53′31″N 74°38′26″W
Passes-Dangereuses	Chutes-des-Passes/Lac Margane Water Aerodrome		CTM3	YWQ	49°56′42″N 71°08′10″W
Pontiac	Pontiac Airpark		CPN2		45°31′39″N 076°10′09″W
Pontiac	Pontiac Airpark Water Aerodrome		CPC7		45°31′25″N 076°10′15″W
Richelieu	Richelieu Airport		CSX3		45°26′52″N 73°14′03″W
Richelieu	Richelieu/Messier Aerodrome		CRM3		45°22′41″N 73°13′37″W
Roberval	Roberval (Air Saguenay) Water Aerodrome		CAS8		48°31′33″N 072°13′15″W
Saint Helen's Island	Montréal/Île Sainte-Hélène Water Airport		CVP2		45°31′15″N 073°32′20″W
Saint-Anselme	Saint-Anselme Aerodrome		CTQ6		46°37′19″N 70°57′18″W
Saint-Jérôme	Saint-Jérôme Aerodrome		CSN3		45°46′49″N 74°03′43″W
Saint-Laurent	Cartierville Airport	CYCV		YCV	45°31′00″N 073°43′00″W
Saint-Maurice River	Rivière Saint-Maurice (Aviation Maurice) Water Aerodrome		CMA3		46°39′10″N 072°42′24″W
Saint-Michel-de-Napierville	Saint-Michel-de-Napierville Aerodrome		CMN3		45°12′49″N 73°34′33″W
Sainte-Agnès-De-Dundee	Sainte-Agnès-de-Dundee Aerodrome		CDD3		45°02′51″N 074°20′36″W
Sainte-Foy	Aérodrome Saint-Louis				46°46′19″N 071°16′56″W
Sainte-Julienne	Sainte-Julienne Aerodrome		CSM4		45°56′27″N 073°43′26″W
Sainte-Lucie-de-Beauregard	Sainte-Lucie-de-Beauregard Aerodrome		CSU4		46°44′27″N 070°01′57″W
Senneterre	Senneterre Airport		CTK2		48°20′26″N 077°10′52″W
Stanhope	Stanhope Airport		CSN5		45°00′56″N 071°47′40″W
Temiscamie River	Rivière Témiscamie (Air Roberval Ltée) Aerodrome		CRT2		51°00′31″N 72°59′00″W
Temiscamie River	Rivière Témiscamie Water Aerodrome		CSV7		51°00′31″N 72°59′23″W
Témiscaming	Témiscaming/Lac Kipawa Water Aerodrome		CSG8		46°46′40″N 078°58′17″W

== See also ==
- List of airports in the Montreal area
