= Aeropro =

Airline in Canada

IATA	ICAO	Call sign
–	APO	AEROPRO
- Founded: 1988
- Ceased operations: 2010 (as an airline)
- Hubs: Québec City Jean Lesage International Airport
- Fleet size: 14, 15
- Parent company: 2553-4330 Quebec Inc
- Headquarters: Quebec City, Quebec, Canada
- Website: www.aeropro.qc.ca

Aéropro was an air charter, aircraft maintenance and airport management company with its headquarters on the grounds of Québec City Jean Lesage International Airport in Sainte-Foy, Quebec City, Quebec, Canada. It conducted business charters and recreational and sightseeing flights across the province of Quebec. Its main base is located at Québec City Jean Lesage International Airport. The company manages several airports in Quebec.

== Grounding ==
As of August 1, 2010 Transport Canada effectively grounded all air operations by revoking Aeropro's operating permit following an audit that found repeated violations of Canadian aviation regulations. A previous day, Transport Canada was cited to 2553–4330 Quebec Inc – the parent company of Aeropro – to a hearing and found guilty of neglect in the maintenance of its aircraft. Transport Canada conducted a thorough investigation of the entire company that included a risk assessment and employee interviews. Transport Canada found significant shortcomings with respect to management, air operations and training. "A certificate cancellation is a rare and unusual measure that is not imposed lightly."

According to theCanadian Press, on August 1, 2010, AeroPro had its operating permit revoked by Transport Canada. Transport Canada's decision was upheld on July 31, 2010, by a judge who turned down AeroPro's request for an injunction against Transport Canada. Aeropro ceased operations definitive August 2, 2010, and the company was dissolved the next day. Aeropro stopped paying its workers at 3 pm of August 1. 2553–4330 Quebec Inc was forced to close operations by Transport Canada due to flaws found in the aircraft maintenance. 2553–4330 Quebec Inc stopped paying its workers at 5 pm of August 2, closed operations on August 4 and dissolved the next day.

== History ==
Aeropro was founded in 1988. The company had more than 200 employees.

== Fleet ==
As of June 2010 the following aircraft are in the Aeropro fleet. Not included but still listed by Transport Canada aircraft listing is a King Air registration C-FGIN that crashed on June 23, 2010.

Aeropro
Aircraft	No. of Aircraft (Aeropro list)	No. of Aircraft (TC list)	Variants	Notes
Beechcraft King Air	4	4	65-A90, A100	An addition one is still listed with Transport Canada although the aircraft was destroyed. See Accidents
Embraer EMB 110 Bandeirante	2	2	110P1	
Piper PA-31 Navajo	8	8	PA-31, PA-31-350	

== Airports ==
According to Aeropro it manages the operations of the following airports in Quebec (as of June 2010):

- Bonaventure Airport
- Michel-Pouliot Gaspé Airport
- Îles-de-la-Madeleine Airport
- Rivière-du-Loup Airport
- Sherbrooke Airport
- Trois-Rivières Airport

According to Nav Canada Aeropro operates the following airports in Quebec (as of June 2010):

- Havre Saint-Pierre Airport
- Rivière-du-Loup Airport
- Sherbrooke Airport

== Sightseeing flights ==
From late June until the end of August Aeropro operates a once a week flight from Sept-Îles Airport to Îles-de-la-Madeleine Airport. Also from early July to the end of August Aeropro operates a once a week flight from Sept-Îles Airport to Port-Menier Airport on Anticosti Island.

== Accidents ==
At 6 am on June 23, 2010 an Aeropro Beechcraft A100 King Air took off from Jean Lesage International Airport with five passengers and a crew of two on board. Shortly after departure the pilot reported engine problems and said he would return to the airport. However the aircraft crashed in a field about 2 km (1.2 mi) away from the airport. All seven occupants were killed and the aircraft was destroyed by fire.

Aeropro maintenance is still open as of this day 18 November 2014. The flight operation were closed and are operating under another name, but maintenance is still Aeropro in Québec city.
