= YLS =

YLS may refer to:

- Yale Law School, United States
- Lebel-sur-Quévillon Airport, Quebec, Canada, IATA code YLS
