= CMA3 =

CMA3 may refer to:

- Rivière Saint-Maurice (Aviation Maurice) Water Aerodrome, a defunct Canadian aerodrome
- CMA 3 (climate conference), 2021 United Nations Climate Change Conference
