= 2016 Magdalen Islands Mitsubishi MU-2 crash =

2016 plane crash in Canada

2016 Magdalen Islands MU-2 crash
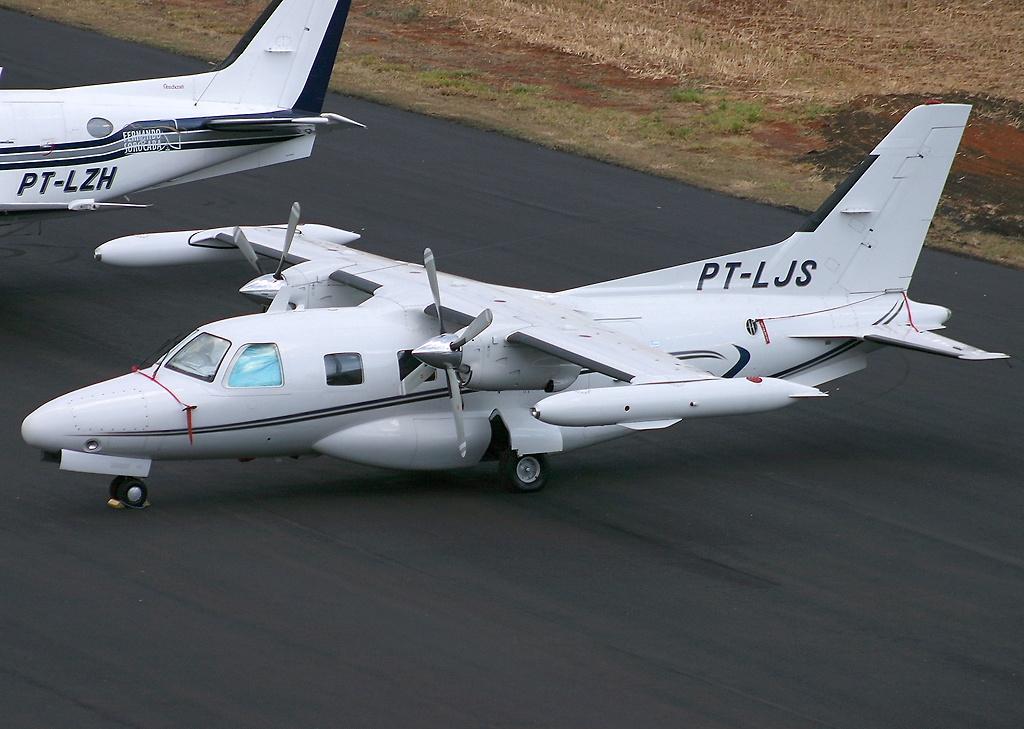
- PT-LJS, similar to N246W

Accident
- Date: 29 March 2016
- Summary: Crashed following unstabilized approach
- Site: Les Îles-de-la-Madeleine, Quebec, Canada; 47.4026°N 61.8167°W

Aircraft
- Aircraft type: Mitsubishi MU-2B-60
- Operator: Aero Teknic
- Registration: N246W
- Flight origin: Montreal Saint-Hubert Longueuil Airport, St-Hubert, Quebec
- Destination: Îles-de-la-Madeleine Airport, Magdalen Islands, Quebec
- Occupants: 7
- Passengers: 5
- Crew: 2
- Fatalities: 7
- Survivors: 0

On 29 March 2016, a Mitsubishi MU-2 operated by Aero Teknic, a Canadian aircraft maintenance company, crashed on approach to Îles-de-la-Madeleine Airport, killing former Canadian politician Jean Lapierre, four members of his family, and the two pilots. Lapierre was flying to his father's funeral with his wife and three siblings. One passenger initially survived the crash, but died of a heart attack after being pulled from the wreckage.

== Accident ==
Before departure, Jean Lapierre mentioned that he was concerned about flying during bad weather. The aircraft left Montreal Saint-Hubert Longueuil Airport in Saint-Hubert, Quebec at 0931 Eastern Daylight Time and was headed to Îles-de-la-Madeleine Airport, on Havre-aux-Maisons island in the Magdalen Islands in Quebec. A little over two hours later, at 1230 Atlantic Daylight Time, the aircraft collided with terrain in Les Îles-de-la-Madeleine, Quebec, about 1.4 nmi (2.6 km) short of the threshold of runway 07.

At the time of the accident, there was light rain and mist. The visibility was 2 mi (3.2 km) with a cloud ceiling of 200 ft (61 m). The air temperature was 0 °C (32 °F) with east-northeast winds at 18 knots (33 km/h) per hour, gusting to 24 knots (44 km/h).

== Investigation ==
The Transportation Safety Board of Canada (TSB) opened an investigation and sent a group of investigators to the site.

According to the preliminary observations found by the investigators, the aircraft was in a slightly left-wing-low-and-nose-high attitude on impact. The wreckage was contained in a field 150 m^{2} (1,600 sq ft) about 2 km (1.2 mi) southwest of Îles-de-la-Madeleine Airport; the aircraft had hit the ground and slid for 91 m (299 ft) before coming to a stop. Examination of the wreckage showed the engines were running until the impact with the ground. The MU-2 was not fitted with flight recorders (which are not required for light aircraft), but a different type of onboard recording device was installed and it appeared to be intact. The wreckage was removed from the crash site and transported to the TSB's laboratory in Ottawa on April 6. The U.S. National Transportation Safety Board sent a representative to the American-built plane's crash site. Mitsubishi also sent investigators to the site.

=== Causes ===
On 10 January 2018, the Transportation Safety Board of Canada (TSB) released their final report in which they stated that the accident was caused by the pilot's inability to maintain a stable landing approach. The pilot increased power at low altitude with low airspeed, but lost control, and the plane rolled right and descended rapidly. The pilot was able to level the wings, but his actions were too late to prevent impact with the ground.

The investigation also found the pilot's high workload to be a contributing factor. It concluded that the high workload decreased his situational awareness and hindered the decision-making process. Furthermore, the investigation found it probable that the pilot's flight skills and procedures were insufficient for the pilot in command of operations on the aircraft type, especially in a situation similar to that experienced in this accident.

== Victims ==
The victims include the two pilots, Captain Pascal Gosselin and co-pilot Fabrice Labourel. Jean Lapierre, his wife, his two brothers and one of his two sisters were also killed.

Jean Lapierre was a former Canadian Federal Member of Parliament and former Minister of Transport in Prime Minister Paul Martin's cabinet. He was Paul Martin's Quebec lieutenant during Martin's time as prime minister, and a member of the Liberal party. Lapierre eventually became a well-known Quebec broadcaster and talk-show host.

Canadian prime minister Justin Trudeau, former prime minister Paul Martin, and Montreal mayor Denis Coderre all expressed their sadness at Lapierre's death. The funeral of Lapierre and his wife was held on April 16 at the St. Viateur Church, Outremont and was attended by Prime Minister Justin Trudeau and his wife.
