= Pascan Aviation =

Regional airline based in Longueuil, Quebec, Canada

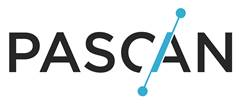

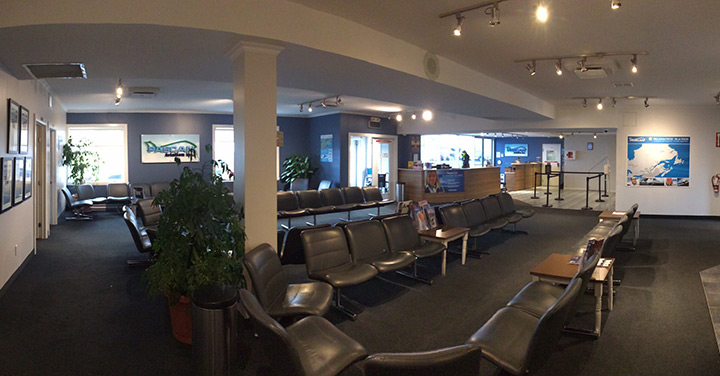
- Pascan Aviation's fixed-base operator lounge in Montreal Metropolitan Airport
IATA	ICAO	Call sign
P6	PSC	PASCAN
- Founded: 1999
- AOC #: Canada: 18611; United States: 95NF551F
- Hubs: Montreal Metropolitan Airport
- Fleet size: 12
- Destinations: 10
- Parent company: Pascan Aviation, Inc.
- Headquarters: Longueuil, Quebec, Canada
- Key people: Julian Roberts, General Manager
- Website: www.pascan.com

9736140 Canada Inc., operating as Pascan Aviation, is a regional airline based in Longueuil, Quebec, Canada. Based at Montreal Metropolitan Airport in the Saint-Hubert borough of Longueuil, Pascan operates scheduled flights within Quebec and Atlantic Canada as well as charter services. Its main base is at Montreal Metropolitan Airport, formerly Montreal Saint-Hubert Longueuil Airport, and it runs a fixed-base operator at the airport.

== History ==
The airline was established in 1999 by Serge Charron. Since then, the company has established itself as an independent regional airline in Quebec and claims to be the largest in the province. Pascan connects eight destinations throughout Quebec and Atlantic Canada.

== Destinations ==
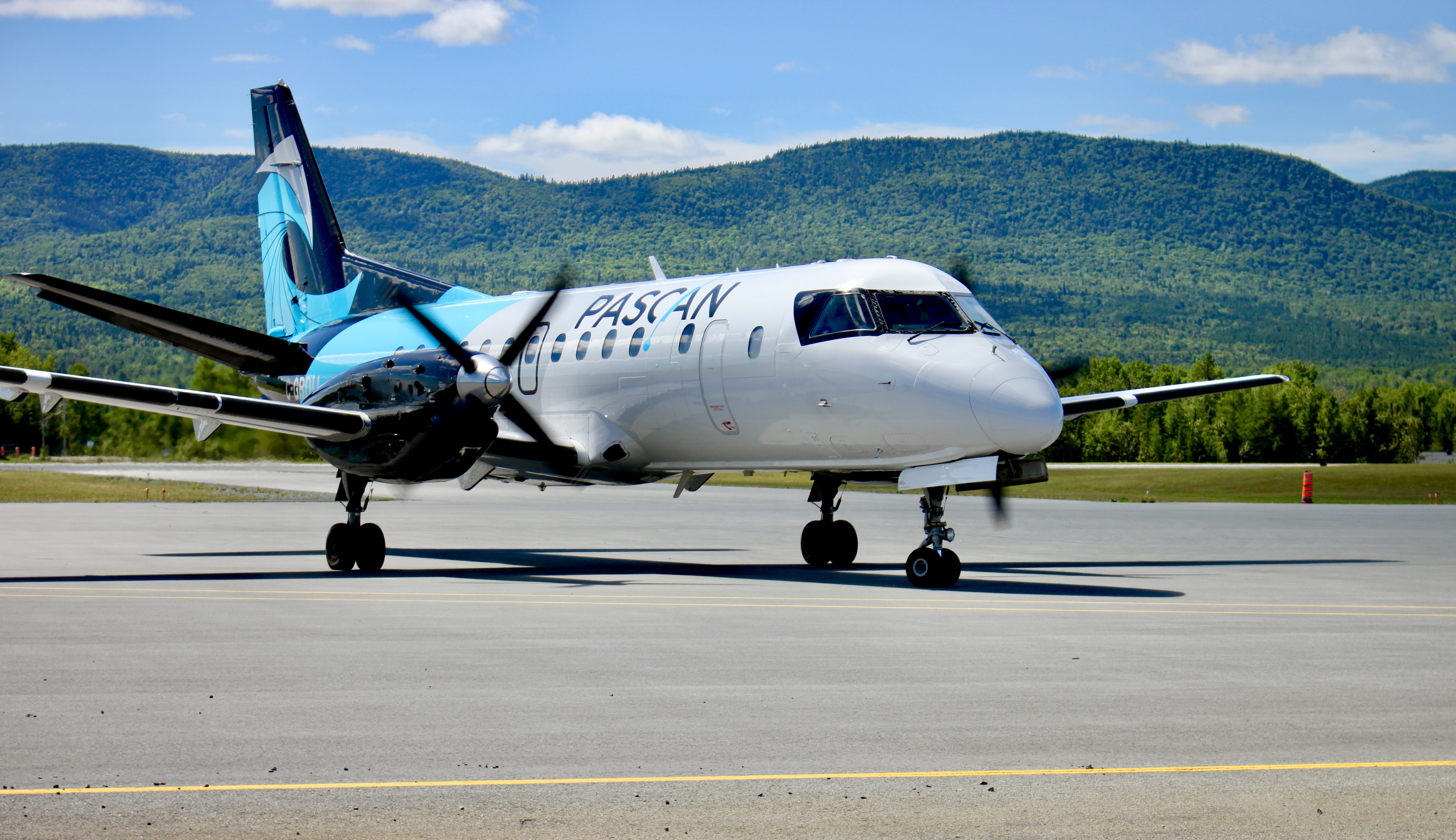
Pascan Saab 340B (C-GRDU) arriving at Gaspé Michel Pouliot Airport (YGP)

As of July 2026, Pascan Aviation operates services to the following domestic scheduled destinations:

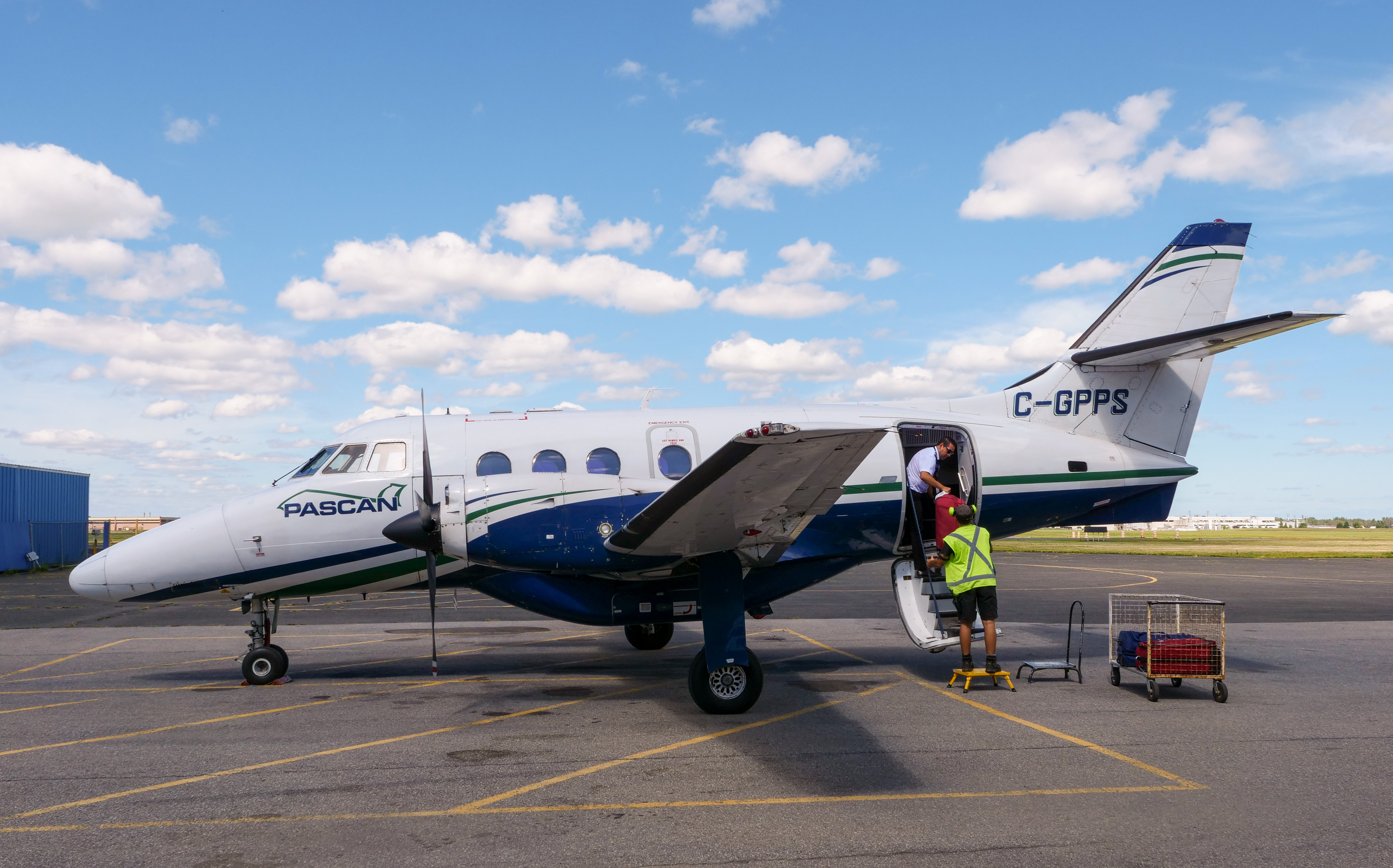
Pascan Bae Jetstream 32 at Montreal Metropolitan Airport

Province	City	Airport	Notes
Quebec	Bonaventure	Bonaventure Airport	
Quebec	Gaspé	Michel-Pouliot Gaspé Airport	
Quebec	Les Îles-de-la-Madeleine	Îles-de-la-Madeleine Airport	
Quebec	Saint-Hubert	Montreal Metropolitan Airport	Hub
Quebec	Quebec City	Québec City Jean Lesage International Airport	
New Brunswick	Saint John	Saint John Airport	

== Fleet ==
As of 30 July 2026, Transport Canada shows 12 registered aircraft:

Pascan Aviation fleet
Aircraft	No. of aircraft	Variants	Notes
British Aerospace Jetstream	3	Model 3212	Combi aircraft, can carry up to 16 passengers.
Saab 340	9	340B	Combi aircraft, Can carry up to 33 passengers.
Total	12		

=== Former fleet ===
Former aircraft operated by Pascan Aviation, Pascan Express, and 9736140 Canada Inc. not listed above:

- ATR 42
- Beechcraft King Air
- Piper PA-31 Navajo
- Pilatus PC-12
