= Mitsubishi MU-2 =

Utility transport aircraft

MU-2
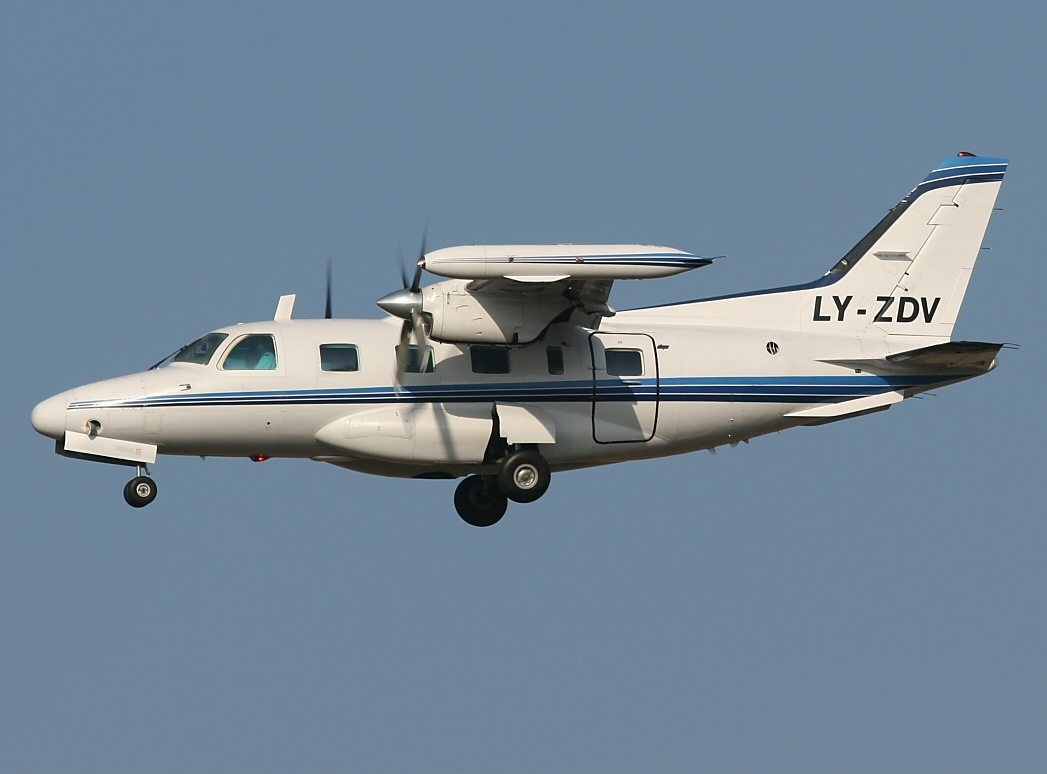
- MU-2B-60 Marquise

General information
- Type: Utility transport aircraft
- National origin: Japan
- Manufacturer: Mitsubishi Heavy Industries
- Status: In service
- Number built: 704

History
- Manufactured: 1963–1986
- First flight: 14 September 1963

The Mitsubishi MU-2 is a Japanese high-wing, twin-engined, turboprop aircraft with a pressurized cabin manufactured by Mitsubishi Heavy Industries. It made its maiden flight in September 1963 and was produced until 1986. It is one of postwar Japan's most successful aircraft, with 704 manufactured in Japan and San Angelo, Texas, in the United States.

== Design and development ==
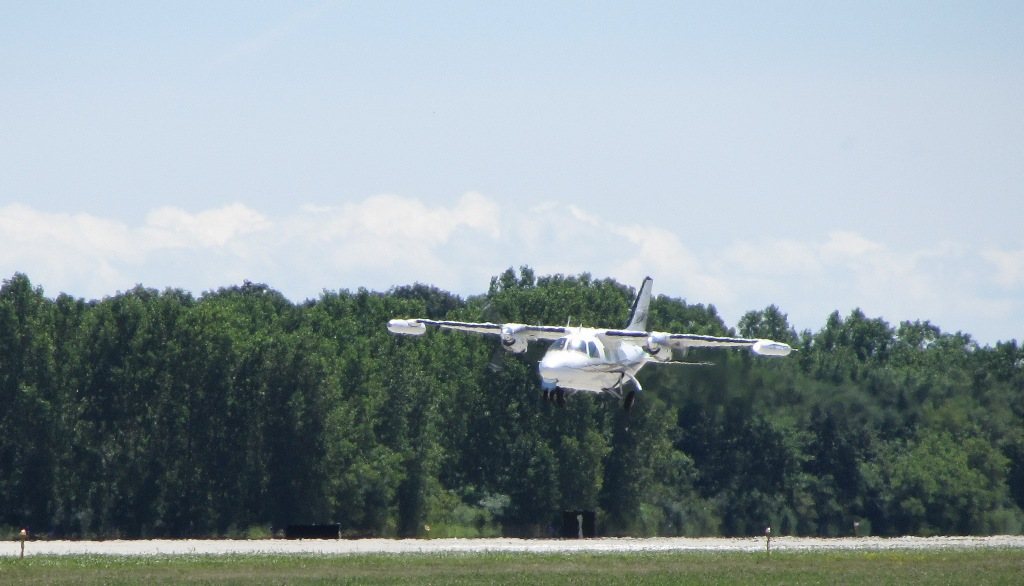
MU-2 landing

Work on the MU-2, Mitsubishi's first postwar aircraft design, began in 1959. Designed as a light twin turboprop transport suitable for a variety of civil and military roles, the MU-2 first flew on 14 September 1963. This first MU-2, and the three MU-2As built, were powered by the Turbomeca Astazou turboprop.

Civil MU-2s powered by Garrett engines were certified as variants of the MU-2B, using the MU-2B type followed by a number. For marketing purposes, each variant was given a suffix letter; the MU-2B-10, for example, was sold as the MU-2D, while the MU-2B-36A was marketed as the MU-2N.

The MU-2 has a high cruise speed coupled with a low landing speed. This is accomplished by using over-wing spoilers instead of conventional ailerons for roll control, allowing the use of full-span, double-slotted flaps on the trailing edge of the wing; the very large flaps give the MU-2 wing loading comparable to a Beechcraft King Air in landing configuration, while having wing loading comparable to a light jet in cruise. The spoilers are highly effective, even when the MU-2 wing is stalled, and the lack of ailerons eliminates adverse yaw.

=== Production ===
In 1963, Mitsubishi granted Mooney Aircraft rights in North America to assemble, sell, and support the MU-2. In 1965, Mooney established a facility to assemble MU-2s at its new factory in San Angelo, Texas. Major components were shipped from Japan, and the San Angelo factory installed engines, avionics, and interiors, then painted, flight tested, and delivered the completed aircraft to customers. By 1969, Mooney was in financial difficulty, and the San Angelo facility was taken over by Mitsubishi. Production in the United States ended in 1986. The last Japanese-built aircraft was completed in January 1987.

The subsequent production aircraft, designated MU-2B, were delivered with the Garrett TPE331 engines that remained standard on all later models. Thirty-four MU-2Bs were built, followed by 18 examples of the similar MU-2D. The Japanese armed forces purchased four unpressurized MU-2Cs and 16 search-and-rescue variants designated MU-2E. Featuring slightly more powerful, upgraded TPE331 engines, 95 examples of the MU-2F were sold.

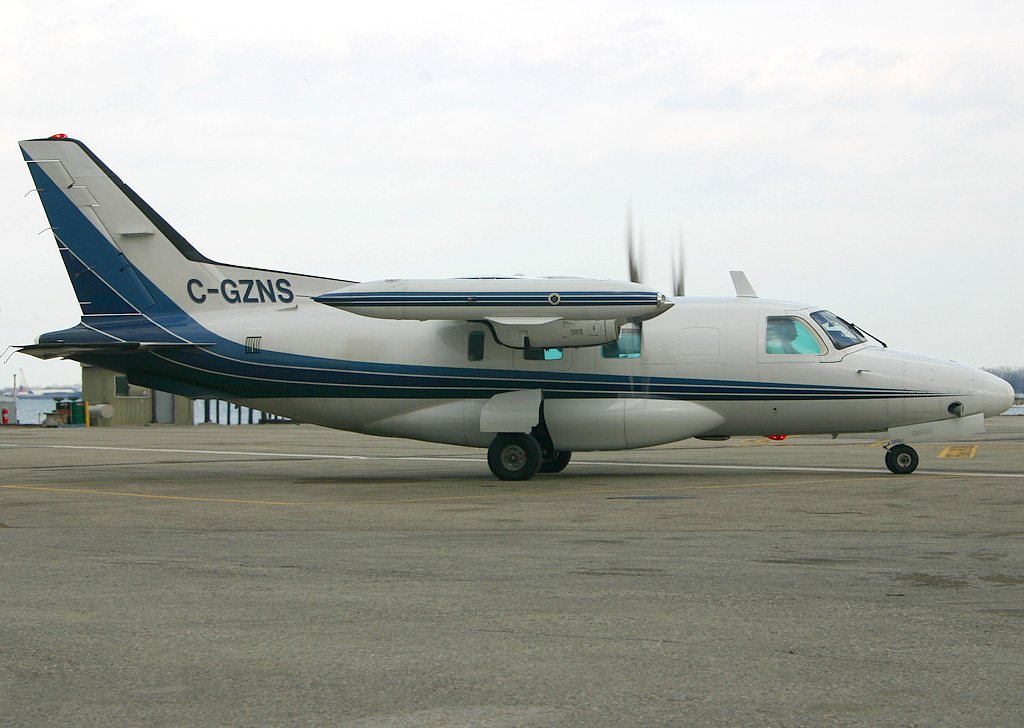
A stretched-fuselage Mitsubishi MU-2 Marquise taxiing at the Toronto City Centre Airport: This MU-2 is operated in a medivac configuration by Thunder Airlines of Thunder Bay, Canada.

Beginning with the MU-2G, the fuselage was stretched. The MU-2M, of which only 28 were built, is regarded as the toughest and most desired of all short-bodied MU-2s, especially with a −10 engine conversion. It had a short fuselage and the same engines as the MU-2K and stretched MU-2J, and had an increase in cabin pressurization to 6.0 psi; it was followed by the MU-2P, which had newer, four-blade propellers. The final short-fuselage MU-2s produced were known as Solitaires and were fitted with 496 kW (665 shp) Garrett TPE331-10-501M engines.

The first significant change to the airframe came with the stretched MU-2G, first flying 10 January 1969, which featured a 1.91 m (6 ft 3 in) longer fuselage than earlier models; 46 were built before being succeeded by the more powerful MU-2J (108 constructed). The MU-2L (29 built) was a higher-gross-weight variant, followed by the MU-2N (39 built) with uprated engines and four-blade propellers. The final stretched-fuselage MU-2 was named the Marquise, and like the Solitaire, used 533 kW (715 shp) TPE331 engines.

== Operational history ==
=== Military service ===
==== Japan ====
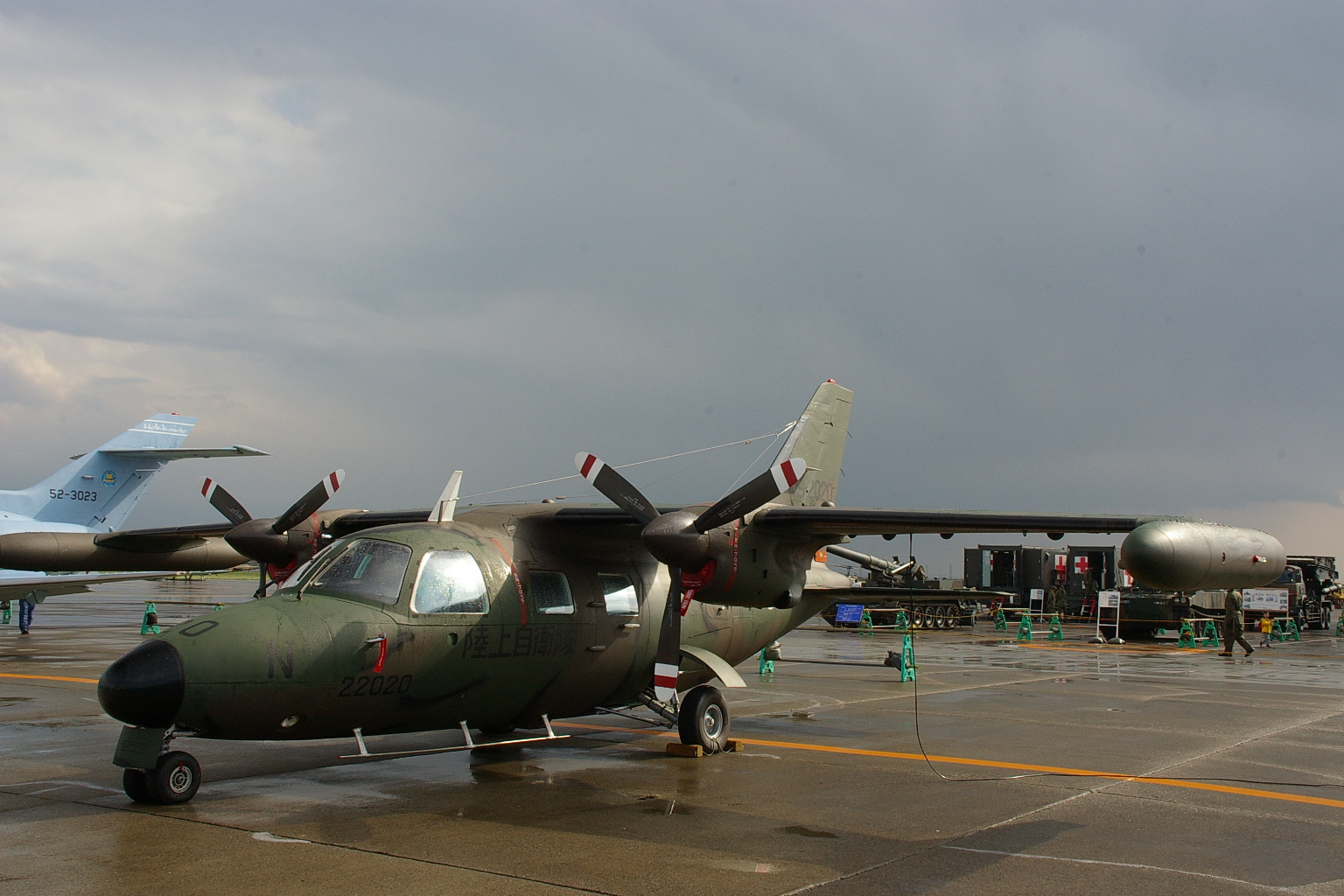
A military version for JGSDF.

The Japan Self-Defense Forces are the only military operators to have flown the MU-2 in front-line service.

===== Ground Self-Defense Force =====
The four C-model aircraft built, in addition to 16 MU-2Ks, entered service with the Japan Ground Self-Defense Force (JGSDF) with the designation LR-1; they were used as liaison and photo-reconnaissance aircraft. They were retired in 2016. A number of them have been placed as gate guardians at JGSDF bases.

===== Air Self-Defense Force =====
Twenty-nine MU-2Es were purchased by the Japan Air Self-Defense Forces as search-and-rescue aircraft and designated MU-2S. Additional equipment consisted of a "thimble" nose radome, increased fuel capacity, bulged observation windows, and a sliding door for dropping rafts. They were replaced in 2008 by the British Aerospace U-125A. Some have been preserved.

==== Argentina ====
Four civilian MU-2 (LV-MCV, LV-MOP, LV-OAN, and LV-ODZ) were acquired by the Argentine Air Force during the Falkland War. These Mitsubishis were unarmed, but used during combat operations by the Escuadrón Fénix as pathfinders, reconnaissance, and communications-relay planes. One of their missions was flying as guiding planes to the IA-58 Pucará replacements required after losses on the raid on Pebble Island.

==== New Zealand ====
In late 2009, the Royal New Zealand Air Force (RNZAF) took delivery of four Mitsubishi MU-2F fixed-wing training aircraft from the United States for use as training aids. In New Zealand service, they are known as the Mitsubishi MU-2 Sumo. The aircraft were ferried to New Zealand and are located at the RNZAF's Ground Training Wing (GTW) at RNZAF Base Woodbourne near Blenheim in New Zealand's South Island.

==== United States ====
Since 1987, MU-2s have been flown by retired United States Air Force (USAF) pilots working under government contract at Tyndall Air Force Base, Florida, where they provide USAF undergraduate air battle manager students of the USAF Weapons Controller School with their initial experience controlling live aircraft. In the tactical simulations, the aircraft usually represent F-15s and Mikoyan MiG-29s. Students must control eight MU-2 missions before they can progress to controlling high-performance aircraft such as F-15s or F-22s.

=== Flight around the world ===
On 25 August 2013, Mike Laver, owner and pilot of N50ET (a −10 engine converted 1974 K-model equipped with five-bladed MT-composite propellers, which had just received a supplemental type certificate (STC) under Air First of Aiken, South Carolina), along with AOPA Pilot technical editor Mike Collins, embarked on an around-the-world journey in the MU-2B-25. The voyage commenced at Aiken Municipal Airport (now Aiken Regional Airport) and visited Nagoya, Japan, on 14 September 2013, the 50th anniversary of the MU-2.

=== Safety concerns ===
In the United States, the MU-2 had a spotty safety record during its early decades, as its high performance coupled with a relatively low purchase price appealed to amateur pilots who did not appreciate how demanding it is to fly compared to slower piston engined aircraft. The MU-2 has performance similar to a small jet, but due to a gross weight less than 12,500 pounds (5,700 kg), U.S. pilot certification rules in force at the time allowed a pilot trained for much slower light twin piston-engined aircraft to fly the MU-2 with only a simple flight instructor endorsement. Inexperience with the MU-2's higher speeds, altitudes, and climb and descent rates resulted in many crashes. In Europe, pilots were required to obtain a specific type rating to fly the MU-2, resulting in roughly half the accident rate of early operations in the U.S.

Some of the aircraft's flight characteristics may be unfamiliar to pilots accustomed to slower light piston twins. Standard engine-out procedures are counterproductive when flying the MU-2; the commonly taught procedure of reducing flap following an engine failure on takeoff leads to a critical reduction in lift in the MU-2 with its unusually large and effective flaps. When pilots were taught to retain takeoff flap and reduce climb rate after an engine failure, MU-2 takeoff accident rates were reduced. Additionally, the MU-2 is sensitive to trim settings, and promptly trimming the aircraft properly in all phases of flight is critical. The absence of adverse yaw eliminates the need to use rudder for coordinated flight, but proper and prompt use of rudder is vital to counter the aircraft's tendency to roll in reaction to engine torque; at low airspeed, the aircraft will rapidly roll and enter an accelerated stall if the pilot applies full power without adequate preparation, and safe recovery from this condition is very difficult at low altitude.

Most crashes early in the type's service life were attributable to pilot error, but in 1981, four uncontrolled descents from altitude prompted the United States National Transportation Safety Board (NTSB) to initiate separate investigations into the cabin pressurization system and autopilot, but the outcome was inconclusive. In 1983, after more crashes, the NTSB convinced the Federal Aviation Administration (FAA) to perform a more comprehensive study of various aircraft systems; the study ultimately did not fault the MU-2's design, but the repeated investigations had damaged the aircraft's reputation by this time. This prompted Mitsubishi, in cooperation with FlightSafety International, to initiate the Pilot's Review of Proficiency (PROP) seminar program to better educate MU-2 pilots about the aircraft's characteristics. The PROP seminars were suspended following the end of MU-2 production in 1986, but were reinstated in 1994 due to continuing accidents.

The aircraft's accident rate caused resale values to fall, and prompted Mitsubishi to campaign the FAA to require an MU-2 type rating. In 2005, the FAA undertook another safety evaluation of the MU-2 and concluded that a properly maintained MU-2 was safe when operated by a well-trained pilot; the study also found that training standards were inconsistent, and sometimes recommended unusual or unauthorized procedures. In 2006, the FAA issued a Special Federal Air Regulation (SFAR) directed at MU-2 operations, with standards exceeding a type rating in some aspects. The training curriculum was standardized and pilots required to receive type-specific initial and recurrent training. A fully functional autopilot became a requirement for single-pilot operations, and FAA-approved checklists and operating manuals must be on board at all times. Unusual for this SFAR, pilot experience in other aircraft types cannot be used to comply with MU-2 operational requirements.

By 2011, the SFAR was credited with lowering MU-2 accident rates below those for similar turboprop aircraft. Additionally, although some owners had worried that the SFAR would depress aircraft prices even further, resale values rebounded as potential owners recognized that the aircraft is very safe with a properly trained pilot. PROP seminars continue to be held biennially, count towards MU-2 training requirements, and have become popular social events for MU-2 operators and even potential buyers, as MU-2 ownership is not required for attendance.

The aircraft had several airworthiness issues early in its service history. Airworthiness directives (ADs) were issued for nose gear cracks and various problems with the TPE331 engine. In April 1993, an emergency AD was issued after four serious accidents, two of them fatal, caused by propeller blade separations in aircraft equipped with similar three- and four-blade Hartzell propellers; the AD required immediate inspections of the propeller assemblies having more than 3,000 flight hours, and also covered various other aircraft types, but focused on the MU-2B-60, since it was the heaviest aircraft using these propellers. Despite these early problems, aviation experts have characterized the MU-2 as being robustly designed and constructed, and relatively few MU-2 crashes have been directly attributed to mechanical or structural failures.

== Variants ==
=== Short fuselage ===
XMU-2
Astazou-powered prototype, 1 built
MU-2A
Prototypes powered by 562 shp (419 kW) Turbomeca Astazou IIK engines, 3 built.
MU-2B
Production variant powered by 605 shp (451 kW) Garrett TPE331-25A engines. 34 built.
MU-2C (MU-2B-10)
Unpressurized variant for the Japan Ground Self-Defense Force, 4 built.
MU-2D (MU-2B-10)
Improved MU-2B, increased gross weight and wet-wings replaced bladder fuel tanks used in earlier versions. 18 built.
MU-2DP (MU-2B-15)
MU-2D with 90-gallon tip tanks and upgraded engines, 3 built.
MU-2E
Unpressurized variant for the Japanese military designated MU-2S
MU-2F (MU-2B-20)
Variant with improved engines and 90-gallon tip tanks as MU-2DP but certified at a higher gross weight and additional fuel tanks, 95 built.
MU-2K (MU-2B-25)
Short fuselage variant of the MU-2J, 83 built.
MU-2M (MU-2B-26)
Revised variant of the MU-2K with increased weight, and increased cabin pressure, 27 built.
MU-2P (MU-2B-26A)
Improved variant with four-bladed propellers and improvements as MU-2N, 31 built.
Solitaire (MU-2B-40)
Variant with improved engines and increased fuel capacity, 57 built between 1979 and 1985.

=== Long fuselage ===
MU-2G (MU-2B-30)
Stretched variant with a 1.91m increase in length, larger cabin and change to landing gear configuration, first flown in January 1969, 46 built.
MU-2J (MU-2B-35)
Variant with improved engines, eleven inch increase in cabin length and increased gross weight, 108 built.
MU-2L (MU-2B-36)
Revised variant of the MU-2L with increased weight, and increased cabin pressure.
MU-2N (MU-2B-36A)
Improved variant with four-bladed propellers and other improvements including an extra cabin window, 36 built.
Marquise (MU-2B-60)
Variant with improved engines ( the -10 Garrett Engines ), improved pressurization system, 139 built.
Cavenaugh Cargoliner
Freighter conversions of long fuselage MU-2 variants by Cavenaugh Aviation Inc. of Conroe, Texas, by addition of a crew door in place of a flight deck window and a large cargo door in the rear port fuselage. Eleven aircraft had been converted by March 1987.

=== Military ===
LR-1
Japanese military designation for MU-2C and MU-2Ks operated by the JGSDF, 20 delivered.
MU-2S
Japanese military designation for a MU-2E search and rescue variant for the air force, 29 delivered.

== Aircraft on display ==
Australia

- An MU-2 is on display at the Australian Aviation Heritage Centre at Darwin International Airport in Darwin, Australia.

Japan

- An MU-2 (registration: JA8628) is on display at the Museum of Aeronautical Sciences in Narita International Airport in Narita, Japan.

Mexico

- An MU-2P (code ETE-1357) is on display at the Museo Militar de Aviacion at the Felipe Ángeles International Airport in Santa Lucia, Mexico.

United States

- An MU-2 is on display at Sparks Aviation at the Tulsa International Airport in Tulsa, Oklahoma, in the United States.

== Incidents and accidents ==
As of April 2025, 172 documented crashes and 400 deaths have involved the MU-2.

- On 19 April 1993, an MU-2B-60 owned by the State of South Dakota, registration number N86SD, sustained extensive damage to the fuselage and left-hand wing and engine mounts after a propeller blade separation during cruise. The pilot was unable to maintain altitude and crashed into a farm silo in low visibility about 8 miles (13 km) south of Dubuque, Iowa. All eight people aboard the aircraft died, including George S. Mickelson, then governor of South Dakota. Later that April, investigators' findings prompted the FAA to order the immediate inspection of Hartzell propellers similar to those on the accident aircraft. The accident was attributed to metal fatigue of the propeller hub caused by improper design and manufacturing.
- On 6 October 2000, an MU-2B-26A, registration number N60BT, crashed in a wooded area short of Runway 24 at Martha's Vineyard Airport in Edgartown, Massachusetts, during a landing approach in low visibility. The crash killed pilot and former New Jersey State Senator Charles B. Yates, his wife, and two of their children. The NTSB attributed the crash to the pilot's failure to follow instrument flight procedures, with the low cloud ceiling being a contributing factor; the report also noted that he had initiated but failed to complete MU-2-specific flight training.
- On 10 November 2013, Perry Inhofe, son of U.S. Senator Jim Inhofe, died when the MU-2 he was flying crashed in Owasso, Oklahoma. Inhofe was the sole occupant of the aircraft.
- On 29 March 2016, an MU-2B-60 operated by Aero Teknic, a Canadian aircraft maintenance company, crashed on approach to Îles-de-la-Madeleine Airport, killing all seven people aboard, including former Canadian politician Jean Lapierre, his family, and the two pilots. An initial survivor died of a heart attack after being pulled from the wreckage. The Transportation Safety Board of Canada investigated the crash and determined that the pilot's decision to continue an unstable approach resulted in loss of control during final approach.

== Specifications (MU-2L) ==
Data from Jane's All The World's Aircraft 1976–77

General characteristics

- Crew: 1 or 2 pilots
- Capacity: 4–12 passengers
- Length: 12.01 m (39 ft 5 in)
- Wingspan: 11.94 m (39 ft 2 in) including tip tanks
- Height: 4.17 m (13 ft 8 in)
- Wing area: 16.55 m^{2} (178.1 sq ft)
- Aspect ratio: 7.71:1
- Airfoil: root: NACA 64A415; tip: NACA 63A212
- Empty weight: 3,433 kg (7,568 lb)
- Max takeoff weight: 5,250 kg (11,574 lb)
- Fuel capacity: 1,388 L (367 US gal; 305 imp gal) maximum usable fuel
- Powerplant: 2 × AiResearch TPE331-6-251M turboprop engines, 579 kW (776 hp) each
- Propellers: 3-bladed Hartzell HC-B3TN-5/T10178HB-11 fully feathering reversible constant-speed propellers, 2.29 m (7 ft 6 in) diameter

Performance

- Cruise speed: 547 km/h (340 mph, 295 kn) at 4,175 kg (9,204 lb) at 4,575 m (15,010 ft) maximum
- Economical cruise speed: 483 km/h (300 mph; 261 kn) at 4,175 kg (9,204 lb) at 7,620 m (25,000 ft)
- Stall speed: 185 km/h (115 mph, 100 kn) flaps down (Calibrated airspeed)
- Range: 2,334 km (1,450 mi, 1,260 nmi) at 7,620 m (25,000 ft) with full wing and tip tanks including 30 minutes reserve
- Service ceiling: 9,020 m (29,590 ft)
- Rate of climb: 12.0 m/s (2,360 ft/min) at sea level
- Take-off run to 15 m (50 ft): 661 m (2,169 ft)
- Landing run from 15 m (50 ft): 573 m (1,880 ft)

== See also ==
Aircraft of comparable role, configuration, and era

- Rockwell Turbo Commander
- Let L-410 Turbolet
