= Renard diamond mine =

Diamond mine in Canada

Renard Mine
- Location within Quebec Location within Canada
- Location: Quebec, Canada; 52°48′49.2″N 72°11′35.3″W
- Products: Diamond
- Opened: 2014

The Renard mine was a diamond mine in Canada which opened in July 2014. The mine is located in Quebec and is projected to produce 1.5–2 million carats per year. In July 2014, SNC-Lavalin was awarded the EPCM contract for mine related construction management. In December 2016 the operator of the mine, Stornoway Diamond, announced it had achieved commercial production at Renard.

In October 2023, the mine "temporarily ceased" activities and filed for creditor protection, as the price of diamonds plummeted, laying off some 85% of its workforce. It was announced in April 2024 that the mine was to be sold to Australian company Winsome Resources and repurposed as a lithium processing plant.

The mine is served by Renard Aerodrome.
