= Îles-de-la-Madeleine Airport =

Airport in the Magdalen Islands, Quebec, Canada

Îles-de-la-Madeleine Airport Aéroport des Îles-de-la-Madeleine
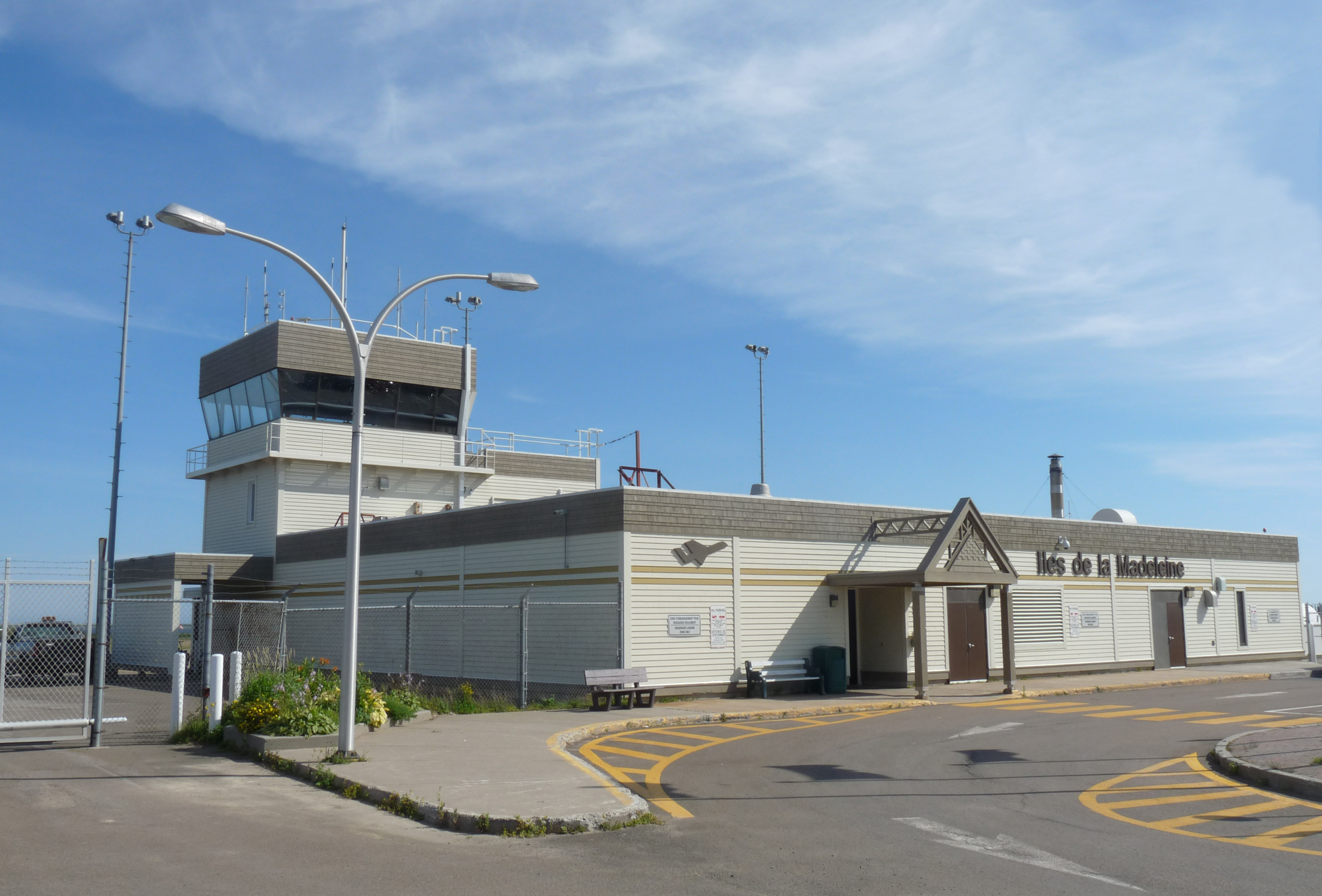
- IATA: YGR; ICAO: CYGR; WMO: 71709

Summary
- Airport type: Public
- Operator: Transport Canada / Aéropro
- Serves: Havre-aux-Maisons
- Location: Magdalen Islands, Quebec
- Time zone: AST (UTC−04:00)
  - Summer (DST): ADT (UTC−03:00)
- Elevation AMSL: 35 ft / 11 m
- Coordinates: 47°25′30″N 061°46′41″W

Map
- Location in Quebec

Runways
Direction	Length		Surface
Direction	ft	m	Surface
07/25	4,493	1,369	Asphalt
16/34	3,608	1,100	Asphalt

Statistics (2010)
- Aircraft movements: 4,448
- Sources: Canada Flight Supplement; Environment Canada; Movements from Statistics Canada

Îles-de-la-Madeleine Airport (IATA: YGR, ICAO: CYGR) (French: Aéroport des Îles-de-la-Madeleine) is located 1.7 nautical miles (3.1 km; 2.0 mi) northeast of the village of Havre-aux-Maisons on Havre-aux-Maisons Island (House Harbour), part of Les Îles-de-la-Madeleine municipality on the Magdalen Islands, Quebec, Canada.

Although it is almost at sea level, nearby land rises significantly to the south, prohibiting circling approaches in that direction. Sea gulls are a frequent concern when landing at Îles-de-la-Madeleine.

The airport is classified as an airport of entry by Nav Canada and is staffed by the Canada Border Services Agency (CBSA). CBSA officers at this airport can handle general aviation aircraft only, with no more than 15 passengers.

== Airlines and destinations ==
Airlines	Destinations
Air Canada Express	Seasonal: Montreal–Trudeau
Air Saint-Pierre	Seasonal: Saint-Pierre
PAL Airlines	Gaspé, Montreal–Trudeau, Québec City
Pascan Aviation	Bonaventure, Gaspé, Montréal–MET, Québec City

The airport was formerly served by Eastern Provincial Airways, Intair and Quebecair when these airlines were in operation.

== Accidents and incidents ==
- On March 29, 2016, a Mitsubishi MU-2 turboprop crashed upon approach to the airport, killing seven people, including former federal Minister of Transport Jean Lapierre, his wife and three of his siblings.
