= Michel-Pouliot Gaspé Airport =

Michel-Pouliot Gaspé Airport Gaspé (Michel-Pouliot) Airport
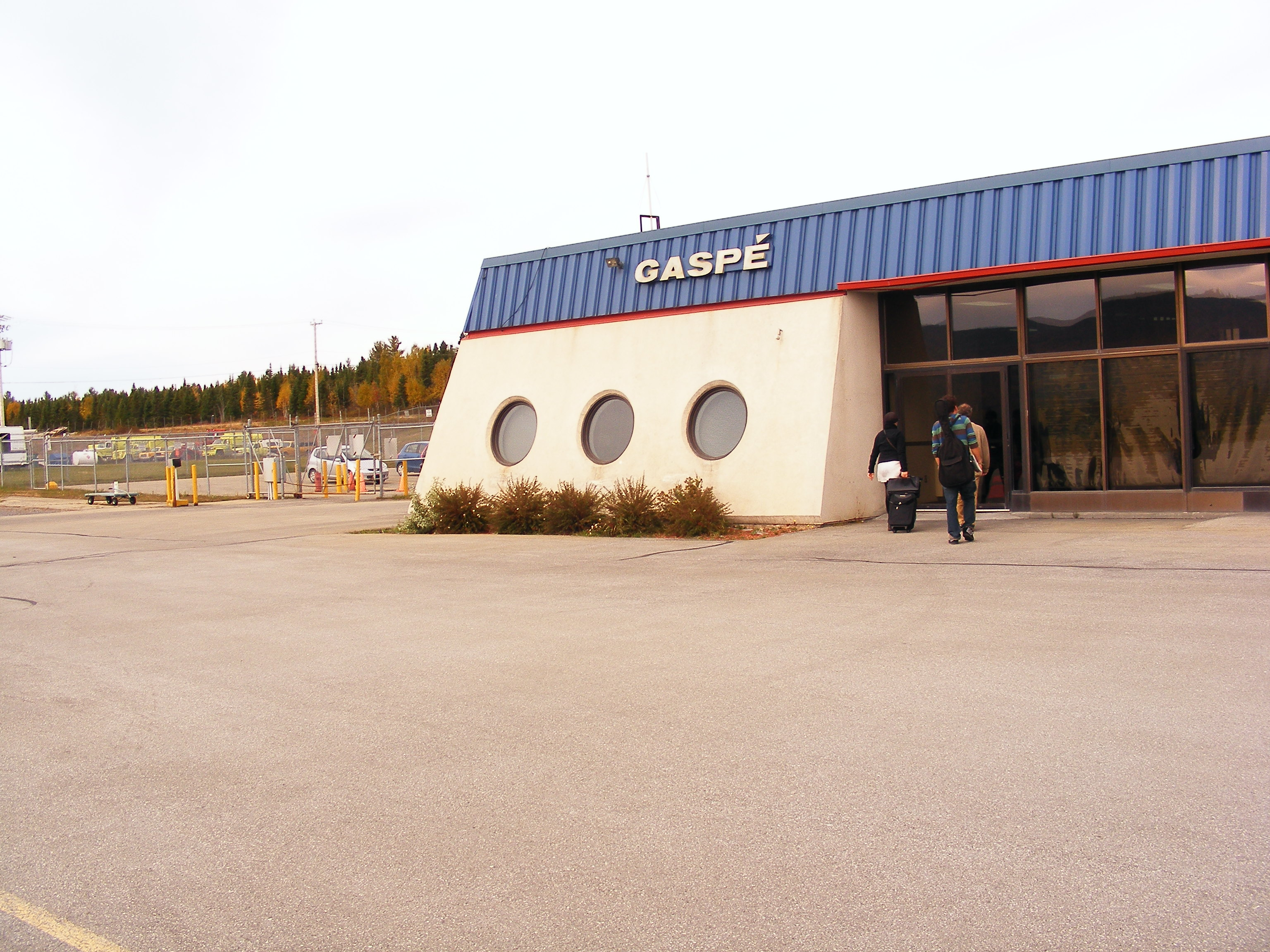
- IATA: YGP; ICAO: CYGP; WMO: 71188

Summary
- Airport type: Public
- Owner/Operator: Municipality of Gaspé
- Serves: Gaspé, Quebec
- Location: Gaspé, Quebec
- Time zone: EST (UTC−05:00)
  - Summer (DST): EDT (UTC−04:00)
- Elevation AMSL: 112 ft / 34 m
- Coordinates: 48°46′30″N 064°28′54″W
- Website: https://ville.gaspe.qc.ca/en/services-municipaux/informations-rapides/aeroport-michel-pouliot-de-gaspe

Map
- Location in Quebec

Runways
Direction	Length		Surface
Direction	ft	m	Surface
10/28	5,488	1,673	Asphalt

Statistics (2010)
- Aircraft movements: 4,506
- Number of passengers: 21,000 (appx.)
- Source: Canada Flight Supplement; Environment Canada; Movements from Statistics Canada; Passengers from Town of Gaspe site

Michel-Pouliot Gaspé Airport or Gaspé (Michel-Pouliot) Airport (IATA: YGP, ICAO: CYGP) is located 3.5 nautical miles (6.5 km; 4.0 mi) west of Gaspé, Quebec, Canada. The airport is non-towered, but has a mandatory frequency linked remotely to the flight service station (FSS) located in Mont-Joli. There are instrument approaches available for poor weather.

Both the city and airport are located in a valley that is oriented in a more or less east–west direction, with the eastern end open to the ocean and the western end terminating in the highlands. For this reason, most small (i.e. unpressurized) aircraft prefer to approach from the east, thereby avoiding the steep descent over the high hills to the west.

== History ==
Transport Canada began construction of the airport in 1965, and handed control to the municipality in 1967 (while continuing to subsidize the airport). The airport added a terminal building in 1972, and a hangar and flight service station in 1974. The hangar was destroyed by a fire in 1978 and rebuilt in 1979; the flight service station has subsequently been closed. In 1983, Transport Canada installed navigation aids (the airport has both a VOR and a LOC), and formally handed full control of the airport over to the municipality in 1998 as a result of the National Airports Policy.

Air Canada, the only airline that was operating scheduled passenger flights from the airport, indefinitely suspended its routes to Gaspé Airport in June 2020 due to the financial impact of the COVID-19 pandemic in Canada. Pascan Aviation and PAL Airlines started operation in mid 2021.

== Airlines and destinations ==
Airlines	Destinations
PAL Airlines	Îles-de-la-Madeleine, Montreal–Trudeau, Québec City
Pascan Aviation	Bonaventure, Îles-de-la-Madeleine, Montréal–MET, Québec City
