= Québec City Jean Lesage International Airport =

International airport in Sainte-Foy, Quebec, Canada

Québec City Jean Lesage International Airport Aéroport international Jean-Lesage de Québec

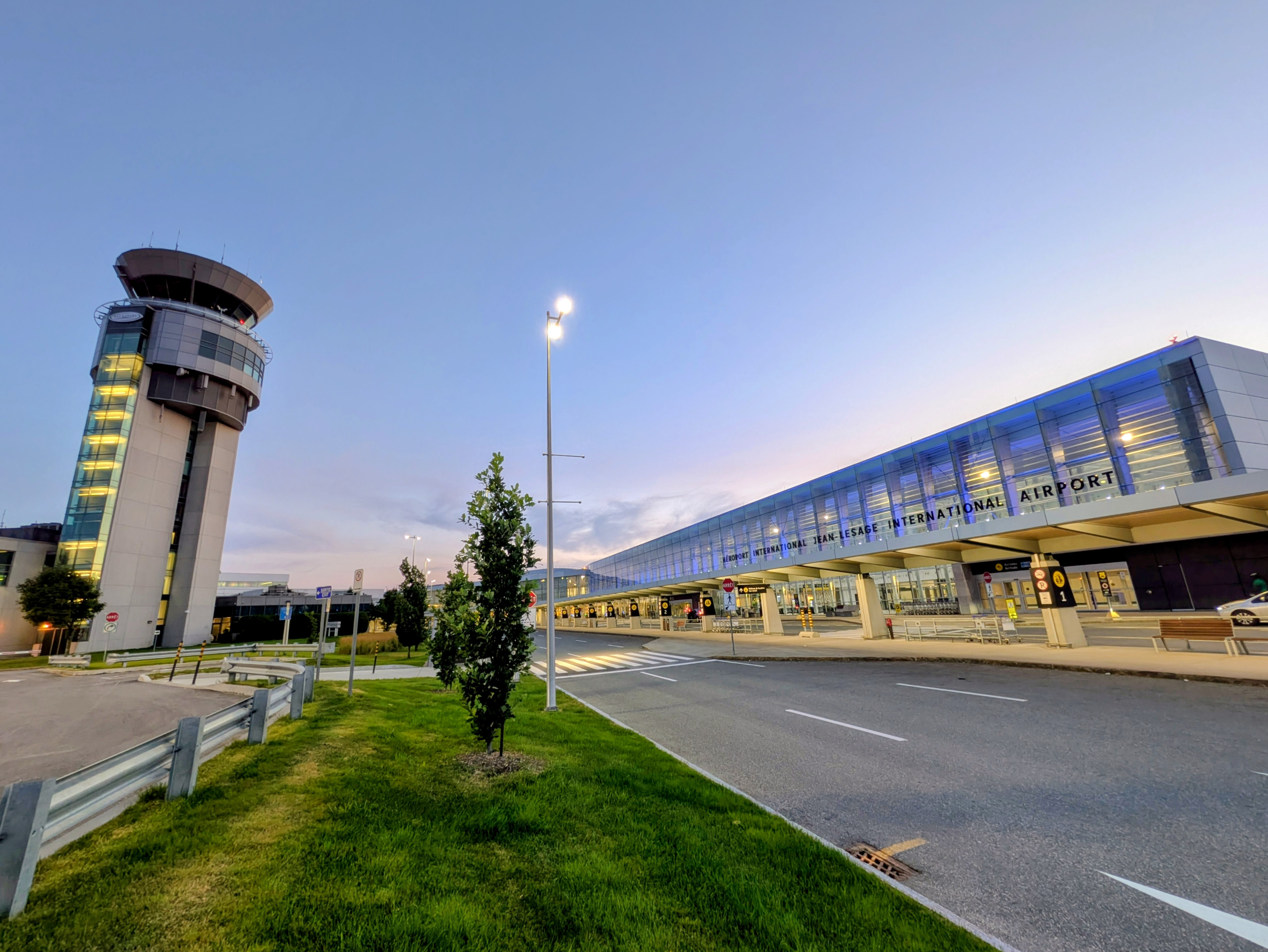
- IATA: YQB; ICAO: CYQB; WMO: 71708

Summary
- Airport type: Public / Military
- Owner: Transport Canada
- Operator: Aéroport de Québec Inc.
- Serves: Québec City metropolitan area
- Location: Quebec City, Quebec, Canada
- Focus city for: Air Transat
- Operating base for: Chrono Aviation
- Time zone: EST (UTC−05:00)
  - Summer (DST): EDT (UTC−04:00)
- Elevation AMSL: 243 ft (74 m)
- Coordinates: 46°47′28″N 071°23′36″W
- Public transit access: RTC 76 80
- Website: www.aeroportdequebec.com

Map
- Location within Quebec

Runways
| Direction | Length | | Surface |
| Direction | ft | m | Surface |
|---|---|---|---|
| 06/24 | 9,000 | 2,743 | Asphalt |
| 11/29 | 5,700 | 1,737 | Asphalt |

Statistics (2025)
- Passengers: 1,819,553
- Aircraft movements: 142,460
- Sources: Canada Flight Supplement; Environment Canada; Movements from Statistics Canada; Passenger statistics from Aéroport de Québec

Québec City Jean Lesage International Airport, also known as Jean Lesage International Airport (French: Aéroport international Jean-Lesage de Québec, or Aéroport de Québec) (IATA: YQB, ICAO: CYQB), is the primary airport serving Quebec City, Canada. Designated as an international airport by Transport Canada, it is located in the western part of the city, in the Sainte-Foy–Sillery–Cap-Rouge borough. In 2025, it was the 11th-busiest airport in Canada by number of passengers with 1,819,553 passengers. More than ten airlines offer hundreds of weekly flights to destinations across Canada, the United States, Central America, Mexico, the Caribbean and Europe.

== History ==
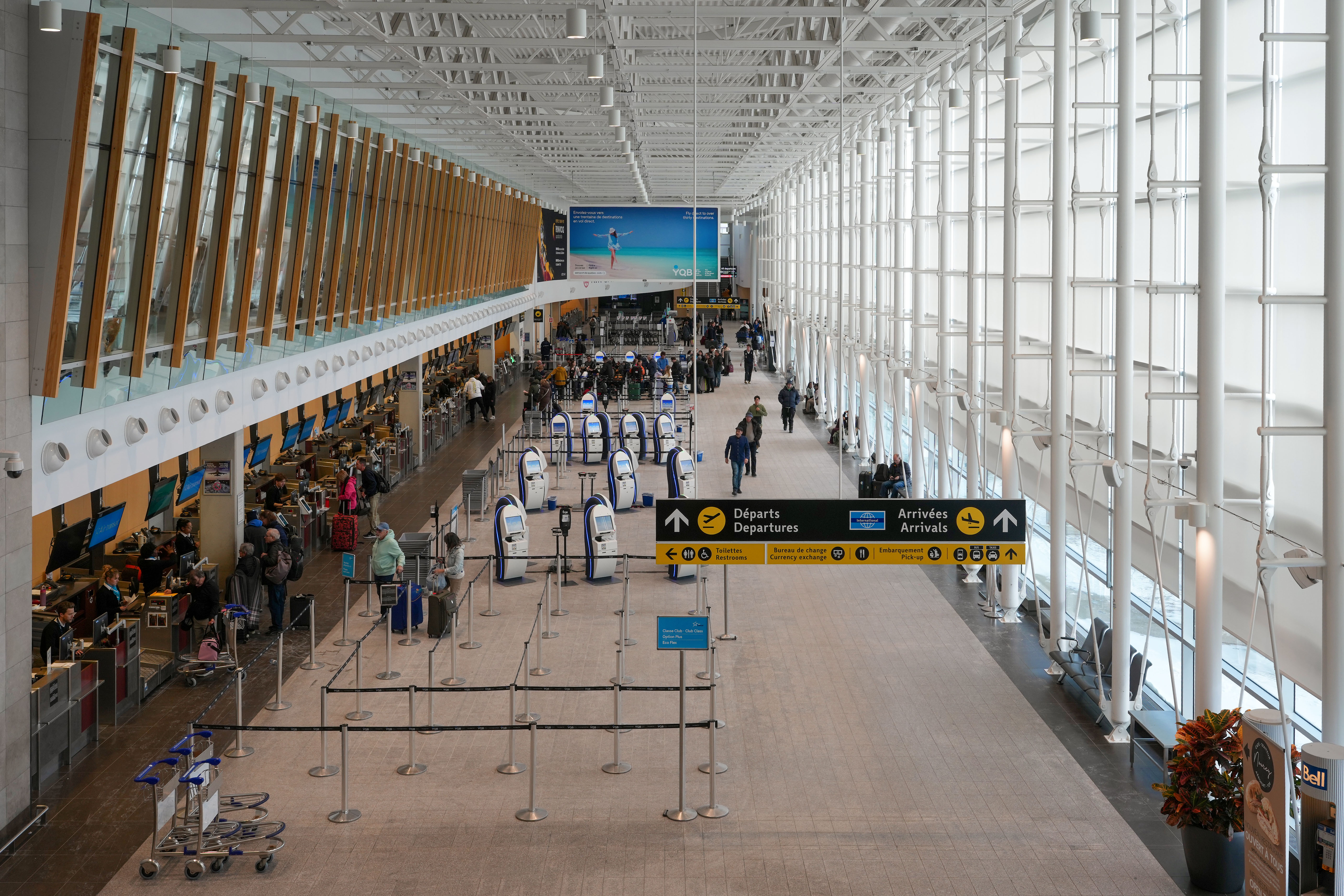
Interior of the Québec City Jean Lesage International Airport

The airport was established in 1939, a year after the closure of the Aérodrome Saint-Louis. Established as a training facility for air observers, the first flight occurred on September 11, 1941. First known as the Aéroport de l'Ancienne Lorette, then the Aéroport de Sainte-Foy, and later the Aéroport de Québec, it was renamed to Aéroport international Jean-Lesage in 1993, in honour of Jean Lesage, the former Premier of Quebec. The airport is managed and operated by Aéroport de Québec inc., a non-profit and non-share corporation.

Beginning in 2006, with a budget of $65.8 million, Québec/Jean Lesage International Airport underwent a modernization designed to increase the terminal's capacity and substantially enhance the level of passenger service. The modernization included reconfiguring the terminal on two levels, restructuring the baggage handling area and arrivals area, and reconfiguring and enlargement of the waiting rooms. Fifty-four percent of the financing was provided directly by Aéroport de Québec inc. Completed in June 2008, the new configuration of the airport enabled it to handle 1.4 million passengers a year.

Based on the passenger figures for 2009 and 2010, it became clear that the terminal building would reach its design capacity by 2012. Aéroport de Québec inc. therefore began planning further investments of nearly $300 million to expand the terminal building again. On July 4, 2011, work began on the second phase of the airport expansion, which lasted until 2017. Partially funded through an Airport Improvement Fee, the terminal building was doubled in size, at a cost of $224.8 million. The work included expanding the international facilities, redoing runways, changing and upgrading the layout of the taxiways, and enhancing customer service facilities.

On September 19, 2013, because of earth magnetic north pole drift, runway 12/30 was renamed to runway 11/29.

On 10 March 2016, Prime Minister Justin Trudeau and President Barack Obama announced the addition of the airport to the list of Canadian airports containing U.S. border preclearance facilities. In 2019, Trudeau and President Donald Trump also announced that the airport would obtain border preclearance. However, as of March 2024, preclearance is not yet available.

On December 11, 2017, the first phase of YQB2018, the expansion project, was completed with the opening of the new international terminal. Features included more dedicated baggage carousels serving international flights, a new customs area, an expanded food court and restaurant area, four new gates (34 to 37), an improved and larger loading area for cars and buses, and a larger capacity baggage area.

The last expansion phase, which involved linking the domestic and international terminals, was completed in the summer of 2019.

== Facilities ==
Quebec Jean-Lesage International Airport has two runways, 06/24 and 11/29, served by seven taxiways. Runway 06/24 is the main and longest runway measuring 9000' by 150'. The secondary runway 11/29 is 5700' by 150'. The airport has three aprons; Apron 1 and Apron 2 serve the main terminal and Apron 3 caters to general aviation with its varied FBOs, charter companies, flight schools and maintenance facilities.

The main terminal has 17 gates numbered 20 to 37, 12 of which have a jet-bridge. CYQB is designated as an Airport of Entry by the Canadian Border Services Agency and has full customs services for international travellers.

Two governmental entities are also based on the field, the Canadian Coast Guard has a helicopter base and Quebec's Service Aerien Gouvernemental which, in addition to specialized medevac aircraft, operates one of the largest Canadair water bomber fleet worldwide.

Premier Aviation operates a 60,000 square-foot heavy maintenance facility on the northeast side of the airport servicing the ATRs, Embraer ERJ family and de Havilland Canada Dash 8 aircraft types from national and international customers such as Calm Air and United Express.

Quebec Jean-Lesage International Airport also features 10 special holes in the security fence placed at positions strategically and jointly determined by the airport authority and a local plane spotting group that allow photographers and spotters to insert telephoto lenses and photograph airport activities. These holes are specifically reserved for this use and are situated all around the perimeter of the airport. In 2019, the American website Digital Photography Review called the airport "the number one spot for aviation photographers".

== Operations ==
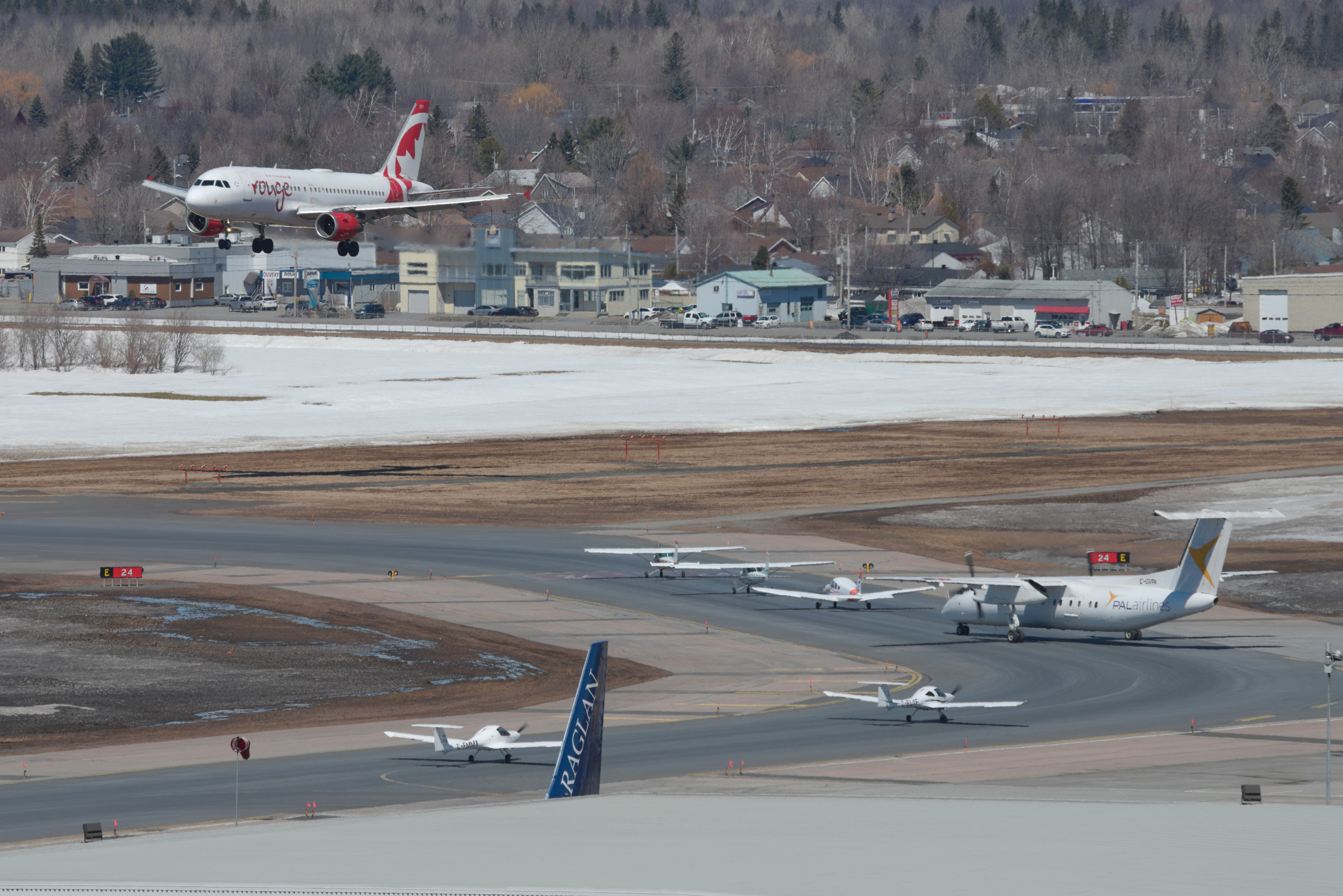
Multiple types of light aircraft and a Dash 8 holding short of runway 24 while an A319 lands

Québec City Jean Lesage International Airport is open and active 24/7 with no curfew times. Nav Canada operates a control tower on site and a Terminal Control Unit based in the Montreal ACC, both operating as Class C airspace as defined by CARs. ATC operations can be conducted in both French and English at the discretion of the pilot. Air Traffic Controllers in CYQB are often working in both languages at the same time.

All runways are served by RNAV approaches with LPV minimums and RNP approaches. In addition, runway 06 has an Instrument landing system approach.

A very diverse mix of traffic operates daily and concurrently at CYQB. Aircraft ranging from light training aircraft such as the Cessna 152 and Diamond DV-20 used by the flight schools, helicopters such as the Bell 429 used by the Canadian Coast Guard or Bell 412 of the Royal Canadian Air Force based in CFB Valcartier, small turboprops such as the Pilatus PC-12 or Beechcraft 1900D flown by Chrono Aviation and Air Liaison, float planes operating from the nearby Lac Saint-Augustin Water Airport and medium to heavy commercial aircraft such as the Q400, CRJs, A321, 737, A330 and 777 among others, make up the around 142 000 yearly aircraft movements at the airport.

Due to Quebec City being one of the snowiest cities on earth, with an average of 315 to 400 cm (124 to 157 in) of snow accumulation every year intense winter conditions and snow removal operations occur regularly between November and April. CYQB has a Reduced Visibility Operations program permitting operations down to half-mile visibility on runway 24 and 1200' (350 m) runway visual range on runway 06.

Jean-Lesage airport also sees heavy use of land and hold short operations (LAHSO) operations when runways 24 and 29 are active. The stopping distances for those runways with LAHSO are respectively 5400' and 3800'. In easterly winds, runway 11 is very rarely used, runway 06 is preferred even with crosswinds of up to 25 knots.

== Airlines and destinations ==
=== Passenger ===
| Airlines | Destinations |
|---|---|
| Air Canada | Fort-de-France, Montréal–Trudeau, Toronto–Pearson; Seasonal: Cancún, Fort Lauderdale, Orlando, Pointe-à-Pitre (begins December 17, 2026), Punta Cana, Vancouver |
| Air Canada Express | Montréal–Trudeau, Ottawa, Toronto–Pearson |
| Air Canada Rouge | Montréal–Trudeau, Toronto–Pearson |
| Air France | Seasonal: Paris–Charles de Gaulle |
| Air Inuit | Montréal–Trudeau, Kuujjuaq, Schefferville, Sept-Îles |
| Air Transat | Cancún, Fort-de-France, Paris–Charles de Gaulle, Puerto Plata, Punta Cana; Seasonal: Barcelona (begins June 14, 2027), Fort Lauderdale, Lyon (begins June 8, 2027), Marseille, Montréal–Trudeau, Nantes, Pointe-à-Pitre, Puerto Vallarta, Río Hato (begins December 20, 2026), Samaná, San José (CR) (begins December 15, 2026), Tulum |
| American Eagle | Seasonal: Charlotte, Chicago–O'Hare, Dallas/Fort Worth, New York–JFK, Philadelphia |
| PAL Airlines | Gaspé, Îles-de-la-Madeleine, Montréal–Trudeau, Sept-Îles, Wabush |
| Pascan Aviation | Gaspé, Îles-de-la-Madeleine, Montréal–MET |
| Porter Airlines | Toronto–Billy Bishop, Toronto–Pearson |
| United Airlines | Seasonal: Denver (begins May 29, 2027) |
| United Express | Newark; Seasonal: Chicago–O'Hare, Washington–Dulles |
| WestJet | Cancún, Punta Cana; Seasonal: Calgary, Montego Bay, Puerto Plata, Puerto Vallarta, Río Hato |

=== Cargo ===
| Airlines | Destinations |
|---|---|
| UPS Airlines operated by Pascan Aviation | Montréal–Mirabel |

== Statistics ==
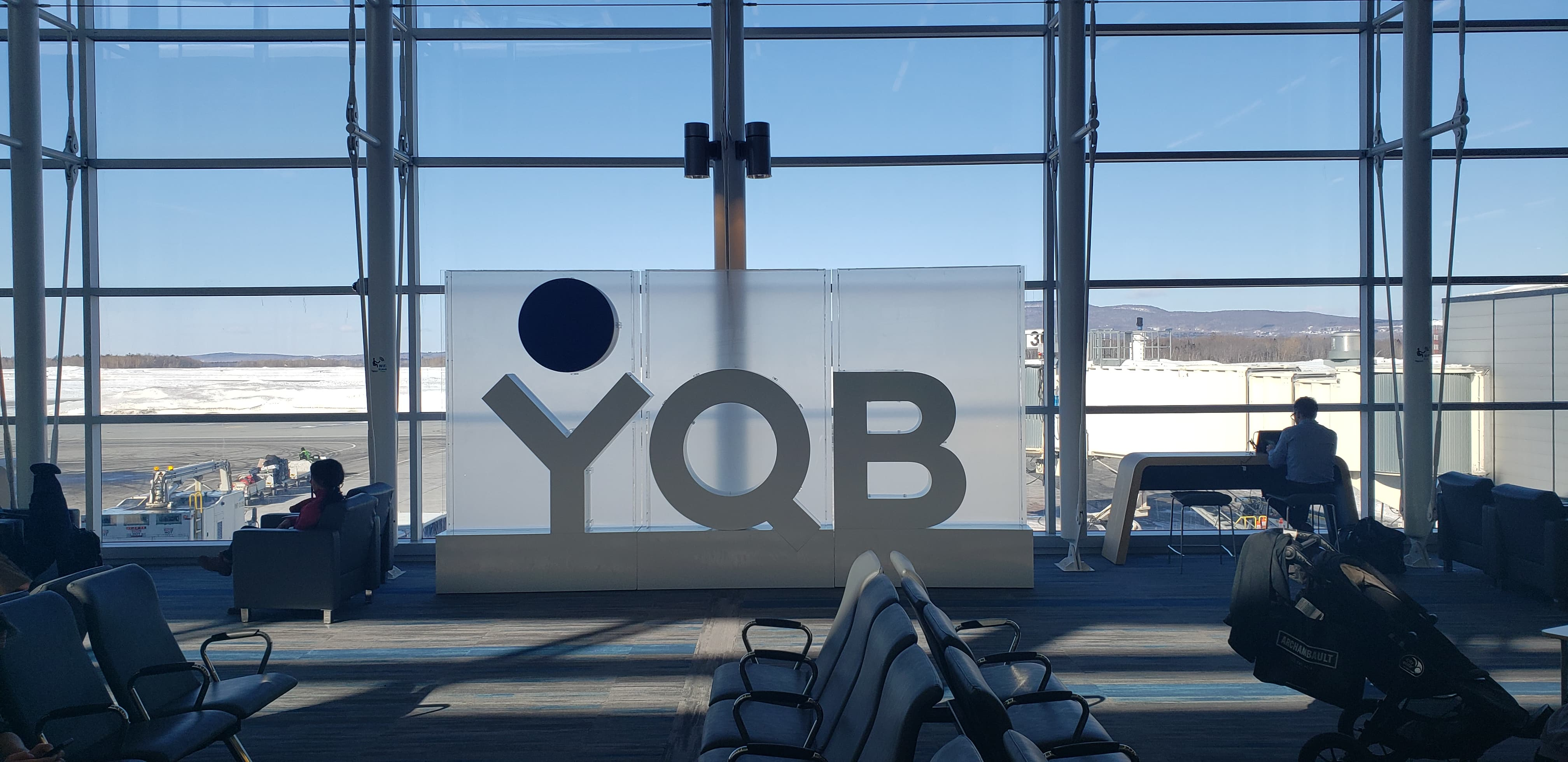
Terminal interior

Passenger statistics and aircraft movements for Jean Lesage International Airport
| Year | Total passengers^{A} | Aircraft movements |
|---|---|---|
| 2000 | 672,829 | 142,612 |
| 2001 | 642,767 | 151,650 |
| 2002 | 610,568 | 135,646 |
| 2003 | 628,545 | 116,523 |
| 2004 | 715,106 | 109,180 |
| 2005 | 793,735 | 101,367 |
| 2006 | 802,263 | 109,031 |
| 2007 | 899,612 | 119,441 |
| 2008 | 1,022,862 | 125,512 |
| 2009 | 1,035,026 | 128,890 |
| 2010 | 1,190,088 | 126,856 |
| 2011 | 1,313,432 | 128,748 |
| 2012 | 1,342,840 | 133,675 |
| 2013 | 1,475,717 | 118,265 |
| 2014 | 1,574,699 | 112,468 |
| 2015 | 1,584,713 | 110,345 |
| 2016 | 1,615,750 | 116,190 |
| 2017 | 1,670,880 | 121,680 |
| 2018 | 1,774,871 | 137,228 |
| 2019 | 1,789,005 | 144,963 |
| 2020 | 535,111 | 117,390 |
| 2021 | 353,203 | 129,649 |
| 2022 | 1,174,321 | 134,400 |
| 2023 | 1,688,736 | 117,680 |
| 2024 | 1,737,803 | 128,526 |
| 2025 | 1,819,553 | 142,460 |

- ^AStatistics prior to 2009 are from Transport Canada. From 2009 on, statistics are from Aéroport de Québec (ADQ). Transport Canada's statistics are consistently higher than those of ADQ.

=== Top domestic destinations ===
Busiest domestic flights out of YQB by frequency
| Rank | Destinations (operated by) | Carriers |
|---|---|---|
| 1 | Montreal | Air Canada, Air Transat, Air Inuit, PAL Airlines |
| 2 | Toronto | Air Canada, WestJet |
| 3 | Saint-Hubert | Pascan Aviation |
| 4 | Sept-Iles | Air Canada, Air Inuit, Pascan Aviation |
| 5 | Gaspé | Pascan Aviation, PAL Airlines |

=== Top United States destinations ===
Busiest transborder flights out of YQB by frequency
| Rank | Destinations (operated by) | Carriers |
|---|---|---|
| 1 | Newark | United Airlines |
| 2 | Chicago | American Airlines, United Airlines |
| 3 | Philadelphia | American Airlines |
| 4 | Fort Lauderdale | Air Transat, Air Canada |
| 5 | Orlando | Air Transat |

=== Top international destinations ===
Busiest international flights out of YQB by frequency
| Rank | Destinations (operated by) | Carriers |
|---|---|---|
| 1 | Punta Cana | Air Canada, Air Transat, Sunwing Airlines |
| 2 | Cancún | Air Canada, Air Transat, Sunwing Airlines |
| 3 | Varadero | Air Transat, Sunwing Airlines |
| 4 | Santa Clara | Air Canada, Air Transat, Sunwing Airlines |
| 5 | Paris | Air Transat, Air France |

== Access ==
Public transportation to the airport is provided by Réseau de transport de la Capitale route 76 to Via Rail's Sainte-Foy station and route 80 to downtown.

== Accidents and incidents ==
- On 9 September 1949, Canadian Pacific Air Lines Flight 108 on a flight from Montreal to Baie-Comeau with a stopover in Quebec City crash-landed east of Quebec City when a bomb exploded on board shortly after departing from Quebec City Jean Lesage Airport (then known as L'Ancienne-Lorette Airport), killing all 19 passengers and four crew. The incident and trial that followed would be known as the Albert Guay Affair.
- On 29 March 1979, Quebecair Flight 255, a Fairchild F-27, crashed after take-off, killing 17 and injuring seven.
- On 23 June 2010, a Beechcraft A100 King Air of Aeropro (registration C-FGIN) crashed north of the airport just after taking off from runway 30 (now runway 29), killing all seven people on board.
- On 12 October 2017, a drone collided with a passenger plane for the first time in North America. The drone struck the turboprop passenger plane operated by Skyjet Aviation while it was on approach. The drone was operating above the 90 m (300 ft) flight height restriction and within the 5 km (3.1 mi) exclusion zone around airports, violating drone operating regulations.
- On 1 August 2023, a Cessna 152 (C-FNBP) operated by Orizon Aviation Québec Inc. crashed in an almost-vertical, nose-down attitude onto a grassy area near Runway 24 at Québec/Jean Lesage International Airport following a bounced landing and unsuccessful go-around during a student pilot’s first solo flight, resulting in serious injuries.

== See also ==
Comparable Canadian airports:

- Halifax Stanfield International Airport
- Saskatoon John G. Diefenbaker International Airport
- Winnipeg James Armstrong Richardson International Airport
