= Bonaventure Airport =

Airport in Bonaventure, Quebec, Canada

- IATA: YVB; ICAO: CYVB

Summary
- Airport type: Public
- Operator: Airport Administration; Transports Québec
- Location: Bonaventure, Quebec
- Time zone: EST (UTC−05:00)
  - Summer (DST): EDT (UTC−04:00)
- Elevation AMSL: 123 ft / 37 m
- Coordinates: 48°04′16″N 065°27′37″W

Map
- Location in Quebec

Runways
Direction	Length		Surface
Direction	ft	m	Surface
13/31	5,985	1,824	Asphalt
- Source: Canada Flight Supplement

Bonaventure Airport (IATA: YVB, ICAO: CYVB) is located 1.6 nautical miles (3.0 km; 1.8 mi) northeast of Bonaventure, Quebec, Canada.

== Airlines and destinations ==
Airlines	Destinations
Pascan Aviation	Îles-de-la-Madeleine, Montréal–MET, Quebec City
