= Montreal Metropolitan Airport =

Airport in the Saint-Hubert borough of Longueuil, Quebec, Canada

MET – Montreal Metropolitan Airport MET – Aéroport métropolitain de Montréal

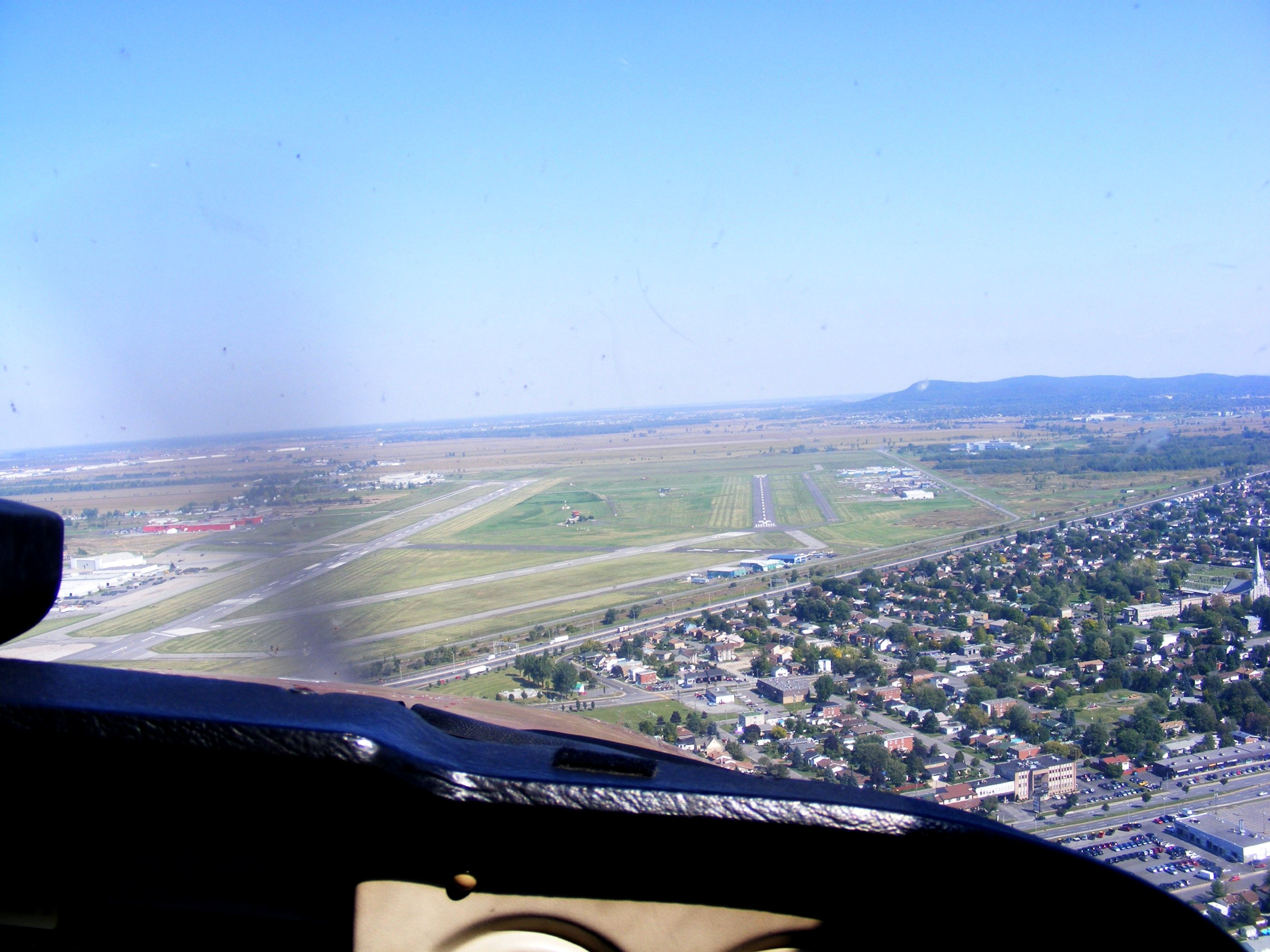
- IATA: YHU; ICAO: CYHU; WMO: 71371

Summary
- Airport type: Public
- Operator: DASH-L (Développement Aéroport Saint-Hubert de Longueuil)
- Serves: Montreal
- Location: Longueuil, Quebec, Canada
- Hub for: Pascan Aviation
- Operating base for: Chrono Aviation
- Built: 1927; 99 years ago
- Time zone: EST (UTC−05:00)
  - Summer (DST): EDT (UTC−04:00)
- Elevation AMSL: 90 ft (27 m)
- Coordinates: 45°31′05″N 073°25′01″W
- Website: www.metmtl.com

Map
- Location within Quebec Location within Canada

Runways
| Direction | Length | | Surface |
| Direction | ft | m | Surface |
|---|---|---|---|
| 06L/24R | 7,801 | 2,378 | Asphalt |
| 06R/24L | 3,922 | 1,195 | Asphalt |
| 10/28 | 2,420 | 738 | Asphalt |

Statistics (2023)
- Aircraft movements: 116,721
- Sources: Canada Flight Supplement; Environment and Climate Change Canada; Movements from Statistics Canada

MET – Montreal Metropolitan Airport (IATA: YHU, ICAO: CYHU) (French: MET – Aéroport métropolitain de Montréal), formerly known as Montréal Saint-Hubert - Longueuil Airport (Aéroport Montréal Saint-Hubert - Longueuil) or Montréal/Saint-Hubert Airport, and still commonly referred to as St-Hubert Airport, is located in the Saint-Hubert borough of Longueuil, Quebec. The airport is located 16 km (9.9 mi) east of Downtown Montreal and 3 nautical miles (5.6 km; 3.5 mi) east of downtown Longueuil.

It is one of two airports with scheduled airlines located in the Montreal area, alongside the primary Montréal–Trudeau International Airport. As of 2023, it is ranked as Canada's 12th busiest airport by aircraft movements.

The airport primarily served destinations within Quebec until June 2026 when a new commercial passenger terminal was opened. Porter Airlines serves destinations across Canada from the new terminal, which has a capacity of nearly 4 million passengers per year.

The airport is classified as an airport of entry by Nav Canada and is staffed by the Canada Border Services Agency (CBSA) on a call-out basis from Montréal–Mirabel International Airport. CBSA officers at this airport can handle general aviation aircraft only, with no more than 15 passengers.

== History ==
Canada became involved in the Imperial Airship Scheme during the 1926 Imperial Conference, when prime minister William Lyon Mackenzie King pledged Canada's assistance to Great Britain. Money was set aside for the construction of an airship base, airport and mooring mast in eastern Canada.

British experts came over in May 1927 to choose a site, and visited a number of locations in Ontario, Quebec and Atlantic Canada. They settled on a piece of land on the south shore of Montreal, at Saint-Hubert, and officially announced the decision in August 1927. Work on the airfield began almost immediately and Saint-Hubert’s first airmail delivery took place in November 1927.

Also during the summer of 1927, the British Air Ministry decided to send the R100 to Canada. On August 1, 1930, the R100 airship arrived after what was possibly the first non-stop passenger-carrying powered transatlantic flight across the North Atlantic to land in Canada.

In the late 1930s, the airport was used by Canadian Associated Aircraft to build the Handley Page Hampden.

Canada’s first air traffic control tower opened at the Saint-Hubert Airport on April 13, 1939. It was Montreal's first and only airport until the opening of Dorval Airport (now Montréal–Trudeau International Airport) in 1941.

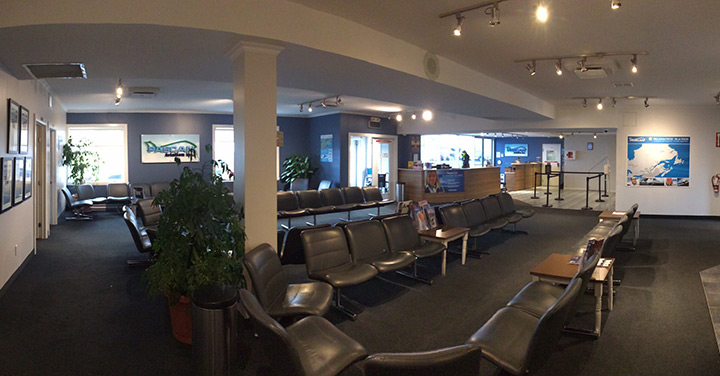
Pascan Aviation's fixed-base operator lounge in the airport

The airport was divided into two sides, a military side along with the Pratt & Whitney Canada facility (facing runway 06L/24R) and a civilian side (facing runway 06R/24L). Today the military base, the former RCAF Station St Hubert, has ceased operations, but the Canadian Armed Forces still use the base as a garrison comprising the tactical helicopter unit, 438 Squadron, 34 Service Battalion and 34 Canadian Brigade Group Headquarters. The ex-Pratt & Whitney hangar is owned and operated since 2012 as the largest fixed-base operator on the airport by an AvJet branded dealer: CYHU H-18 Services Inc. Their hangar is the newest addition to the fixed-base operator network: HUB FBO.

Following the new National Airports Policy announced by Transport Canada in 1994, ownership of the airport was transferred to a private corporation, Développement de l'aéroport Saint-Hubert de Longueuil (DASH-L), on September 1, 2004.

The body of Quebec minister of labour and deputy premier, Pierre Laporte, was found at the airport during the 1970 October Crisis.

=== Recent upgrades and expansion ===
In 2018, the runway was upgraded to accommodate larger aircraft and attract low-cost carriers.

On February 27, 2023, it was announced that Porter Airlines would develop a new passenger terminal at the airport to be completed in late 2025 and provide domestic flights throughout Canada.

In 2024, it was announced that Saint-Hubert Airport would be rebranded as Montreal Metropolitan Airport (Aéroport métropolitain de Montréal) with the abbreviation "MET".

In March 2026, the airport's new passenger terminal was unveiled, with an opening date set for June 15, 2026, and with Porter Airlines as the launch carrier. By offering only domestic flights, this avoids the requirements for customs, immigration, and international processing. Passengers can arrive as late as 30 minutes before their flight, making convenience and time savings a differentiator compared to Montreal Dorval.

The airport terminal is connected to the Montreal Metro by a bus service operated by the Réseau de transport de Longueuil to the Longueuil–Université-de-Sherbrooke station.

On June 15, 2026, Porter Airlines commenced flights from MET to 11 Canadian destinations, including Vancouver, Calgary, Edmonton and Toronto.

== Airlines and destinations ==
| Airlines | Destinations |
|---|---|
| Pascan Aviation | Saint John (NB) |
| Porter Airlines | Calgary, Edmonton, Halifax, Hamilton (ON), London (ON) (begins April 12, 2027), Toronto–Billy Bishop, Toronto–Pearson, Vancouver; Seasonal: Charlottetown, Moncton, St. John's (NL), Winnipeg |

Air Liaison operates from the airport, but boards its passengers from a fixed-based operator (FBO) terminal.

== Accidents and incidents ==
- On March 17, 2017, about 13:00 EDT (17:00 UTC), a midair collision occurred on the southeastern side of the airport, over the city of Saint-Bruno-de-Montarville. The two planes collided at an approximate altitude of 1,100 ft (340 m) over the Promenades Saint-Bruno, both aircraft being Cessna 152 owned by Cargair flight training school. One plane crashed on the rooftop of the shopping mall, injuring the pilot. The other crashed in the parking lot, killing the pilot.

== See also ==
- List of airports in the Montreal area
- CFB Montreal

== Bibliography ==
- Jesse, William. "Breaking New Ground: The Canadian Government's First Civil Aerodrome". Air Enthusiast, No. 55, Autumn 1994, pp. 14–15. ISSN 0143-5450
