= List of airlines of Quebec =

This is a list of airlines of Quebec which have an air operator's certificate issued by Transport Canada, the country's civil aviation authority. These are airlines that are based in Quebec.

== Current airlines ==
| Airline | Image | IATA | ICAO | Callsign | Hub airport(s) or headquarters | Notes |
|---|---|---|---|---|---|---|
| Air Canada | | AC | ACA | AIR CANADA | Montréal–Trudeau, Toronto Pearson, Calgary, Vancouver(Edmonton international airport/Edmonton)) | Flag carrier of Canada. Largest in Canada. |
| Air Canada Rouge | | RV | ROU | ROUGE | Montréal–Trudeau, Toronto Pearson, Calgary, Vancouver | Regional |
| Air Creebec | | YN | CRQ | CREE | Val-d'Or | Regional, charters |
| Air Inuit | | 3H | AIE | INUIT | Montréal–Trudeau | Scheduled passenger service, charters, combi, cargo, helicopter |
| Air Montmagny | | | | | Montmagny | Charters, sky diving |
| Air Saguenay | | | | | Chutes-des-Passes, Lac Sébastien | Regional, charters, floatplanes |
| Air Transat | | TS | TSC | AIR TRANSAT | Montréal–Trudeau | Scheduled passenger service, charter airline. Owned by Transat A.T. |
| Canadian Helicopters | | | CDN | CANADIAN | Les Cèdres, Quebec | Charters, flight training, aerial firefighting. Along with Kelowna Flightcraft Air Charter, Atlantis Systems International and Canadian Base Operators operates Allied Wings. |
| Chrono Aviation | | | NDL; MBK | NEEDLE; MATBLACK | Québec City Jean Lesage, Montréal/Saint-Hubert | Charter airline |
| Exact Air | | | | | Baie-Comeau | Scheduled, charter passenger and cargo services, as well as supplying aviation fuel, ground services and aircraft maintenance and repair |
| Jazz Aviation | | QK | JZA | JAZZ | Calgary, Halifax; Montréal–Trudeau, Toronto Pearson, Vancouver | Scheduled passenger service as Air Canada Express. |
| Nolinor Aviation | | | NRL | NOLINOR | Montréal–Mirabel | Charter airline |
| Pascan Aviation | | | PSC | PASCAN | Montréal/Saint-Hubert | Regional airline, charters |
| Propair | | | PRO | PROPAIR | Rouyn-Noranda | Charter airline, MEDIVAC (air ambulance) |
| Skyservice Business Aviation | | | | | Montréal–Trudeau, Toronto Pearson | Charters, MEDIVAC (air ambulance). Example colours only; aircraft now registered to Albatros Aircraft Corporation. |
| Starlink Aviation | | Q4 | TLK | STARLINK | Montréal–Trudeau | Example colours only; aircraft no longer registered in Canada |
| Sunwing Airlines | | WG | SWG | SUNWING | Montréal–Trudeau, Toronto Pearson | Scheduled passenger service, charter airline |
| Visionair Quebec | | | | Visionair | Québec City Jean Lesage | flight training |

== Defunct airlines ==
| Airline | Image | IATA | ICAO | Callsign | Hub airport(s) or headquarters | Notes |
|---|---|---|---|---|---|---|
| Aeropro | | | APO | AEROPRO | Québec City Jean Lesage | 1998 - 2010 |
| Air Alliance | | 3J | AAQ | LIAISON | Québec City Jean Lesage | 1988 - 1999, to Air Nova |
| Air Charter Systems | | | | | Montréal–Mirabel | 1986 – 1988, reincarnated in 1997 as International Cargo Charter and operating until 2003 |
| Air Canada Tango | | AC | ACA | | Montréal–Trudeau | 2001 - 2004, name retained as a type of fare on its regular Air Canada services |
| Air Club International | | | | | Montréal–Mirabel | 1993 - 1998, charter airline with flights to Europe |
| Air Fecteau | | | | | Senneterre (defunct) | 1936-1967, sold to Quebecair |
| Air Gaspé | | | | | Sept-Îles | 1951 - 1986, became a subsidiary of Quebecair in 1973 |
| Air Satellite | | 6O | ASJ | SATELLITE | Baie-Comeau | 1968 - 2008, to Exact Air |
| Air Schefferville | | | | | Schefferville | |
| Airtransit | | | | | Victoria STOLport, Ottawa/Rockcliffe | 1973 - 1975, a wholly owned subsidiary of Air Canada |
| Canadian Colonial Airways | | | | | Montreal | 1929 - 1942, reformed as Colonial Airlines |
| Colonial Airlines | | | | | Montreal | 1942 - 1956, formed from Canadian Colonial Airways sold to Eastern Air Lines |
| Fecteau Transport Aerien | | | | | Senneterre (defunct) | 1936 - 1973, renamed as Air Fecteau |
| ICC Air Cargo Canada | | | CIC | | Montréal–Mirabel | 1998 - 2002, also listed as ICC International Cargo Charter |
| Inter-Canadien | | | | | Montréal–Pierre Elliott Trudeau | 1986 - 1999, to Canadian Airlines International |
| Jetsgo | | SG | JGO | JETSGO | Montréal–Pierre Elliott Trudeau | 2001 - 2005, entered bankruptcy protection |
| Maestro | | 5G | SSV | SKYTOUR | Québec City Jean Lesage | 2006 - 2007 |
| Nationair | | NX | NXA | NATION AIRWAYS | Montréal–Mirabel | 1986 - 1993, owned by Nolisair |
| Nolisair | | | | | Montréal–Mirabel | 1984 - 1993, as parent company of Nationair |
| Nordair | | ND | NDR | NORDAIR | Montréal–Trudeau, Montréal–Mirabel | 1947 - 1987, acquired by Canadian Pacific Airlines then merged into Canadian Airlines and Inter-Canadien |
| Quebecair Express | | QO | QAE | | Québec City Jean Lesage | 2003 - 2005 |
| Quebecair | | QB | QBA | QUEBECAIR | Montréal–Trudeau | 1946 - 1987, began as Rimouski Airlines, acquired by CP Air 1986 and consolidated within Canadian Airlines 1987 |
| Royal Aviation | | QN | ROY | ROY | Montréal–Trudeau | 1991 - 2001, acquired by Canada 3000 |
| Trans-Canada Air Lines | | | | | Montréal/Saint-Hubert | 1937 - 1965, now Air Canada |
| Val Air | | VK | | | Montréal–Trudeau | 2003 - 2004 |
| Thomas Cook Airlines Canada | | | | | Montreal | |
