= Rockcliffe Flying Club =

Flying club in Ottawa, Canada

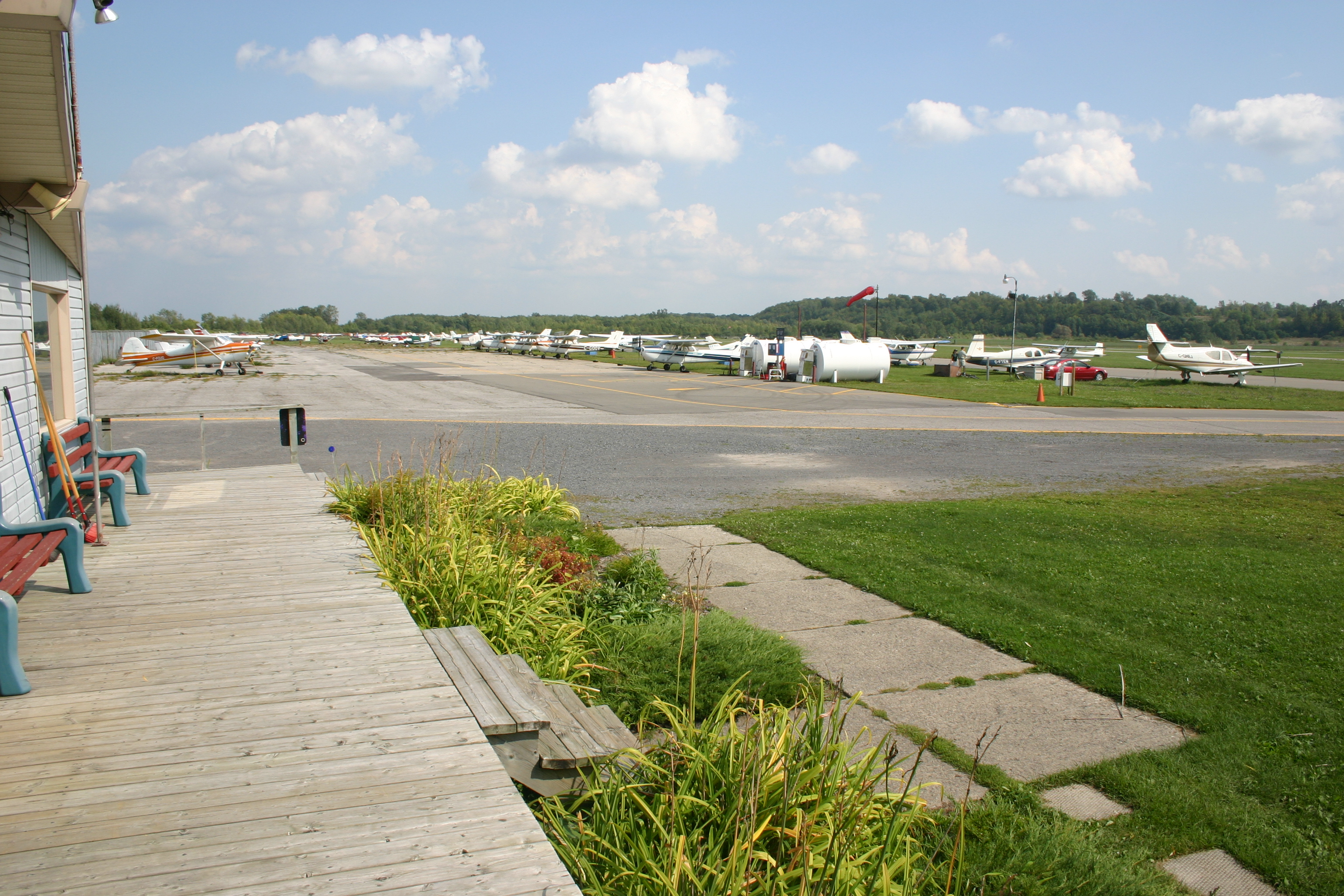
View of the flight line from the Rockcliffe Flying Club porch, September 2006

The Rockcliffe Flying Club is a non-profit flying club based at Ottawa/Rockcliffe Airport in Ottawa, Ontario, Canada.

== History ==
The club was started when Wing Commander Norman Hoye arrived at RCAF Station Rockcliffe with plans to create a military flying club on the base. The club commenced operations on 28 August 1961 with two Aeroncas. At that time the base was an operational RCAF air base with hangars and a control tower. These were all closed when the base was shut down in 1964, but the club remained on the airfield, providing flight instruction and aircraft rental to military personnel and civilians.

== See also ==
- CFB Rockcliffe
- List of airports in the Ottawa area
