= Elling Oliver Weeks =

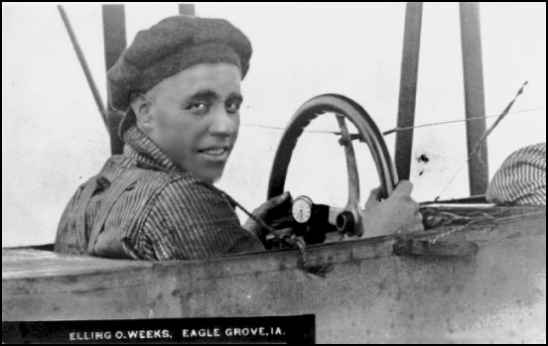
- Weeks circa 1915
- Born: August 23, 1890; Slater, Iowa
- Died: September 10, 1956 (aged 66); Los Angeles, California
- Other names: Elling O. Weeks; E. O. Weeks
- Spouse: Ada May Haukole
- Parent(s): Oliver A. Weeks; Rachel Halverson

Elling Oliver Weeks (August 23, 1890 – September 10, 1956) was a pioneer aviator.

== Biography ==
Weeks was born in Slater, Iowa, to Oliver A. Weeks and Rachel Halverson.

He joined the Aero Club of Illinois in 1911. He then became an exhibition pilot for the Williams Aeroplane Company, operated by Osbert Edwin Williams Jr. of Scranton, Pennsylvania. In 1913 he crashed and broke four ribs and his ankle in Bath, New York.

On January 25, 1917, he married Ada May Haukole (1893-?) in Des Moines, Iowa. She was the daughter of Charles Haukle and Mary Krumm.

Weeks died on September 10, 1956, in Los Angeles, California.
