= RYC =

RYC may refer to

- Redhouse Yacht Club, South Africa
- Royal Yacht Squadron, Isle of Wight, United Kingdom
- Rockcliffe Yacht Club, Canada
- Rosario Youth Club, Northern Irish football club
- R.Y.C. (album), 2020 album by British producer Mura Masa
