= Rockcliffe Yacht Club =

Yacht club in Ottawa, Ontario

Coordinates: 45.46379°N 75.64248°W

- Aerial view of the Rockcliffe Yacht Club, September 2009
- Abbreviation: RYC
- Formation: 1984
- Type: Yacht club Organization based in Canada
- Legal status: active
- Purpose: Recreation
- Headquarters: Ottawa, Ontario, Canada
- Region served: Ottawa, Ontario, Canada
- Members: 100
- Official language: English, French
- Website: www.ryc.ca

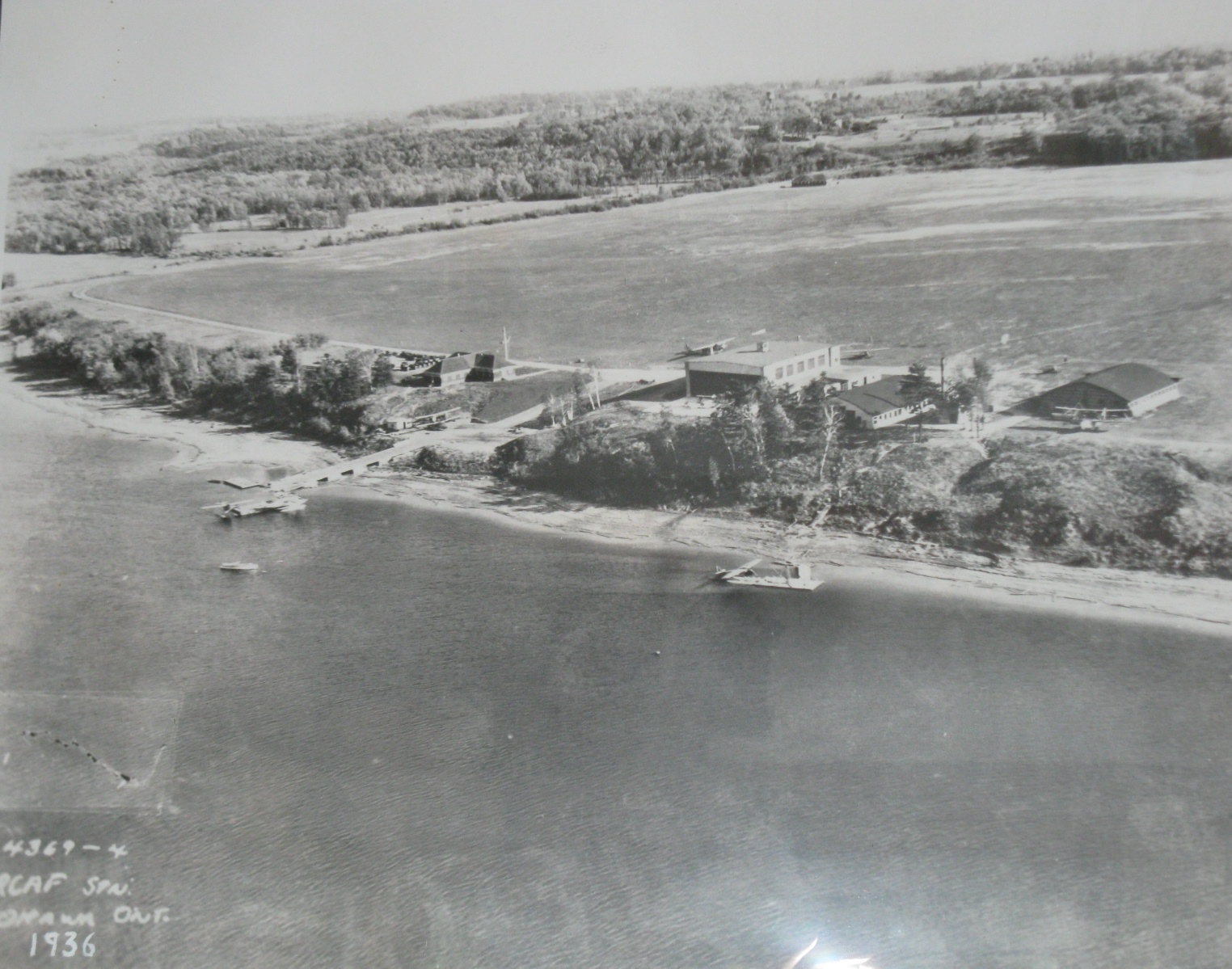
RCAF Station Ottawa, 1936

The Rockcliffe Yacht Club is a non-profit Yacht club based on the south shore of the Ottawa River near the Ottawa/Rockcliffe Airport in Ottawa, Ontario, Canada north of the Canada Aviation Museum. It is a 100-member “private co-op” style club. The club originally was part of CFB Rockcliffe but changed to a private club in 1984. The club is centred on a concrete ramp originally used to launch RCAF sea planes. The ramp extends 50 feet (15 m) into the water as when the ramp was built, in the 1930s, the level of the Ottawa river was much lower. In 1964, a dam was put across the Ottawa River for the Carillon Generating Station which raised the water level by 9 feet (2.7 m). As a result, the Rockcliffe Yacht Club has one of the best launching ramps on the Ottawa river.

== See also ==
- CFB Rockcliffe
