= List of airports in the Ottawa area =

Location in the Ottawa area
Location in Ontario

The following active airports serve the area around Ottawa, Ontario, Canada, lying under or adjacent to Ottawa's terminal control area:

== Land airports ==
=== Scheduled commercial airline service ===
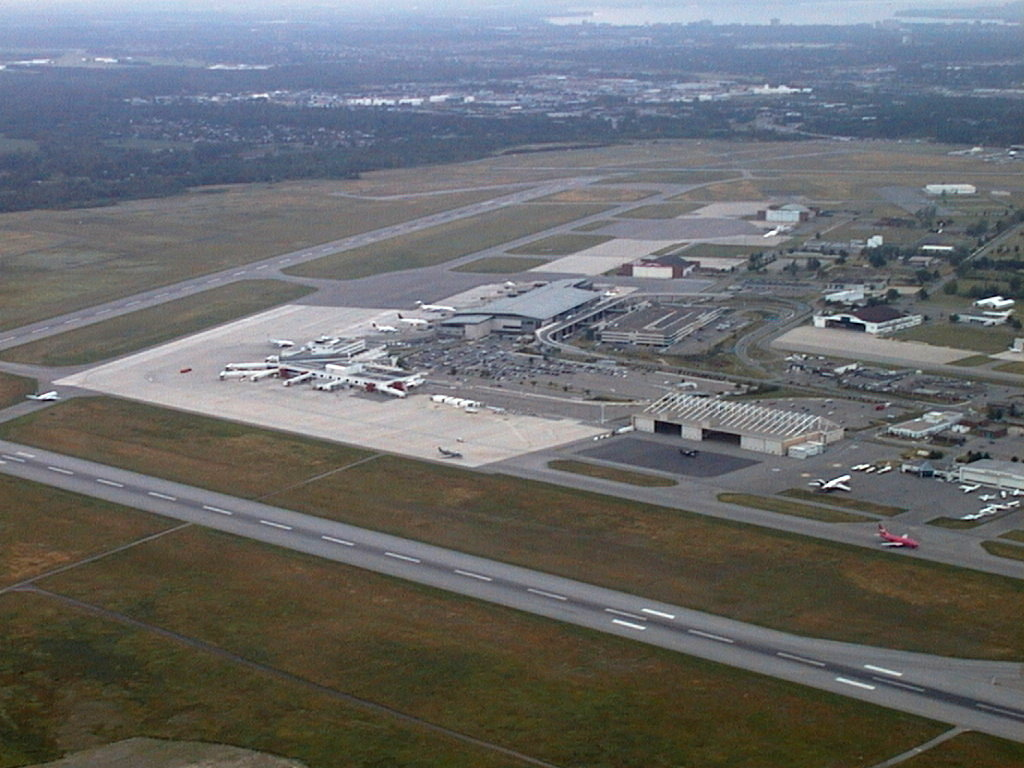
Ottawa Macdonald–Cartier International Airport

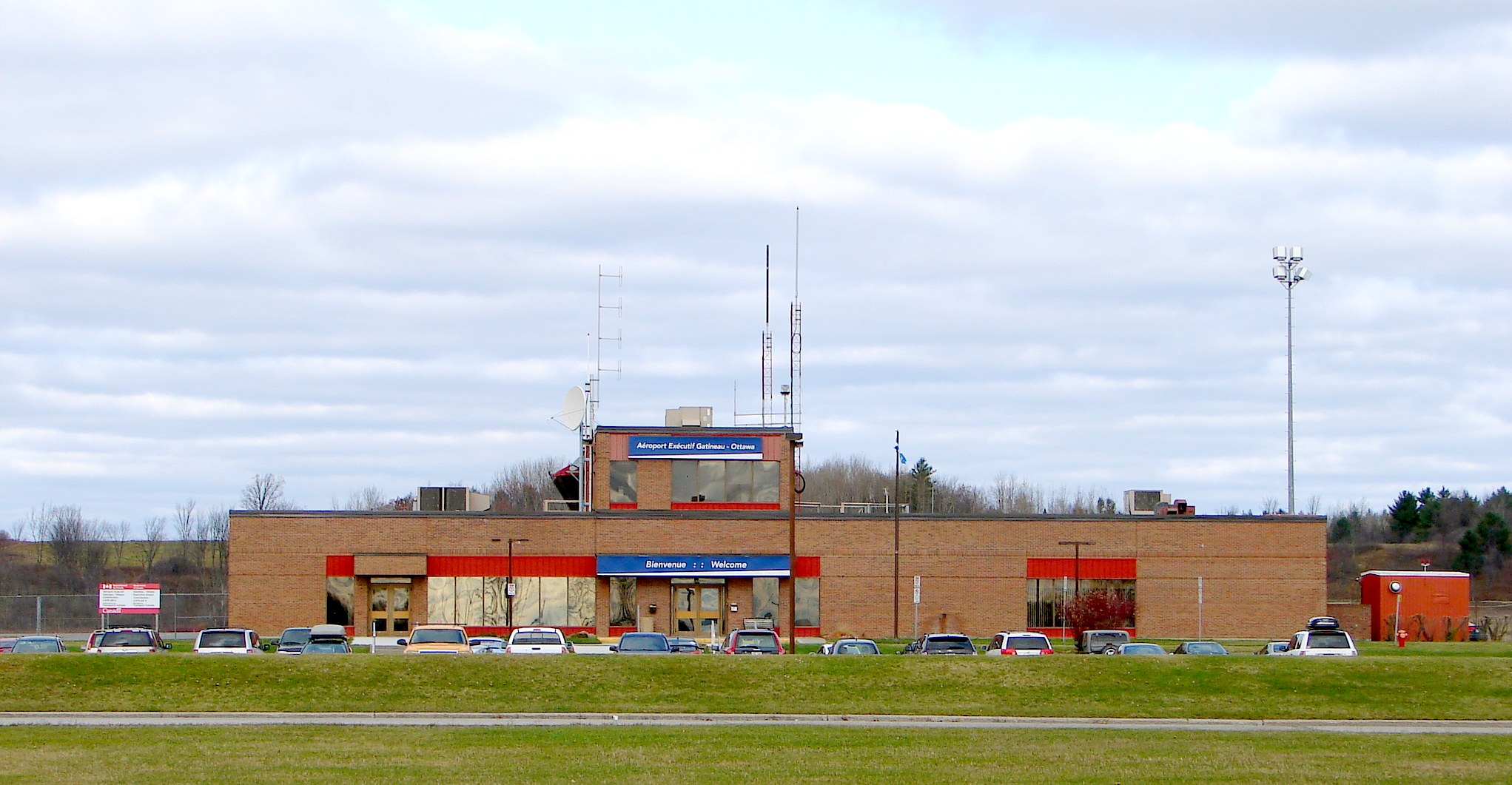
Gatineau-Ottawa Executive Airport

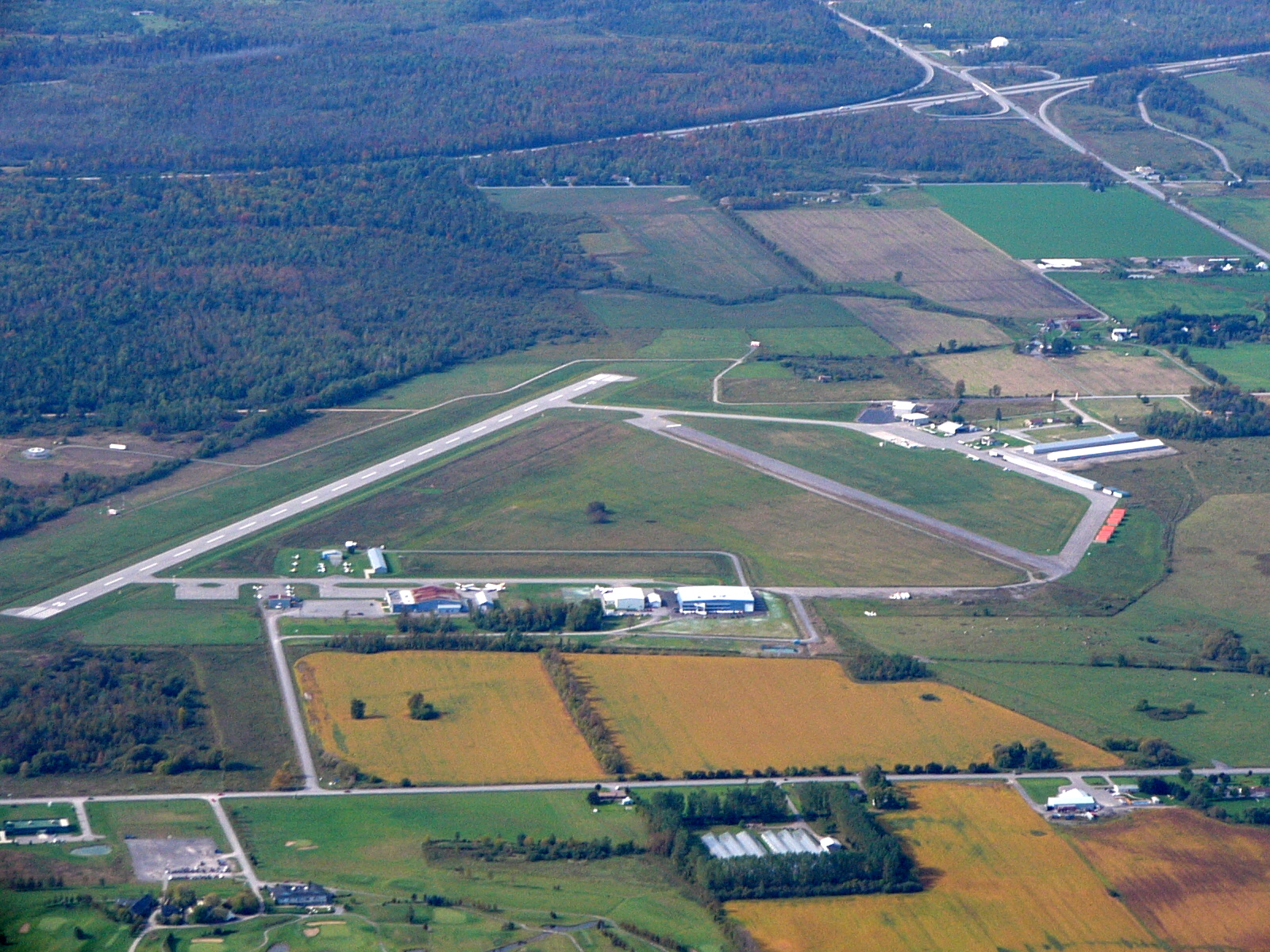
Carp Airport

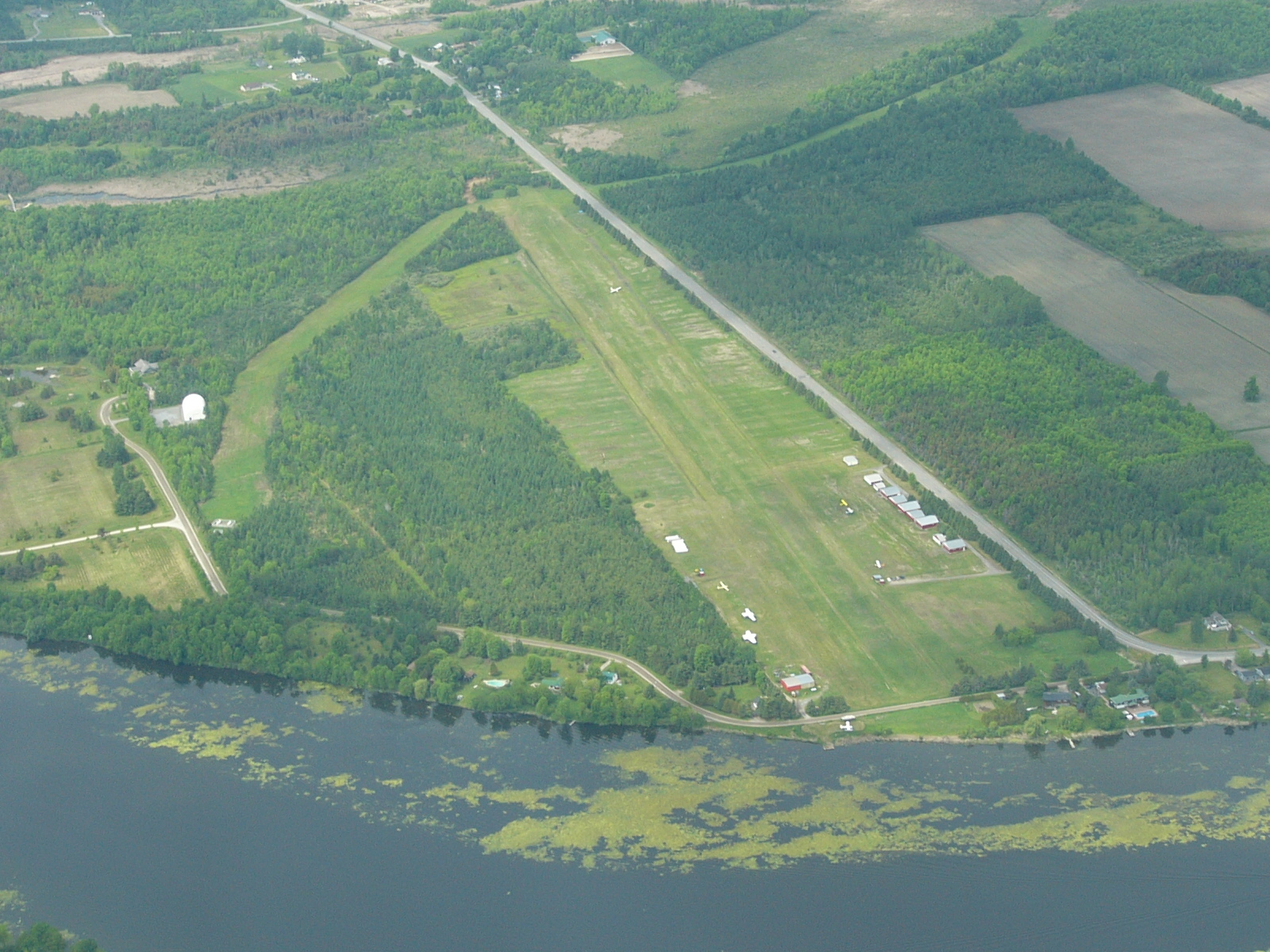
Kars/Rideau Valley Air Park

| Airport name | ICAO/TC LID/IATA | Location | Coordinates |
|---|---|---|---|
| Ottawa Macdonald–Cartier International Airport | CYOW (YOW) | Ottawa | 45°19′21″N 075°40′09″W |

=== Other ===
| Airport name | ICAO/TC LID/IATA | Location | Coordinates |
|---|---|---|---|
| Arnprior Airport | CNP3 | Arnprior | 45°24′49″N 076°21′57″W |
| Carleton Place Airport | CNR6 | Carleton Place | 45°06′14″N 076°07′24″W |
| Carp Airport | CYRP (YRP) | Carp | 45°19′21″N 076°01′20″W |
| Gatineau-Ottawa Executive Airport | CYND (YND) | Gatineau, Quebec | 45°31′17″N 075°33′51″W |
| Kars/Rideau Valley Air Park | CPL3 | Kars | 45°06′00″N 075°38′00″W |
| Ottawa/Casselman (Shea Field) Aerodrome | CSF7 | Casselman | 45°17′59″N 075°10′17″W |
| Ottawa/Embrun Aerodrome | CPR2 | Embrun | 45°14′28″N 075°17′55″W |
| Ottawa/Manotick (Hope Field) Aerodrome | CHF2 | Manotick | 45°11′26″N 075°42′31″W |
| Ottawa/Rockcliffe Airport | CYRO (YRO) | Ottawa | 45°27′37″N 075°38′46″W |
| Pendleton Airport | CNF3 | Pendleton | 45°29′10″N 075°05′46″W |
| Smiths Falls-Montague Airport | CYSH (YSH) | Smiths Falls | 44°56′45″N 075°56′26″W |

Macdonald-Cartier handles all of the scheduled passenger service for Ottawa, in addition to a large amount of general aviation and some military traffic. The remaining airports serve almost exclusively general aviation. Macdonald-Cartier, Gatineau, Carp, Smiths Falls, and Arnprior have instrument approaches and winter maintenance for year-round, all-weather operations.

== Water aerodromes ==
| Airport name | ICAO/TC LID/IATA | Location | Coordinates |
|---|---|---|---|
| Arnprior Water Aerodrome | CNB5 | Arnprior | 45°24′27″N 076°21′35″W |
| Blue Sea Lake (Outaouais Aviation) Water Aerodrome | CBS6 | Blue Sea Lake | 46°11′47″N 076°03′28″W |
| Constance Lake Water Aerodrome | CNQ5 | Constance Lake, Ottawa | 45°24′10″N 075°58′32″W |
| Ottawa/Rockcliffe Water Aerodrome | CTR7 | Ottawa | 45°27′47″N 075°38′47″W |
| Rivière Blanche/Cardinal Aviation Water Aerodrome | CRB7 | Gatineau, Quebec | 45°32′51″N 075°37′40″W |

== Heliports ==
| Airport name | ICAO/TC LID/IATA | Location | Coordinates |
|---|---|---|---|
| Carleton Place (District Memorial Hospital) Heliport | CPN7 | Carleton Place | 45°08′32″N 076°08′16″W |
| Ottawa/Gatineau (Casino) Heliport | CTA9 | Gatineau, Quebec | 45°26′47″N 075°43′35″W |
| Ottawa (Children's Hospital) Heliport | CPK7 | Ottawa | 45°24′04″N 075°39′01″W |
| Ottawa (Civic Hospital) Heliport | CPP7 | Ottawa | 45°23′30″N 075°43′14″W |
| Ottawa/Dwyer Hill Heliport | CYDH | Ottawa | 45°07′50″N 075°56′54″W |
| Ottawa/Questral Helicopters | CQH2 | Ottawa | 45°17′57″N 075°30′00″W |
| Ottawa (Winchester District Memorial Hospital) Heliport | CWH4 | Winchester | 45°05′17″N 075°21′16″W |
| Smiths Falls (Community Hospital) Heliport | CNS9 | Smiths Falls | 44°54′26″N 076°01′38″W |

== See also ==
- List of airports in the Greater Toronto Area
