= CFB Rockcliffe =

Former Canadian Forces Base in Ontario

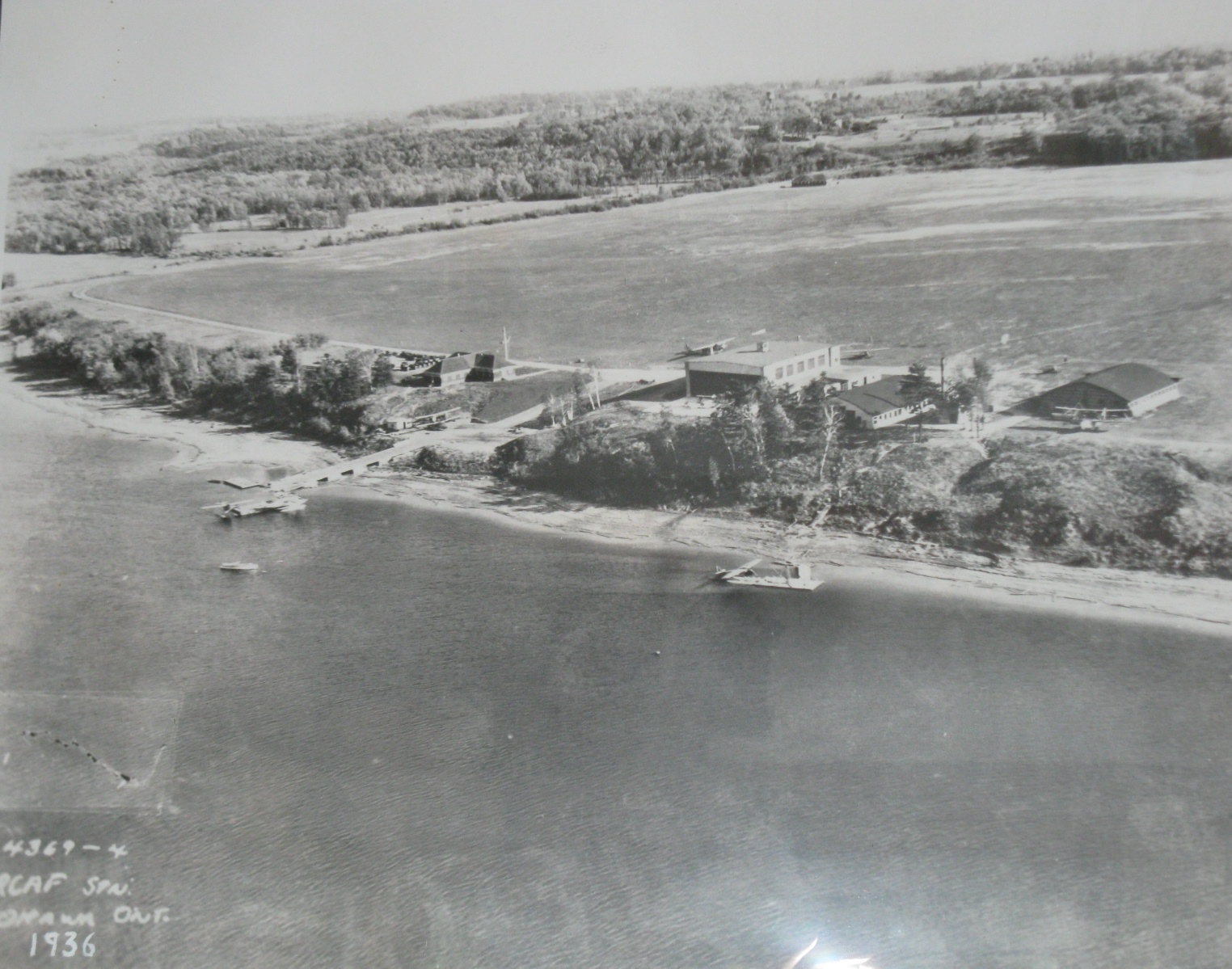
- RCAF Station Ottawa, 1936
- IATA: none; ICAO: none

Summary
- Operator: Royal Canadian Air Force (RCAF)
- Location: Rockcliffe Park, Ontario
- Opened: 1918
- Closed: 2009
- Coordinates: 45°27′37″N 75°38′34″W
- Interactive map of CFB Rockcliffe

Canadian Forces Base Rockcliffe (also CFB Rockcliffe) is a former Canadian Forces Base located in the eastern part of Ottawa, Ontario, now used for Ottawa/Rockcliffe Airport and the Canada Aviation and Space Museum.

It was known for a time as CFB Ottawa North, with CFB Uplands becoming CFB Ottawa South, when the two airfields were administratively merged into CFB Ottawa in 1972.

== Early history ==
In 1918 the Royal Air Force sought a flying field in the Ottawa area for experimental mail flights. A field behind a military rifle range located on the banks of the Ottawa River in Rockcliffe Park, several kilometres downstream from Ottawa was converted to an airstrip and became known as the Rockcliffe Air Station.

After the Canadian Parliament's 1920 Air Regulations came into effect, the Rockcliffe Air Station was chosen as an ideal site for supporting both an air harbour and a flying field. The Ottawa Air Station was one of five stations established by the Canadian Air Board's Flying Operations Branch during its first summer of operations in 1920. Major activities conducted by the Air Board at the Ottawa Air Station included military aerial photography for topographic mapping in Canada, air transportation, and aeronautical experimentation. The airport also served as a major centre for early aircraft testing.

In 1922 the civilian components of the Air Board began to consolidate into the Canadian Air Force, which became part of the newly established Department of National Defence the following year and was renamed the Royal Canadian Air Force (RCAF) in 1924. Thus the facility gained the second-longest association with the nation's air defence after RCAF Station Borden. After a few name changes, the facility took the name RCAF Station Ottawa in 1936. In 1940, this name would change again to RCAF Station Rockcliffe.

On March 12, 1930, Canadian World War I flying ace William George Barker crashed into the Ottawa River and died during an aerial demonstration over the field. In July 1931, Charles Lindbergh and Anne Morrow Lindbergh visited the airport during their northern surveying tour.

== Second World War ==
The airfield's runways were paved in 1939 in preparation for operations during World War II. RCAF Station Rockcliffe participated in the British Commonwealth Air Training Plan and — as the nearest airport to the centre of the capital — was involved in many other kinds of testing, training, and transport operations, including the transport of mail to Europe using B-17 Flying Fortresses and B-24 Liberators. Immediately after the war, in September 1945, RCAF Station Rockcliffe was the site of the first jet aircraft demonstration in Canada.

In approximately 1942 the aerodrome was listed as RCAF Aerodrome - Rockcliffe, Ontario at 45°28′N 75°38′W with a variation of 14 degrees west and elevation of 175 ft (53 m). Three runways were listed as follows:

Runway Name	Length	Width	Surface
9/27	4,000 ft (1,200 m)	150 ft (46 m)	Hard surfaced
4/22	3,500 ft (1,100 m)	150 ft (46 m)	Hard surfaced
15/33	2,980 ft (910 m)	150 ft (46 m)	Hard surfaced

== Postwar ==
The plaque to Canada's Air Force for providing humanitarian aid to Poland at the end of World War II had been placed at CFB Rockcliffe from 1947 until 1994 when the base was shut down. In 2007, The Polish Embassy rededicated the plaque during a ceremony held at the Our Lady of the Airways Chapel at the entrance of CFB Uplands.

In 1957, the military's main flight testing and development operations moved to RCAF Station Uplands (now located at Ottawa Macdonald–Cartier International Airport). In 1964 the RCAF ceased flying operations at the base; however it saw continued use as an administrative and logistics base. The airfield passed back into civilian control and the Rockcliffe Flying Club began using the field.

After unification of all three branches into the Canadian Forces in 1968, RCAF Station Rockcliffe was redesignated Canadian Forces Base Rockcliffe (CFB Rockcliffe). In 1972 it was renamed CFB Ottawa (North) as part of the amalgamation of DND property in the national capital region into CFB Ottawa. Rockcliffe saw continuous downgrades through the 1970s and 1980s, being reduced to largely providing housing for Canadian Forces personnel posted to the national capital region, including the Public Duties Detachment (now the Ceremonial Guard).

The military presence at Rockcliffe was terminated in 1994 following post-Cold War defence cuts and the base was decommissioned although Canadian Forces personnel continued to stay in housing on the former base property as it transitioned to ownership under the federal government's surplus lands development agency, the Canada Lands Company (CLC).

In 2006 CLC announced that the base was to be developed by private interests (excluding the Ottawa/Rockliffe Airport) with a comprehensive proposal for condominiums and complementary residential developments.

In 2007 a native land claim was launched by the Algonquins of Ontario, halting any progress on the transfer or sale of the lands until the claim had been settled. Work on the cleanup and demolition of the former base continued, however.

By 2009, the Canadian Forces had completely departed from Rockcliffe. Most RCAF buildings had been demolished by this time, although some of the abandoned military housing remains; mothballed for potential future use. As of October 13, 2009 the roads leading into CFB Rockcliffe were permanently closed off and access to the base is no longer possible. After several decontamination and repair operations are completed, it is expected the property will be sold to private interests for future development as previously announced, although the topic remains uncertain and still causes much debate.

The airfield is currently operated as Rockcliffe Airport by the Rockcliffe Flying Club. The Canada Aviation and Space Museum is located on the old flight line with the airport also being used for delivering aircraft to the museum's collection.

On March 25, 2011, the native land claim which had been launched in 2007 was reported as being settled. As part of a larger agreement regarding Algonquin rights in Ontario, the Algonquins of Ontario would receive 10 million dollars in financial compensation and would have a say into future development plans for the former base. Although final approval is pending, this last major hurdle has essentially been removed and the land is expected to be transferred from DND to CLC within 2–3 years.

All air force buildings and houses have since been torn down. As of 2011 the lands have been owned by Canada Lands Company, and housing is being developed, with development on-going. Currently 92 acres of the land have been developed into housing, and 2 city parks.
