= Air Fecteau =

Canadian airline (1936–1981)

- Commenced operations: 1936
- Ceased operations: 1981

Air Fecteau was an airline that operated primarily in Quebec, Canada.

== History ==
The airline was established in 1936 as A. Fecteau Transport Aerien by Arthur Fecteau. He first had a Travel Air 2000 that he fixed with his older brother Joseph. After some time he got a Junkers W 34, a de Havilland Fox Moth and, later, a Noorduyn Norseman. Fecteau was offering air charters from Senneterre across the northern Abitibi region. Getting bigger, he bought new bush planes on the market like the DHC Beaver and DHC Otter. In 1973 it was renamed simply Air Fecteau and in 1983 was acquired by La Sarre Air Services to form Propair.

=== Arthur Fecteau ===
Arthur Fecteau (1910-1987) born in Saint-Marie-de-Beauce, Canada, started his pilot career in 1930, at the Aérodrome du Bois Gomin, after his brother Joseph. In 1936, the two brothers were offering airplane rides. Joseph went in the Côte-Nord area and Arthur the Abitibi region.

== Fleet ==
Aircraft operated throughout Air Fecteau's operation:

- Travel Air 2000
- de Havilland Fox Moth
- Junkers W 34
- Noorduyn Norseman
- de Havilland Beaver
- de Havilland Otter
- Cessna 180
- Douglas DC-3

== See also ==
- List of defunct airlines of Canada
