= Laurentian Air Services =

Canadian Airline

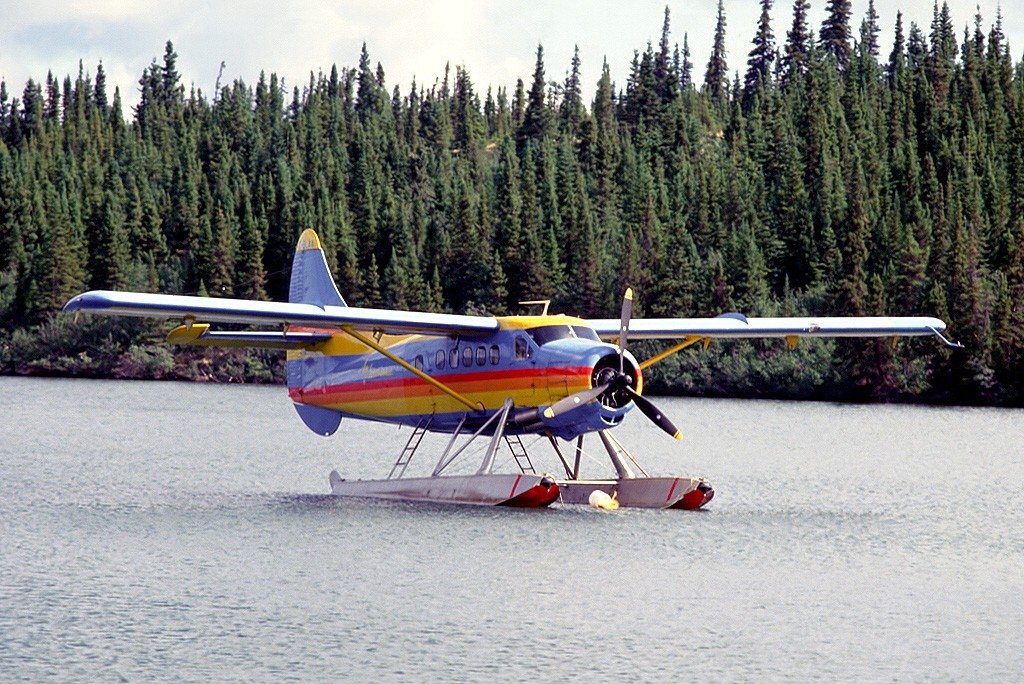
- LAS owned Air Schefferville; this Air Schefferville DHC 3 Otter was a part of the Air Schefferville Fleet
IATA	ICAO	Call sign
-	-	-
- Founded: 1936
- Ceased operations: 1998 (dissolved on 02 Feb 2004)
- Operating bases: Ottawa
- Hubs: Schefferville
- Subsidiaries: Air Schefferville, B-M Aviation
- Key people: John Munroe Bogie, Barnet McLaren
- Founders: A. Barnet Maclaren and Walter Deisher
- Employees: See personnel list

Laurentian Air Services was a Canadian airline that existed from 1936 to 1998. It owned Air Schefferville, and one of its pilots became associated with the company, eventually becoming president. It operated many bush planes as a STOL operation. Laurentian Air Services participated in the James Bay Project. Despite ceasing operations in 1998, Laurentian was officially dissolved in 2004.

== History ==
Laurentian Air Services was founded in 1936. It was based out of Ottawa's Hunt Club Field in Ottawa, and it managed to grow an excellent reputation by the 1940s, which led to a Grumman Goose flying for a 19-day trip for the Hudson's Bay Compony. The aircraft CF-BXR was a Grumman Goose purchased by Laurentian at the end of World War II.

The trip began on July 28, 1949, and flew over rugged terrain. In 1952 the company opened a base in Maniwaki and acquired planes like the Cessna Crane, Grumman Goose, and Beaver. By the 1960s, they had flown from Schefferville, Ottawa, and Lac des Loups. In the 1970s, they lost three aircraft: two C 47 aircraft and a DHC 2, two in 1975 within a few months of each other.

In 1976, they bought a DHC 6 aircraft, and leased two DHC 6 aircraft from Wardair Canada. Laureatian Air Services also provided similar services for the massive James Bay Project in the 1970s, which saw multiple reservoirs, waterways, and cost tens of billions of dollars. In the 1980s, Laurentian Air Services established Air Schefferville, with its manager being part of the Bogie family, who now were running LAS.

Laurentian brought in two new companies: Laurentian Ungava Outfitters and Delay River Outfitters. To service isolated northern areas more efficiently, it created Air Schefferville.

Laurentian Air Services was shut down in 1998 after stiffer competition, the Schefferville mines closing, and cash shortages. The airline was the focus of a book published in 2009 called For the Love of Flying.

== Air Schefferville ==
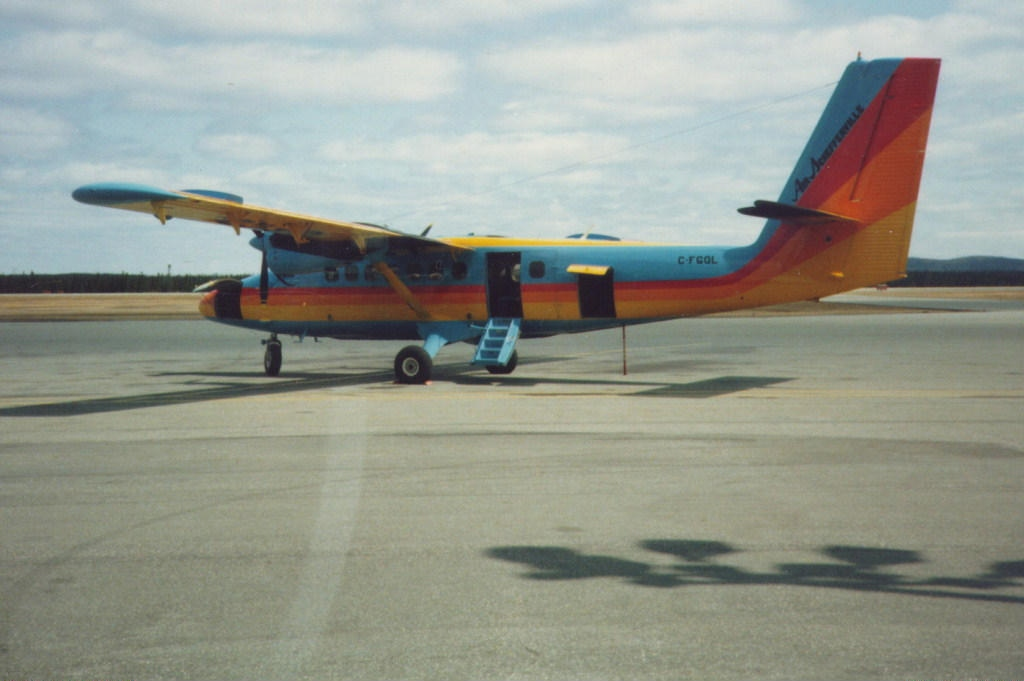
Air Schefferville De Havilland Canada DHC-6-200 Twin Otter

Air Schefferville was created in 1981 to serve Laurentian Air Services' outfitting and passenger needs in Schefferville. It acted as a feeder airline for Quebecair. It operated planes like the DHC 2, DHC 3, DHC 6 and Beech 99. Air Schefferville ceased operations in 1999 one year after LAS ceased operations. A total of 105 Beavers went through the fleet.

== B-M Aviation ==
B-M Aviation was another airline founded by John Munroe Bogie that sold Beavers across Canada. Over 64 Beavers were put up for auction in France that landed at B-M Aviation. B-M Aviation existed until 1978 with a partner known as Colin McOuat.

== Fleet ==
- DC 3
- DHC 3
- C 47
- Beech 99
- DHC 2
- DHC 6
- Grumman Goose
- Cessna Crane
- Puss Moth
- Float equipped Waco
- Beech 200 Super King Air
- Beech 18

== Key destinations ==
These are the key destinations that were served by LAS. This is not the full list of destinations

- Ottawa's Hunt Club Field
- Schefferville
- Lac des Loups
- Maniwaki

== Accidents and incidents ==
Laurentian Air Services had at least 3 accidents two of which were involved is less than 2 months.

- On September 25, 1975, a Douglas C 47 struck a snowdrift and spun out of control.
- On August 7, 1975, a DHC 2 twin otter crashed into a lake killing all 4 people onboard
- On August 5, 1974, a C 47 crashed into the mountains killing 5 out of the 11 people due to a controlled flight into terrain
