= J. Thad Johnson =

American army officer and aviator (1893-1927)

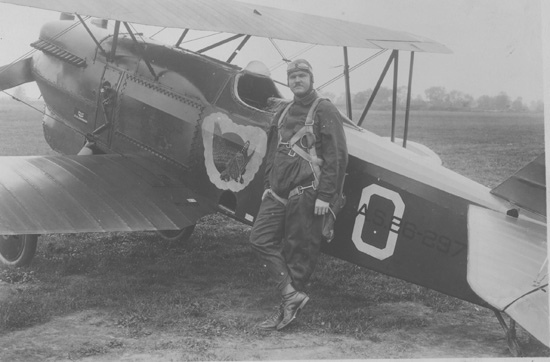
Thad Johnson

J. Thad Johnson (1893-1927) was an American army officer and aviator who was killed while escorting Charles A. Lindbergh to Ottawa for Diamond Jubilee celebrations marking the 60th anniversary of Canadian Confederation.

== Background ==
John Thad Johnson was born in Johnson City, Texas, on July 19, 1893, son of R. B. Johnson and his wife Arthusa (Barker) Johnson. He studied theology at Trinity University in Waxahachie, Texas before enrolling in the Williams School of Aviation operated by aviation pioneer O. E. Williams in Fenton, Michigan. He joined the U.S. Army, serving in the Signal Corps and later the U.S. Army Air Service in World War I. A week after the armistice that ended the war he married Edith May Naylor (1900-1924) in Frederick, Oklahoma on November 18, 1919. He was promoted to the rank of First Lieutenant in 1920. After Edith Johnson's untimely death, he married Mildred Faye Adams, reputedly a descendant of President John Quincy Adams in Fenton, Michigan on October 24, 1925.

On July 2, 1927 Lieutenant Johnson flew his Curtiss P-1 Hawk bi-plane from Selfridge Field, near Detroit, Michigan, as part of a twelve-plane escort for Lindbergh on his visit to the Canadian capital, the first stop on a three-month long public relations tour across North America. While attempting a landing at Hunt Club Field, the tail of Johnson's plane was clipped by the propeller of another aircraft in the formation. Johnson was able to parachute from his plane before it crashed but was too close to the ground for the chute to successfully deploy and was killed on impact.

Thousands lined the streets of Ottawa for his funeral procession to Union Station and Lindbergh flew over the funeral train dropping flowers from the Spirit of St. Louis. Johnson was buried in Oakwood Cemetery in his adopted hometown of Fenton, Michigan. Thad Johnson Private, a road adjacent to the airport that grew around the old Hunt Club Field, is named in his honor.
