= Maestro (airline) =

Airline based in Sainte-Foy, Quebec City, Canada

IATA	ICAO	Call sign
5G	SSV	Skytour
- Founded: 2006
- Ceased operations: 2007
- Hubs: Quebec City Jean-Lesage Int'l Airport
- Fleet size: 1
- Destinations: 14
- Parent company: Vacances Maestro
- Headquarters: Quebec City, Quebec
- Key people: Michel Mordret (President)

Maestro (also known informally as Air Maestro) was an airline based in Sainte-Foy, Quebec City, Canada. It operated charter services.

The airline ceased operations on 7 March 2007, after a decision was made to halt all flights because of overcapacity in the Quebec market.

== History ==
Maestro was established in April 2006 and started operations on 12 December 2006. It was a privately funded start-up airline and the exclusive carrier of tour operator Vacances Maestro, based in Quebec City. Its logo was an airplane empennage over an inclined white Fleur-de-lis, which symbolizes both Quebec and Quebec City. On March 7, 2007, the company announced its bankruptcy and closed definitively.

== Destinations ==
As of March 2007, Maestro operated flights to:

- Acapulco (Acapulco International Airport)
- Cayo Coco (Cayo Coco Airport)
- Fort-de-France (Le Lamentin Airport)
- Fort Lauderdale (Fort Lauderdale-Hollywood International Airport)
- Holguín (Frank País Airport)
- La Romana (La Romana International Airport)
- Panama City (Tocumen International Airport)
- Pointe-à-Pitre (Pointe-à-Pitre International Airport)
- Porlamar/Isla Margarita
- Quebec City (Québec/Jean Lesage International Airport) hub
- Samaná (Samaná El Catey International Airport)
- San Andres (Gustavo Rojas Pinilla International Airport)
- Santa Clara/Cayo Santa Maria (Abel Santa María Airport)
- Varadero (Juan Gualberto Gómez Airport)

== Fleet ==
Skyservice Airlines operated all Maestro flights using a Boeing 757-200ER aircraft.

== See also ==
- List of defunct airlines of Canada
