= Osbert Edwin Williams Jr. =

- Born: December 15, 1875; Webster Township, Michigan
- Died: October 25, 1917 (aged 41); Mobile, Alabama
- Other names: O. E. Williams; Bert Williams
- Spouse: Inez Augusta Blessing (1878-1920) (m. 1904)
- Parent: Osbert Edwin Williams Sr.

Osbert Edwin Williams Jr. (December 15, 1875 – October 25, 1917) was a Michigan-born pioneer aviator, engineer, and safety advocate. Williams established the first aviation flight training school in the state of Michigan, the Williams Aeroplane Company, in Fenton, Genesee County.

== Biography ==
Williams was born on December 15, 1875, in Webster Township, Michigan to Osbert Edwin Williams Sr. and Sarah E. Williams (née Cook).

Williams died on October 25, 1917, in Mobile, Alabama.

== Students ==
Some of his students died in crashes or served in World War I. Notable students are listed below:

- Lieutenant Cyrus K. Bettis (1893–1926) served in World War I
- Lieutenant John Thad Johnson (1893–1927) served in World War I
