= Aérodrome Saint-Louis =

Former aerodrome in Sainte-Foy, Quebec City in Canada

- IATA: none; ICAO: none

Summary
- Airport type: Defunct
- Serves: Quebec City
- Location: Sainte-Foy, Quebec City in Canada
- Opened: 1928
- Closed: 1938
- Coordinates: 46°46′19″N 071°16′56″W

Map
- Location within Quebec

The Aérodrome Saint-Louis, also called Aérodrome du Bois Gomin or Canadian Transcontinental Airways Airport, was the first airfield of the Quebec City area of Quebec, Canada. It was located in the suburb of Sainte-Foy.

== History ==
Aérodrome Saint-Louis was established by Canadian Transcontinental Airways (1927–38) (Compagnie Aérienne Transcontinentale) in 1928 in the fields between Cap-Rouge Road (now called Chemin Saint-Louis) and Gomin Road (Chemin Gomin), east of the Route de l'Église where the Laurier Québec and Place Sainte-Foy shopping centres are currently located. It was used during winter to transport mail between Montreal and Rimouski.

It was closed in 1938, when Canadian Transcontinental Airways ceased operations, and in 1939 a new airfield was established in Quebec City; Aéroport de l'Ancienne Lorette, today known as Québec City Jean Lesage International Airport.

== See also ==
- List of airports in Canada
- Québec/Lac Saint-Augustin Water Airport
