= Victoria STOLport =

Former aerodrome in Montreal, Quebec

- IATA: YMY; ICAO: CYMY

Summary
- Owner: Government of Canada
- Serves: Montreal
- Location: Montreal, Quebec
- Time zone: EST (UTC−05:00)
  - Summer (DST): EDT (UTC−04:00)
- Coordinates: 45°28′59″N 73°32′26″W

Map
- Location in Quebec

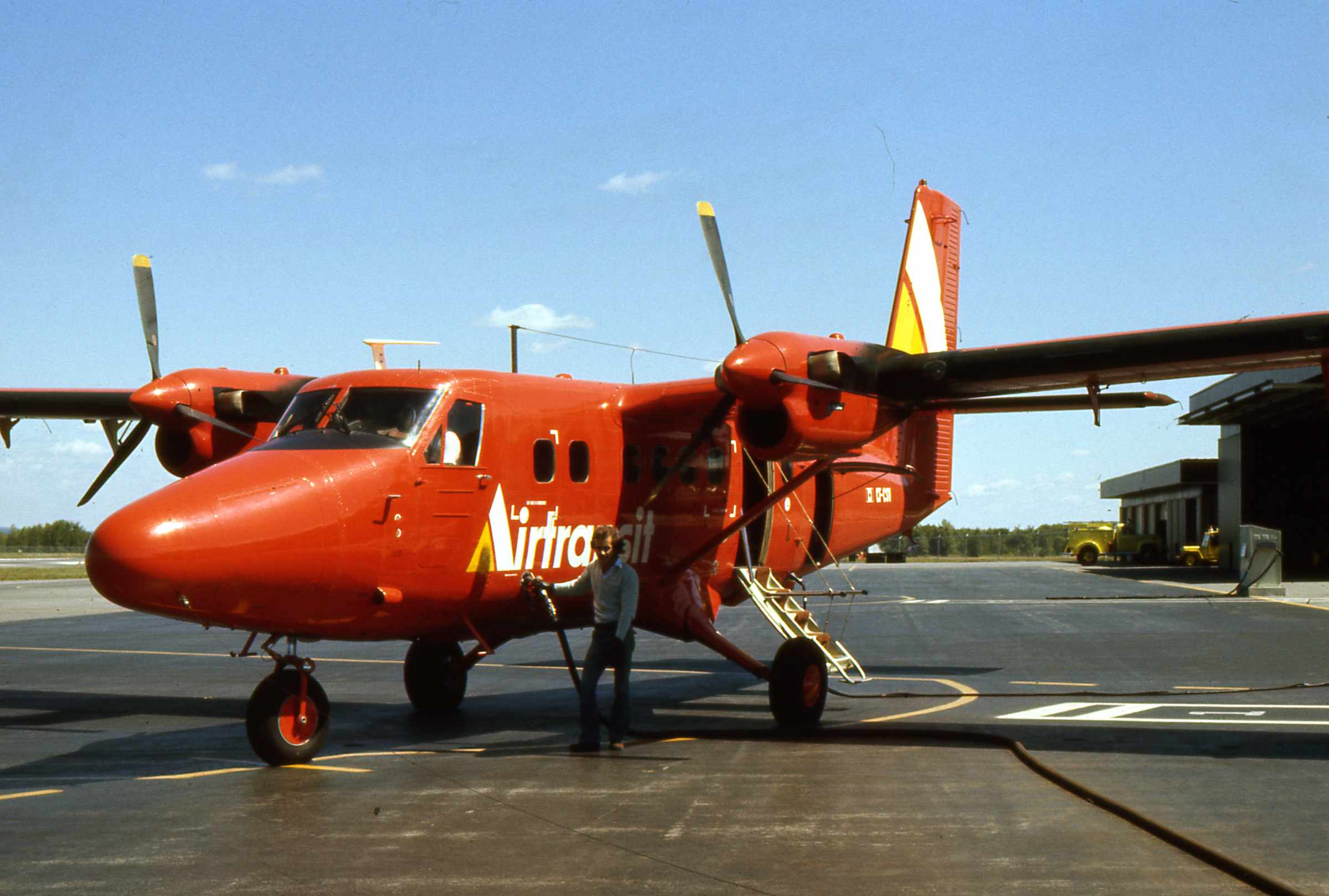
One of the six Airtransit DHC-6 Twin Otter refuelling at Ottawa Rockcliffe Airport in 1975

Victoria STOLport (IATA: YMY, ICAO: CYMY) was a short take-off and landing aerodrome near downtown Montreal during the mid-1970s. The STOLport had been constructed on the former parking lot for Expo 67. The airport operated a two-year STOL demonstration service, with the participation of the Ministry of Transportation, the Canadian Air Transport Administration and other Federal Agencies in order to obtain and evaluate the data on passengers and economics of the STOL service. The choice of the route fell on the Montreal – Ottawa corridor, between which 2.5 million people travelled every year.

The STOLport in Ottawa was Rockcliffe Airport because of its proximity to downtown. Airtransit Canada, a wholly owned subsidiary of Air Canada was incorporated on June 19, 1973 with six de Havilland DHC-6-300 (M.O.T.) Twin Otter, registered as CF-CST, CF-CSU, CF-CSV, CF-CSW, CF-CSX, CF-CSY, while regular flights started in early 1974. At the end of the demonstration, the service was discontinued and the STOLport decommissioned and eventually turned into the Montreal Technoparc technology park.

== Airport code ==
The airport's IATA code, YMY, currently identifies Montreal's Central Station main passenger rail station.

== See also ==
- List of abandoned airports in Canada
