= Ottawa/Rockcliffe Airport =

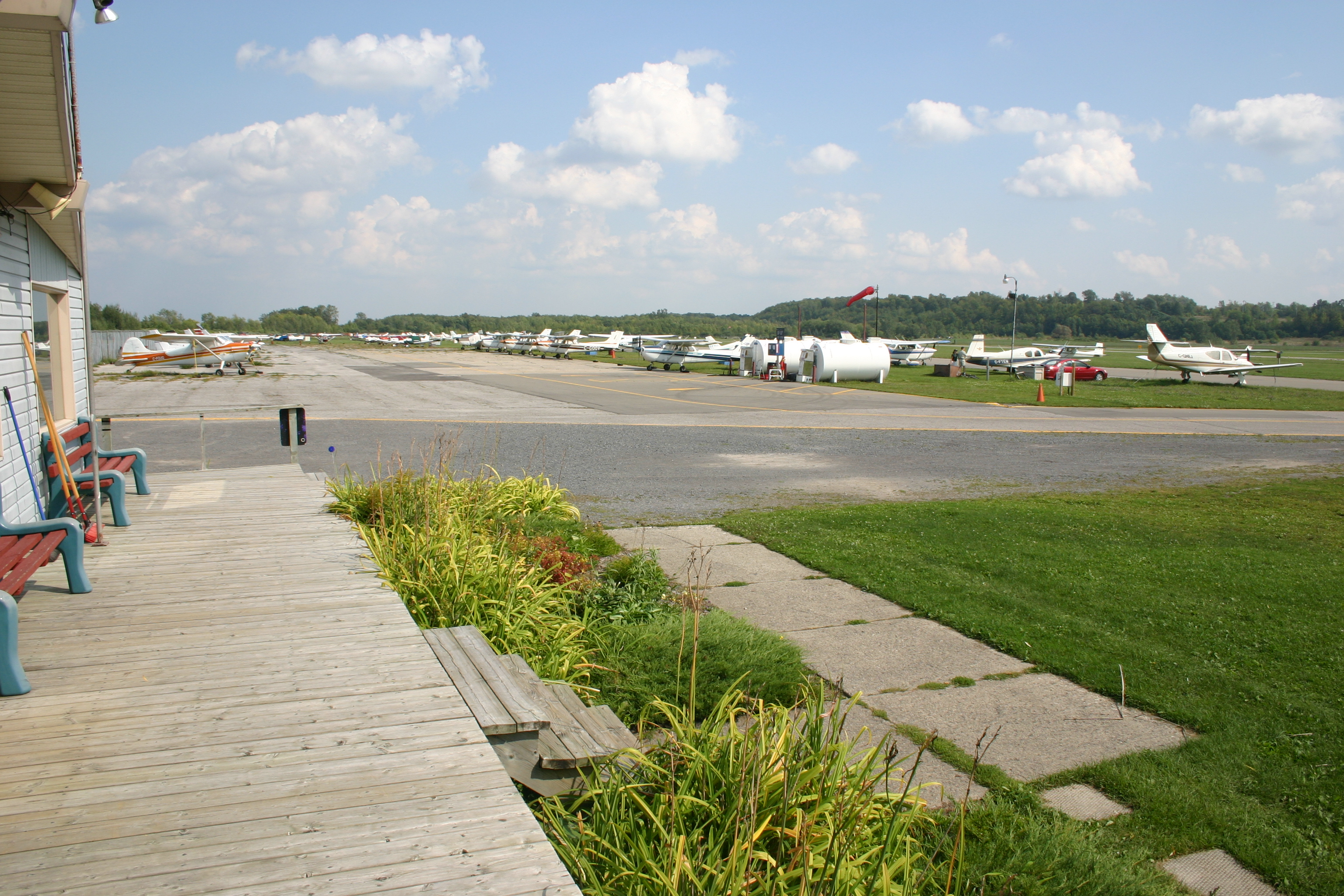
- IATA: YRO; ICAO: CYRO

Summary
- Airport type: Public
- Operator: Rockcliffe Flying Club
- Location: Ottawa, Ontario
- Time zone: EST (UTC−05:00)
  - Summer (DST): EDT (UTC−04:00)
- Elevation AMSL: 184 ft (56 m)
- Coordinates: 45°27′38″N 075°38′36″W
- Website: Rockcliffe Flying Club

Map
- Location in Ontario CYRO (Canada)

Runways
Direction	Length		Surface
Direction	ft	m	Surface
09/27	3,319	1,012	Asphalt
- Source: Canada Flight Supplement

Ottawa/Rockcliffe Airport or Rockcliffe Airport (IATA: YRO, ICAO: CYRO), a former military base, is a non-towered airport located on the south shore of the Ottawa River, 4 nautical miles (7.4 km; 4.6 mi) northeast of Downtown Ottawa, Ontario, Canada. The airport is the home of the Canada Aviation and Space Museum, which owns the field, and is used and maintained by the Rockcliffe Flying Club. In August 2018, on the 100th anniversary of its use as an airfield, it was officially recognized as Canada's oldest active airport.

The primary seaplane base for the National Capital Region, the Ottawa/Rockcliffe Water Aerodrome is located adjacent to Airport and is also operated by the Rockcliffe Flying Club.

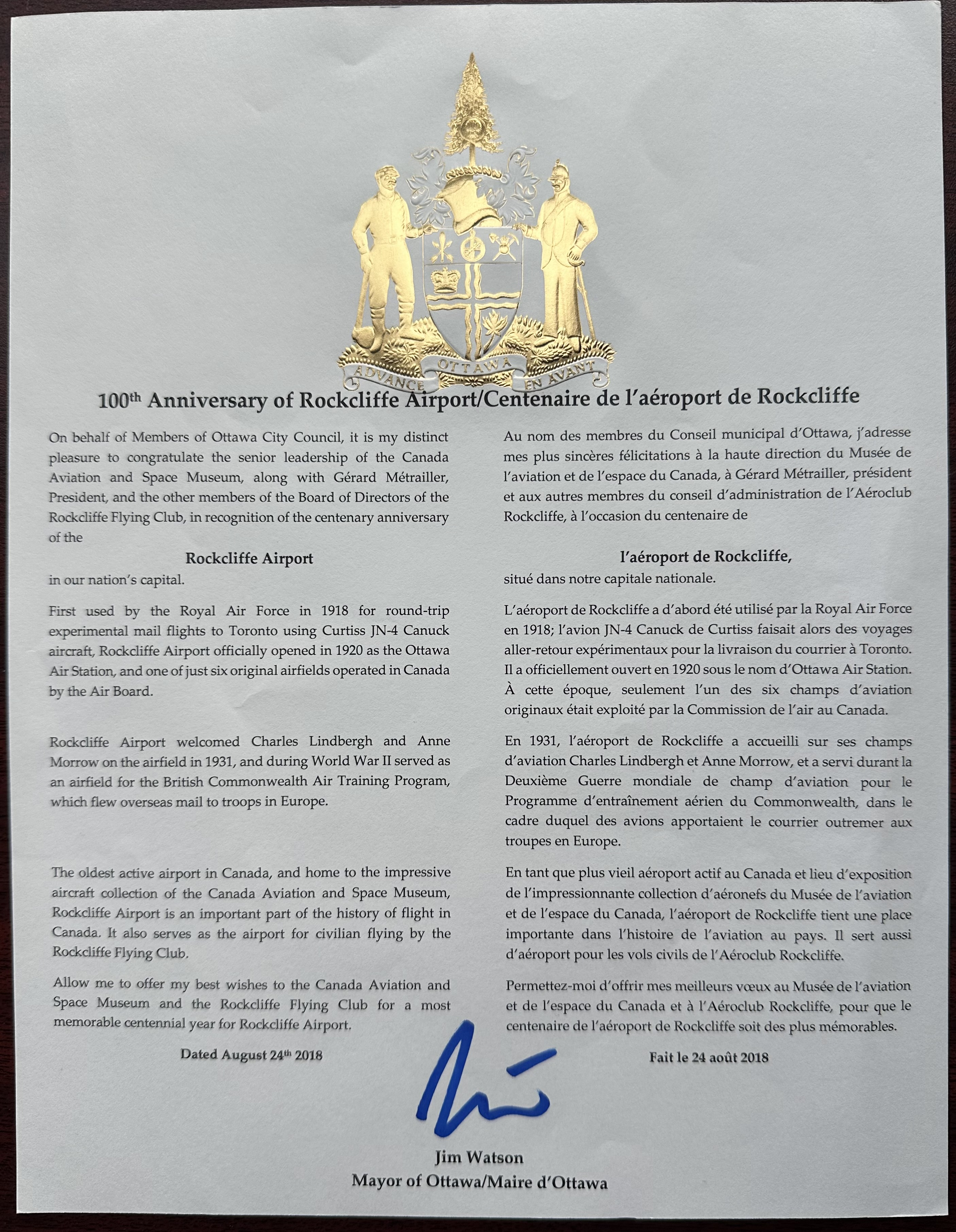
100th anniversary of Rockcliffe Airport, letter from Ottawa Mayor

== History ==
The airport land was originally a military rifle range. In 1918, the Royal Air Force began using the field behind the range for experimental mail flights, and the airport opened officially in 1920 as the Ottawa Air Station, one of the six original airfields opened across Canada by the new Air Board. Since it is on the shore of the Ottawa River and the runways were connected to the riverfront by a road, it was one of very few airports capable of handling and transferring floatplanes on both land and water. On March 12, 1930, Canadian World War I flying ace William George Barker crashed into the Ottawa River and died during an aerial demonstration over the field. In July 1931, Charles Lindbergh and Anne Morrow Lindbergh visited the airport during their northern surveying tour. During World War II. Rockcliffe participated in the British Commonwealth Air Training Plan and many other kinds of testing, training, and transport operations, including flying overseas mail to troops in Europe.

The military importance of the airport declined after World War II, since the runways were too short for typical jet operations. The armed forces shifted most operations to RCAF Station Uplands (now Ottawa Macdonald–Cartier International Airport) in 1957, and ceased flying operations at Rockcliffe in 1964, retaining the station only as an administrative base, while the Rockcliffe Flying Club began using the field for civilian flying.

During the 1970s, the airport was also used for scheduled short takeoff and landing (STOL) commercial flights to the short-lived Victoria STOLport near downtown Montreal. The objective was to demonstrate Twin Otter STOL aircraft in downtown areas and avoid longer drives to the Ottawa Macdonald–Cartier and Montréal–Trudeau airports. For a variety of reasons STOL operations in downtown settings have not proven successful.

The military left the airport completely in 1994, but their aircraft collection remained to form the nucleus of the Canada Aviation and Space Museum. Only one of the former triangle of runways remains active. Runways 04/22 and 15/33 were closed along with most taxiways now servicing the aviation museum.

== Tenants ==
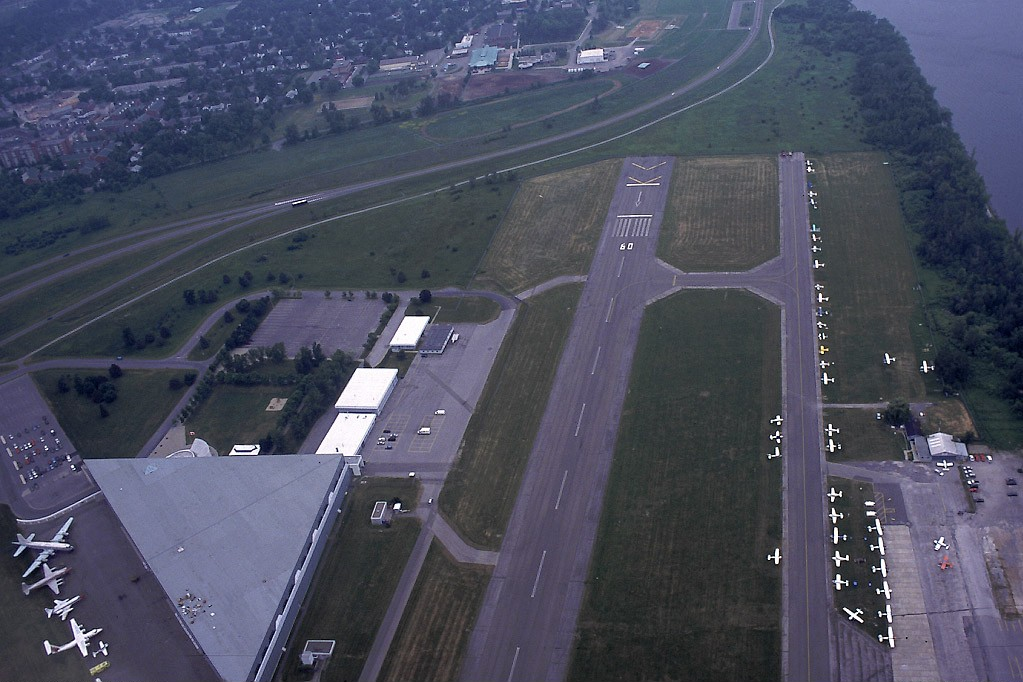
Aerial of the airport

Current tenants of the airport:

- Canadian Aviation and Space Museum - two buildings
- Rockcliffe Flying Club
- Rockcliffe Yacht Club

Former tenants:

- Canadian Armed Forces (Royal Canadian Air Force (RCAF), Canadian Army) - 1920–1964
- Dominion of Canada Rifle Association
- Airtransit - a wholly owned subsidiary of Air Canada used Rockcliffe to demonstrate STOL passenger operations to Victoria STOLport in Montreal from 1974 to 1976

== Transportation to airport ==
By car, the airport can be reached by Sir George-Étienne Cartier Parkway.

By transit, OC Transpo Route 25 occasionally provides direct access to the airport. Route 7 is a short walk from the airport.

== Incidents ==
- March 12, 1930, Canadian World War I flying ace William George Barker, operating a Fairchild KR-21, crashed into the Ottawa River and died during an aerial demonstration over the field.
- March 28, 1950 – A United States Air Force (USAF) Douglas C-47B-50DK had an engine fire and crashed shortly after takeoff, resulting in five fatalities (including American ambassador Laurence Steinhardt) and one survivor.
- July 22, 1953 – A RCAF Canadair North Star of 426 Transport Training Squadron caught fire during loading; the aircraft was destroyed with no fatalities.
- September 14, 2023 - A private plane was stolen, crashing shortly after and damaging two planes. The thief was arrested at the site of the crash and an investigation is ongoing.

== See also ==
- List of airports in the Ottawa area
