= Airtransit =

Canadian airline that provided short take-off and landing (STOL)

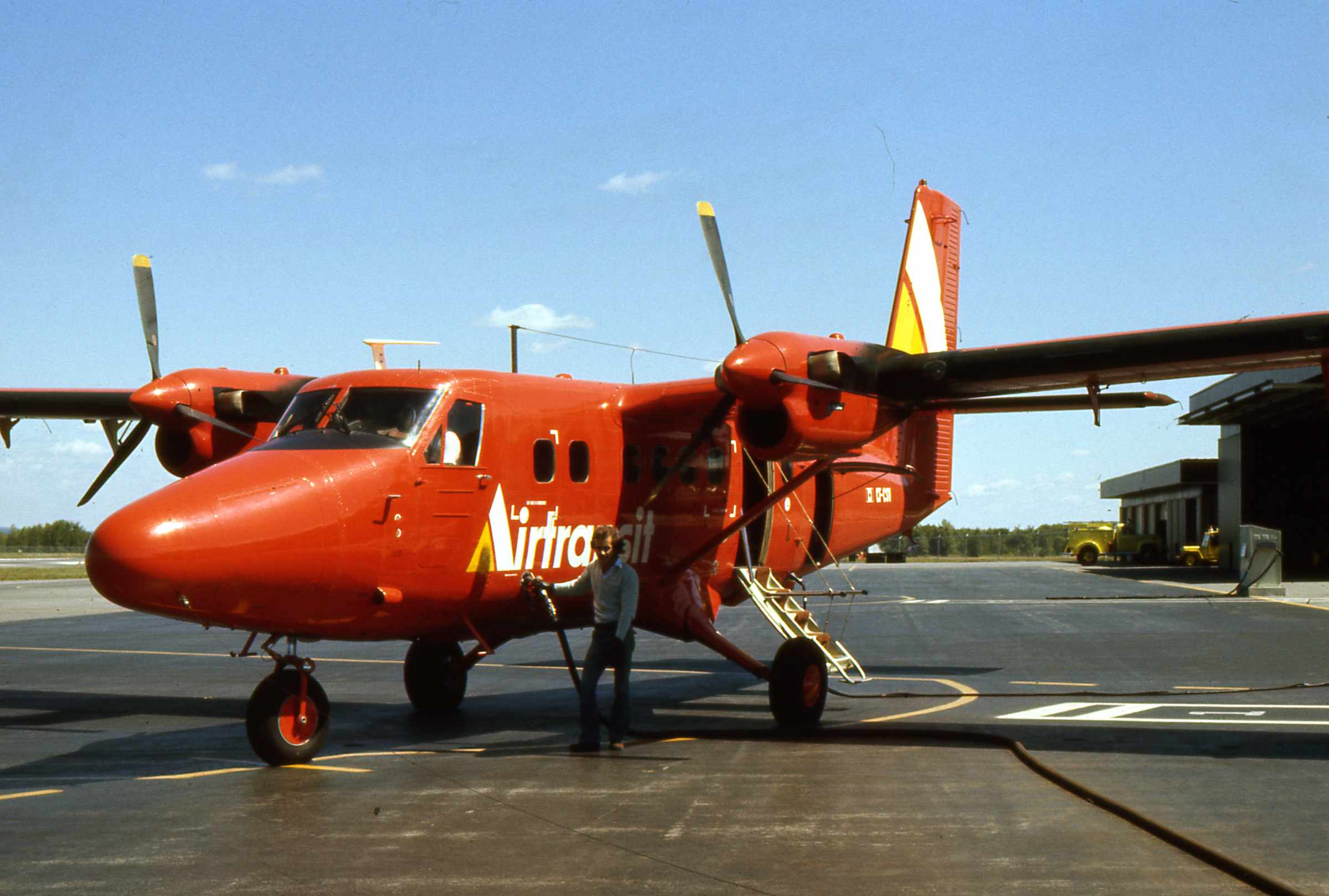
- An Airtransit DHC-6 Twin Otter at Ottawa airport
- Commenced operations: 1973
- Ceased operations: 1975
- Hubs: Victoria STOLport, Ottawa/Rockcliffe Airport
- Fleet size: 6
- Destinations: 2
- Parent company: Air Canada

Airtransit was a Canadian airline that provided short take-off and landing (STOL) service between Ottawa and Montreal. A subsidiary of Air Canada (then a Crown corporation), the airline operated from 1973 to 1976 before closing due to poor business.

== History ==
In 1970, the Science Council of Canada recommended that the government of Canada immediately invest in industrial development of the aviation industry, including construction of aircraft, navigation aids, and regulation of air traffic. The government began these projects shortly after the Science Council's report.

A subsidiary of Air Canada called Airtransit was founded by the government in 1973. Transport Canada developed the airline as a "pilot program" to test the feasibility of a link between the Victoria STOLport in Montreal and Ottawa/Rockcliffe Airport in Ottawa, using an eleven seat De Havilland Canada DHC-6 Twin Otter, and later the De Havilland Canada Dash 7.

The service quickly ran into spending issues. Budget cuts at Air Canada, slow development of the Dash-7, noise concerns from citizens in Ottawa and Montreal, and inadequate infrastructure at Victoria STOLport forced Transport Canada to prematurely cancel the project in 1976.

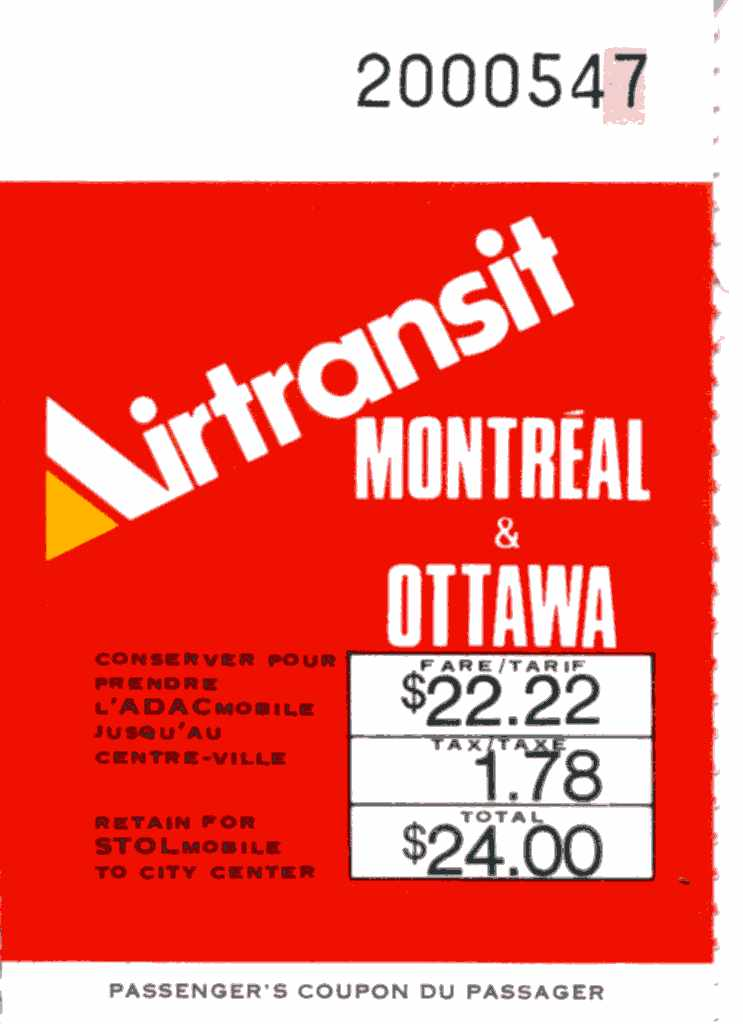
An Airtransit ticket

== Destinations ==
Destinations served by Airtransit
Destination	Period
Montreal (Victoria)	1974-1976
Ottawa (Rockcliffe)	1974-1976

== Fleet ==
Originally used as bush planes, the Twin Otters used by Airtransit were modified specifically for business travellers on short distance trips. The aircraft were equipped with oversized disc brakes and traction control as well as spoilers for the wings, a de-icing system for the propeller blades, emergency brakes, protection against engine fire, and autopilot in case of damage.

The cabin had eleven seats and fifteen windows, as well as one toilet, a cloakroom and air conditioning.

Airtransit fleet
Model	Image	Number	Years operated	Registration Number
DHC-6 Twin Otter		6	1974-1976	CF-CST, CF-CSU, CF-CSV, CF-CSW, CF-CSX, CF-CSY

== See also ==
- List of defunct airlines of Canada
