= Rouyn-Noranda Airport =

Airport in Rouyn-Noranda, Quebec, Canada

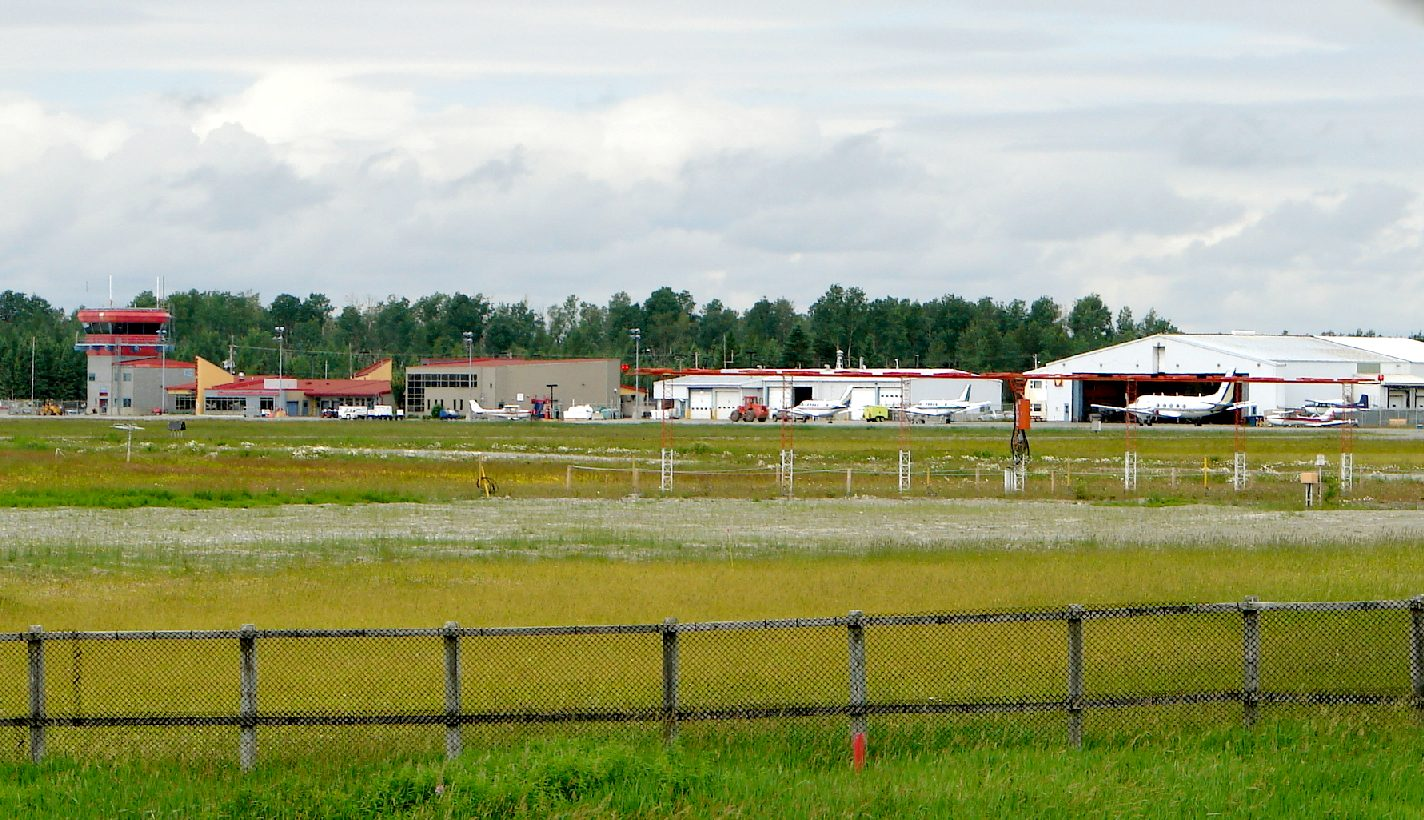
- IATA: YUY; ICAO: CYUY; WMO: 71734

Summary
- Airport type: Public
- Operator: City of Rouyn-Noranda
- Location: Rouyn-Noranda, Quebec
- Time zone: EST (UTC−05:00)
  - Summer (DST): EDT (UTC−04:00)
- Elevation AMSL: 988 ft (301 m)
- Coordinates: 48°12′22″N 78°50′08″W
- Website: https://www.ville.rouyn-noranda.qc.ca/fr/page/aeroport-regional-de-rouyn-noranda/

Map
- Location within Quebec

Runways
Direction	Length		Surface
Direction	ft	m	Surface
08/26	7,500	2,286	Asphalt

Statistics (2012)
- Aircraft movements: 16,474
- Sources: Canada Flight Supplement; Environment Canada; Movements from Statistics Canada

Rouyn-Noranda Airport (IATA: YUY, ICAO: CYUY) is located 7.5 nautical miles (13.9 km; 8.6 mi) east southeast of Rouyn-Noranda, Quebec, Canada.

The airport houses the headquarters of Propair.

== Airlines and destinations ==
Airlines	Destinations
Air Canada Express	Montréal–Trudeau
Air Liaison	Québec City, Val-d'Or
Glencore	Charter: Kattiniq/Donaldson, Montreal–Trudeau
Propair	Gatineau, Montréal–Trudeau, Québec City, Toronto–Billy Bishop, North Bay
