= Propair =

Charter airline at Rouyn-Noranda, Quebec, Canada

Propair Inc.

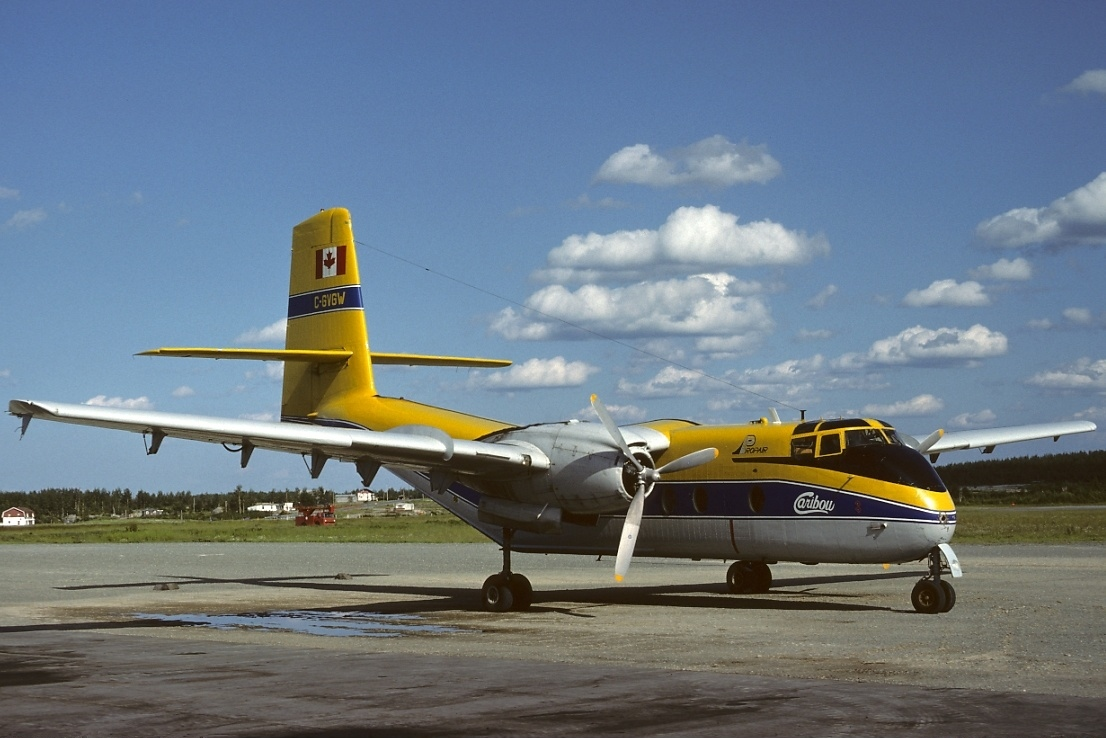
- A formerly owned de Havilland Canada DHC-4 Caribou
IATA	ICAO	Call sign
PP	PRO	PROPAIR
- Founded: 1954
- AOC #: Canada: 253; United States: P27F727F
- Fleet size: 15
- Headquarters: Rouyn-Noranda, Quebec, Canada
- Website: www.propair.ca

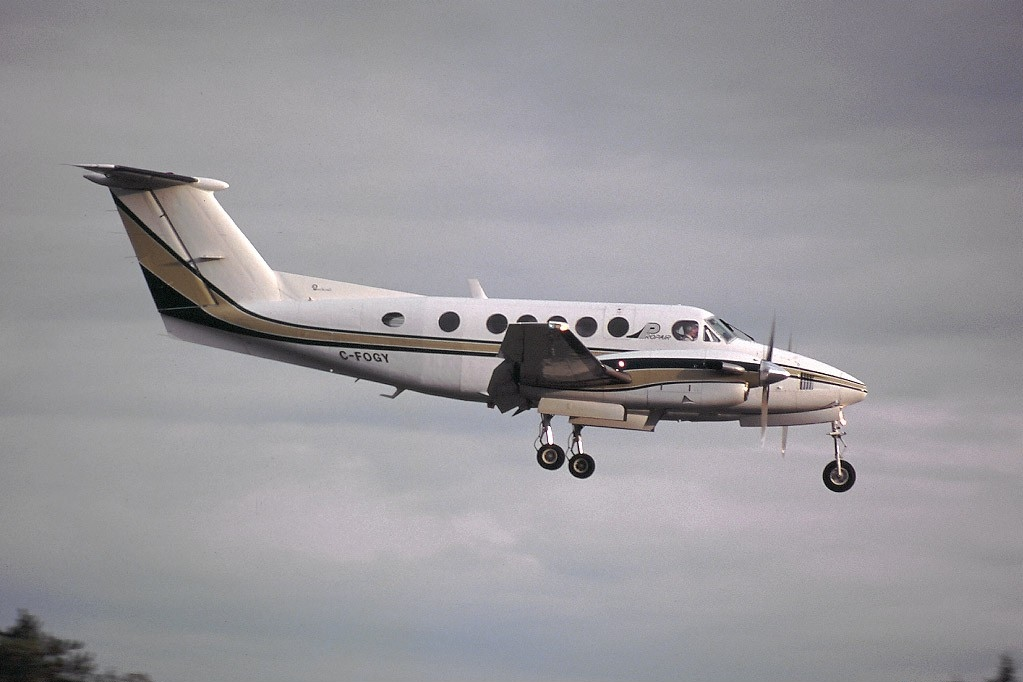
Former Propair Beech 200 Super King Air

Propair Inc. is a charter airline with its headquarters and main base at the Rouyn-Noranda Airport in Rouyn-Noranda, Quebec, Canada. It operates charter and medevac flights and had a secondary base at Montréal–Trudeau International Airport, but it closed in July 2018.

== History ==
In 1954, Émilien Pronovost purchased a bush aviation company, La Sarre Air Services, which was headquartered in Nord-du-Québec and operated in a territory that enjoyed a wealth of natural resources but few if any roads. A pioneer of regional air transport, Pronovost grew his company by carrying workers, scientists and various prospectors attracted to the region. Over time, he was able to strengthen the company's position due to an influx of passengers destined for hunting and fishing camps. Successively supported by his daughters Lise and Claude, then his sons Jean and Louis, Pronovost played a key role in the development of Quebec's largest construction site at the time, the James Bay Project, a series of hydroelectric power stations on the La Grande River. After another ten years of growth, Jean and Louis purchased the company in 1981.

They also bought the company Air Fecteau in 1983, and amalgamated the two businesses to create Propair. With a fleet of around 40 aircraft, Propair was the largest bush aviation company in Eastern Canada, serving nearly the entire Quebec region. Once the region's major projects were completed, and with the signing of the James Bay and Northern Quebec Agreement and its impact on hunting and fishing trips, Propair found itself with a larger fleet than needed to meet the demands of its traditional market. In addition, new roads had been built over time, greatly facilitating ground access to the territory. In order to adjust to this new reality, Propair disposed of its bush aviation assets and acquired aircraft designed for business air charters and air taxi, namely turboprop aircraft with pressurized cabins, better adapted to the fast-growing market it had chosen to target.

=== Flight 420 ===
On 18 June 1998, a company Fairchild-Swearingen Metro II was involved in a crash that killed all eleven people on board. Propair Flight 420 departed Montréal–Dorval International Airport, Quebec, at about 0701 Eastern Daylight Time en route to the Peterborough Airport, Ontario with nine passengers and two pilots. At 12 minutes after take-off, at 3,800 m (12,500 ft) above sea level, the crew radioed air traffic control (ATC) indicating a hydraulic problem and requested a return to Dorval. At about 0719, while descending through 2,600 m (8,600 ft) ASL, the crew told ATC that the left engine was on fire and had been shut down. At about 0720 hours, the crew decided to proceed to Montréal–Mirabel International Airport instead and at 0723, the crew informed ATC that the fire was out. While on final for runway 24 at Mirabel, the crew advised ATC that the left engine was once again on fire. On short final the left wing failed and all on board were killed when the aircraft impacted the ground.

== Services ==
Propair mainly operates air taxi and medevac flights in most part of Quebec, Ontario and the northeastern United States. Propair also offers support services (fuel, maintenance and cargo handling) at Rouyn-Noranda Airport

== Fleet ==
As of 4 October 2026 Transport Canada lists the following 14 aircraft types:

Propair fleet
Aircraft	No. of aircraft	Variants	Notes
Beechcraft King Air	7	A100	9 passengers, cargo, medevac
Beechcraft 1900	8	1900D	18 passengers, cargo
Total	14		

Propair was the last Canadian operator of the Grumman Gulfstream I, but retired their aircraft in 2017. However, Transport Canada still lists the plane with a valid certificate.
