= Ottawa Macdonald–Cartier International Airport =

Airport serving Ottawa, Ontario and Gatineau, Quebec, Canada

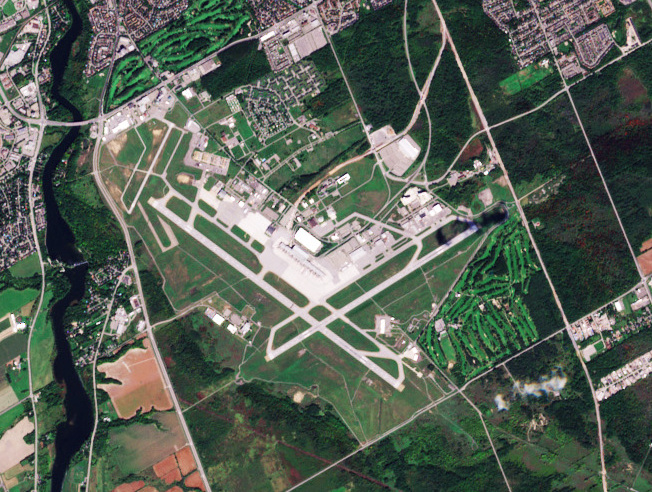
- Aerial view of the airport in 2022
- IATA: YOW; ICAO: CYOW; WMO: 71628

Summary
- Airport type: Public
- Owner: Transport Canada
- Operator: Ottawa Macdonald–Cartier International Airport Authority
- Serves: Ottawa–Gatineau
- Opened: August 20, 1938; 88 years ago
- Hub for: Porter Airlines
- Focus city for: Air Canada; Air Transat
- Time zone: EST (UTC−05:00)
  - Summer (DST): EDT (UTC−04:00)
- Elevation AMSL: 377 ft (115 m)
- Coordinates: 45°19′21″N 075°40′02″W
- Public transit access: Airport station
- Website: www.yow.ca

Map
- Location of airport in Ottawa Location of airport in Ontario Location of airport in Canada

Runways
Direction	Length		Surface
Direction	ft	m	Surface
14/32	10,005	3,050	Grooved asphalt
07/25	8,000	2,438	Grooved asphalt
04/22	3,300	1,006	Asphalt

Statistics (2025)
- Passengers: 4,866,236
- Aircraft movements (2021): 64,797
- Sources: Canada Flight Supplement; Environment Canada; Movements from Statistics Canada; Passenger statistics from Ottawa Airport

Ottawa/Macdonald–Cartier International Airport (IATA: YOW, ICAO: CYOW) or simply Ottawa International Airport is the main international airport serving the National Capital Region of Canada which includes Ottawa, Ontario and Gatineau, Quebec. Located 8 nautical miles (15 km; 9.2 mi) south of downtown Ottawa in the south end of the city, it is Canada's sixth-busiest airport, Ontario's second-busiest airport by airline passenger traffic, with 4,866,236 passengers in 2025. The airport is a major hub for Porter Airlines, a focus city for Air Canada and Air Transat and a home base for Canadian North (formerly First Air). The airport is named after the Canadian statesmen and two of the "founding fathers of Canada", Sir John A. Macdonald and Sir George-Étienne Cartier.

It is classified as an airport of entry by Nav Canada, and is staffed by the Canada Border Services Agency, it is one of nine Canadian airports that contain U.S border preclearance facilities. The airport was formerly a military base known as CFB Ottawa South/CFB Uplands, and is still home to the Royal Canadian Air Force's (RCAF) 412 Transport Squadron, which provides air transport for Canadian and foreign government officials.

== History ==
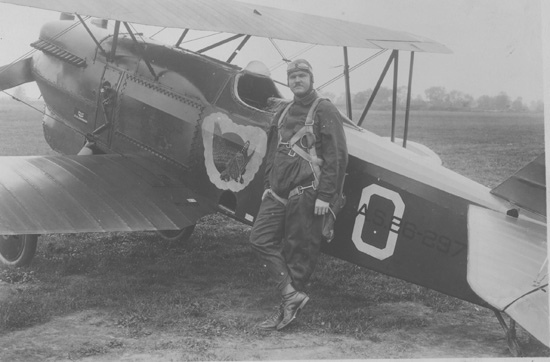
Lt. J. Thad Johnson

On July 2, 1927, twelve P-1 aeroplanes under the command of Major Thomas G. Lanphier, Air Corps, proceeded from Selfridge Field to Ottawa, acting as Special Escort for Colonel Charles Lindbergh, who was to attend at the opening of the Dominion Jubilee. First Lieutenant J. Thad Johnson, Air Corps, commanding 27th Pursuit Squadron, was killed in an unsuccessful parachute jump after a collision with another plane of formation in a demonstration on arrival over Ottawa. There is now a street leading to the airport industrial section named after the aviator.

The airport was opened at Uplands on a high plateau (then) south of Ottawa by the Ottawa Flying Club, which still operates from the field. During World War II, when it was known as Uplands, the airport hosted No. 2 Service Flying Training School for the British Commonwealth Air Training Plan, providing advanced pilot training in Harvard and Yale aircraft.

In 1950, to allow for a southward expansion of the airport, the nearby farming community of Bowesville, settled in 1821, was expropriated. The last residents left and the village school was torn down in 1951. The current main airport terminal now stands on the site of the crossroads at the centre of the village. The road to the south of the airport still bears the name "Bowesville Road".

During the 1950s, while the airport was still named Uplands and a joint-use civilian and military field, it was the busiest airport in Canada by takeoffs and landings, reaching a peak of 307,079 aircraft movements in 1959, nearly double its current traffic. At the time, the airport had scheduled airline flights by Air Canada (or Trans Canada Air Lines) (Toronto, Montreal, and Val-d'Or), Trans Air (Churchill), and Eastern Air Lines (New York via Syracuse and Washington via Montreal). With the arrival of civilian jet travel, the Canadian government built a new field south of the original one, with two much longer runways and a new terminal building designed to handle up to 900,000 passengers/year.

The terminal building had been scheduled to open in December 1959, but during the opening ceremonies, a United States Air Force F-104 Starfighter went supersonic during a low pass over the airport, and the resultant sonic boom shattered most of the glass in the airport (including the entire north wall) and damaged ceiling tiles, doorframes and window frames, and even structural beams. The total cost of the damage exceeded $500,000, and the opening was delayed until April 1960. George Hees, the Canadian Transport Minister, stated that "the sonic explosion subjected the terminal building to five times the hurricane force which it had been designed to withstand". The incident has been described as "the most expensive five seconds in Canadian civil aviation history". The original terminal building and Trans-Canada Airways/DOT hangar continued in private use on the airport's north field as a location for the Ottawa Flying Club until the fall of 2011 when it was demolished.

The airport was renamed "Ottawa International Airport" in 1964. It became "Ottawa Macdonald–Cartier International Airport" in 1993.

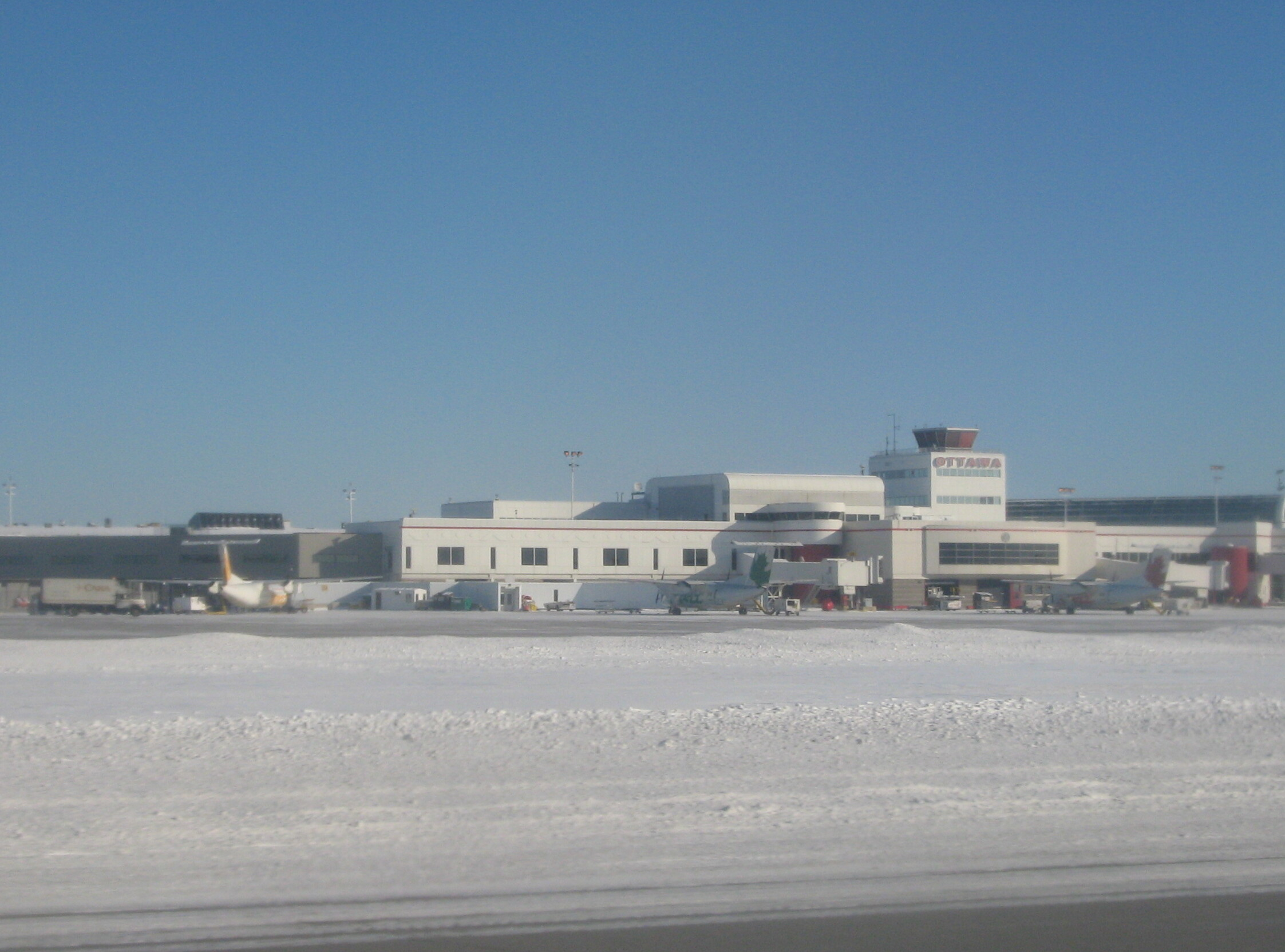
The remaining component of the mid-century terminal in 2008

In the 2000s, the original terminal was entirely replaced and expanded by more modern facilities.

In 2017, the Canada Border Services Agency started to use facial recognition technology to process incoming international travellers. All international passengers are directed to Primary Inspection Kiosks before seeing a Border Services Officer and are no longer required to fill out a declaration card.

On November 1, 2022, Porter Airlines and the Ottawa International Airport Authority announced they would be investing over $65 million at the airport in the future. Porter also announced they would be building two aircraft hangars at a size of over 14,000 m^{2} (150,000 sq ft) each, to maintain the Dash 8 and The CRJ-200 aircraft. These will be built in two phases, with phase one being completed by the end of 2023 and phase two in the first quarter of 2024, making the airport the primary CRJ-200 maintenance base and creating 200 local jobs.

== Facility layout ==
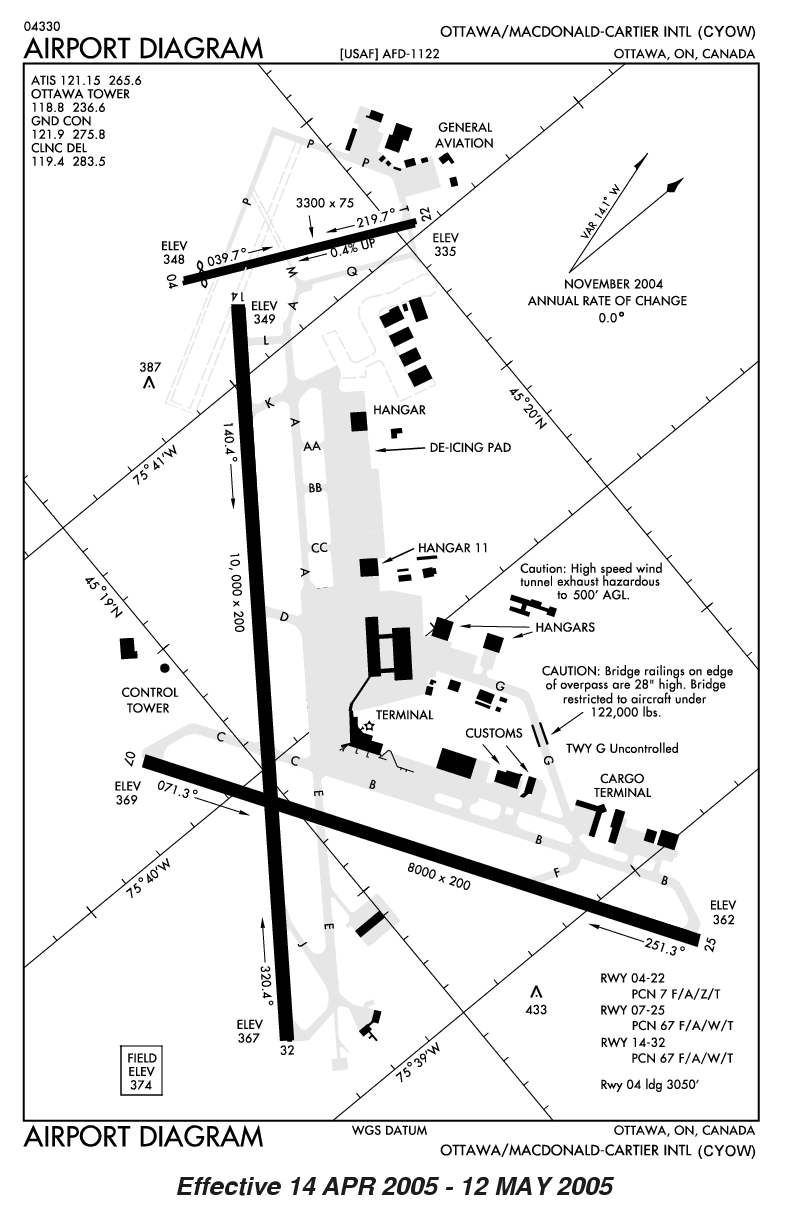
Diagram of the Ottawa airport (prior to 2005)

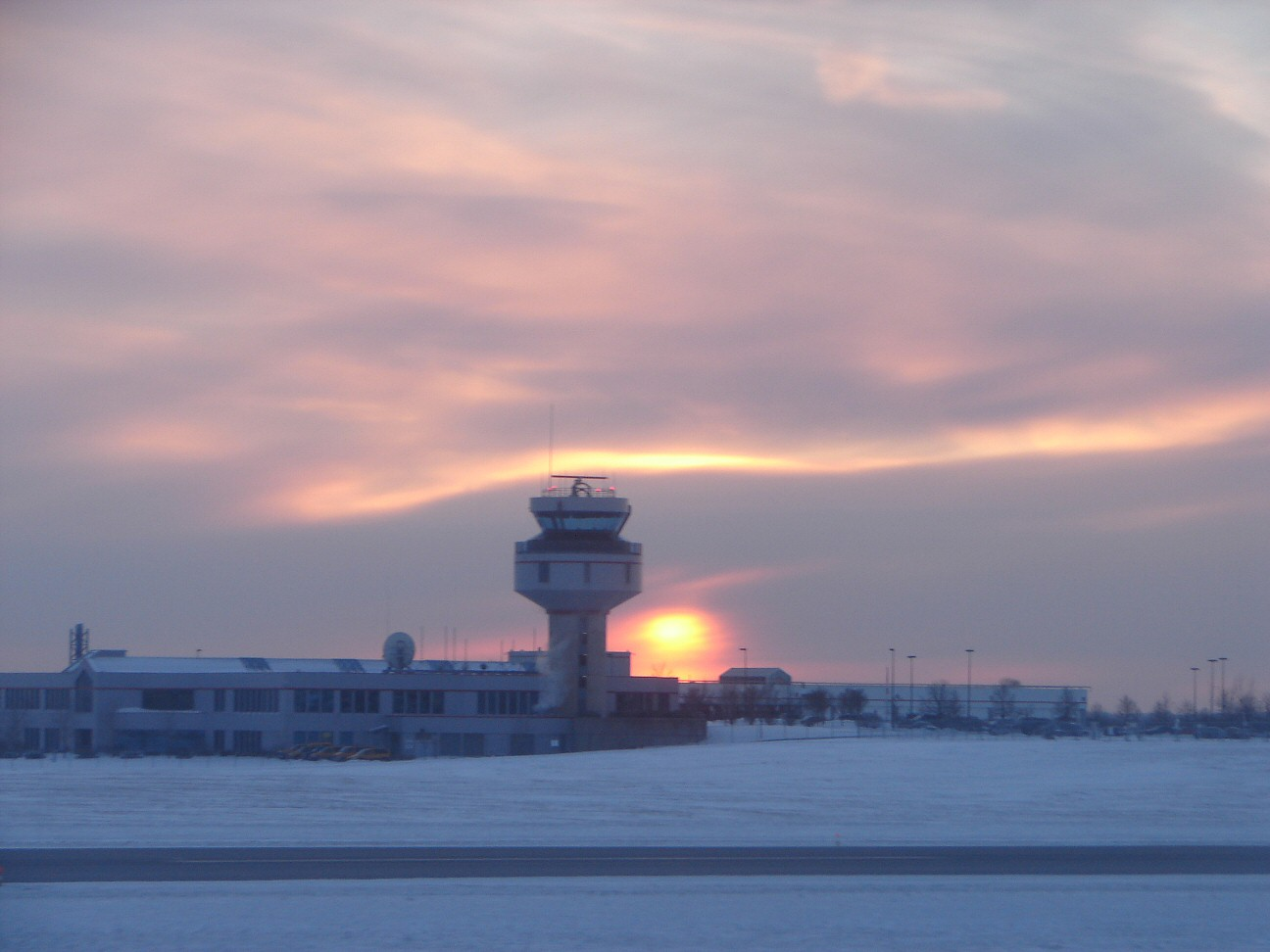
Control tower

The airport consists of two distinct airfields connected by a taxiway. The smaller north field, originally referred to as Uplands, was founded by the Ottawa Flying Club in the late 1920s and then used by Trans-Canada Air Lines, the predecessor of Air Canada. This was the area primarily used by No. 2 Service Flying Training School. Several hangars were constructed during World War II, but were all demolished by the early 2000s.

The north field is still popular for general aviation, although only one of its runways, 04/22, is still in use. There are a number of aircraft component repair facilities located within the same grouping of buildings as the Ottawa Flying Club.

The south field consists of the two longer runways, 07/25 and 14/32, designed for jet airliners. The public passenger terminal is tucked into the north side of the intersection of the two runways, while the two general aviation FBOs for the south field are nearer to the threshold of runway 25. Customs services for private aircraft are available at the two fixed-base operators (FBO), Shell Aerocentre and Skyservice Business Aviation, on the south field. There are also a number of aviation component repair facilities on the airport grounds, mostly around the Skyservice complex. The Government of Canada operates a number of hangars, including the Canada Reception Centre, which is used to greet visiting dignitaries. The National Research Council operates two facilities on the north side of the grounds, including two wind tunnels. One of these has supersonic capabilities, and the other has a {{|cvt9|m}} diameter, making it the largest in Canada. Transport Canada operates two facilities on airport grounds, one of which houses training equipment, including flight simulators, and the other is a hangar for maintenance and storage of government-owned aircraft.

YOW covers an expanse of 1,686 ha (4,170 acres) of total airport property.

== Terminal ==
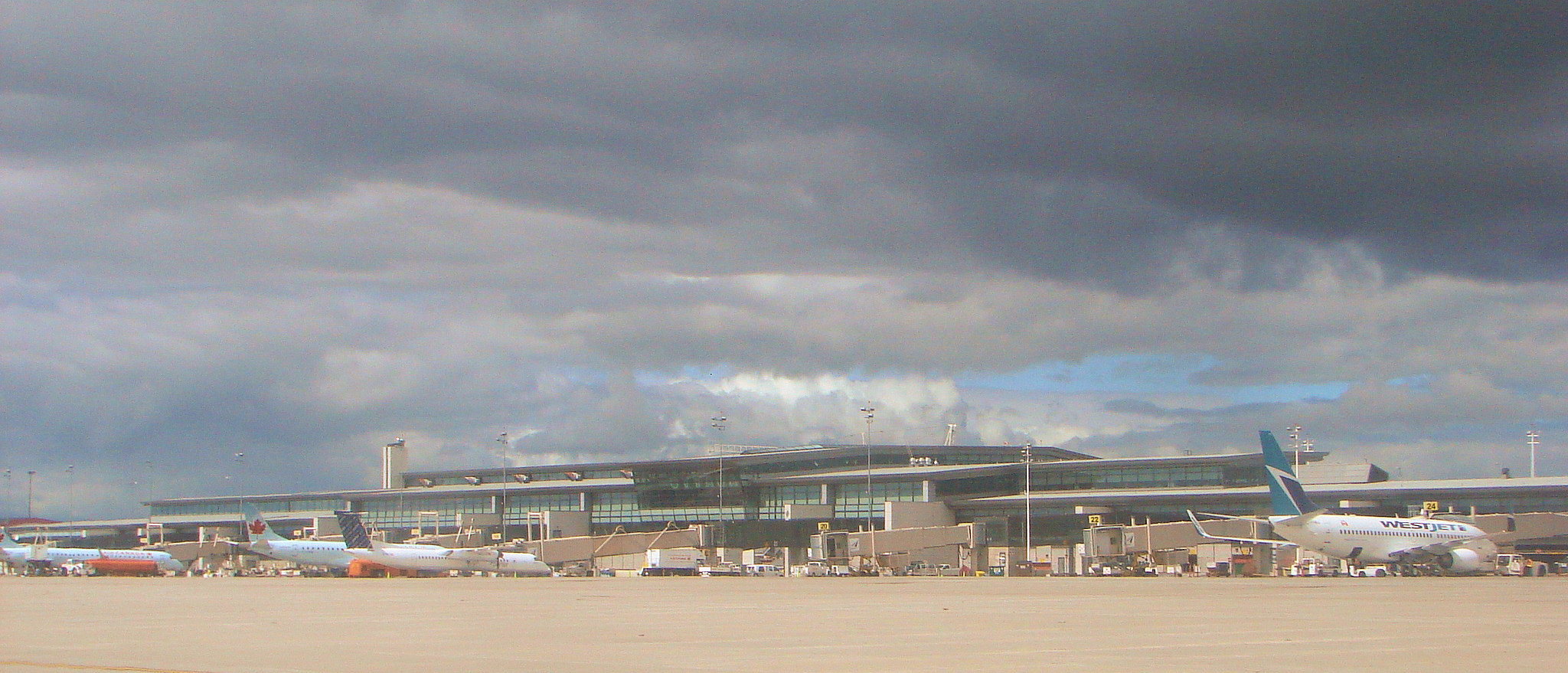
The modern terminal in 2010

At the turn of the millennium, the Ottawa Airport Authority announced plans to build a second, adjacent terminal to meet the demands of increased traffic. The terminal, designed by architect Richard Brisbin, was completed ahead of schedule and opened in October 2003. This terminal building now handles all airline passenger traffic. A section of the 1960 terminal, which was connected to the new terminal by an enclosed bridge, was still used at peak times of the day when extra gate space was needed, and it also handled most domestic regional flights. Funding for the terminal construction was collected from the parking meters outside the terminal beginning in January 1997, when rates were hiked to cover the costs of a new terminal building.

The old terminal and tower, built in 1960, was a modernist International style designed by architects James Strutt, William Gilleland and by Transport Canada architect W.A. Ramsay. They had been heavily renovated and modernized in 1985–87, which included the removal of a seating area containing personal television screens which would provide 15 minutes of VHF TV channels for 25 cents, as well as an open ceiling design. They were demolished in 2008 to make way for Phase II of the new terminal.

The airport's board of directors approved a further expansion of the airport's passenger terminal on April 4, 2006. The extension of the new terminal was built in phases by Brisbin Brook Benyon and Architectura. Phase II, the next phase of the expansion program opened March 13, 2008. This addition contains over 7,000 m^{2} (75,000 sq ft) of space and adds an additional twelve gates and seven jetways.

=== Interior design ===
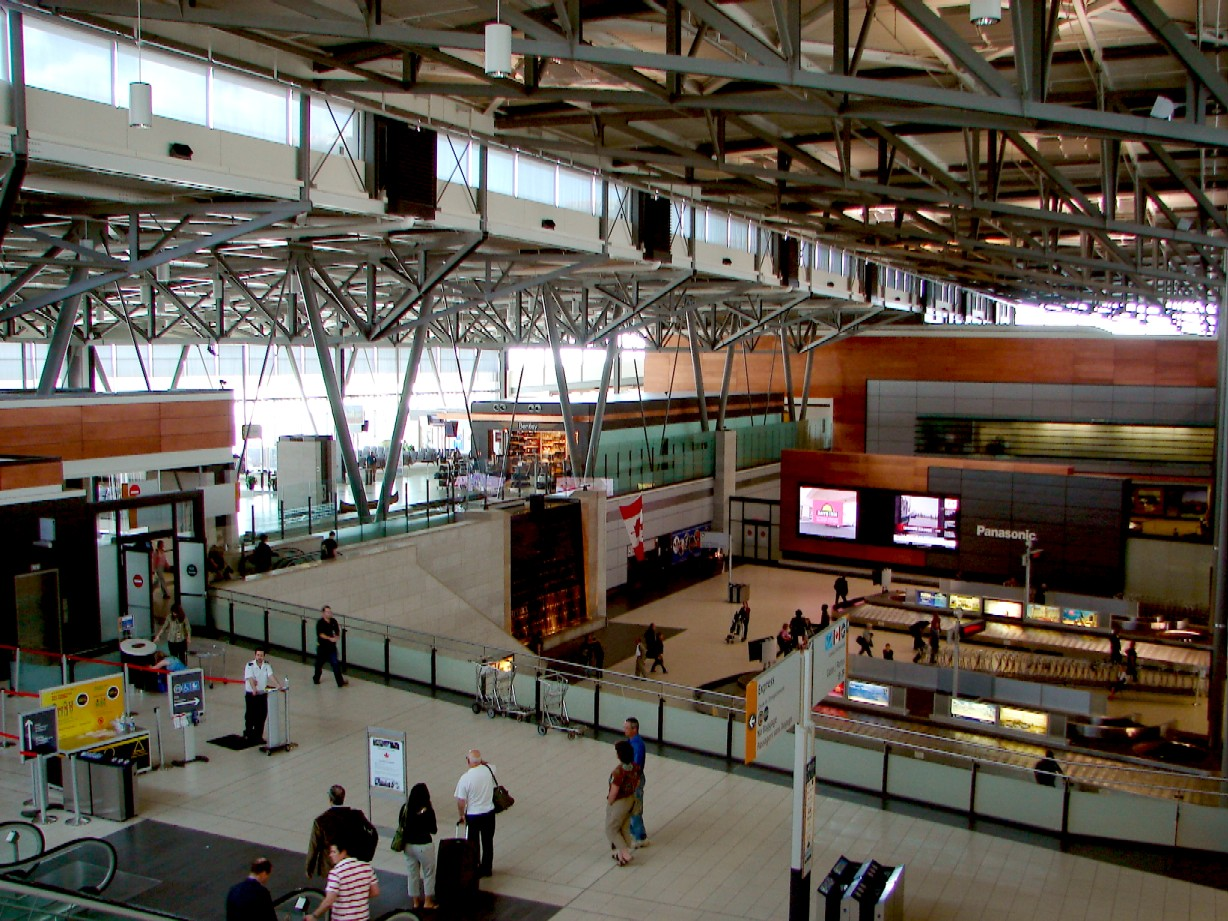
Terminal interior

The terminal's design focuses on creating a calm and easy travel experience for passengers but also honours aspects of the region through the display of various art by commissioned Canadian artists. A soothing water feature representing the meeting of the region's three rivers runs throughout the terminal. Copper and limestone finishes are visible throughout, representative of the capital's Parliament Buildings. Other Canadian features include an inuksuk, commissioned and sponsored by First Air, and a rare traditional birch bark canoe built by the master craftsman and Algonquin leader who created an identical one for the late Prime Minister Pierre Elliott Trudeau. The airport features a large-scale carved glass sculpture by Canadian glass artist, Warren Carther.

== Airlines and destinations ==
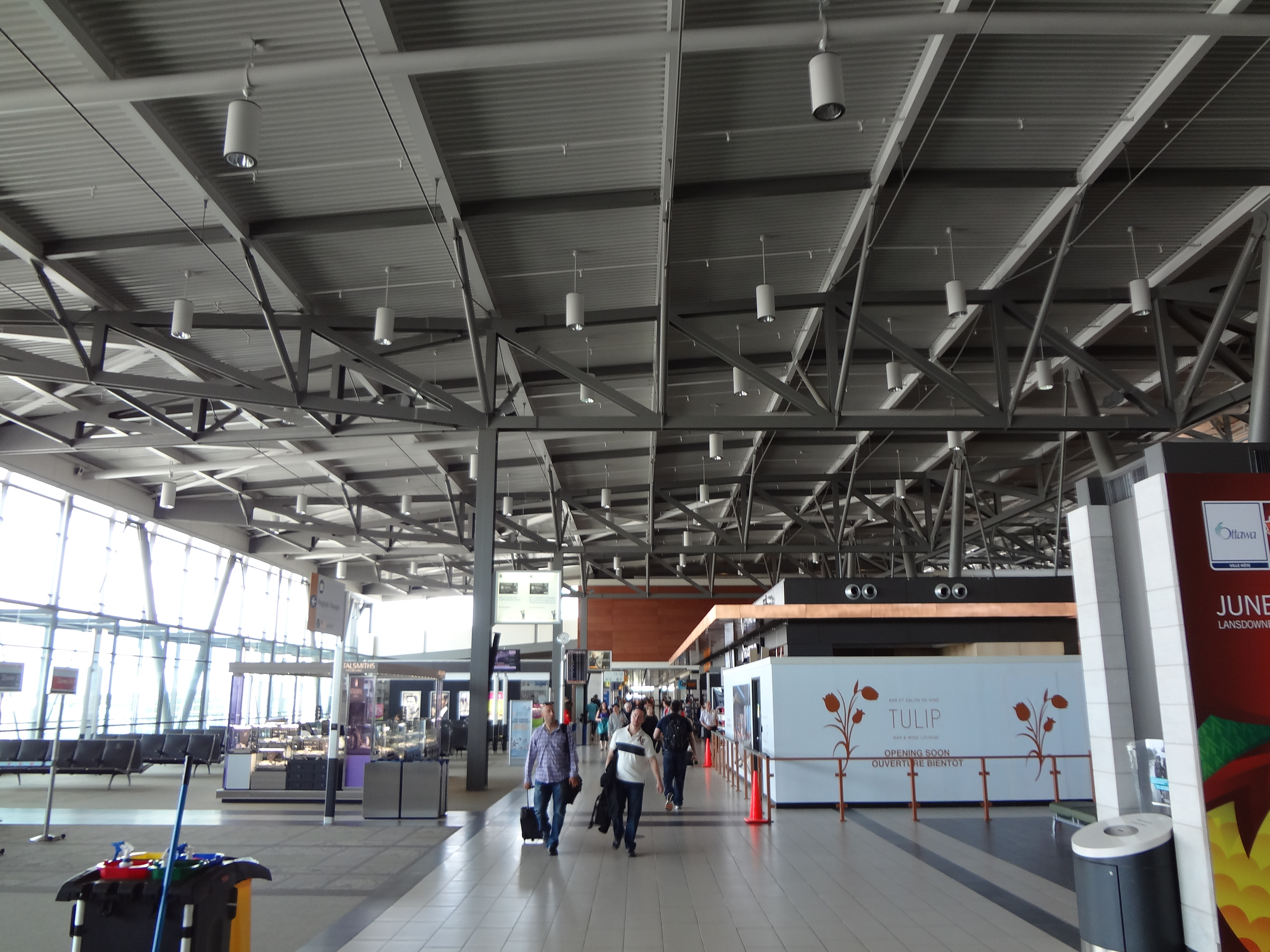
Domestic concourse

Macdonald–Cartier Airport is part of Canada's busiest air corridor between Ottawa, Montreal, and Toronto, which is commonly referred to as the Eastern Triangle. The airport is also a gateway for flights to the eastern Arctic via Iqaluit.

=== International destinations ===
==== North America ====
Ottawa's airport serves many major North American airlines and several destinations in the United States, Mexico and the Caribbean.

Once suspended from March 2020 until October 2021 due to the COVID-19 pandemic, it began reopening cross-border destinations within the continent, beginning with service to Fort Lauderdale and Washington–Dulles, with other destinations in the United States and Caribbean countries soon after.

Porter Airlines has launched multiple routes to the United States since 2023 as it has developed the airport into a major hub.

==== Europe ====
The airport currently offers direct flights to three European airports: Paris–Charles de Gaulle, London–Heathrow and London-Gatwick. It previously had a connection to Frankfurt.

In September 2019, Canadian flag carrier Air Canada announced that it would shut down its seasonal daily route between Ottawa and Frankfurt in Germany, a key Star Alliance hub. However, Lufthansa announced a plan to begin flights from Frankfurt to Ottawa Airport five times a week from May 2020. This plan did not materialize though, when the airport lost all nonstop transatlantic routes to Europe due to the pandemic in March 2020.

On June 27, 2023, Air France began a new, year-round route connecting Ottawa with its main hub, at Paris–Charles de Gaulle, with service offered five times weekly. First by Airbus A330-200, then with Boeing 787-9 Dreamliner, then with a Airbus A350-900XWB, flights have been operated with a 328-seat Boeing 777-200 aircraft since October 30, 2024. Since June 19, 2024, the service is offered daily during the summer months.

On October 8, 2025, Air Transat announced a new summer seasonal route to London Gatwick, operating three weekly flights. This is the second non-stop service to London, alongside Air Canada's route to London Heathrow which operates year round.

=== Passenger ===
Airlines	Destinations
Air Canada	Calgary, London–Heathrow, Montréal–Trudeau, Toronto–Pearson, Vancouver; Seasonal: Cancún, Fort Lauderdale, Montego Bay (resumes December 6, 2026), Nassau, Orlando, Punta Cana
Air Canada Express	Fredericton, Halifax, Moncton, Montréal–Trudeau, Québec City, Toronto–Billy Bishop, Washington–National, Winnipeg
Air France	Paris–Charles de Gaulle
Air North	Seasonal: Whitehorse, Yellowknife
Air Transat	Seasonal: Cancún, Montréal–Trudeau, Puerto Plata, Punta Cana
Canadian North	Iqaluit, Kuujjuaq, Rankin Inlet, Yellowknife
Porter Airlines	Boston, Calgary, Cancún, Charlottetown, Edmonton, Fort Lauderdale, Fredericton, Halifax, Hamilton (ON), Kelowna, London (ON) (begins April 12, 2027), Moncton, Newark, Orlando, St. John's (NL), Thunder Bay, Toronto–Billy Bishop, Toronto–Pearson, Vancouver, Victoria, Windsor, Winnipeg; Seasonal: Aruba, Deer Lake, Fort Myers, Grand Cayman, Liberia (CR), Miami, Montego Bay (begins November 25, 2026), Nassau, Providenciales (begins December 17, 2026), Puerto Vallarta, San José del Cabo (begins December 18, 2026), Tampa
Propair	Montréal–Trudeau, Québec City, Sudbury
United Airlines	Seasonal: Chicago–O'Hare
United Express	Chicago–O'Hare, Denver (Begins April 29, 2027), Newark, Washington–Dulles
WestJet	Calgary, Edmonton, Toronto–Pearson, Winnipeg; Seasonal: Cancún, Montego Bay, Puerto Vallarta, Punta Cana

== Statistics ==
=== Annual passenger traffic ===
Annual passenger traffic at Ottawa Airport
Year	Passengers	Change from previous year
1996	2,857,838	
1997	3,046,368	▲6.60%
1998	3,110,548	▲2.11%
1999	3,211,607	▲3.25%
2000	3,434,345	▲6.94%
2001	3,391,295	▼1.25%
2002	3,216,886	▼5.14%
2003	3,262,345	▲1.41%
2004	3,609,885	▲10.65%
2005	3,735,433	▲3.48%
2006	3,807,756	▲1.94%
2007	4,088,528	▲7.37%
2008	4,339,225	▲6.13%
2009	4,232,830	▼2.45%
2010	4,473,894	▲5.70%
2011	4,624,626	▲3.37%
2012	4,685,956	▲1.33%
2013	4,578,591	▼2.29%
2014	4,616,448	▲0.83%
2015	4,656,360	▲0.86%
2016	4,743,091	▲1.86%
2017	4,839,677	▲2.04%
2018	5,110,801	▲5.60%
2019	5,106,487	▼0.08%
2020	1,363,512	▼73.30%
2021	1,170,789	▼14.13%
2022	2,992,334	▲155.58%
2023	4,095,914	▲36.88%
2024	4,606,824	▲12.47%
2025	4,866,236	▲5.63%

=== Top destinations ===
Busiest domestic routes from YOW (as of 5 July 2025)
Rank	Destination	Flights per week	Carriers
1	Toronto–Pearson, Ontario	105	Air Canada, WestJet, Porter
2	Toronto–Billy Bishop, Ontario	71	Porter, Air Canada
3	Montréal, Quebec	49	Air Canada
4	Calgary, Alberta	46	Air Canada, Porter, WestJet
5	Halifax, Nova Scotia	43	Air Canada, Porter
5	Vancouver, British Columbia	43	Air Canada, Porter, WestJet
7	Edmonton, Alberta	26	Porter, WestJet
8	Winnipeg, Manitoba	18	Air Canada, Porter, WestJet
9	Charlottetown, Prince Edward Island	14	Porter
9	Moncton, New Brunswick	14	Porter

Busiest international routes from YOW (2024)
Rank	Airport	Passengers	Carriers
1	Paris–Charles de Gaulle, France	160,657	Air France
2	New York-Newark, New Jersey	144,243	Porter, United
3	Chicago, Illinois	108,307	United
4	Orlando, Florida	103,262	Air Canada, Porter
5	Fort Lauderdale, Florida	90,969	Air Canada, Porter
6	Washington–Dulles, Virginia	83,772	United
7	Cancún, Mexico	41,542	Air Canada, Air Transat
8	Washington–National, D.C.	36,117	Air Canada
9	Fort Myers, Florida	14,910	Porter, WestJet
10	Tampa, Florida	11,046	Air Canada, Porter

== Ground transportation ==
=== Public transit ===
OC Transpo operated route 97 with frequent express bus service to the airport bus stop located on the arrivals level, along a dedicated bus rapid transit (BRT) transitway with connections to O-Train lines 1 and 2, and other transit stations. Two OC Transpo ticket machines are available, one at the southern end of the Arrivals level and one within the O-Train station.

In 2019, construction of Line 4 of the O-Train network started with the line terminating at Airport station (Ottawa), inside the airport terminal on the north side on the departures floor with the Airport Authority volunteering funds for the project. After several delays, the line opened on January 6, 2025 with only weekday service and eventually reached daily service on March 16, 2025. After midnight when line 4 is not in service, route N98 replaces.

On August 24, 2025, a new route numbered 105 was introduced as part of fall service changes. Running from St-Laurent station to the airport 24/7 every 30 minutes, the route was designed to provide east end residents with more connections to the airport. It also provides a direct connection to intercity bus services at St-Laurent station as well as bus and Via Rail services at Ottawa station (adjacent to Tremblay station on O-Train Line 1). The number 105 was inspired by the CF-105 Arrow, which was a supersonic Canadian aircraft built in the late 1950s.

=== Automobile ===
Taxis, airport limos, and shuttle buses are available 24 hours a day, 7 days a week. There are several rental car agencies located at the airport, as well as ride-sharing services such as Uber and Lyft.

=== Bicycle ===
In the more temperate seasons, it is possible to cycle downtown from the airport via the Capital Pathway and a number of quiet residential streets.

== Awards ==
The 2010 Airport Service Quality (ASQ) Award for Best Airport in the World for the 2–5 million passengers category went to Ottawa Airport.

In February 2010, Ottawa Macdonald–Cartier International Airport was recognized by customers for its excellent customer service in the results of Airports Council International's (ACI) Airport Service Quality (ASQ) program. For the fifth consecutive year, Ottawa placed second overall for worldwide airports that serve between 0 and 5 million passengers. In 2008, 118 airports from around the world participated in ASQ.

Along with Air Canada, the airport was the joint winner of the 2010 Ottawa Tourism Award for Tourism Partnership of the Year in recognition of the co-operative work done in promoting Air Canada's non-stop flight between Frankfurt and Ottawa.

Also in 2010, the airport was presented with three Airport Revenue News Best Airport Concessions Awards. In the Small Airport division, Ottawa was named the winner in the following categories: Airport with the Best Concessions Program Design, Airport with the Best Concessions Management Team, and Airport with the Best Overall Concessions Program.

In 2011 it won Best Airport in North America of the Airport Service Quality Awards by Airports Council International, as well as 2nd Best Airport by Size in the 2 to 5 million passenger category.

== Incidents and accidents ==
- On August 5, 1959, a U.S. Air Force Lockheed F-104 Starfighter performed a low-altitude flyby of the airport during celebration of the opening of a new passenger terminal. The sonic boom generated by the jet shattered most of the terminal's windows and caused extensive structural damage, delaying the opening for another year.
- On May 19, 1967, an Air Canada Douglas DC-8 on a training flight from Montreal crashed on approach to the Ottawa airport, killing all three crew members.
- On September 15, 1988, a Bradley Air Services (which later became First Air) BAe 748 crashed on approach to runway 25, killing both crew members.
- On July 1, 1990, a P-51 Mustang crashed on the Hylands Golf Course during the National Capital Airshow, killing the pilot, Harry Tope. He was performing with the aircraft fully fuelled and luggage on board for the trip home after the airshow and was unable to recover from a manoeuvre.
- On June 13, 1997, a North American Airlines Fairchild Swearingen Metroliner struck the runway with gear retracted during a botched approach, resulting in propeller strikes and a fire in one engine when it came to rest on runway 25. The aircraft was written off, but the crew escaped without injury.
- On June 16, 2010, United Express Flight 8050, an Embraer ERJ-145 (N847HK) operated by Trans States Airlines, overran the runway and was substantially damaged when the nose gear collapsed. There were 36 people on board, 33 passengers and three crew, and two of the crew and one passenger were injured.
- On September 4, 2011, United Express Flight 3363, an Embraer ERJ-145 (N840HK) operated by Trans States Airlines, slid off the runway upon landing. All 44 passengers and the three crew aboard were uninjured, although the plane sustained substantial damage.
- On July 31, 2017, Air Transat Flight 157, an Airbus A330-200, en route from Brussels to Montréal-Trudeau was diverted to Ottawa due to a chain of storms passing through the Montreal area. More than 300 passengers were kept on the plane without water, electricity, or air conditioning and rationed food for six hours. A passenger called 911 due to the deteriorating situation with some passengers complaining of suffocation. Airport authorities responded by delivering water and disembarking passengers including those complaining of suffocation injuries. Air Transat blamed congestion at Ottawa's airport for the situation, where airport administration stated that the pilots asked for no help during the six-hour situation. The event enraged Canadian lawmakers pushing to improve Canada's passenger bill of rights.
- On July 31, 2025, a Grumman AA-5A (C-GUXN) took off from Gatineau then crashed on approach to runway 14, after diverting to YOW, following an engine failure, killing the pilot and injuring the two passengers.
