= 2025 Canadian wildfires =

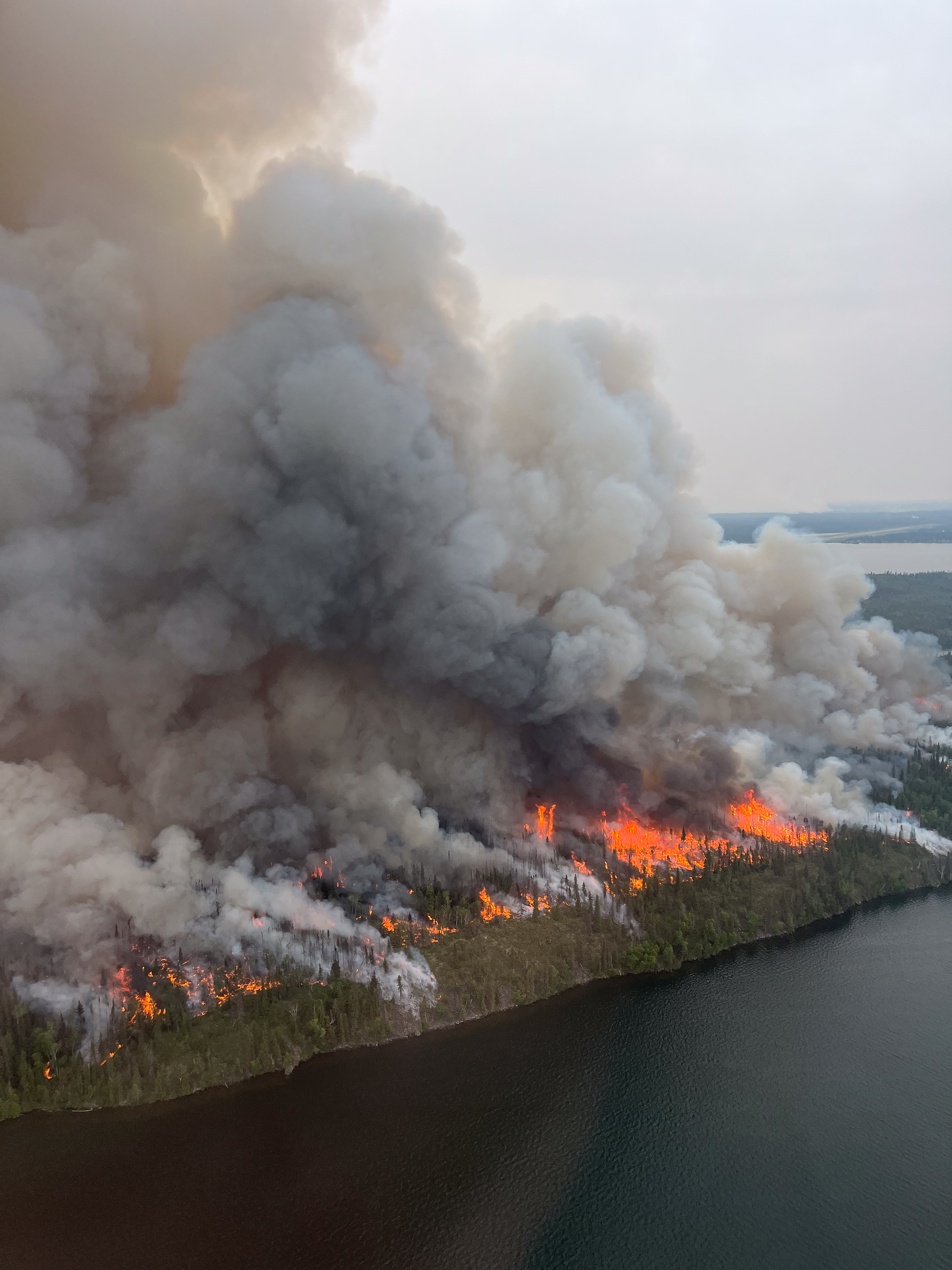
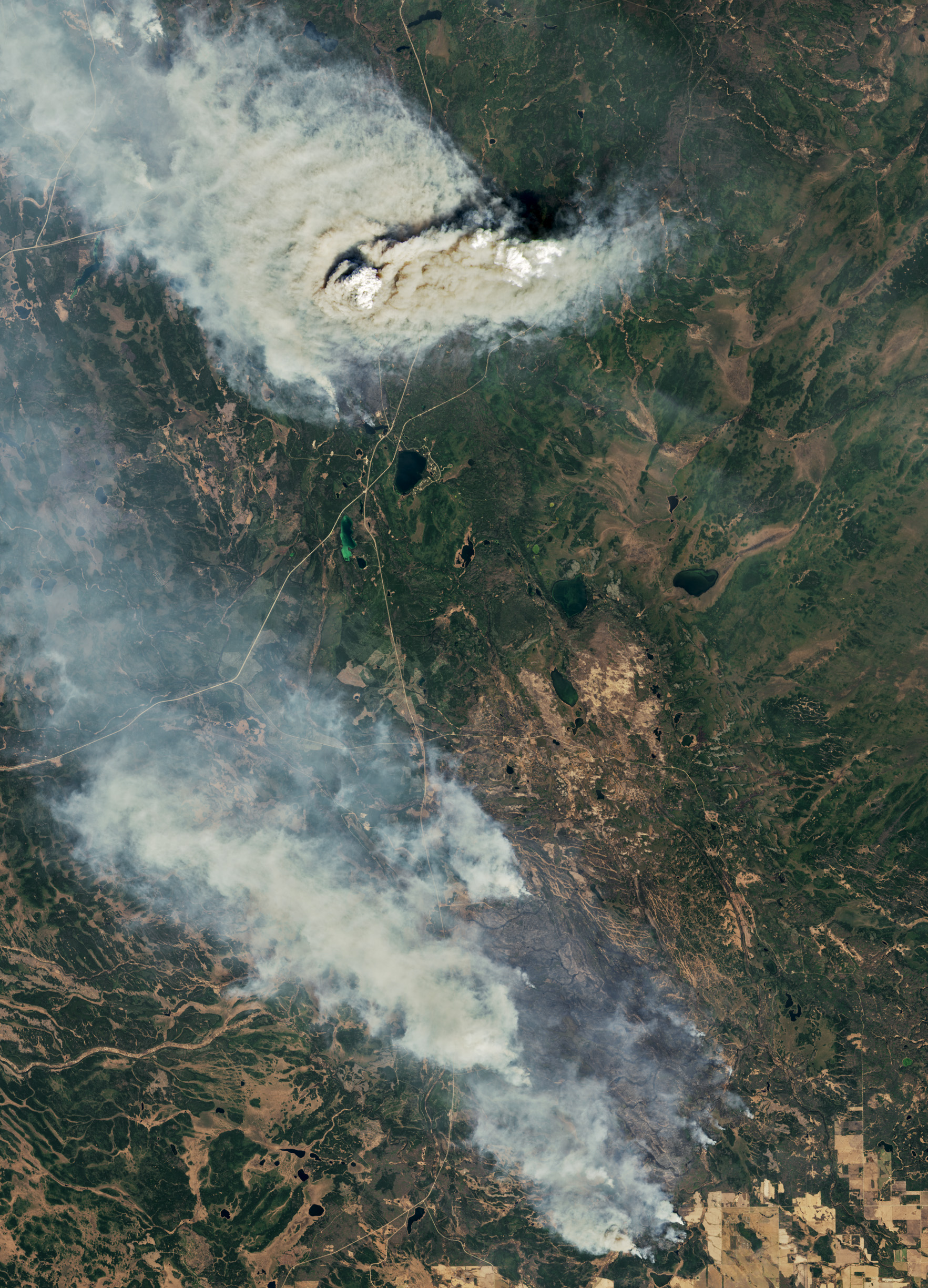
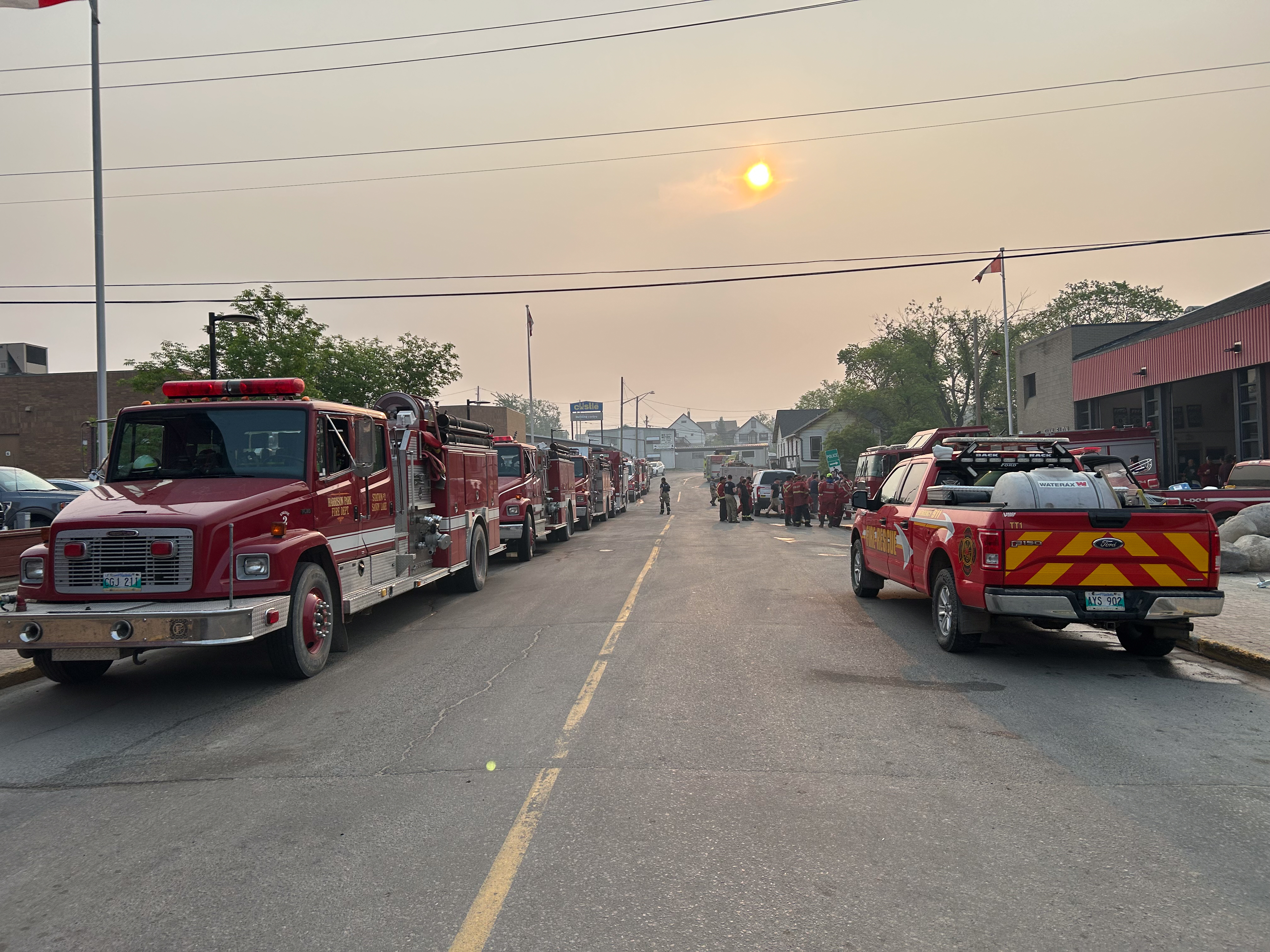
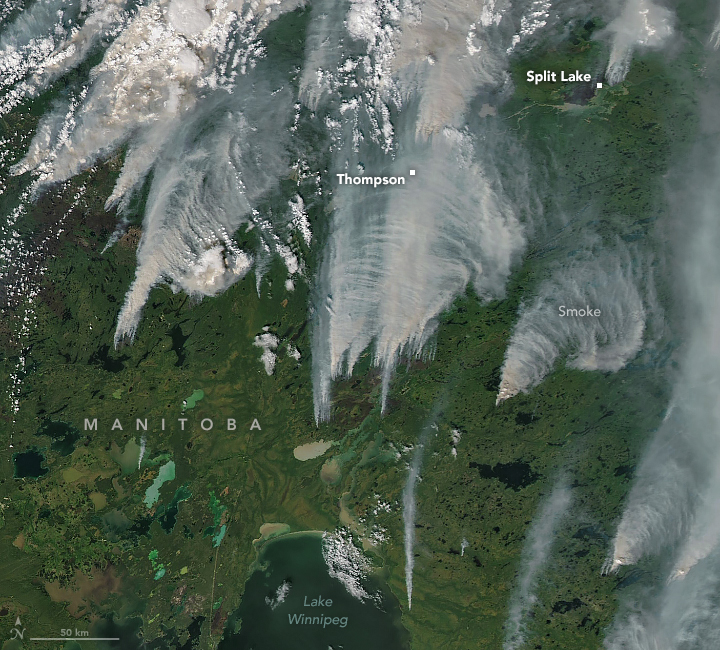
- The Thunderhill Lake Complex Fire in Manitoba (June 21); Satellite image of wildfires in Saskatchewan (May 13); Firefighters in Flin Flon (June 1); Satellite image of fires in Manitoba (July 9)
- Date: May 2025 – November 2025
- Location: Manitoba; Ontario; Saskatchewan; Alberta; Quebec; Newfoundland and Labrador; New Brunswick; Nova Scotia

Statistics
- Total fires: 5,349 (as of September 16, 2025)
- Total area: 8.78 million ha (21.7 million acres) (as of September 16, 2025)

Impacts
- Deaths: 2
- Injuries: 1
- Evacuated: 85,000
- Structures destroyed: 631+

Map
- Perimeters of 2025 Canadian wildfires - season to date (map data)

The 2025 Canadian wildfire season began with over 160 wildfires across the country in mid-May 2025 primarily in Manitoba, Ontario and Saskatchewan. Two civilians died in the town of Lac du Bonnet located northeast of Winnipeg. Manitoba and Saskatchewan declared respective month-long states of emergency on May 28 and May 29, while fires formed or spread through the summer in British Columbia, Alberta, Quebec, Newfoundland and Labrador, the Yukon, and the Northwest Territories. Manitoba declared a second state of emergency on July 10 as a second wave of fires hit the region. Atlantic Canada faced heat waves and extreme fire conditions in early August, and fires began breaking out in Nova Scotia, New Brunswick, and the island of Newfoundland. In late August and early September, fires forced evacuations in the Northwest Territories and the interior of British Columbia. Over half of the area burned in 2025 was in Manitoba and Saskatchewan, while Alberta, British Columbia, and Ontario all saw fires above annual averages.

The 2025 fires continued a series of severe wildfire season in Canada. Though wildfires are a natural part of the boreal forest life cycle, climate change driven by fossil fuel consumption led to higher temperatures, drier conditions, and longer fire seasons. The 2024 wildfires were among the worst in history, and the 2023 Canadian wildfires were unprecedented in their destruction, with some fires in 2025 starting as holdover "zombie" fires from 2023. By mid-June, the 2025 fires were on track to be the second-worst on record in terms of carbon emissions and area burned, and by August they had surpassed the 1989 season, trailing only 2023.

The fires forced the evacuations of 85,000 people, of whom 45,000 were from First Nations. The entire city of Flin Flon, Manitoba was evacuated in May, and in June much of the nearby village of Denare Beach, Saskatchewan was destroyed. The fires required the mobilization of the Canadian Armed Forces to aid in logistical and firefighting efforts, and hundreds of international firefighters joined efforts to combat the blazes. The fires damaged or destroyed large numbers of homes, cottages, and other structures, as well as critical infrastructure such as water treatment facilities. Smoke from the fires caused hazardous air quality across the continent, triggering air quality alerts in major metropolitan areas in Canada and the United States. Smoke traveled as far as Europe, causing hazy conditions and a red-orange hue during dawn and dusk.

== Background ==
While wildfires are a natural part of the Canadian boreal forest life cycle, climate change has led to higher temperatures and drier conditions, leading in turn to more frequent and severe fires and a longer fire season. This led to 71% of the country facing abnormally dry conditions by the end of July, rivalling 2023 as one of the most widespread dry years on record and contributing to what would become a destructive fire season.

The 2023 Canadian wildfires were the most destructive in recorded Canadian history and the 2024 wildfire season, while less severe, was one of the worst. Overwintering "zombie" fires continued to smoulder under snow in Alberta and British Columbia in January 2025, some of which began 2023. Wildfire researcher Mike Flannigan stated that this is the first time he has observed such fires survive for over two years. The British Columbia Wildfire Service had detected 49 active wildfires in early June that started as zombie fires, all near Fort Nelson.

In Saskatchewan, rapid day-to-day shifts in temperature combined with low levels of snow created drought conditions; rather than seeping into the ground gradually and soaking the soil, snow would melt rapidly while the ground was still frozen and water would evaporate. Trees and grasses would rehydrate, grow, and dry out, leaving plentiful fuel. Boreal forests are more vulnerable to fire in the spring because deciduous tree have not yet grown their leaves, which store moisture. With warmer weather happening earlier in the year, fires become more likely. Fires in the spring are more likely to be caused by humans, for example via abandoned campfires or hot machinery, while fires in the summer are more likely to have natural causes like lightning.

About 14.3% of Canadian buildings sit in the wildland–urban interface, and about 79% of buildings are within 1 km (0.62 mi), putting them at risk of wildfire.

=== Preparation ===
After the 2023 fires, Canadian governments began buying new water bombers, but they are not expected to arrive until 2029 at the earliest because of backlogs in orders.

In preparation for 2025, Edmonton carried out its first-ever prescribed burns within city limits.

== Wildfires ==
2025 Canadian wildfires by month
	Jan	Feb	Mar	Apr	May	Jun	Jul	Aug	Sep	Oct	Nov	Dec	Total
Number of Fires	0	0	0	525	1,081	914	1,116	1,208	803	0	0	0	5,647
Area burned (Ha)	0	0	0	5,285	1,156,304	3,058,183	2,065,895	1,629,634	1,005,673	0	0	0	8,920,974

Area Burned Year-to-Date, as of September 30, 2025
Agency	Area burned	
Agency	hectares	acres
British Columbia	886,419	2,190,390
Yukon	169,217	418,140
Alberta	676,252	1,671,060
Northwest Territories	1,385,271	3,423,080
Saskatchewan	2,931,885	7,244,850
Manitoba	2,169,092	5,359,940
Ontario	597,522	1,476,510
Quebec	6,597	16,300
Newfoundland and Labrador	18,469	45,640
New Brunswick	3,275	8,090
Nova Scotia	8,646	21,360
Prince Edward Island	0	0
Parks Canada	68,163	168,430
Total	8,920,807	22,043,790

=== Alberta ===
A wildfire near Elk Island National Park reached the Ukrainian Cultural Heritage Village on April 18, damaging or destroying several buildings. While no historic buildings were lost, the affected structures housed many artifacts that were destroyed. The village was closed for the season and cancelled all events to allow for restoration.

In early May, parts of Alberta were under "extreme" fire risk because of a combination of drought, heat, and high winds. About 100 people were evacuated near County of Grande Prairie over the weekend of May 3 but were able to return on May 5. On May 6, several communities in northern Alberta faced evacuation alerts and orders with individuals and livestock. A wildfire that began after an ATV caught fire in the Redwater Provincial Recreation Area forced the evacuation of some of the community of Redwater, while nearby Thorhild County saw more than 40 homes and 70 people evacuated. Over 800 residents of the village of Boyle were evacuated on May 6 before being allowed to return on May 8.

About 1,300 residents of Swan Hills were ordered to evacuate on May 26. On May 29, eight firefighters responding to Chipewyan Lake temporarily lost radio contact and were forced to shelter in place. They were able to escape the next day after forestry crews cleared downed trees from roads, but the fires destroyed 27 structures including critical infrastructure in Chipewyan Lake: its water treatment facility, senior centre, and health centre. Production at some oil sands locations was shut down and workers were evacuated because of fires. As of June 6, the province estimated that 4,625 Albertans had been forced to leave their homes.

The County of Grande Prairie issued evacuation orders again on June 7 after the Kiskatinaw River wildfire crossed the border from British Columbia. A fire between Dunmore and Irvine caused a brief evacuation of a dozen residences in Cypress County on September 22.

=== British Columbia ===
Northeast British Columbia was in the midst of a multi-year drought in 2025, spanning six or seven years. The Prince George Fire Centre, which covers 330,000 km^{2} (130,000 mi^{2}) of the northeast's area, saw 10% of its land burned in the prior two years, more than that of the previous 60 years combined. The area's boreal and sub-boreal forests are especially prone to wildfire because of their deep organic soils, which can house overwintering "zombie" fires, some of which had been burning since 2023. By May 2, there were 26 wildfires in the province with two being out of control. One forced the evacuation of part of Fort St. John for one day after a fire broke out near Northern Lights College. Roughly 70 people were evacuated from Peace River Regional District on May 29.

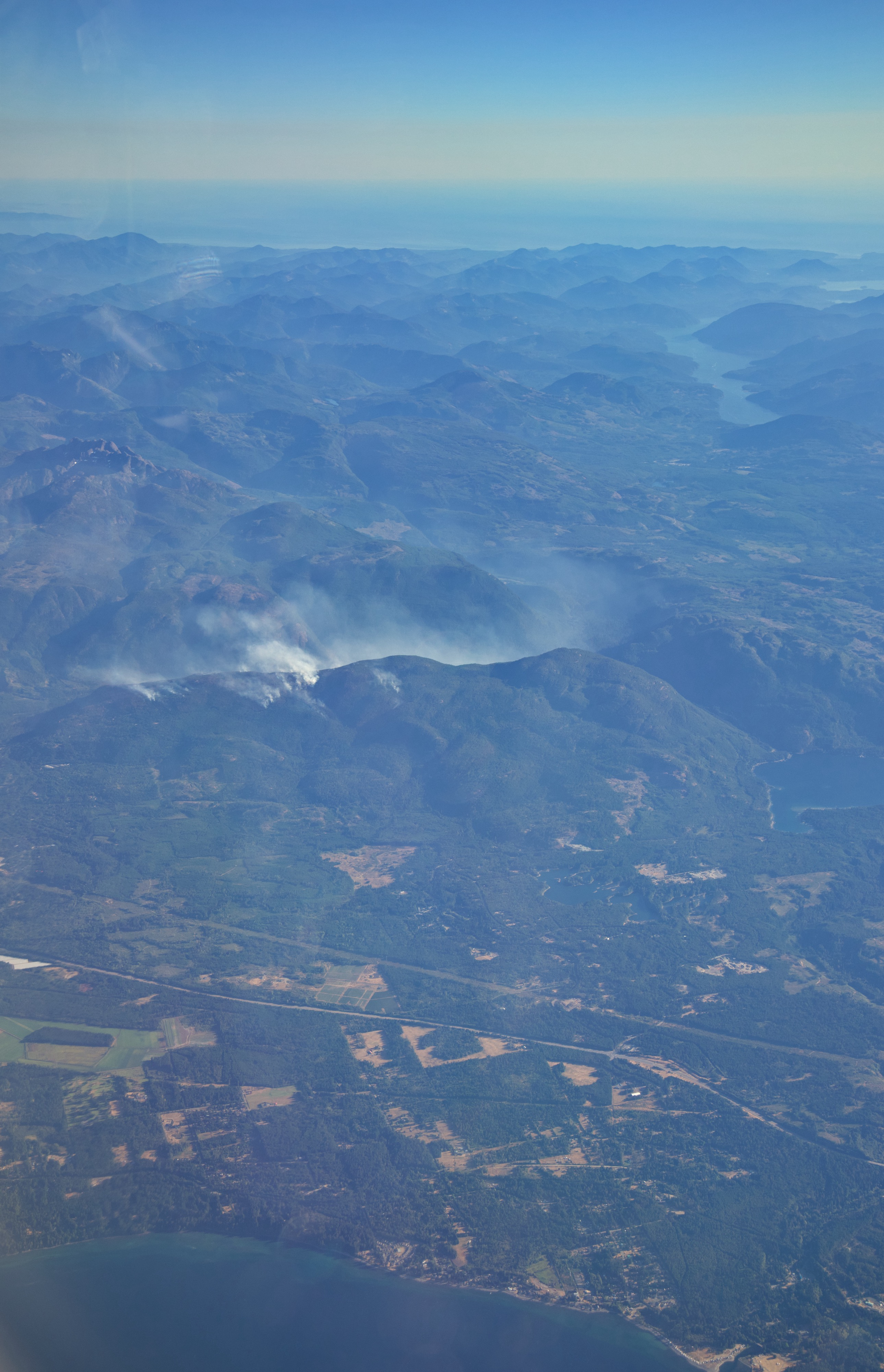
Aerial photo of the Cameron Lake wildfire on August 10.

Kelly Lake faced a severe fire from its west, the Kiskatinaw River wildfire, resulting in a series of evacuations on June 4. The fire continued to grow to its north and south, crossing into Alberta on June 6. There were 49 active wildfires that had overwintered from 2024. Those fires jumped Highway 97, closing the road and forcing evacuations at nearby properties as well as the Fort Nelson First Nation evacuating the Kahntah area. Fires also closed the highway between Prophet River and Sikanni Brake Check.

Southern British Columbia faced a heat wave in early June, and a human-caused fire grew out of control west of Port Alberni on Vancouver Island. On the mainland, a fire broke out on June 9 near Squamish and resulted in an evacuation alert for several properties in the area. As the fire grew, Alice Lake Provincial Park was closed and evacuated. Fires near Chase forced evacuations on Neskonlith Indian Band land on June 30. An out of control fire near Lytton on July 1 led to a state of emergency in Blue Sky County and evacuations of some properties. The fire is believed to have been caused by a spark from a malfunction from an RCMP trailer.

A firefighter scouting the Summit Lake fire near Fort Nelson suffered minor injuries after being scratched and bitten by a grizzly bear on July 4. The Whelan Creek fire shut down Kelowna Airport and forced evacuations of seven properties on July 6, but was brought under control the evening of July 7 and air service was restored.

From June to mid-July, over 7,000 km^{2} (2,700 mi^{2}) of the Prince George Fire Centre had burned, and it was expected that by the end of the year over 30% of the area's forested land base would be burned. Between July 30 and August 1, over 35,000 lightning strikes were recorded in the province, sparking 65 fires in the interior of the province, Fraser Valley, and Vancouver Island. Fires in Peachland led to evacuations on July 30, though 498 properties had their evacuation orders lifted by August 1 after the fires were held. Fires on the north shore of Cameron Lake on Vancouver Island led to a local state of emergency and a few dozen homes being evacuated and 289 placed on evacuation alerts. The Mount Underwood fire began rapidly growing August 11 near Port Alberni, reaching 14 km^{2} (5.4 mi^{2}) and leading to the evacuation of 300 people from a campground. The fire knocked out power for 500 properties and grew to over 21 km^{2} (8.1 mi^{2}) the next day. The BC Wildfire Service stated that such extreme fire behaviour is unusual on Vancouver Island and followed unprecedented dry conditions, hot weather, and strong winds. Port Alberni declared a local state of emergency and evacuation orders were issued for hundreds of properties along the east side of the Alberni Inlet and those in rural areas between Port Alberni and Nitinat.

A 60 km^{2} (23 mi^{2}) fire in the Cariboo region between Tweedsmuir Park and Itcha Ilgachuz Provincial Park led to evacuation orders on August 2 for 150 parcels of land and multiple First Nations reserves. The fire is suspected to have been caused by lightning. Separate wildfires closed Highway 5 between Hope and Merritt and Highway 20 east of Bella Coola and west of Anahim Lake. The following day, about 1,500 people were evacuated from Anahim Lake because of the Beef Trail Creek wildfire. The B.C. Wildfire Service stated on September 2 that one of its birddog aircraft was struck by an illegally-operating civilian drone.

=== Manitoba ===
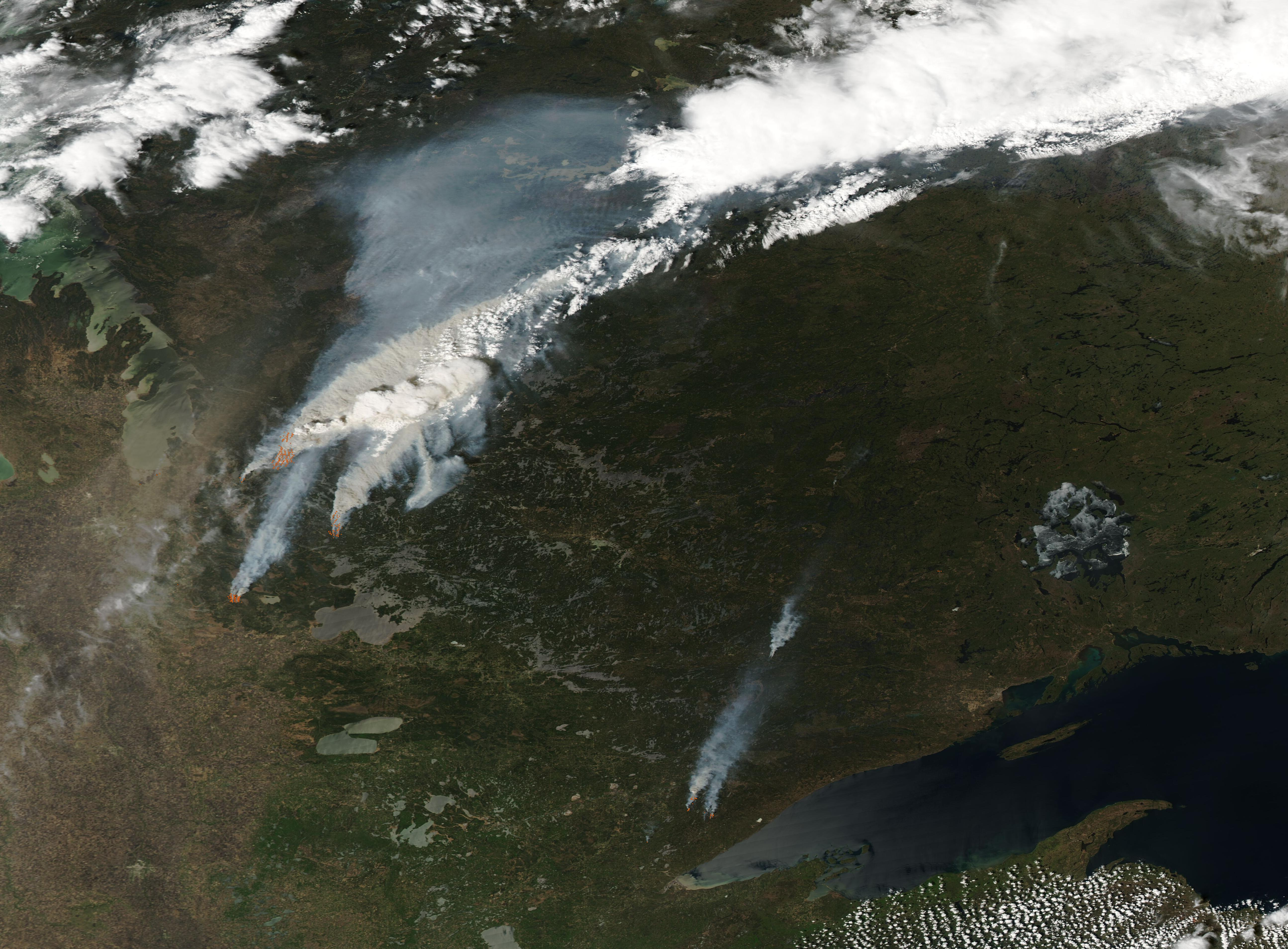
A satellite image from May 13, 2025, shows plumes of smoke from fires in Manitoba, Ontario, and Minnesota.

In Manitoba during mid-May, five fires were classified as "out of control". Fire conditions were exacerbated by a concurrent heat wave, with Winnipeg recording a temperature of 37 °C (99 °F) on May 13, breaking a temperature record that had stood for 125 years.

A wildfire located north of Whiteshell Provincial Park grew to over 100,000 hectares (250,000 acres). Dense smoke from the fire hampered aerial firefighting operations, forcing crews to focus on property protection in safer areas. A fire of 42,000 ha (100,000 acres) in northwestern Manitoba had approximately forty firefighters from British Columbia assigned to it since May 13. A fire in Piney close to the Manitoba-United States border grew to 7,000 hectares (17,000 acres).

On May 13, a severe wildfire near the town of Lac du Bonnet, northeast of Winnipeg, resulted in two civilian fatalities. The victims, identified as a married man and woman, perished when they became trapped at home by rapidly advancing flames. Firefighters were unable to reach them due to the fire's intensity. Mayor of Lac du Bonnet Ken Lodge noted that the fire developed and spread at an exceptional speed and intensity. The fire expanded to approximately 4,000 ha (9,900 acres), necessitating the evacuation of roughly 1,000 residents from the town and surrounding communities. It destroyed twenty-eight structures in the Grausdin Point area. The province declared a state of emergency near Whiteshell Provincial Park the same day. At that time, there were approximately 1,200 evacuees in Manitoba from nearby fires in Ontario, in addition to evacuees from within the province. On May 25, a firefighter was severely injured and hospitalized.

Lynn Lake, which has about 600 residents, was evacuated on May 27 because of a 7,000 ha (17,000 acres) fire. Provincial investigators later alleged the fire was caused by a smouldering burn pile near an Alamos Gold mine that the company failed to extinguish several weeks earlier.

A fire at a landfill in Creighton, Saskatchewan began to spread towards neighbouring Flin Flon at the end of May. Water bombers fighting fires in the area were temporarily grounded because of unauthorized drone activity. Flin Flon and Creighton were ordered to evacuate on May 28. The province had the highest wildfire activity in the country at this point, with 96 fires (compared to 77 for a typical full year) and over 198,000 ha (490,000 acres) burned, approximately triple the five-year annual average. The fires pushed hotels in the province to capacity and premier Wab Kinew requested Manitoban communities and companies take in evacuees. Kinew also announced a state of emergency for the province and stated that about 17,000 people would be evacuated from northern Manitoba.

On May 31, the roughly 600 residents from Cranberry Portage community in northwestern Manitoba were placed under a mandatory evacuation order after fire caused a power outage and closed Highway 10. An evacuation of the Pimicikamak Cree Nation, which started earlier in the week, ramped up further on May 31 with officials expecting five flights to leave for Winnipeg by the end of the day. Mathias Colomb First Nation was evacuated at the end of May with the order lasting over 100 days—the longest in the province—after its electric infrastructure was destroyed and jurisdictional disputes between Manitoba Hydro and Indigenous Services Canada delayed acquisition of a generator.

Firefighters faced limited options in defending Flin Flon going into the weekend of May 30 as the wildfire smoke was too thick for water bombers and resources were stretched thin by the numerous other fires. The city's mayor, George Fontaine, stated that Flin Flon was at the mercy of shifting winds, which, if turned towards the city, "could be very catastrophic". About 200 personnel continued to keep the blaze at the city's edge, along with two helitankers, three helicopter buckets, three water bombers, and 19 firetrucks. Though crews made some progress repelling the fire, temperatures of 25 °C (77 °F) and wind gusts of 50 km/h (31 mph) pushed it back towards the city. Fires nearly encircled the city on June 4 and firefighters began raiding grocery stores because of low food supplies. The fires destroyed some structures outside of the city but improvements in weather helped to keep it at bay.

The large-scale evacuations presented logistical challenges. Several conferences in Manitoba were postponed or cancelled to free up hotel rooms for evacuees and Pimicikamak Cree Nation Chief David Monias called for the government to invoke the Emergency Measures Act to free up more space. He also expressed frustration with some residents who refused to evacuate. Pimicikamak, which was ordered evacuated on May 28, faced a bottleneck as high winds and heavy smoke closed its airport and left the ferry as the main evacuation method, leading to nine-hour waits that forced some residents to turn around. The Canadian military had helped evacuated 3,500 people from fire zones in the province by June 3. Snow Lake, which had been hosting some evacuees from Flin Flon, was itself placed under evacuation alert on June 3. Between 600 and 800 evacuees were sent to Niagara Falls, Ontario because of local hotel shortages. The government of Manitoba asked the public to cancel any non-essential travel to help free up resources as over 21,000 people had registered as evacuees by June 9. The province-wide state of emergency was lifted on June 23.

==== Second state of emergency ====
Some communities faced multiple evacuations or new crises. Tataskweyak Cree Nation, which had declared a state of emergency on May 29 from approaching fires and was evacuated the next day, declared a new state of emergency on June 17 as its water treatment facility stopped working. Seven homes were destroyed by fires on July 4. Lynn Lake's evacuation order was lifted on June 20, but it was once again evacuated July 4 after a lightning strike sparked a new fire. Fires reached within about 8 km (5.0 mi) of the nearby city of Thompson, which was acting as a local hub for evacuees. The city declared a state of emergency on July 7, and the province declared its second state of emergency July 10 following several mandatory evacuations. Snow Lake was evacuated a second time on the same day.

Garden Hill First Nation, which is only accessible by air, began evacuations on July 11. About 1,750 of its 4,000 residents were evacuated to Winnipeg by emergency airlifts the following two days with support from Canadian Armed Forces Hercules aircraft. Thomson issued a pre-alert notice for potential evacuation on July 11 as it prepared to receive international firefighting assistance from Mexico and Australia. Communities around Island Lake began evacuating about 500 vulnerable residents on July 14 after declaring local states of emergency. At this point, about 12,000 people in the province were evacuees. As of August 7, the Canadian Red Cross had registered over 31,000 evacuees from 12,000 households in Manitoba.

The second state of emergency was extended and expired on August 22.

=== Newfoundland and Labrador ===
The fire season in Newfoundland and Labrador began early following hot and dry weather, according to Jamie Tippett, a deputy minister with the provincial forestry department. In early May, wildfires formed north of Conception Bay North and led to evacuations and states of emergency in Small Point-Adam's Cove-Blackhead-Broad Cove and Western Bay, destroying 45 structures, including 12 homes. The area is home to about 400 permanent residents plus seasonal residents. The fires reduced air quality in St. John's and the north of the Avalon Peninsula. Fires also formed in Fermeuse on the peninsula and Joe's Lake near the town of Badger but were brought under control.

Labrador saw diminished snowfall in the winter, with a snowpack of 257.1 cm (101.2 in) compared to 388 cm (153 in) the previous year. Much of western Labrador faced extreme fire risk on May 28 and fires near Churchill Falls forced the closure of the Trans-Labrador Highway, which connect it to Happy Valley-Goose Bay. The fires also caused power outages in Labrador City, Wabush, and Fermont, Quebec.

Badger was evacuated on June 18 as an out of control fire was about 600 metres (2,000 ft) away. About 800 people registered with the Canadian Red Cross and stayed at the Joe Byrne Memorial Stadium to the east in Grand Falls-Windsor. The fire is suspected to have been sparked by a lightning strike before growing to 650 ha (1,600 acres). The fire reached within 300 to 400 metres (980 to 1,310 ft) of the town and burned 1,119 ha (2,770 acres), but firefighting and favourable weather led to the evacuation order being lifted on June 20. Remote fires continued through July but did not threaten infrastructure or settlements.

A fire on the Bonavista Peninsula, near Chance Harbour, broke out on July 14 and grew to over 1,200 ha (3,000 acres), destroying a number of cabins but did not affect any communities. Another fire started near the town of Musgrave Harbour on July 19 in the Pine Pond area. An evacuation alert was announced the same day for residents to be prepared incase the fire moved towards the town, however no evacuation was necessary. The fire grew to over 1,500 ha (3,700 acres), but as of July 25 it was classified as being held.

On August 3, a wildfire broke out in Kingston, Conception Bay North, an unincorporated area south of Small Point-Adam's Cove-Blackhead-Broad Cove. Early the next afternoon, evacuation orders were issued for both Kingston and Small Point-Adam's Cove-Blackhead-Broad Cove as the fire burned out of control, spreading north and south. Western Bay, located immediately north of Small Point-Adam's Cove-Blackhead-Broad Cove, was also ordered to evacuate at 11:30pm that night. The nearby unincorporated area of Ochre Pit Cove was placed under an evacuation alert. The Persalvic School Complex in Victoria was designated as the evacuation centre. The Government of Newfoundland and Labrador provided a live update at noon the next day, August 5. Premier John Hogan stated the Kingston fire had tripled in size overnight to an estimated 720 ha (1,800 acres). The unincorporated area of Perry's Cove was also ordered to evacuate, and an evacuation alert was placed for the nearby town of Salmon Cove.

Lisa Dempster, Minister of Fisheries, Forestry and Agriculture, announced on August 5 that a province-wide fire ban was in effect until at least September 7. The provincial government also stated that its request to the Canadian Interagency Forest Fire Centre had been fulfilled, and three additional aircraft from New Brunswick would assist in wildfire suppression efforts. The province requested federal assistance from the Government of Canada, which was granted on August 7. The Canadian Armed Forces were deployed to provide immediate assistance to the province, including aerial reconnaissance to assess the wildfire situation and personnel to assist with planning and coordination efforts. Military firefighters were also made available to support firefighting operations. The Canadian Coast Guard committed up to three helicopters, two comfort trailers and a personnel officer to augment the effects of the Provincial Emergency Operations Centre.

The Kingston fire reached an estimated 2,200 ha (5,400 acres) by August 7 with the most active area located along its western edge. Premier Hogan announced evacuation orders that day for two more communities in Conception Bay North: Ochre Pit Cove and Salmon Cove. Victoria was placed under an evacuation alert. With an evacuation alert now within five kilometres of the evacuation centre, it was relocated to Carbonear Academy, in the neighbouring town of Carbonear. Premier Hogan also stated bulldozers had been added to the firefighting efforts to create fire breaks.

While the response to the Kingston fire was still ramping up, another wildfire broke out in Holyrood on August 4, along the Conception Bay Highway near Duff Straight. Residents from Beaumont Place to the bridge at the entrance of Holyrood were evacuated shortly after the fire broke out. An evacuation order was also issued in Conception Bay South for residents between 1820 Conception Bay Highway and the town's western boundary. An evacuation alert was declared for the area between 1375 and 1820 Conception Bay Highway. The Holyrood fire was estaimted at 20 ha (49 acres) on August 5. That afternoon, evacuation orders were expanded to include areas from Holyrood's northeastern boundary down to the Irving gas station along route 60. The wildfire also forced the evacuation and temporary closure of Burry Heights Camp on Salmonier Line. The evacuation centre for affected residents was relocated on August 6 from Robert French Memorial Stadium to a large facility at Villa Nova Junior High in Conception Bay South. By the August 7 update, the fire in Holyrood remained active but had not grown further, holding at 22 ha (55 acres).

The Grand Falls-Windsor fire department stated on August 5 that they were made aware of a fire burning near Bay d'Espoir Highway, forcing the immediate evacuation of cabin owners in the Martin Lake and Great Rattling Brook areas. A ground crew and helicopter were responding to this fire, located 36 km (22 mi) from the Trans-Canada Highway. Its size was roughly 60 ha (150 acres) as of August 4. The wildfire—now referred to as the Martin Lake Fire—had grown to 220 ha (540 acres) by August 7, and the evacuation order was expanded to include cabins from Rushy Pond to Rifle Lake. The fire was burning approximately two kilometres from the Bay d'Espoir Highway, raising the possibility that the highway may need to close.

The fires in Western Bay continued to grow over the weekend of August 9. Thick smoke made it difficult to assess the damage from fires, and about 3,000 people in the province had been evacuated. The province announced on August 11 that it would provide $500 to evacuated residents forced to leave their primary residence, and the premier stated that two water bombers from Ontario and 80 firefighters from the Armed Forces were being deployed to combat fires. On August 12, Premier Hogan stated the size of the Kingston was over 6,300 ha in size.

On August 11, a wildfire broke out near Paddy's Pond in the City of St. John's. Water bombers servicing the Kingston Fire were quickly rerouted to assist the St. John's Regional Fire Department. Due to extreme heat and gusty winds, Paddy's Pond Industrial Park was evacuated and the Trans-Canada Highway was shut down. By that evening, the fire spread to just over 200 hectares, forcing the Towns of Paradise and Conception Bay South, with support from government, to issue evacuation alerts for roughly 13,000-15,000 residents. Several events at the 2025 Canada Summer Games had to be postponed or moved due to the evacuation alerts. A transmission line belonging to NL Hydro was damaged from the fires, however, no outages were reported.

On August 12, Premier Hogan announced the regional state of emergency was being expanded to include parts of St. John's near the Paddy's Pond fire. The evacuation alert issued the day before for parts of Paradise and Conception Bay South was also being expanded to include Southlands and Galway. Hogan also stated that Ochre Pit Cove and Western Bay likely had "significant loss". Minister John Haggie stated the alert expansion added an extra 5,400 residents, bringing the total number of residents under evacuation alert to 20,400.

On the evening of August 12, residents in Paradise near the Three Island Pond region were ordered to evacuate due to threat of the Paddy's Pond fire jumping Peacekeeper's Way. The Kingston fire grew to 8,019 ha (19,820 acres) by August 13 and had destroyed about 100 homes. The Paddy's Pond fire was at 306 ha (760 acres) and the Martin Lake fire reached 2,160 ha (5,300 acres) and had destroyed some cabins. The next day, weather conditions grounded air support, and the government confirmed that the Kingston fire had destroyed Cabot Academy elementary school.

On August 14, 2025, the unincorporated community of Job's Cove was put under evacuation alert due to the Kingston Fire. On August 15, 2025, residents of the Three Island Pond region in Paradise were allowed to return as the evacuation order from August 12 was lifted. On August 16, 2025, the regional state of emergency in Paradise, Conception Bay South, Galway, and Southlands was lifted. The unincorporated community of Freshwater, close to Carbonear, was put under evacuation alert. The Kingston fire was reported at 10,708 ha (26,460 acres) on August 19 and had destroyed 203 structures.

On August 30, 2025, the Kingston fire was classified as under control and all evacuation orders were lifted.

=== New Brunswick ===
In early August, New Brunswick faced extreme wildfire conditions and barred people from forests. Cities throughout the province closed outdoor trails, and on August 10 a wildfire formed in Maple Hills, about 20 km (12 mi) north of Moncton. Firefighting operations reduced water quality in and resulted in a boil-water advisory for parts of Moncton. Fires near Miramichi also led to evacuation orders for four properties and an alert for another 15. Environment minister John Herron stated on August 11 that a fire near Irishtown was of "extraordinary" concern and nearby residents were told to prepare for evacuation. Premier Susan Holt had also asked for help from the governments of Prince Edward Island, Nova Scotia, and Maine.

=== Northwest Territories ===
Much of the Northwest Territories faced high or extreme wildfire risk in mid-June following very hot and dry weather. Fires began forming in the Dehcho and North Slave Regions, with some requiring water bombers and support crews. On July 7, the community of Jean Marie River issued an evacuation alert as a fire was 24 km (15 mi) away; the alert was downgraded to a notice on July 12. Fire conditions persisted and crews from the Northwest Territories and the Yukon continued to fight fires and prevent their spread via land, air, and water in the Dehcho, North Slave, and Beaufort Delta Regions. Jean Marie River issued a second evacuation alert on July 27 as fire FS014, which had threatened it earlier, grew close again. The alert was lifted August 22, but the community was placed on its third evacuation notice on August 30. Rain helped to stymie the fire, and the evacuation alert was lifted September 15. One cabin was destroyed.

The community of Whatì—approximately 600 people—was placed on evacuation notice on August 25 after lightning had sparked wildfire ZF048 south of the area. The fire was estimated at 1,234 ha (3,050 acres) and the area faced significant fire weather, drought conditions, and low precipitation. The fire grew rapidly, covering about 8.5 km (5.3 mi) in one day, and the government issued air quality warnings for the area. The notice was upgraded to an evacuation alert on August 27, and the community declared a local state of emergency and was ordered to evacuate on August 29 as the fire was 7 kilometres (4.3 mi) south of its airport. The fire had traveled 4 km (2.5 mi) the previous night and reached 10,000 ha (25,000 acres) in size. Firefighters used favourable wind conditions to burn off vegetation to the south of Whatì, creating a firebreak. Residents were able to return September 5.

Wildfire SS014 began naturally July 7 and by August 30 had burned 18,429 ha (45,540 acres), threatening the hamlet of Fort Providence. The community of 600 was placed on evacuation alert, but the fire moved 11 km (6.8 mi) overnight and Fort Providence was ordered to evacuate the morning of August 31. The Yellowknife Highway leading north to the territory's capital also closed until September 1. The next day, all emergency and essential personnel were evacuated as strong winds pushed the fire—which had grown to 89,000 ha (220,000 acres)—within 1 km of the community. Many residents sheltered in Hay River, while others camped and about 30 residents stayed at Kátł'odeeche First Nation. The evacuation order was lifted September 11.

=== Nova Scotia ===
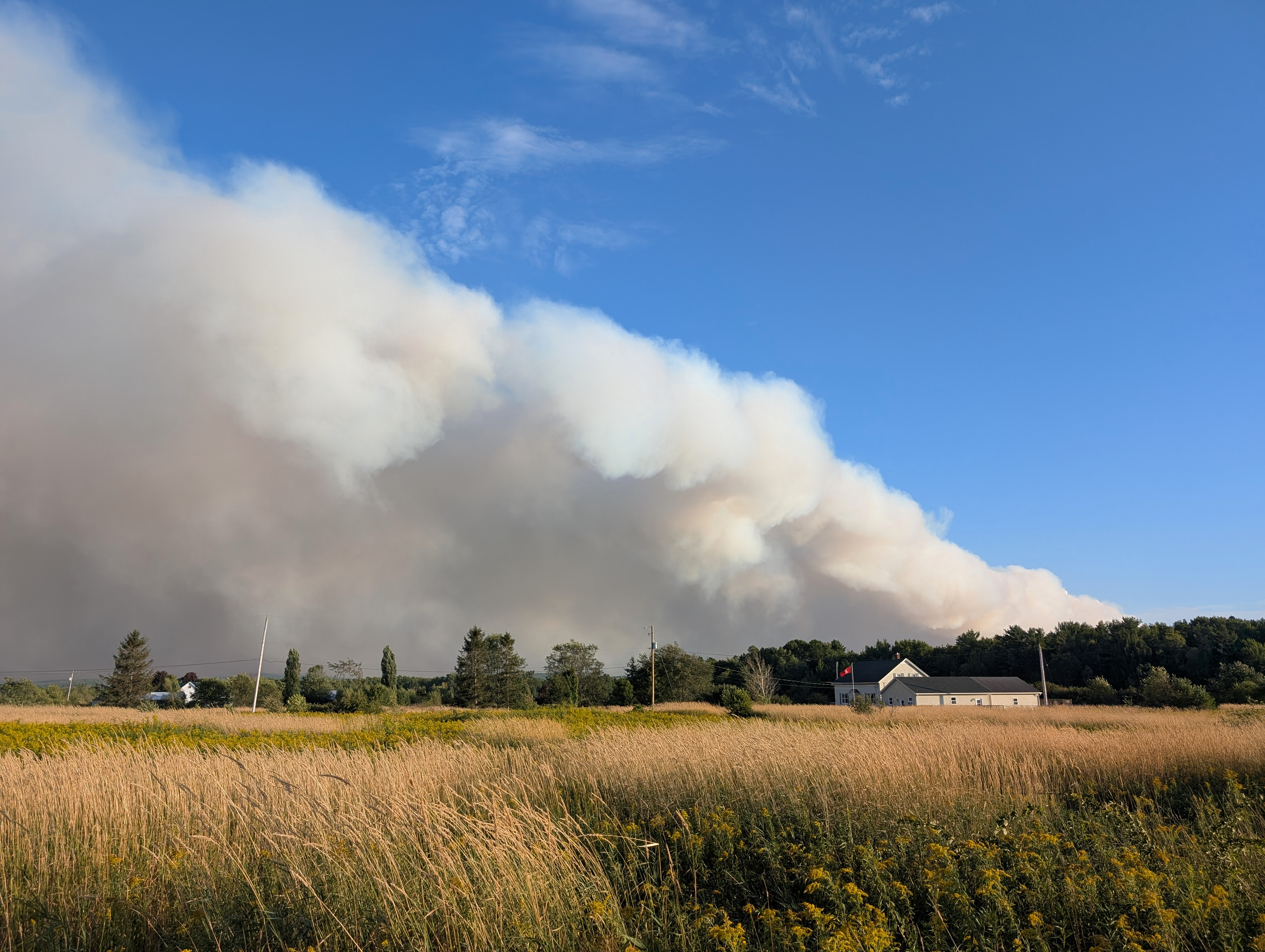
Smoke from the Long Lake wildfires complex of Annapolis County seen from Middleton, Nova Scotia, on August 24, 2025.

A forest fire near Musquodoboit Harbour forced the evacuation of about 100 homes the afternoon of June 22, though some were allowed to return later in the day as fires stabilized.

By the end of July, the entire province was experiencing drought conditions, ranging from "abnormally dry" in some areas to severe drought (normally a one-in-ten-years event) in Annapolis Valley, Cumberland County, Cape Breton, and central Nova Scotia. The province did not see significant rain from the beginning of June onwards. Citing extreme fire risk, the province instituted a ban on hiking, camping, fishing, and using vehicles such as all-terrain vehicles on all provincial Crown lands on August 5, which was set to last until October 15 or weather conditions improve. Similar bans were imposed in 2001, 2006, and 2023, and the Department of Natural Resources stated that since almost all wildfires in the province are from human activity, the ban was justified. The government faced some pushback on the ban as too onerous, or being overly punitive rather than addressing the problems of climate change. To challenge the ban in court, a former candidate for the People's Party of Canada recorded himself deliberately violating it by hiking in a forest in Cape Breton, and receiving a $28,872.50 fine. The ban was lifted in phases, beginning on August 29, and finally in Annapolis County on October 15.

Fire broke out in a wooded area near Bayers Lake, immediately west of Halifax on August 12. A helicopter and four tanker planes were dispatched to as several roads were closed; nearby businesses as well as the Bayers Lake Community Outpatient Centre were evacuated. Smoke from the fire was visible from the west end of Halifax. Water bombing operations were temporarily paused that evening because of an unauthorized drone. The fire was later confirmed to have been human-caused after crews found an open fire in the area. The fire was contained and the evacuation orders were lifted on August 14.

Lightning likely caused a fire near Long Lake in Annapolis County, which grew to around 300 ha (740 acres) on August 14 and led to the evacuation of 42 homes. The evacuation order was expanded later in the day to 107 homes, affecting 205 people. On August 15, a helicopter fighting the Long Lake wildfires crashed in shallow water, injuring the pilot. Despite some rainfall, the fire reached 2,000 ha (4,900 acres) on August 18 and was the only remaining out-of-control fire from the previous week. Over 200 firefighters—including 120 local firefighters, 77 from the Department of Natural Resources, 20 from Ontario, and five from PEI—were part of a ground force, in addition to four planes from the Northwest Territories and two helicopters. The fire remained stable at 3,210 ha (7,900 acres) for several days, but anticipated strong winds from Hurricane Erin made predicting the fire's course difficult. The fire roughly doubled to 7,780 ha (19,200 acres) by August 25. Government officials stated 20 residences and 11 outbuildings were destroyed and over 1000 people had been evacuated. The Long Lake fire set a record with 26 consecutive days of air quality warnings and advisories, from August 14 to September 8.

The Long Lake fire was officially brought under control September 27. However, a new fire broke out the next day in Lake George, Kings County. That fire grew to 80 ha (200 acres) on September 29, leading to the evacuations of over 100 homes. Under dry conditions and strong winds, the fire grew to 150 ha (370 acres) and 275 civic addresses were evacuated. On October 1, as the area continued to experience dry conditions and high winds, further evacuations were ordered as the wildfire expanded to 290 ha. The fire season, which normally ends on October 15, was extended to October 31 because of the fire.

=== Ontario ===
An out-of-control fire that originated in Ingolf, Ontario in the Kenora District on May 12 spread into Manitoba on May 15. The fire was estimated at 23,000 hectares (57,000 acres) on the Ontario side, with officials having not yet determined the extent of its encroachment into Manitoba. The Wabaseemoong Independent Nations, about 100 kilometres (62 mi) northwest of Kenora, was fully evacuated with about 800 people being flown to Niagara Falls while a few dozen went to Winnipeg. The Kenora 20 fire was confirmed to have destroyed some structures.

On May 14, the Ontario Ministry of Natural Resources issued an implementation order for areas surrounding the fire designated as "Sioux Lookout 3." The wildfire, first reported on May 13, was located north of Savant Lake and had expanded to cover more than 2,000 hectares (4,900 acres). Another wildfire designated as "Fort Frances 4" located north of Crystal Lake grew to over 3,200 hectares (7,900 acres) as of May 15. The Sioux Lookout 3 forced the evacuation of Ojibway Nation of Saugeen. Canadian Armed Forces were deployed to evacuate areas in and around Sandy Lake First Nation, a fly-in community in the northwest, after the Red Lake 12 wildfire grew to over 150,000 ha (370,000 acres). Nineteen construction workers narrowly escaped the fire by sheltering in a shipping container after the fires travelled 40 km (25 mi) between morning and noon and engulfed their site.

As Sandy Lake First Nation residents began returning, efforts were paused in early July because of a spike in new fires. Over 2,000 people began evacuating from Pikangikum and North Spirit Lake First Nation to Thunder Bay, Mississauga, and Toronto on July 11. The Red Lake 62 fire had grown to 24,000 ha (59,000 acres) and was 62 kilometres (39 mi) away from Pikangikum, while the Red Lake 40 fire threatening North Spirit Lake had reached 11,000 ha (27,000 acres) and several other large fires formed in the region. Pikangikum lost power on July 12 while residents were being evacuated, and five other communities (Deer Lake, Sandy Lake, Poplar Hill, North Spirit Lake, Keewaywin First Nations) soon followed with their own outages. Internet, cellular, and telephone services went down as Red Lake 62 grew to 31,000 ha (77,000 acres). Food spoiled and homes overheated until power was restored on July 15.

A 27 ha (67 acres) fire in the Kawartha Lakes region was out-of-control August 11, with fire crews working to contain it.

=== Prince Edward Island ===
Prince Edward Island instituted a fire ban on August 11 as the province faced extreme wildfire risk.

=== Saskatchewan ===
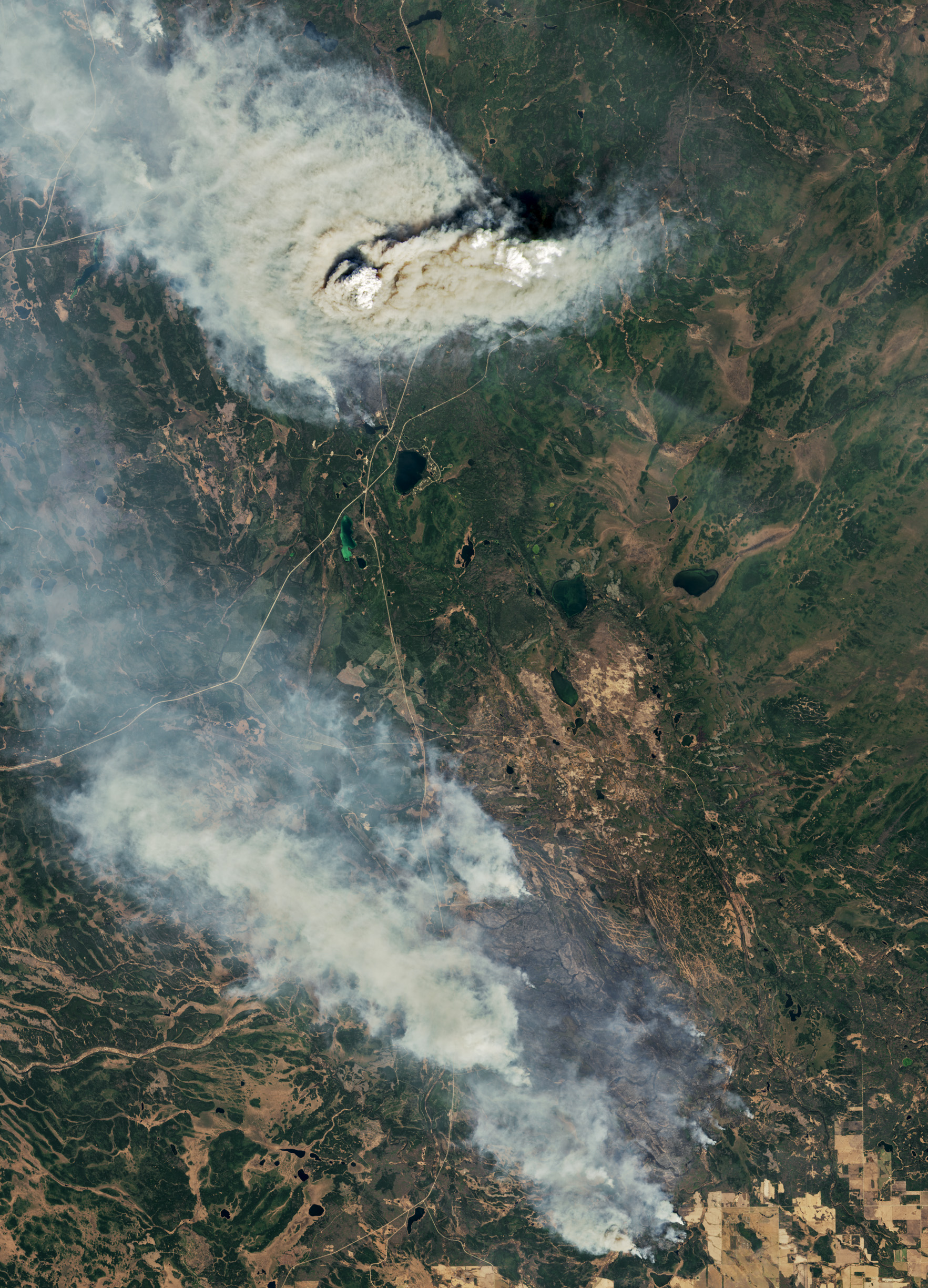
Satellite image of wildfires in Saskatchewan on May 10, 2025. The Shoe fire is visible at the top and the Camp fire is visible at the bottom.

Saskatchewan entered the fire season after a relatively dry winter with snowpacks melting quickly after sudden jumps in temperature. By mid-May there were two fires of concern in Saskatchewan: the Shoe fire near Narrow Hills Provincial Park and the Camp fire near Candle Lake and Smeaton. The provincial park was closed and all highways in and out were closed to traffic, while the Camp fire was intense enough to produce pyrocumulonimbus clouds.

The two fires merged and grew to over 240,000 ha (590,000 acres) by May 27, destroyed a Saskatchewan Public Safety Agency fire base and forced its 280 firefighters and staff to flee, and led to the evacuation of about 500 people from Canoe Lake to the cities of Cold Lake and Lloydminster in Alberta. The Pisew fire reached 51,000 ha (130,000 acres) and led to the evacuation of 380 people from Hall Lake, and 27 people were evacuated from Brabant Lake because of the Jay Smith fire, which grew to 18,000 ha (44,000 acres). Pelican Narrows declared a state of emergency and 1,700 residents were evacuated because of the nearby Pelican 2 fire, which reached 850 ha (2,100 acres). The fires continued to threaten the area and about 4,000 people in total were evacuated by May 28.

The town of Creighton, which borders Flin Flon, was ordered to evacuate on May 28. That same day the First Nations of Lac La Ronge Indian Band, Peter Ballantyne Cree Nation and Montreal Lake Cree Nation declared a joint state of emergency as its leaders expressed "deep concerns" about shortages of firefighting resources and demanded meetings with members of parliament and premier Scott Moe. On May 29, the Camp fire reached a size of 300,000 ha (740,000 acres) and destroyed dozens of cabins around East Trout Lake. Moe declared a provincial state of emergency that day.

Communities within a 20 kilometres (12 mi) radius around La Ronge were ordered to evacuate on June 2 after the Pisew fire grew to 83,630 ha (206,700 acres) and breached the airport, affecting 7,500 people. The fires in the province destroyed 163 structures (including private properties such as homes, cabins, and sheds and provincial properties in parks) and the province estimated that a total of 8,000 people had been displaced. The Shoe fire grew to over 407,000 ha (1,010,000 acres). Denare Beach, which is southwest of Creighton and had been evacuated previously, was evacuated of all remaining firefighters and essential staff on June 2 as fires destroyed the southern half of the village. Fires reached La Ronge the night of June 3 and destroyed the Robertson Trading Post, which held hundreds of indigenous artifacts.

Provincially, the number of evacuees was estimated to have reached 15,000 and approximately 400 structures had been destroyed. The evacuations caused shortages of hotel spaces. On June 2, a group of evacuees in Saskatoon held a protest outside the first ministers' meeting demanding more resources for firefighting and evacuees. Julie Baschuk, the mayor of Air Ronge, wrote to premier Moe that many evacuees from her city were not able to access food or find shelter a week after being evacuated, with some forced to sleep in vehicles, tents or backyards. Ombdudsman Sharon Pratchler called on the province to make urgent improvements to how it treats evacuees.

Premier Moe announced on June 6 that two individuals had been charged with arson and one was related to a major wildfire, though this was not supported by RCMP statements.

The provincial state of emergency expired on June 27, lasting one month.

==== Second wave of fires ====
In early July, the village of Beauval declared a state of emergency and issued an evacuation order. About 800 people fled as they were threatened by the Bay fire, the Chudyk fire, and the Muskeg fire. The hamlet of Lac La Plonge also ordered an evacuation, as did English River First Nation. Fires blocked highway access to Patuanak, stranding its 700 residents. The community briefly lost access to electricity, but was not in immediate danger as the nearest fire was 60 km (37 mi) away. Officials from English River First Nation were stuck outside of the area, fuel and groceries could not be shipped in, garbage could not be shipped out. Vulnerable individuals from Patuanak such as elders, children, pregnant women, and those with medical conditions were airlifted to Buffalo Narrows and were then taken by bus to Lloydminster. Fires breached Beauval on July 10, destroying some structures, with the mayor stating he saw a wall of fire "100 feet tall" blocking one of the roads into town.

Shifting winds pushed the fires surrounding the village together, merging them into the massive, uncontrolled Muskeg fire, which threatened Beauval from three sides and required intense defensive efforts from firefighters from Quebec and crews piloting bulldozers and helicopters dropping buckets of water. Canoe narrows was ordered to fully evacuate for the second time on July 16.

By August 10, over 26,400 people in Saskatchewan had been forced to evacuate because of wildfires in 2025.

=== Quebec ===
As of May 11, SOPFEU had reported 59 wildfires in Quebec in 2025, which is 44 fewer than the 10-year average. On May 10, SOPFEU raised the fire danger rating for western Quebec, and also noted that a five-hectare fire started burning on May 10 in the Antoine-Labelle Regional County Municipality. Under the cause of the fire, the agency noted "residents". On May 11, a one-hectare fire started in Abitibi Regional County Municipality. Both fires were listed as under control. SOPFEU reported two active wildfires as conditions become favourable to wildfires with the snow melting. Regions Estrie, Montérégie, Centre-du-Québec, Montreal, Laval, Outaouais, Laurentides, Lanaudière and Chaudière-Appalaches had their fire danger index raised, while in addition, parts of the Mauricie, Capitale-Nationale, Bas-Saint-Laurent, Saguenay–Lac-Saint-Jean, Abitibi–Témiscamingue, Gaspésie–Îles-de-la-Madeleine and Côte-Nord are under a raised danger index. SOPFEU added "The rest of Quebec is still experiencing winter conditions, with substantial snow cover remaining in forested areas. In these northern regions, the wildfire risk is currently non-existent".

=== Yukon ===
By June 22, there were 63 fires burning in the Yukon. Fires near Dawson City triggered evacuation alerts. Over 40 of the fires from June 16 to June 22 were from lightning strikes. On June 24, an evacuation alert was issued for Ethel Lake. The alert was lifted July 1, but the fire remained out of control and had burned 743 ha (1,840 acres). Alerts were issued on July 4 for areas near Mayo, which were lifted on July 15.

== Responses ==
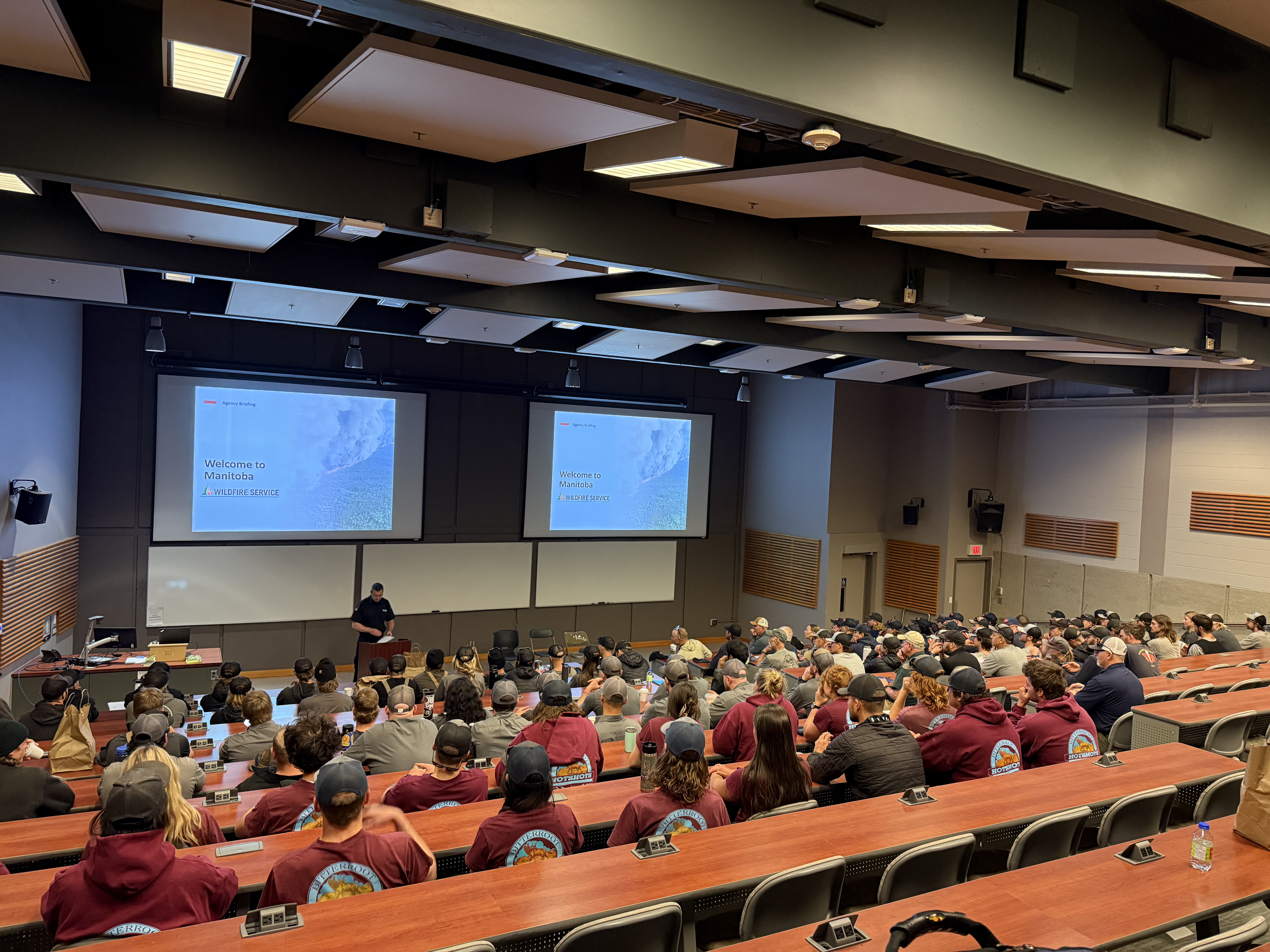
American firefighters attend a session preparing for operations in Manitoba.

=== Manitoba ===
Flags at the Manitoba Legislative Building were lowered to half-mast to pay respect to the two people killed by the fire in Lac du Bonnet. Premier Kinew vowed to review the government's response to the wildfire season once it ended.

=== National ===
On May 29, CIFFC raised the National Preparedness Level to 5, its highest level, indicating full mobilization of national firefighting resources and continuing high to extreme fire activity.

Demand for water bombers increased during firefighting operations, though provinces are not expected to receive new planes for several years. Canada has no national water bomber fleet or firefighting service—instead, the provinces have mutual sharing agreements—though the Canadian Association of Fire Chiefs has offered a proposal to create one within weeks.

The House of Commons held an emergency debate on June 3, which was request by the New Democratic Party to request more resources for indigenous people in Saskatchewan and Manitoba. Randy Hoback, a Conservative member of parliament (MP) in Saskatchewan, offered to share his riding office with Buckley Belanger, a Liberal MP who had been elected in the 2025 election but could not set up an office because of the fires. Senator David Arnot gave a speech on June 10 requesting the creation of a national emergency response agency, equivalent to Federal Emergency Management Agency (FEMA) in the United States or National Emergency Management Agency (NEMA) in Australia.

The federal government announced in August $46 million for wildfire research funding across 30 research projects.

=== International ===
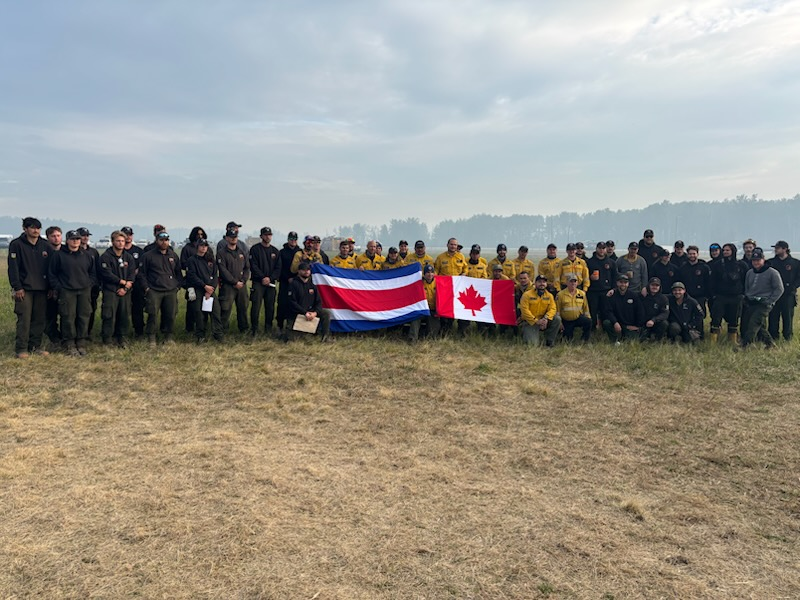
Firefighters in Alberta holding Costa Rican and Canadian flags.

World Central Kitchen dispatched a relief team to Winnipeg on May 31.

Hundreds of international firefighters were deployed to combat wildfires. On May 30, firefighters from Oregon and Idaho deployed to Alberta to aid in battling wildfires there. The United States Department of Agriculture announced on May 31 it was mobilizing over 150 firefighters and support personnel and sending a water bomber as well as firefighting equipment. Australia sent 96 personnel for five weeks on June 10. New Zealand sent a crew of seven specialists in early July and Minister of Internal Affairs Brooke van Velden stated a larger task force would likely follow. Costa Rica sent a contingent to Alberta in June. Firefighters and specialists from Mexico and Australia were scheduled to arrive in Thompson, Manitoba in mid-July. The United States Forest Service deployed about 700 firefighters to Canada by mid-August, but those were later redeployed within the US to deal with their own wildfires.

The 51st G7 summit took place in Kananaskis, Alberta on June 16–17. Leaders at the summit agreed to the Kananaskis Wildfire Charter, pledging co-operation on wildfire management, prevention, research collaboration, and other aspects between the G7 members as well as Australia, India, Mexico, South Korea, and South Africa. The agreement was noted for not mentioning climate change, possibly to placate U.S. President Donald Trump, who had recently moved to dismantle American efforts to address climate change.

Six Republican members of the American House of Representatives wrote a letter to Canadian ambassador Kirsten Hillman complaining about the smoke ruining their constituents' summer and blamed Canadian authorities for "a lack of active forest management". The letter was widely denounced in Canada, with Manitoba premier Wab Kinew calling the lawmakers "ambulance chasers". Other Republican lawmakers varyingly condemned the Canadian government responses to wildfires, sent a letter to prime minister Mark Carney, and filed a formal complaint with the U.S. Environmental Protection Agency (EPA). Kinew criticized the lawmakers as "attention-seeking" and stated gratitude for American firefighters. The exchanges came amid tensions from the concurrent trade war. The complaints were noted by wildfire experts and some American Democrats for not mentioning climate change—the key driver of the fires' severity—and that the sheer scale of the heat waves and fires precluded a solution of simply extinguishing them.

== Impacts ==
=== Air quality ===
Smoke from the prairie wildfires travels from Canada to Europe, May 22 to June 2.

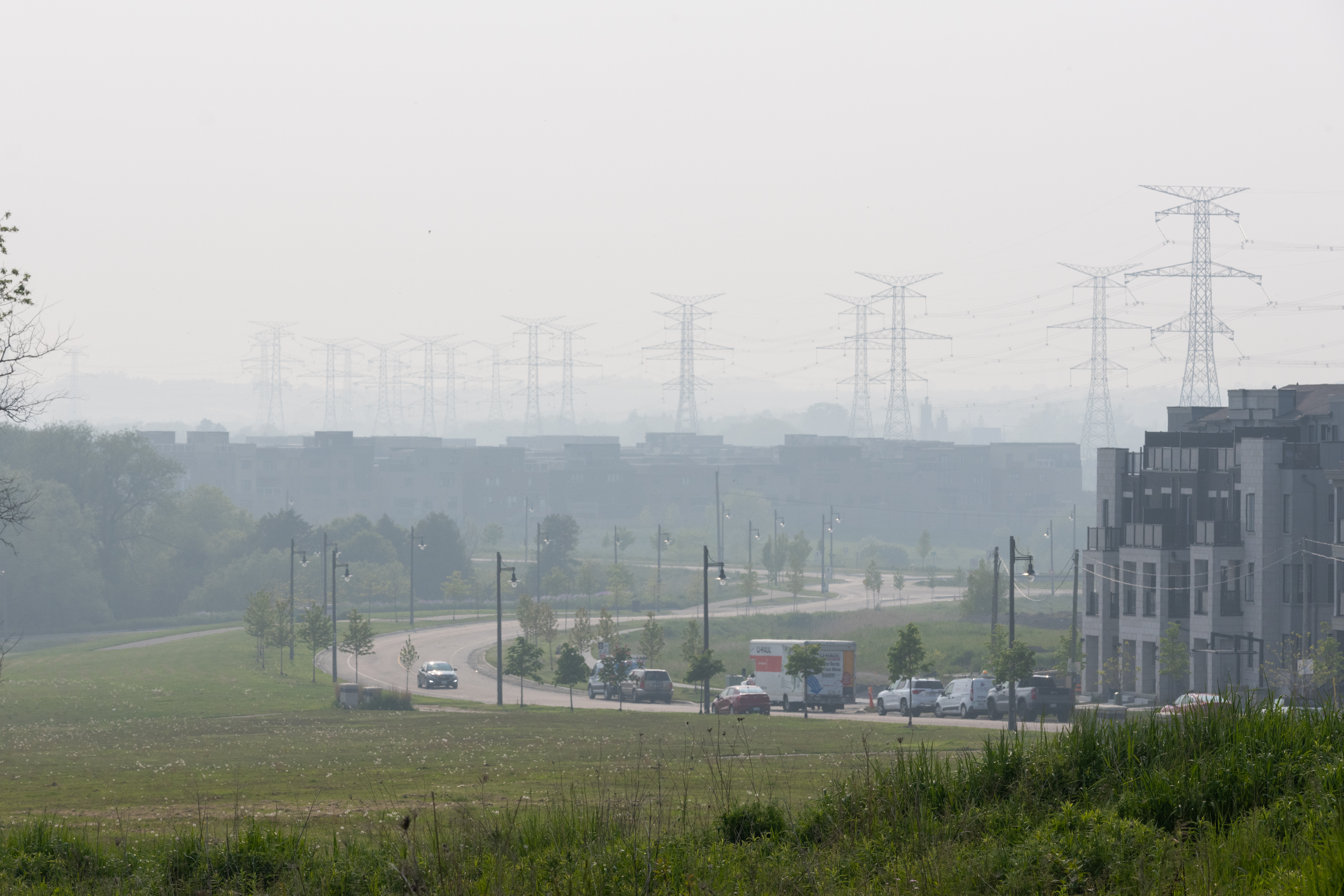
Wildfire smoke from Western Canada causing hazy skies over Clarington, on June 6 2025.

Environment and Climate Change Canada began issuing air quality warnings for Saskatchewan and Manitoba in mid-May. The first plumes of smoked from the fires reached Europe on May 18 at an altitude of 9,000 m (30,000 ft). As fires grew and intensified, smoke in early June caused severe air quality issues in northwestern Ontario, forcing closures and people indoors in Thunder Bay and throughout the region. Smoke drifted eastwards resulting in air quality warnings across Canada on June 5 and 6, including in the Ottawa–Gatineau region, Greater Toronto Area, and Montreal. At times during that span, Toronto and Montreal respectively had the second- and third-worst air quality in the world according to IQAir. One-third of the US was impacted by the smoke with areas suffering from poor air quality. Fires in northern Alberta and British Columbia covered Calgary and Edmonton in smoke, leading to an Air Quality Health Index of 10+ for the latter.

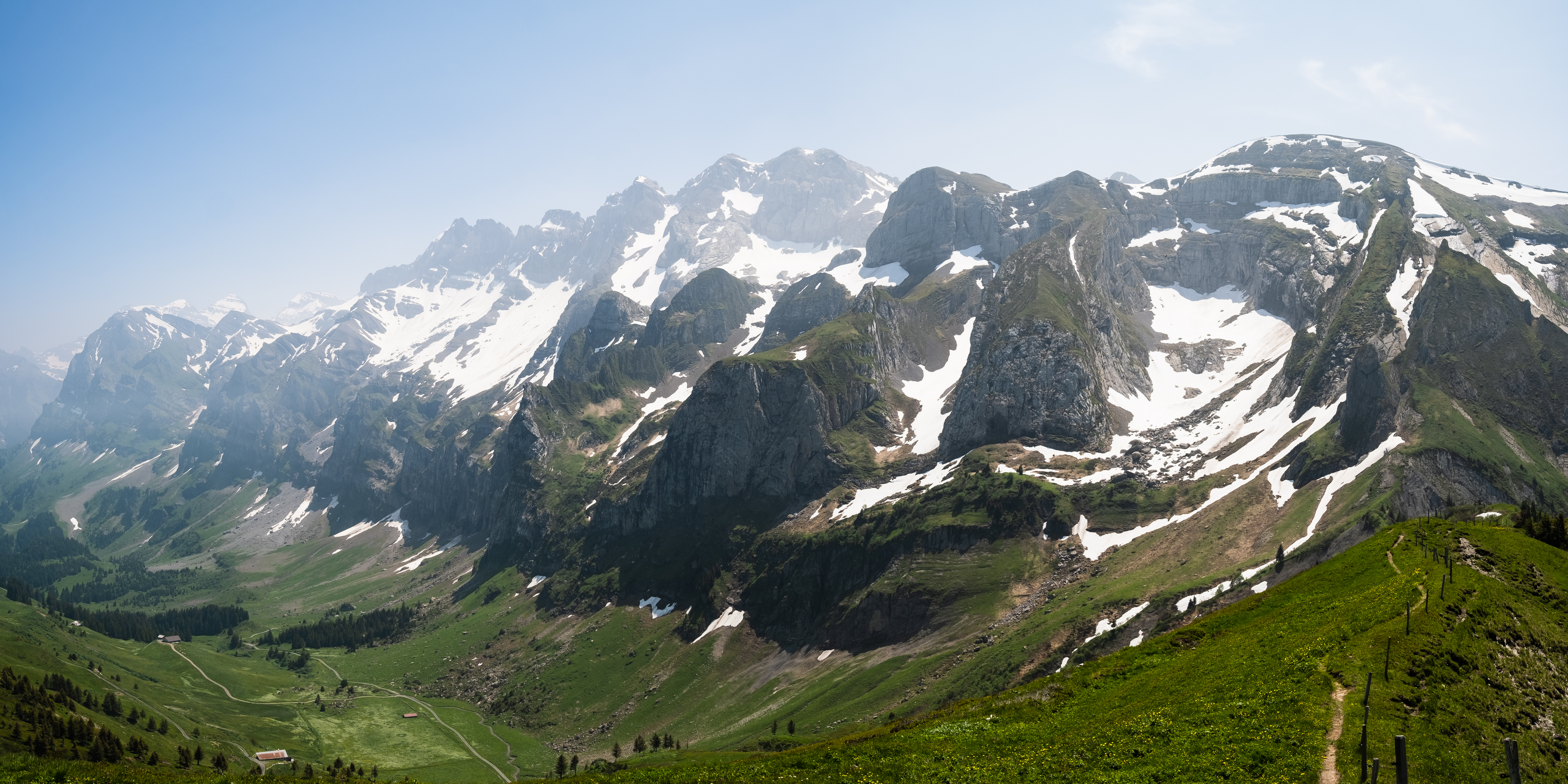
Wildfire smoke obscures the landscape of the Dents Blanches, in Switzerland, on June 9.

Smoke caused hazy skies and orange-red sunsets in the US and Europe. American cities from Kansas City to Minneapolis faced hazardous air quality and a network of pediatric clinics in the Twin Cities noted an increase in patients with respiratory problems. The American health services response was hampered by mass layoffs in the public service as health specialists and experts on wildfire smoke at the National Institute for Occupational Safety and Health (NIOSH) were on administrative leave, including the entirety of the National Center for Environmental Health. The layoffs also prevented a report on protecting outdoor workers from smoke being finalized as none of the workers remaining after the purges were qualified to finish it.

A second wave of intense fires in July led to more smoke-filled skies. Poor air quality in Regina, Saskatchewan caused the postponement of the Canadian Football League game between the Calgary Stampeders and the Saskatchewan Roughriders on July 11. Smoke in Winnipeg was severe and also caused event cancellations; spending 24 hours outside was the equivalent of smoking three cigarettes. Winds pushed the smoke eastwards, leading to poor conditions for much of Central Canada. Much of the American Upper Midwest also faced unhealthy levels of smoke. Toronto again had some of the worst air quality in the world on July 14, and over 20 air quality statements were in effect in Northwestern Ontario.

Authorities in Nunavut advised residents to be aware of signs of local hazardous air quality. Wildfire smoke, which is normally rare in the Arctic, set records in the territory. The hamlet of Baker Lake experienced smoke cover for three consecutive years for the first time in its history; Iqaluit set a record of 19 hours of smoke cover and Rankin Inlet saw 71 hours, behind only its 2023 season.

Intense fires in August led to more air quality warnings throughout Canada. The most severely polluted air was in northern Ontario, Manitoba, and Saskatchewan. Toronto again ranked as one of the most-polluted major cities in the world. About 81 million Americans across 14 states were placed under air quality alerts because of the smoke. Yellowknife cancelled its Half-Ironman distance event because of hazardous air quality. Fires in the north in late summer led to more air quality warnings for Alberta and western Saskatchewan.

==== Health ====
Wildfire smoke creates high levels of ozone and particulate matter such as PM_{2.5}, which can cause respiratory issues and increase the risk of cardiac arrest. Many areas where wildfires have burned are home to former mining operations, which has left high concentrations of toxins such as arsenic, lead, and mercury that are then released into the air. Peat fires in particular can accumulate these toxins.

The Ontario Federation of Labour announced in August 2025 that it would push for more robust worker protections because of health concerns over air quality.

=== Economic and fiscal ===
Crude oil operations were shut down temporarily in May because of fires. A Statistics Canada analysis found that by June 10, wildfires had spread to or caused evacuations in regions representing 0.125% of the country's gross domestic product (GDP). The risk was distributed unevenly and was highest in Manitoba, where 2.4% of GDP was at risk, followed by Saskatchewan at 0.4% and Alberta at 0.2%; in northern Manitoba and northern Saskatchewan, approximately 26.3% and 24.4% of their respective regional economies were at risk.

As of early September, insurance losses from wildfires in Manitoba and Saskatchewan were approaching $300 million, $249 million of which was attributed to the wildfire complex surrounding Flin Flon. The Pisew wildfire was responsible for $50 million in damage. The Kingston fire in Newfoundland caused $70 million in insured losses in August. The government of Manitoba signed a $30 million contract with the Canadian Red Cross for support services related to wildfires, worth more than half of the province's total annual budget for emergency services.

Premier Kinew stated on September 25 that the wildfires cost the government of Manitoba $180 million with more costs expected, exceeding the $30 million budget initially set aside for all emergencies for the year in the province. An analysis by The Narwhal and the Winnipeg Free Press estimated that the Manitoba fires cost over $500 million in direct expenses including insured damages, evacuations, emergency costs, healthcare, and other costs.

=== Environmental ===
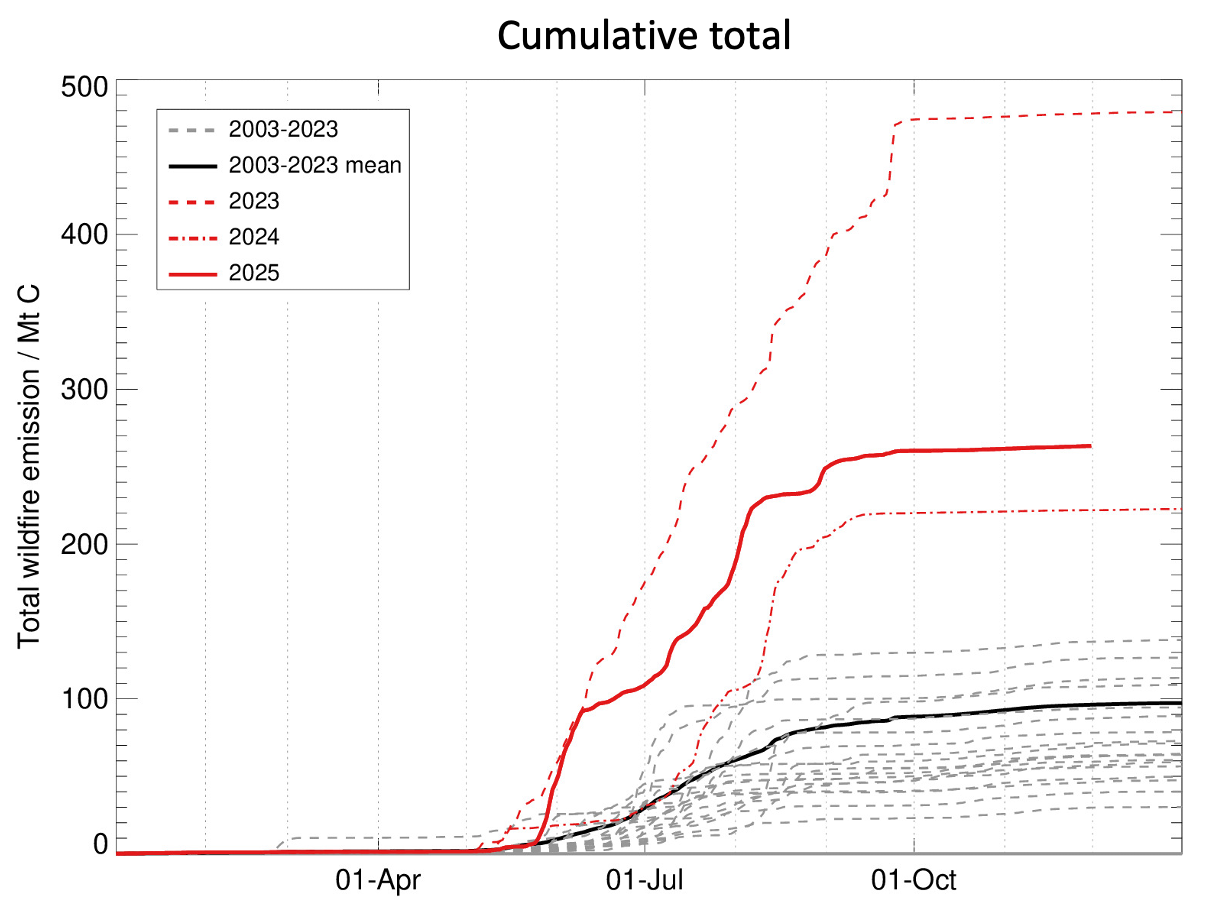
Cumulative daily carbon emissions in 2025 compared to previous years.

With climate change creating hot and dry conditions, the start of the wildfire season was intense compared to historical records, with the area burned and number of fires approaching that of the 2023 season. By June 10, the fires had burned 3.2 million ha (7.9 million acres) and already surpassed the annual average of 2.95 million ha (7.3 million acres). In mid-June, the fires were on track to be the second-worst in recorded history by area burned; in early August, having burned over 7.2 million ha (18 million acres)—an area roughly the size of New Brunswick—the 2025 season reached the milestone. Over half of the total burned area was in Saskatchewan and Manitoba, while Alberta, British Columbia, and Ontario also experienced fires above annual averages.

The fires of 2023, 2024, and 2025 were all in the worst ten years on federal record, which goes back to 1972. According to the Copernicus Atmosphere Monitoring Service (CAMS), by June 2 the fires had emitted 56 megatonnes of carbon dioxide. By the end of November, CAMS estimated the fires had emitted 263 megatonnes, second only to 2023.

=== First Nations ===
The wildfires disproportionately impacted Canada's First Nations, with over half of the 40,000 evacuees estimated in mid-June coming from these communities. The communities frequently have poor road connections to the rest of the country and evacuations were complicated by smoke limiting visibility for evacuation flights. Evacuees also sometimes faced anti-Indigenous racism in the cities where they sheltered. By mid-August, 165 emergency events had affected 134 First Nations and led to 88 evacuations, with one in every seven seeing an evacuation since April 1. A federal government update on October 30, 2025 stated that of the country's approximately 85,000 evacuees, 45,000 were evacuated from 73 First nations communities.

== See also ==
- 2025 United States wildfires
- List of wildfires
- List of fires in Canada
- Wildfires in 2025
