= 2024 Canadian wildfires =

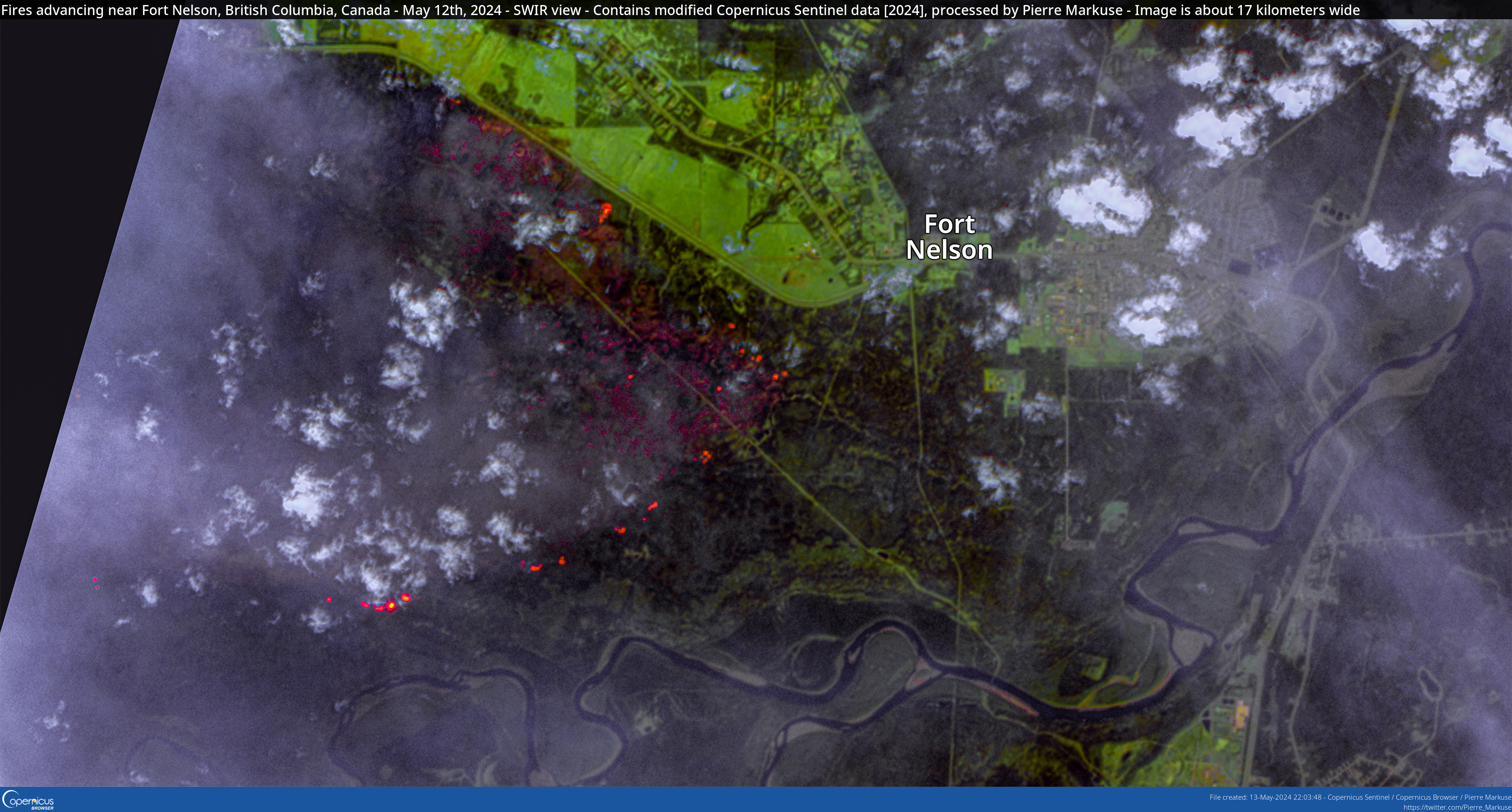
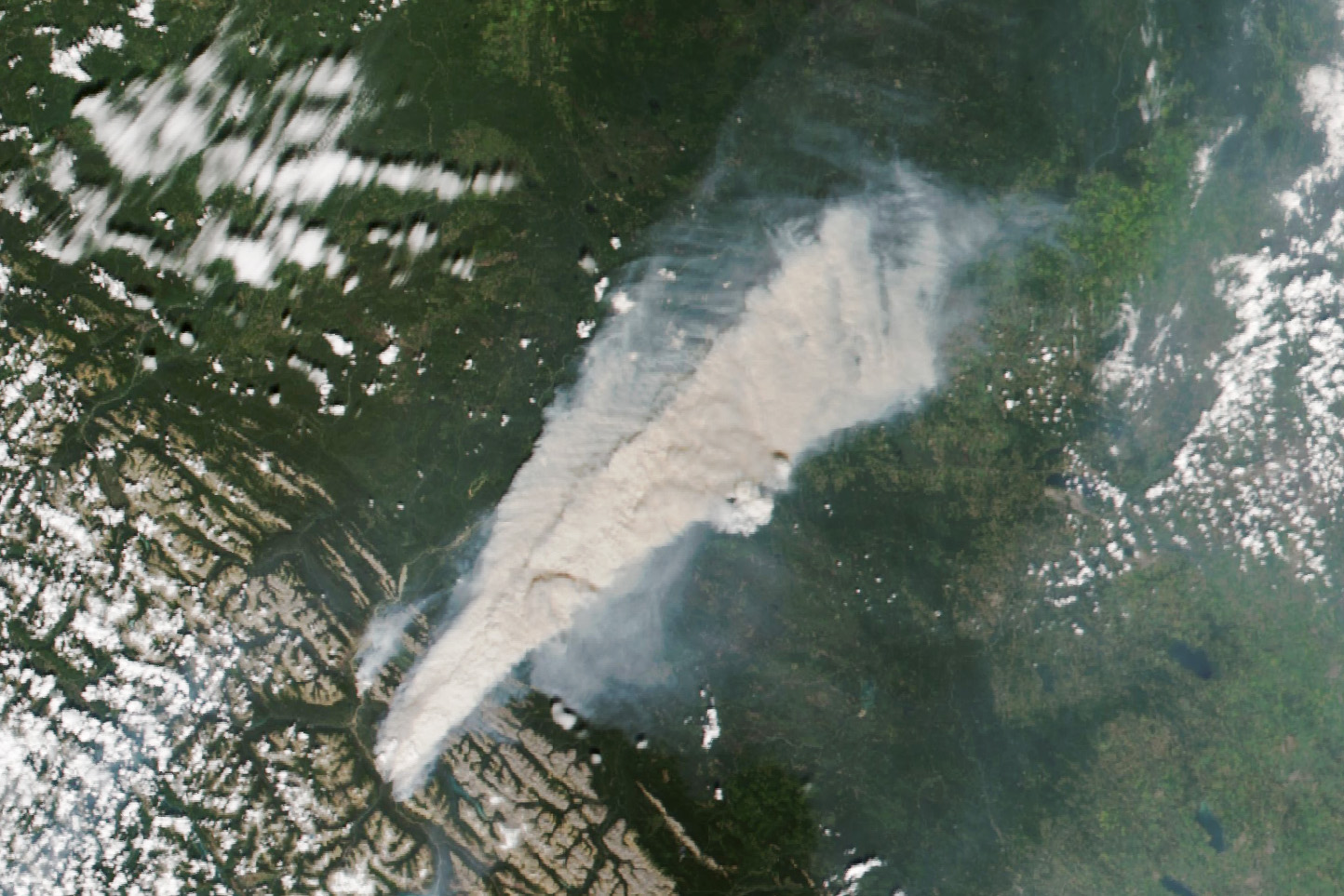
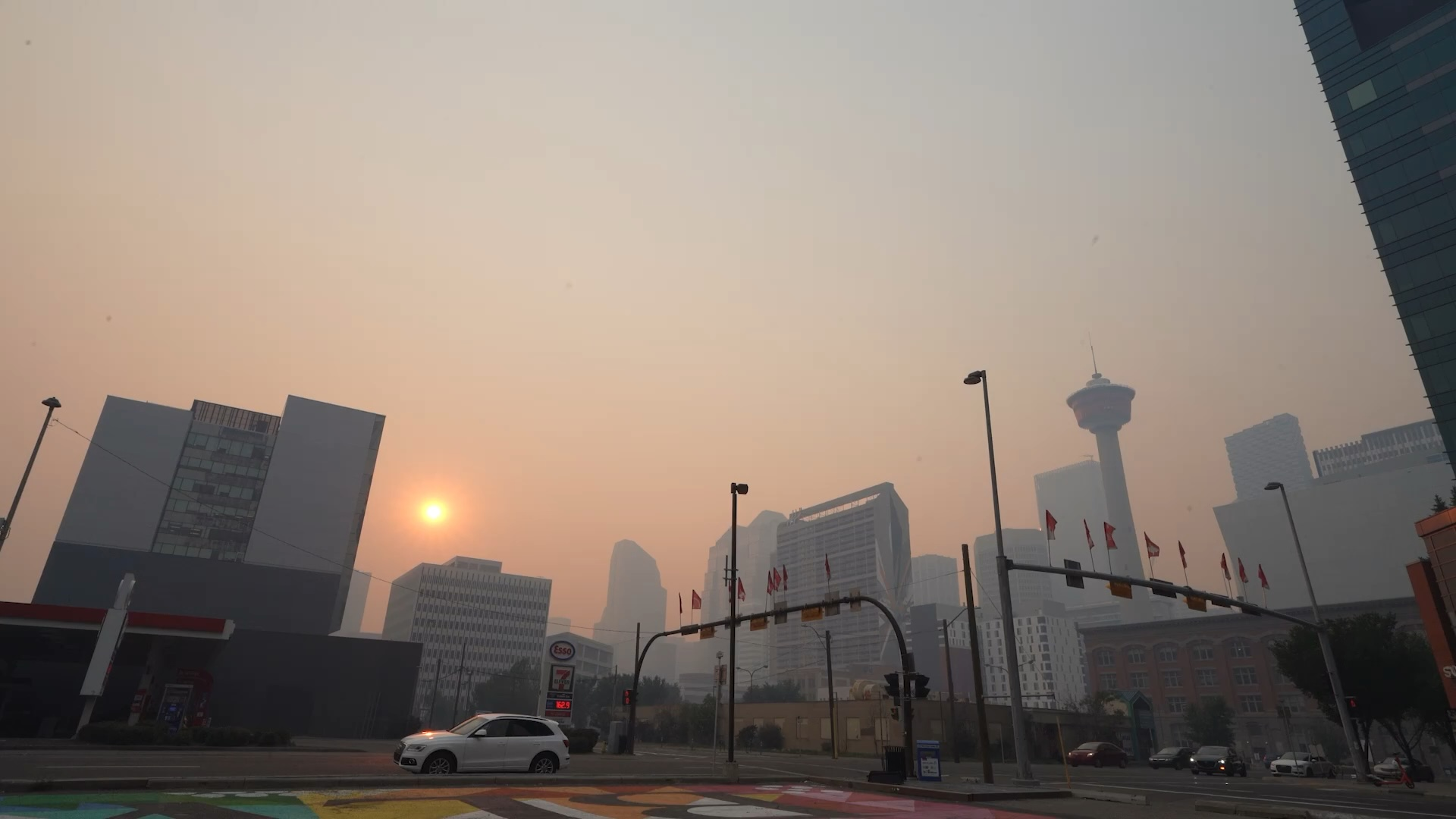
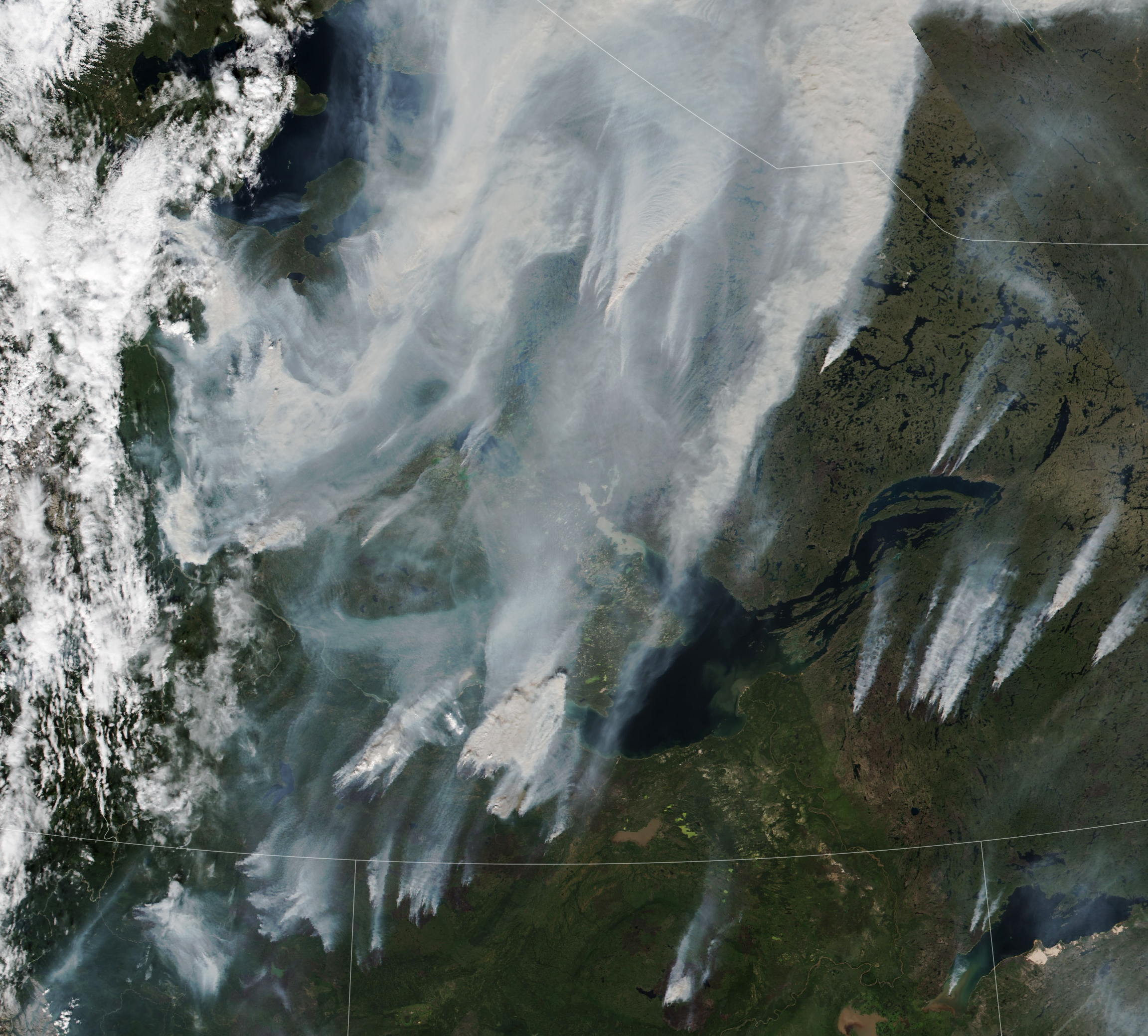
- Top-to-bottom, left-to-right: Fires approach Fort Nelson, British Columbia; A plume of smoke from Jasper, Alberta; Wildfire smoke in Calgary; Smoke from fires in the Northwest Territories; Timelapse of black carbon caused by wildfire smoke
- Date: February—November 2024
- Location: Alberta; British Columbia; Saskatchewan; Manitoba; Newfoundland and Labrador; Northwest Territories

Statistics
- Total fires: 5,686 (as of November 20, 2024)
- Total area: 5.378 million ha (13.29 million acres) (as of November 20, 2024)

Impacts
- Deaths: (Direct) 1 firefighter (Indirect) 1 helicopter pilot
- Evacuated: 50,000+
- Structures destroyed: 396

Map
- Perimeters of 2024 Canadian wildfires - season to date (map data)

The 2024 wildfires in Canada began as an extension of the record-setting 2023 wildfires. The country experienced an unusually long fire season in 2023 that lasted into the autumn; these fires smouldered through the winter and about 150 re-ignited as early as February 2024. By early May, large wildfires had broken out in Alberta, British Columbia, and Manitoba. Soon after, there were significant fires in Saskatchewan, the Northwest Territories, and Newfoundland and Labrador.

The fires forced the evacuation of tens of thousands of people in communities throughout the country, including over 7,000 from Labrador City (the largest-ever evacuation in Newfoundland and Labrador's history) and 25,000 in Jasper, Alberta. The Jasper wildfire destroyed one-third of the town's structures and was one of the most expensive natural disasters in Canadian history. Smoke from fires reduced air quality through the United States and Canada and reached as far as Mexico and Europe. There were two fatalities reported related to the fires: a firefighter killed by a falling tree in Alberta, and a helicopter pilot in the Northwest Territories who crashed while assisting with wildfire management.

The year saw the second-highest wildfire carbon emissions since the Copernicus Atmosphere Monitoring Service measurements began in 2003, behind only the historically destructive 2023 season. By total area burned—over 5.3 million hectares (13 million acres)—it was one of the six worst years in the preceding 50. Approximately 70% of the land burned was in Alberta, British Columbia, Saskatchewan, and the Northwest Territories.

== Background ==
The 2023 wildfires were the most destructive in recorded Canadian history. Increased temperatures due to climate change had dried out vast quantities of vegetation, fueling blazes that lasted until the late autumn. Many of these fires did not extinguish fully, but rather smouldered as overwintering fires (also called "zombie fires"). Droughts, combined with longer and hotter summers, dry out organic material in soils and make these types of fires more common in the country's boreal forests.

There were approximately 200 overwintering fires in Western Canada. Because of how deep the fires ran, they were difficult to detect and extinguish, especially with snow obscuring the thermal signature. Northeast British Columbia experienced extensive drought and had a very dry winter with low snowpack, and locals in Fort Nelson began discovering fires as early as December 2023. Smoke could be seen rising from underground fires despite temperatures of approximately −40 °C (−40 °F). In February 2024, thermal satellite imaging revealed dozens of fires in Alberta and British Columbia, which had likely been smouldering in peat. By February 20, 2024, there were 92 active fires in British Columbia and 54 in Alberta.

== Wildfires ==
=== Alberta ===
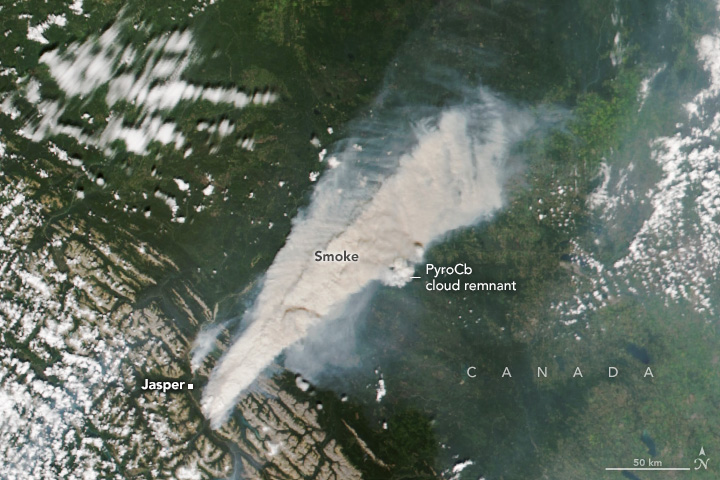
A large plume of smoke emanates near Jasper on July 23. The remnants of a pyrocumulonimbus cloud are visible.

Fire bans began in Alberta on February 20. Beginning in mid-May, wildfires began to encroach on Fort McMurray, which had been devastated by fire in 2016. On the evening of May 10, the wildfire designated MWF017 was 16 km southeast of Fort McMurray and the Regional Municipality of Wood Buffalo had issued an evacuation alert. The County of Grande Prairie also ordered an evacuation because of a wildfire near Teepee Creek, and about 100 Canadian Forces soldiers were deployed to the region. Concurrently, smoke from fires in British Columbia caused severe air quality issues in Edmonton.

By May 15, four neighbourhoods in Fort McMurray (Beacon Hill, Abasand, Prairie Creek and Grayling Terrace) were ordered to evacuate, displacing 6,000 and causing gridlock on Alberta Highway 63. Because local vegetation was still regrowing from the 2016 fire, the fires spread more slowly compared to eight years before. The evacuation orders for Fort McMurray were ended on May 18 after a combination of firefighting and favourable weather.

Fires grew through the summer, and on July 20, there were 158 wildfires recorded with 55 reported to be out of control. The Northern Alberta communities of John D'Or Prairie 215, Fox Lake and Garden River were evacuated, covering about 5,000 people. An out-of-control fire began approaching Jasper from the south and on July 22 the townsite was evacuated, forcing 25,000 to flee. The fire eventually consumed over 32,000 hectares and destroyed 358 of Jasper's 1,113 structures. Smoke from the fire combined with that from Park Fire in California and reduced air quality as far as New England and Mexico

The Jasper fire continued to grow through August along its southern border. A 24-year-old firefighter was killed northeast of Jasper on August 3 after being struck by a falling tree. Residents were allowed to return on a temporary basis on August 16, but many of the remaining structures suffered significant damage from heat, smoke, and water, and powerful fires continued to burn to the south. After almost four weeks, the Jasper fire was declared held on August 17, and brought under control September 7. The fires were expected to burn until early winter.

The estimated carbon emissions for July 2024 were the most of any July dating back to 2003, when the Copernicus Atmosphere Monitoring Service began collecting data. When the fire season officially ended on October 31, the province had seen 775,000 hectares burned, compared to 2.2 million in 2023. The Jasper fire topped the list of Canada's 10 most impactful weather stories of 2024.

=== British Columbia ===
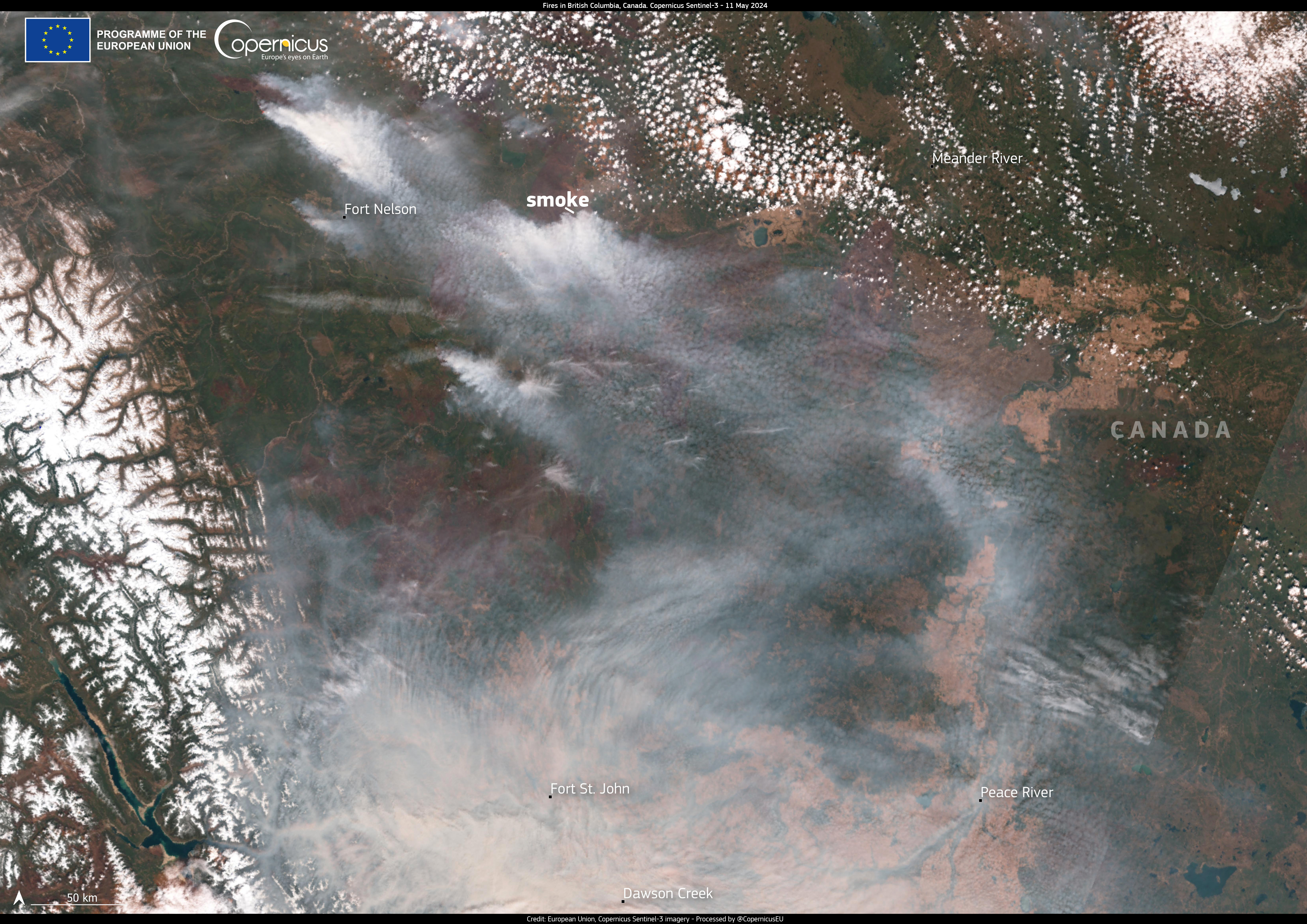
Fires approaching Fort Nelson on May 11.

The town of Fort Nelson and the Fort Nelson First Nation were forced to evacuate on May 10 because of the Parker Lake wildfire to the west of the region. Highways 77 and 97 were closed because of the fires. Over 4,500 people were displaced; they were able to return on May 27. Ten properties and four homes in Fort Nelson were destroyed. The First Nation did not lose any structures, but culturally significant areas near Snake River were damaged. The Patry Creek fire to the north was burning out of control by July 23, covering 775 square kilometres (299 mi^{2}) and limiting access to Highway 77. On July 24, the Dogtooth Forest Service Road fire destroyed 15 structures, including four homes in Golden.

More fires began developing in the summer in the southeast and central interior, with hundreds spawning by mid-July. Parts of the Thompson-Nicola Regional District, Central Kootenay Regional District, and Cook's Ferry Indian Band territory were ordered to evacuate. Several hundred people were displaced, including a 60-person Hare Krishna community in Venables Valley and the 380-person village of Slocan. On July 22, lightning struck over 20,000 times in the province, mostly in the northern regions, and sparked over 70 new fires. The Antler Creek fire in the Cariboo Region grew rapidly overnight on July 22, forcing the evacuations of about 300 residents and 700 tourists from Wells, Barkerville, Bowron Lake, and nearby areas. On July 23, the province had deployed 977 firefighters and 178 aviation crews. The fire covered 14,300 hectares, but on July 26 the evacuation order was lifted.

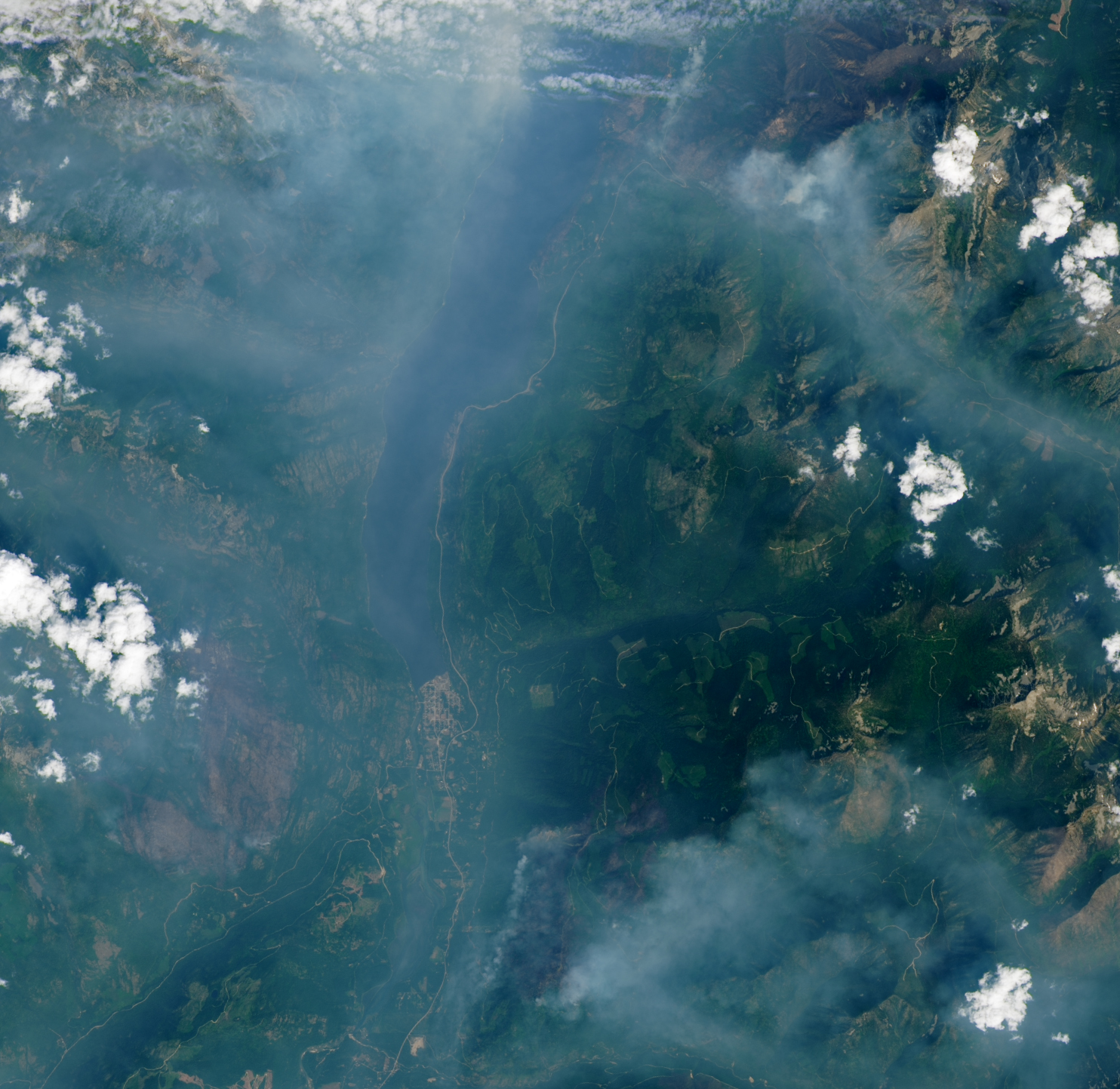
Wildfire smoke fills the Slocan Valley on July 27. The village of Slocan, visible at the bottom of the lake, was evacuated.

A 230 hectare fire spawned on Vancouver Island on July 22, 5 km south of Sooke Lake. The fire was held, but required 70 firefighters and three helicopters and forced the precautionary closure of nearby Sooke Potholes Regional Park.

On July 28, BC Wildfire Services reported 372 fires, classifying 177 as out of control. In early August, more out of control fires forced the evacuation of about 100 properties in the Southern Interior, including areas north of the village Lytton, which was destroyed in a 2021 wildfire.

Out-of-control fires continued in September in the province's interior, triggering air quality alerts for communities including Prince George and Quesnel. Fourteen properties in Baynes Lake in the southeast were evacuated on September 9. There was a brief evacuation of about 150 homes outside Grand Forks on September 25 due to a fire in bordering Washington. On September 29, an out-of-control fire near Christina Lake similarly forced the evacuation of 42 homes and about 84 for several hours.

=== Manitoba ===
Manitoba saw 266,000 hectares of forest burned in 2024, about 60,000 hectares more than 2023. The first wildfire was detected on April 8, compared to April 30 in 2023. Of the 291 fires recorded through the season, 105 were human-caused and 206 needed a full firefighting response.

The first significant fires occurred in May. On May 11, fires in the northwest forced the evacuations of Cranberry Portage (a community of about 650 people), several nearby cottage subdivisions, and Bakers Narrows Provincial Park. Likely sparked by lightning and fueled by high winds and dry conditions, the fires spread to 37,000 hectares and destroyed two residences, five cottages, and two garages before being brought under control. Residents were able to return on May 19.

In July, fires erupted in the northeast, south of Gods Lake. Smoke severely degraded the regional air quality and airplanes carrying supplies for the remote communities were unable to land safely. By July 31, the fires spread to 24,320 hectares and the smoke forced the evacuation of several First Nations communities, affecting about 250 people from Manto Sipi Cree Nation, Wasagamack, Red Sucker Lake and Gods Lake First Nations. The fire grew to 30,000 hectares by August 2, increasing the number of evacuees to over 1,000 and forcing Red Sucker Lake to declare a state of emergency because of power outages and relentless smoke.

A fire first detected on August 4 grew out of control and on August 13 forced evacuations at Bunibonibee, Nisichawayasihk, and Tataskweyak Cree Nations. The fire had reached 10 kilometres (6.2 mi) south of the community and about 2,500 residents were evacuated via Hercules military aircraft to Winnipeg and Brandon—about 600 kilometres (370 mi) away—with many staying at the recreational complex at the University of Winnipeg or at hotels. The fire was declared held on August 29 and the evacuation order lifted, though there were still concerns over high levels of smoke.

As of October 1, three large fires were still out of control.

=== Newfoundland and Labrador ===
Dry conditions and lightning strikes caused several fires in Labrador. By June 14, there were seven major fires with six out of control. Churchill Falls, the company town that operates the second-largest hydroelectric dam in Canada (Churchill Falls Generating Station), was evacuated on June 19. The power plant continued to operate with a skeleton staff, until they were forced to evacuate on June 25 after a fire jumped the Churchill River. The evacuation was lifted on July 3.

Over 7,000 residents were forced to evacuate Labrador City on July 12 after a fire rapidly grew from 400 to 14,000 hectares and advanced towards the city. It was the province's largest ever evacuation. The city is home to the Labrador West Health Centre, and over 200 health care workers and their patients were evacuated to Happy Valley-Goose Bay—along with the rest of the city—putting significant strain on the local health care system.

=== Northwest Territories ===
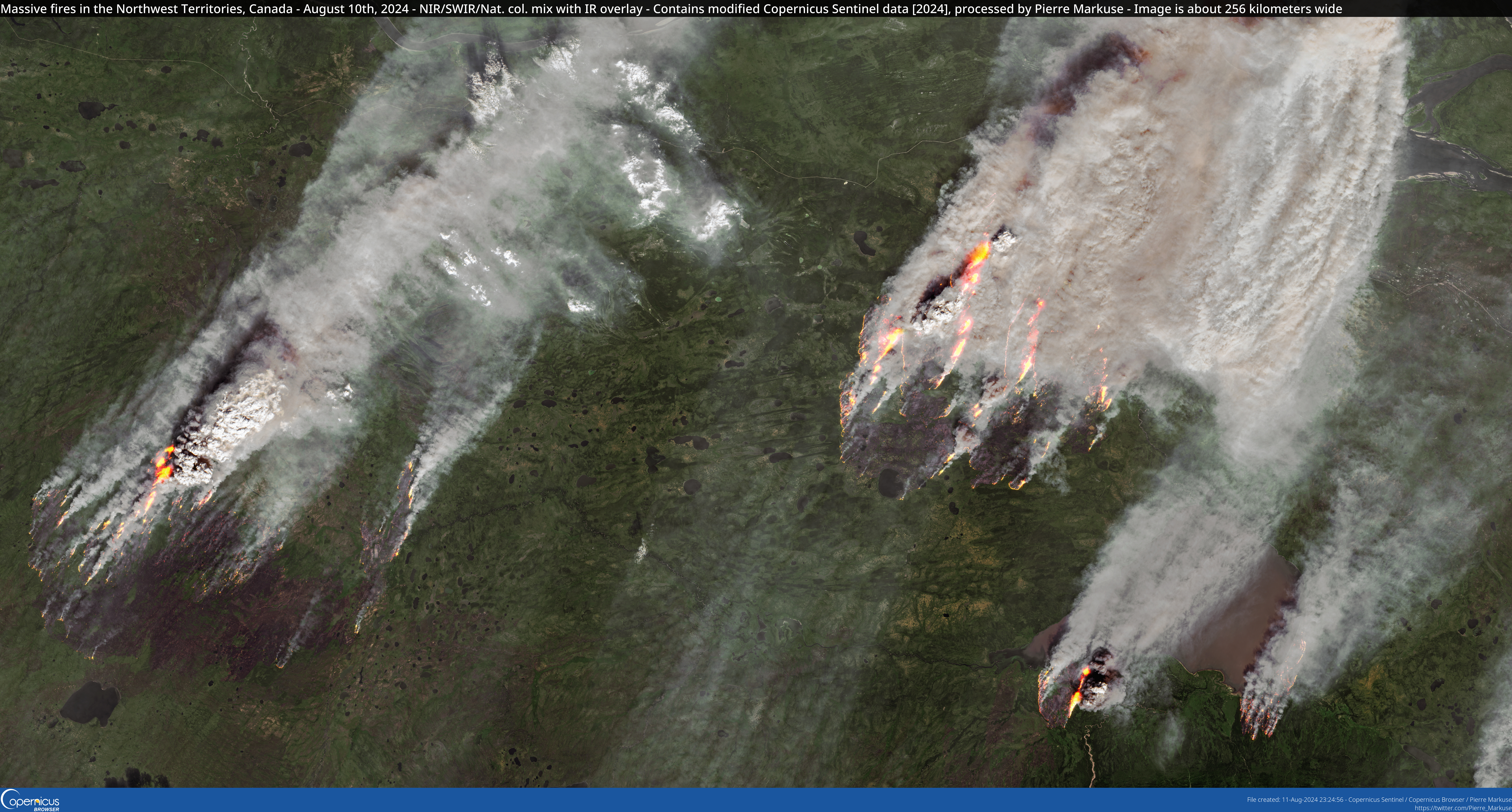
Satellite image from August 10 showing fires blanketing the Northwest Territories in smoke. Highway 1 and the Mackenzie River are visible at the top.

In mid-June, a wildfire forced the evacuation of Fort Good Hope, an isolated community of about 500. It is suspected that strong winds fed an abandoned campfire, which grew to 8,200 hectares before it was brought under control. Residents were able to return on July 6. Although no buildings or infrastructure were destroyed, a helicopter pilot who was assisting with wildfire management died when his aircraft crashed.

The territory saw all-time record-high temperatures in August, with parts of the Arctic Circle reaching 36 °C (97 °F). Fires continued through the month and increased in severity, covering most of the territory in a layer of thick smoke and putting much of it under "extreme fire danger." The smoke turned the skies orange and reduced visibility significantly, forcing the closure of portions of Highway 1. In some areas, fires burned over 100,000 hectares of land per day; between August 10–11 alone, there were 313,000 hectares burned, which is approximately 60% of a typical year's fires. By the end of October, fires had burned 1.7 million ha (4.2 million acres).

=== Saskatchewan ===
Compared to the five-year average, Saskatchewan experienced more wildfires than expected, and fires were threatening power and telecommunications infrastructure in early July. Smoke from fires in the west began causing air quality advisories in most of the province. On August 14, Sandy Bay—a village of 1,800—was evacuated because an encroaching out-of-control fire from the northwest had reached within 20 km. Leaders of the Peter Ballantyne Cree Nation and the Prince Albert Grand Council criticized the Saskatchewan Public Safety Agency for refusing to deploy First Nations firefighters to contain the fire in time. About 200 people from Sandy Bay stayed behind to fight the fires; the evacuation order was lifted September 9.

== Impacts ==
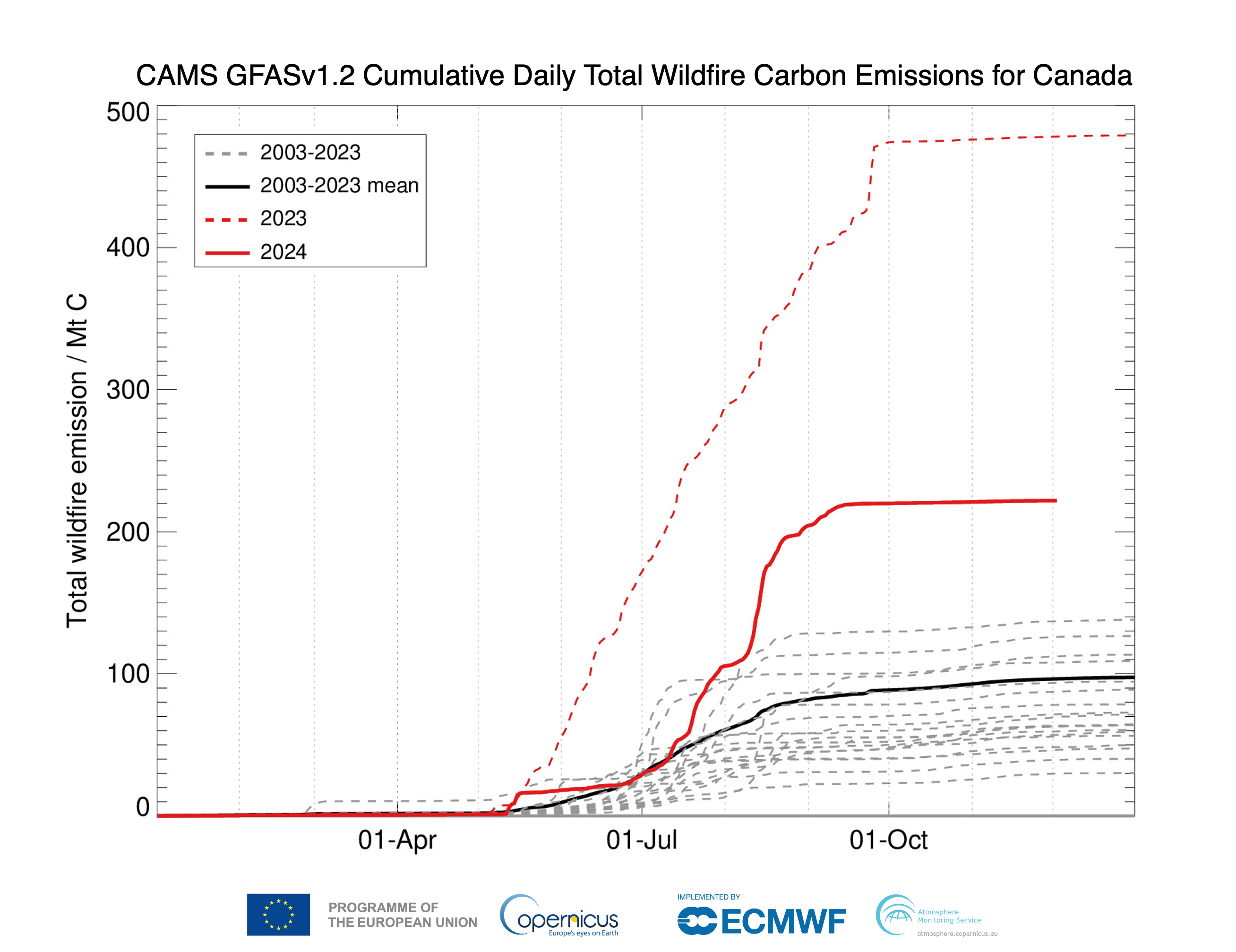
Cumulative carbon emissions from wildfires dating to 2003. Well above typical years, the 2024 fires trailed only the 2023 fires in their emissions.

By mid-August, the fires had burned over 3.4 million hectares of land, and over 700 international firefighters had joined the efforts to extinguish them. Twenty-one First Nations communities had been evacuated, and 74 have been impacted.

=== Economic ===
The Jasper fire is estimated to have cost insurance companies over $880 million, making it the ninth-most expensive disaster for insurance companies in Canadian history. The federal and provincial governments announced on August 1 that they would spend $57 million on new firefighting equipment over five years.

=== Environmental ===
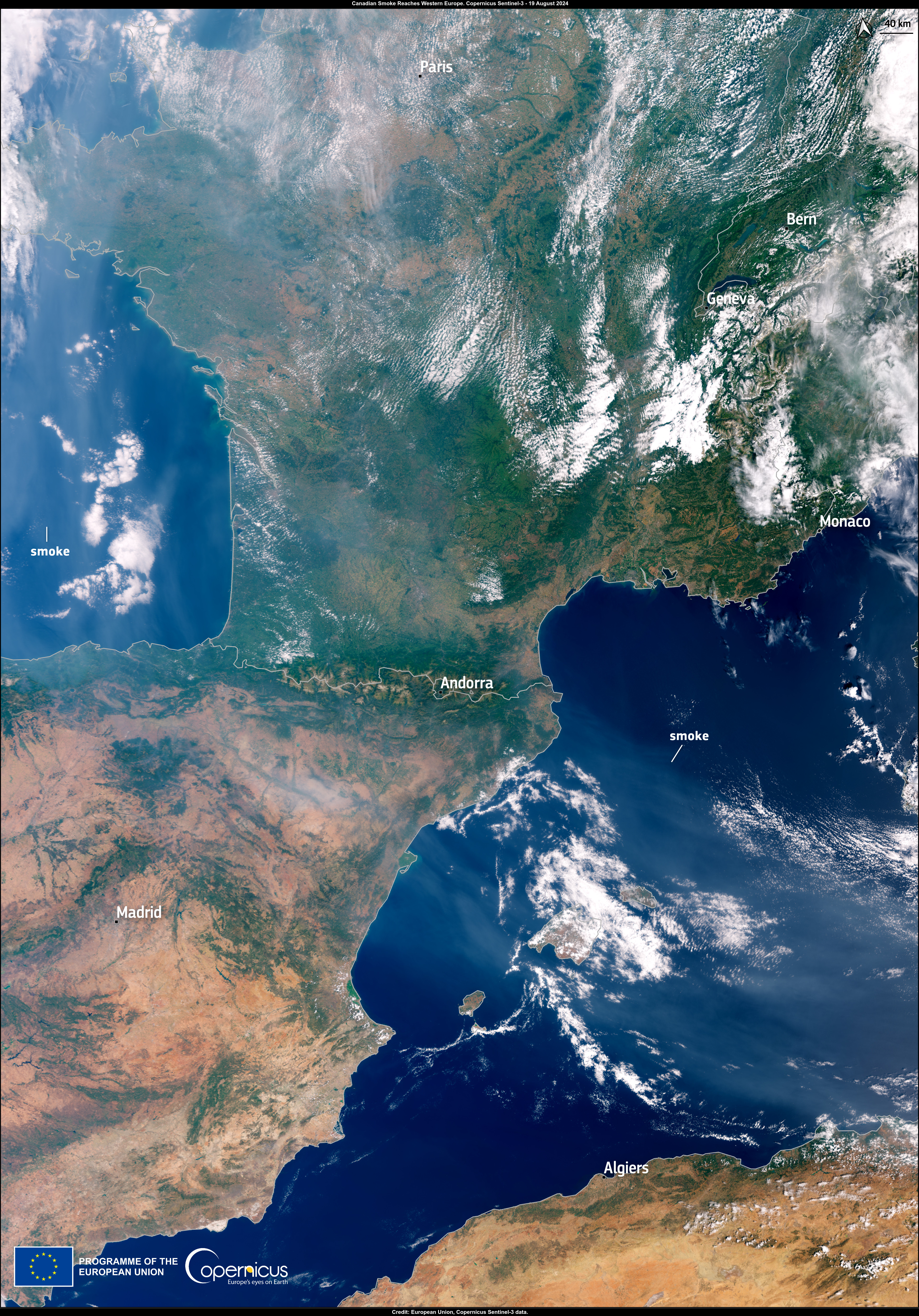
Satellite images show smoke from Canadian wildfires over Western Europe on August 17, 2024.

Emissions from the fires are expected to exceed those of every year since tracking began in 2003, except for the historically bad 2023 season. Soot and ash from Jasper landed on the Athabasca Glacier, allowing the glacier to absorb more sunlight. Combined with rising temperatures from climate change, the deposits have put the glacier into what hydrologist John Pomeroy described as a "death spiral".

Massive plumes of smoke from the fires in mid-July formed trails spanning thousands of kilometres away across Canada and the mid-western United States, reducing air quality. As fires continued through August, they reduced air quality and caused hazy skies in almost all of Canada, as well bordering states and the Northeastern United States. Smoke in the west plagued the Canadian Prairies, and major cities including Edmonton, Saskatoon, Regina, and Flin Flon reached 10+ (the highest value) on the Air Quality Health Index. The smoke traveled east across the Atlantic Ocean, reaching Western Europe on August 17 and continuing to Scandinavia.

Officials from Natural Resources Canada have stated that wildfires in Canada are now likely to be a year-round rather than seasonal phenomenon. Some fires in Northeast British Columbia have been continuously burning since 2022 and are likely to burn into 2025.

== See also ==
- 2024 United States wildfires
- List of wildfires
- List of fires in Canada
- Wildfires in 2024
