= Canadian Interagency Forest Fire Centre =

The Canadian Interagency Forest Fire Centre, more commonly known by the acronym CIFFC, is a national not-for-profit organization that coordinates mutual aid requests between Canadian and international wildfire suppression agencies. Its role is analogous to that of the National Interagency Fire Center in the United States.

== History ==
Faced with critical resource shortages in the difficult fire seasons of 1979 through 1981, several of Canada's wildfire management agencies began to recognize the need for a coordinated response by their respective governments. CIFFC was founded on June 2, 1982 to formalize the sharing of information, staff, and equipment. It is a not-for-profit corporation owned & operated by the various agencies that make up its membership. Since then, resource exchange standards have been developed by CIFFC and its member agencies to ensure seamless integration of resources from one agency to another while maintaining a safe, effective, and efficient work environment.

== Role ==
CIFFC plays a vital role in wildfire response, preparedness, and mitigation through resource coordination, mutual aid, training, information sharing, and managing the FireSmartTM Canada and ICS Canada programs. CIFFC coordinates mutual aid requests and information sharing between domestic agencies and with international partners. Mutual aid agreements also exist with the United States, Mexico, Australia, New Zealand, South Africa, Costa Rica, Portugal, and Chile.

While CIFFC is funded by its members (along with the federal government), it has no authority over them; its only role is to coordinate. The Canadian Interagency Mutual Aid Resources Sharing (MARS) Agreement provides the concrete formal basis for exchange of equipment, personnel and aircraft between agencies. Similar agreements exist with the United States through the 'Arrangement Between the Department of Agriculture and the Department of the Interior of the United States of America and the Department of Natural Resources Canada Concerning the Exchange of Wildland Fire Management Resources'. The agreements provide for expedited exchange of resources across the international border.

CIFFC sets interagency exchange standards which allow for the smooth mobilization of resources across the country These standards ensure that resources are compatible, functional, and integrate easily into the receiving agency’s system.

== Activities ==
CIFFC’s Fire Coordination Centre is headquartered in Winnipeg, MB. It is the place where resource requests are received and processed. CIFFC Duty Officers are responsible for coordinating these requests.

Resource Requests are reviewed and prioritized daily, based on national resource availability. CIFFC does not determine the types of resources that are mobilized. CIFFC’s role is to coordinate the requested resource from one agency to another. At National Preparedness Level 3 and above, resources are allocated through the Canadian Multi Agency Coordination (CMAC) Group, represented by each of the CIFFC member agencies. The CMAC Group is responsible for triaging and assigning available resources on a consensus basis.

During the fire season, CIFFC hosts regular coordination calls between all agencies to maintain awareness of the evolving resource availability situation. It posts daily situation reports summarizing the national wildfire picture, showing which agencies may be able to respond to requests for assistance, and which likely cannot.

=== Notable deployments ===
- In December 2019, CIFFC deployed 242 fire management personnel to Australia for the first time, reciprocating the efforts of Australian fire crews in Canada in 2017 and 2018.
- In January 2026, CIFFC deployed another 74 personnel to Australia.

== Member agencies ==
- British Columbia: BC Wildfire Service
- Alberta: Alberta Wildfire
- Saskatchewan: Saskatchewan Public Safety Agency
- Manitoba: Manitoba Wildfire Service
- Ontario: Aviation, Forest Fire, and Emergency Services (AFFES)
- Quebec: Société de protection des forêts contre le feu (SOPFEU)
- New Brunswick
- Nova Scotia
- Prince Edward Island
- Newfoundland and Labrador
- Yukon
- Northwest Territories
- Nunavut
- Parks Canada
- Natural Resources Canada
- Department of National Defence
