= Snake River (Sahtaneh River tributary) =

- Location within Canada

Location
- Country: Canada
- Province: British Columbia
- District: Peace River Land District

The Snake River is a river in Canada, located in northeastern British Columbia. The area around the Snake River grows mainly boreal (pine) forest, and is almost uninhabited, with less than two inhabitants per square kilometre. It lies in the boreal (subarctic) climate zone. The annual average temperature is −2 °C. The warmest month is July, when the average temperature is 16 °C, and the coldest is January, with −21 °C.

== See also ==
- List of rivers of British Columbia (by watershed)
