= Holdover fire =

Type of wildfire, peat fire that burns from year to year

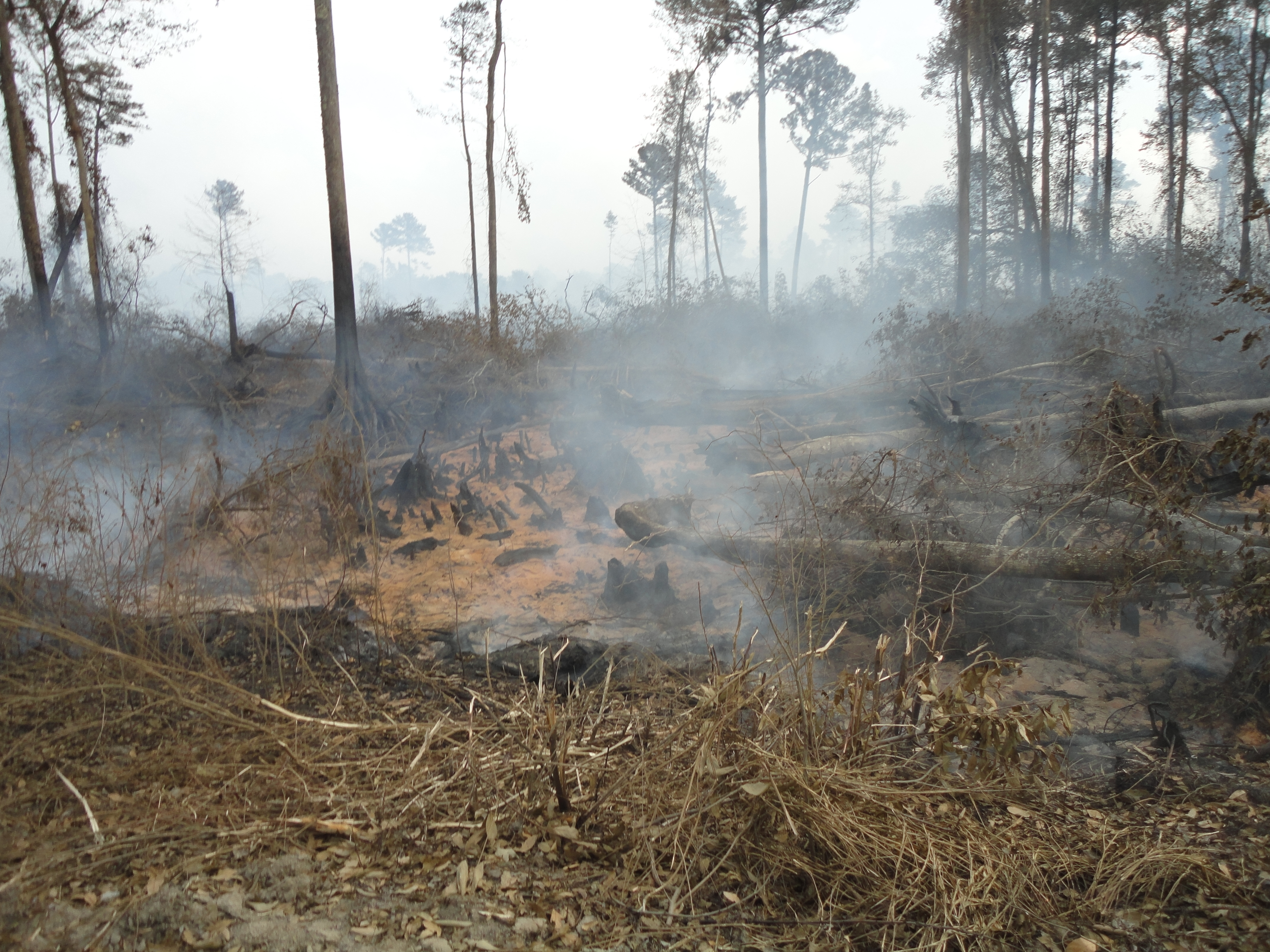
A smouldering peat fire deep in the soil of the Great Dismal Swamp, Great Dismal Swamp National Wildlife Refuge, on the border of Virginia and North Carolina

In wildfires, a holdover fire, or overwintering fire is a peat fire which persists from year to year. It is also sometimes called a "zombie fire".

== Arctic tundra ==
Such fires typically occur in Arctic tundra, smouldering during the winter under the snow and then becoming more intense during the summer.

A study conducted from 2002–2018 in Alaska and the Northwest Territories found that this type of fire burned only 0.8% of the total area burned by all types of fires and that this type of fire caused only 0.5% of the total carbon emissions released by all types of fires.

During the summer of 2019, such fires were estimated to have generated 173 million tonnes of carbon dioxide (CO_{2}), with an estimate of 244 million tonnes from January to August 2019. The smoke and soot from such fires darken the region, so contributing to further warming and further fires. The loss of peat is also a loss of a store for CO_{2}. Images from satellites such as Sentinel-2 have been used to identify such hot spots.

== Other locations ==
The term holdover fire has also been used to describe underground, smoldering fires in other regions and biomes. In chaparral environments, deep woody taproots from plants like manzanita or chamise can smolder for extended period after the fire has been extinguished at the surface. This can create latent heat and sparks that can trigger new fires. Such a scenario has been proposed to have triggered the 2025 Palisades fire, which may have started as a holdover fire from the earlier Lachman fire. Smoldering buried debris has also been pointed to as the trigger of the 2023 Lahaina fire, and the 1991 Tunnel Fire that killed 25 people in Oakland, California.

== See also ==
- Arctic methane emissions
- Climate change
- Polar amplification
