= Copernicus Atmosphere Monitoring Service =

The Copernicus Atmosphere Monitoring Service (CAMS) is a service implemented by the European Centre for Medium-Range Weather Forecasts (ECMWF), launched in November 11, 2014, that provides continuous data and information on atmospheric composition. CAMS, which is part of the Copernicus Programme, describes the current situation, forecasts the situation a few days ahead, and analyses consistently retrospective data records for recent years. This service has around 10 years of developments, and its current precursor project, MACC-III (Monitoring Atmospheric Composition and Climate - Interim Implementation), is delivering the pre-operational Copernicus Atmosphere Service. CAMS tracks air pollution, solar energy, greenhouse gases and climate forcing globally.

== Background ==
CAMs is one of the six services that are part of the earth observation programme called Copernicus, which is managed and coordinated by the European Commission, the European Space Agency (ESA), along with EU Member States and some EU Agencies. Copernicus was established on April 3, 2014. Prior to Copernicus, the EU had initiated GMES in 2010.
