= Société de protection des forêts contre le feu =

La Société de protection des forêts contre le feu, better known by its acronym SOPFEU, is Quebec's provincial wildfire management agency. Organized as a non-profit, its stated mission is to "provide the very best forest fire protection so as to ensure the sustainability of forest areas at the lowest possible cost."

== Structure ==
Unlike many other governmental or quasi-governmental agencies that are tasked with managing wildfires, SOPFEU is not a branch of government or an emergency services agency. Rather, it is a private non-profit organization tasked by the Government of Quebec with the prevention and suppression of wildfires. Its funding comes from both the provincial government and from other stakeholders.
