= Pimicikamak Cree Nation =

Nation of Cree indigenous people in Canada

Pimicikamak Cree Nation is sometimes used as a name for Pimicikamak, one of the more populous Cree indigenous peoples in Canada. Etymologically, "Pimicikamak Cree Nation" is a description of this indigenous people, and is not a name.

"Pimicikamak" is the Cree name of an indigenous people whose traditional territory was the drainage basin of the upper Nelson River in what came to be known as Rupert's Land. "Cree" is 18th-Century French slang derived from "the Old Algonkin dialect form "kiristino", which was "the name of an obscure band of Indians who roamed the region south of James Bay in the first half of the seventeenth century". It is an exonym that was not used by the Pimicikamak people to describe themselves. Today, "Crees use the name Cree to refer to themselves only when speaking English or French." "Nation" is an English word. The combination of these three terms describes the Pimicikamak people less accurately than its own name "Pimicikamak".

"Pimicikamak Cree Nation" may be abbreviated as "PCN" referring erroneously to the Cross Lake Band of Indians or Cross Lake First Nation. Pimicikamak is an indigenous people whose origins lie in pre-history; the Cross Lake Band of Indians is a pseudo-corporate legal entity created by the Indian Act. The Pimicikamak people is governed by four councils under customary law. Cross Lake First Nation is governed by a Band Council under the Indian Act.

== Suicide crisis ==
The Pimicikamak Cree Nation has, as of 2016, the highest suicide rate in all of Canada. Residents made 140 attempts in the span of a fortnight in March 2016, or ten per day. Band councillor Donnie McKay blamed the epidemic on the isolated community's lack of jobs, guidance counselors and suicide prevention specialists.

One noted program to counter the suicide epidemic is the Pimicikamak Thunder, a youth softball team. The team was profiled in The Sound of Thunder, a 2017 documentary feature produced by and aired on TSN as part of Bell Let's Talk.

The film "Twilight Dancers" was written and directed by Theola Ross, a member of the Pimicikamak Cree Nation. It centered around the 2016 suicide crisis and how a group of young dancers used their art and tradition to heal and survive.

== Wildfire crisis ==
During the 2025 Canadian wildfires, the reserve was threatened by wildfire. The community struggled to stage an evacuation as wildfires threatened their community and the roads - Manitoba Provincial Road 373 and Manitoba Provincial Road 374 - that connected them to the outside world.
