= Pimicikamak government =

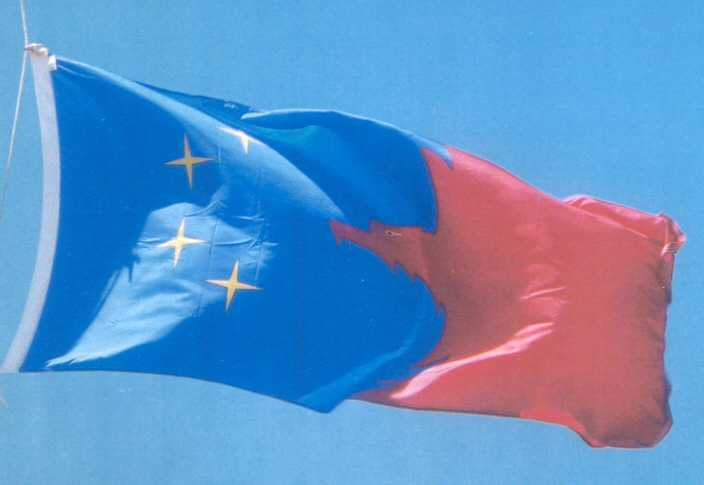
Pimicikamak flag

Pimicikamak is an indigenous people in Canada. Pimicikamak is related to, but constitutionally, legally, historically and administratively distinct from, the Cross Lake First Nation which is a statutory creation that provides services on behalf of the Canadian Government. Pimicikamak government is based on self-determination and has a unique form. Its traditional government under customary law was based on consensus, with leadership based on earned respect.

== Traditional government ==
A modern Pimicikamak leader is quoted as saying: "Our ancestors governed themselves in our territory since time immemorial. Pimicikamak did not have rulers. It had leaders. Leadership was based on consensus and especially upon respect that was earned." Oral history told by Pimicikamak elders says that traditional government under customary law (Pimicikamāk okimākānak) was based on consensus, like other Cree governments. Customary law is well-recognized in the jurisprudence of the US, UK, and Canada. Pimicikamak leaders were respected persons, possibly of the Midewiwin society. "A leader held his position as long as he had the respect of the people." As well, oral history says that Elders (the Council of Fire) and women played distinct roles in governance.

== Original constitution ==
Like other indigenous peoples in North America. Pimicikamak was constituted as a self-governing people under spiritual as well as temporal laws. These were passed down orally through stories, ceremonies and traditions that formed part of a culture that enabled Pimicikamak's ancestors to survive as a people in a harsh environment for thousands of years. Many stories say that the elders had a role in speaking of the law and the women had a role in organizing Pimicikamak society. Both came into play at summer gatherings. The Pimicikamak constitution derives from those times. It rests upon custom and is largely uncodified, characteristics it shares with the government of the United Kingdom. It has since evolved into a modern customary form.

== Treaty 5 ==
On September 24, 1875, Tepastenam and two others signed Treaty 5 with the British Crown at Norway House on behalf of Pimicikamak. It had the effect of amending and partly codifying Pimicikamak's customary constitution and laws. The official written text of the Treaty implicitly depends upon the continuance of Pimicikamak self-government. It appears that, until the 1990s, no other part of Pimicikamak law was codified.

== Modern constitutional changes ==
"Pimicikamak’s traditional government is quite new, and yet it is also ancient." Beginning in 1996, parts of the Pimicikamak traditional constitution were updated and codified in written laws in English. They are based upon self-determination, the inherent right of self-government, the Rule of Law and updated traditional principles of democracy and accountability. They deal with making laws in writing, defining who is a Pimicikamak citizen and electing an Executive Council. Pimicikamak government is an example of direct democracy. Modern written Pimicikamak customary law is subject to acceptance by consensus of a general assembly of the Pimicikamak public. The roles of the Secretary to the Councils as keeper of customary laws and as the interface between the oral Cree traditional government and the written English world it faces may have arisen in the 1990s.

== Councils ==
Pimicikamak's four councils derive from its traditional form of governance by the elders and women. Each council is elected by its own constituency under its own rules and functions in its own roles by consensus. National policy is established by consensus of the Four Councils (itself a single entity composed of the members of all four councils). The councils are subject to Pimicikamak law. Pimicikamak law requires the Executive Council to give effect to national policy. Because the traditional councils can call an Executive Council election at any time, and its members are the Band Council members ex officio, the Band Council tends to regard Pimicikamak national policy as persuasive.

== Canadian government relations ==
The government of Canada has not acknowledged Pimicikamak's customary government in modern times. Its policy is that self-government is an inherent right of aboriginal peoples in Canada and that this right is recognized and affirmed by the Constitution of Canada. "The federal government supports the concept of self-government being exercised by Aboriginal nations or other larger groupings of Aboriginal people." but does not accept that an aboriginal people may exercise this right without first negotiating it. Negotiation and legislation of self-government can result in domestic, dependent status similar to that of Indian nations in the United States of America, whose governments are defined by Act of Congress. Canada has not generally accepted Pimicikamak's policy of exercising its inherent right. The government of Canada prefers to deal with Cross Lake First Nation, a domestic, dependent, municipal form of government established by Act of Parliament. Under this federal legislation and the terms of various agreements, the Band Council acts as the agent of the Minister of Indian Affairs and Northern Development in delivering programs to Indians on reserve. Since 1999, several Band Councils have taken and held office pursuant to the Pimicikamak Election Law, 1999 instead of the federal legislation.

== Manitoba government relations ==
The government of Manitoba has a respectful relationship with the Pimicikamak government. In 2002, the Manitoba Minister of Northern and Aboriginal Affairs, the late Honorable Oscar Lathlin, set a precedent by formally addressing the Pimicikamak National Assembly. Premier Gary Doer has acknowledged Pimicikamak's government and traditional councils and formally met with its traditional chiefs.
