= Brady Keeper =

Canadian ice hockey player (born 1996)

- Born: June 5, 1996 (age 30) Cross Lake, Manitoba, Canada
- Height: 6 ft 2 in (188 cm)
- Weight: 197 lb (89 kg; 14 st 1 lb)
- Position: Defence
- Shot: Right
- ECHL team Former teams: South Carolina Stingrays; Florida Panthers
- NHL draft: Undrafted
- Playing career: 2019–2025

Brady Keeper (born June 5, 1996) is a Canadian professional ice hockey defenceman for the South Carolina Stingrays of the ECHL. Originally undrafted by teams in the National Hockey League (NHL), Keeper played for the Florida Panthers. He has spent the rest of his professional career in minor or European leagues. He is a member of the Cross Lake First Nation.

== Playing career ==
=== Amateur ===
Keeper played junior hockey with the OCN Blizzard of the Manitoba Junior Hockey League (MJHL) from 2013 to 2017 and was named the league's Most Valuable Player and Top Defenceman for the 2016–17 season. He earned a scholarship to the University of Maine and played two collegiate seasons for the National Collegiate Athletic Association (NCAA) Maine Black Bears, accumulating 13 goals and 57 points in 73 games. He almost quit after two weeks, but was convinced to stay. He was named to Hockey East's Third All-Star team in 2019.

=== Professional ===
Having gone undrafted into the National Hockey League (NHL), Keeper left the University of Maine to sign an entry-level contract with the Florida Panthers on March 21, 2019. He made his NHL debut on March 28 against the Ottawa Senators. He spent most of the 2019–20 season with the Panthers' American Hockey League (AHL) affiliate, the Springfield Thunderbirds, scoring 6 goals and 18 points in 61 games. Keeper made his 2020 Stanley Cup playoffs debut in the qualifying round on August 4, 2020, in a 4–2 loss to the New York Islanders. As a restricted free agent from the Panthers following the Return to Play qualifying series, Keeper was re-signed to a one-year, two-way contract on August 31. During the pandemic-shortened 2020–21 season, Keeper played with the Syracuse Crunch in the AHL, appearing in 11 games, scoring two goals and three points. He also made one regular season appearance with the Panthers, making his NHL season debut on April 8, 2021, in a 3–0 victory over the Carolina Hurricanes.

As an unrestricted free agent from the Panthers after completing his third season within the organization, Keeper was signed to a two-year, $1.525 million contract with the Vancouver Canucks on July 28, 2021. However, during his first training camp with the Canucks, he broke both his tibia and fibula in his left leg, forcing him to miss the entire 2021–22 NHL season. He returned the following season, but did not make the Canucks, passed through waivers and was assigned to their AHL affiliate, the Abbotsford Canucks. He appeared in 35 games with Abbotsford, scoring one goal and six points.

On July 1, 2023, Keeper was signed to a one-year, two-way contract with the Montreal Canadiens. He was immediately assigned to Canadiens' AHL affiliate, the Laval Rocket. Collectively, Keeper missed three months of the 2023–24 season with an injury to his lower body, limiting him to just 22 games played, scoring one goal and registering four points in that span.

On August 2, 2024, Keeper opted to sign his first professional contract abroad, agreeing to a one-year contract with Slovak club HK Poprad of the Slovak Extraliga.

Keeper then agreed terms with Scottish Elite Ice Hockey League side Glasgow Clan ahead of the 2025–26 season. However, in August 2025, Keeper retired from professional hockey without ever taking to the ice with the Clan. This was due to medical advice following a long-term injury. Despite announcing his retirement due to injury the previous month, Keeper signed a contract with the South Carolina Stingrays for the 2025–26 ECHL season on September 10, 2025. However, he was placed on the team's suspension list on October 13. He did not play a game for the team before he was traded to the Rapid City Rush for future considerations on December 29, 2025.

== Personal life ==
Keeper was born and raised in Cross Lake located in Northern Manitoba, and is the first person from Cross Lake First Nation to play in the NHL.

== Career statistics ==
			Regular season					Playoffs
Season	Team	League	GP	G	A	Pts	PIM	GP	G	A	Pts	PIM
2012–13	Norway House North Stars	KJHL	29	6	28	34	66	2	0	0	0	8
2013–14	Norman Northstars	MMHL	42	7	18	25	99	—	—	—	—	—
2013–14	OCN Blizzard	MJHL	1	0	0	0	0	—	—	—	—	—
2014–15	OCN Blizzard	MJHL	54	13	28	41	160	2	0	1	1	12
2015–16	OCN Blizzard	MJHL	58	16	28	44	202	5	3	1	4	32
2016–17	OCN Blizzard	MJHL	48	23	25	48	82	15	4	12	16	42
2017–18	University of Maine	HE	37	6	16	22	88	—	—	—	—	—
2018–19	University of Maine	HE	36	7	15	22	58	—	—	—	—	—
2018–19	Florida Panthers	NHL	1	0	0	0	0	—	—	—	—	—
2019–20	Springfield Thunderbirds	AHL	61	6	12	18	108	—	—	—	—	—
2019–20	Florida Panthers	NHL	—	—	—	—	—	1	0	0	0	0
2020–21	Syracuse Crunch	AHL	11	2	1	3	12	—	—	—	—	—
2020–21	Florida Panthers	NHL	1	0	0	0	0	—	—	—	—	—
2022–23	Abbotsford Canucks	AHL	35	1	5	6	35	2	1	0	1	4
2023–24	Laval Rocket	AHL	22	1	3	4	53	—	—	—	—	—
2025–26	Rapid City Rush	ECHL	7	2	3	5	9	—	—	—	—
NHL totals			2	0	0	0	0	1	0	0	0	0

== Awards and honours ==
Award	Year	Ref
MJHL
All-Rookie Team	2015	
First All-Star Team	2016, 2017	
Brian Kozak Award (Top Defenceman)	2017	
Steve "Boomer" Hawrysh Award (Most Valuable Player)	2017	
College
HE Third All-Star Team	2019	

== See also ==
- Notable Aboriginal people of Canada
