= Pimicikamak =

First Nations in Manitoba, Canada

Pimicikamak /pɪmɪˈtʃɪkəmæk/ is the name (Note: the Anglicized version of its collective name.) of one of the Cree-speaking aboriginal peoples of Canada. (Note: It is also referred to erroneously as Pimicikamak Cree Nation.) Pimicikamak is "a people of rivers and lakes. The traditional territory of Pimicikamak is around Sipiwesk Lake in the heart of the boreal forest, five hundred kilometres north of Winnipeg, Manitoba. Flowing through their land is Kichi Sipi, the Great River." Pimicikamak's traditional territory also is known as Pimicikamak. (Note: Used in this sense it connotes the rocks, trees, animals, water, humans, etc. as distinct from a purely geographic meaning.)

Pimicikamak is related to but appears to be culturally and linguistically distinct from neighboring Swampy Cree and Rock or Rocky Cree peoples of the boreal forest. There is less than complete consensus about these and other such anthropological definitions that may have been confused by changing fashions in colonial naming. (Note: For example, James Smith, in Handbook of North American Indians, says "[I]t was apparent merely that the name Cree that was [in the late 18th century] extended westward to apply to these divisions, previously known by generic terms...".) The existence of distinct peoples in Canada, though constitutionally entrenched, is controversial by reason of perceived implications for Quebec separatism. The identities and roles of aboriginal peoples in Canada continue to be clarified.

== Names ==
Etymologically, pimicikamāk and related terms were understood as connoting "flowing across". This is widely presumed to be the origin of the name of Cross Lake in Pimicikamak territory. (Note: Note that there was another Cross Lake, now flooded, that was upstream of Grand Rapids, Manitoba, on the Saskatchewan River.) "Pimicikamak" is the collective singular name for the whole people (Note: The singular noun is Pimicikamowinew; its plural is Pimicikamowinewuk.) and also the collective name for its traditional territory. Grouped as part of the closely related Rocky Cree, Pimicikamak refer to themselves as Nahathaway (nīhithawī) (those who speak our language) or ithiniwi (real people); they called themselves "Cree" only when speaking English or French. Canada's history of suppressing indigenous languages, including aboriginal peoples' use of their own names such as "Pimicikamak", was controversial until 2008, when Canada's Prime Minister Stephen Harper publicly acknowledged and apologized for this policy. The name "Pimicikamak" appears to have entered into English-language usage by Cree-speakers in the 1990s. "The Pimicikamak Cree Nation" is a polyglot and imprecise description of Pimicikamak, not a name. It is also known in English as "the Cross Lake Band", a description that may be confused with the Cross Lake Band of Indians (now known as the "Cross Lake First Nation").

== Traditional territory ==
Aboriginal concepts of territory are sui generis and do not correspond to those of Western cartography.

Pimicikamak's traditional territory is reported to have been the watershed of the upper Nelson River. It is located within the boreal forest or taiga of Canada. Like other indigenous peoples, Pimicikamak sees its spiritual relationship with the land as fundamental to its identity. Displacing indigenous spirituality through Christian missions was said to be "one of the most effective tools of assimilation" leading to "conformity within newly prescribed territorial limits." Canadian law continues to recognize relationships of aboriginal peoples with their traditional (cf., treaty) territories.

== History ==
Oral history passed down by Pimicikamak elders says that Pimicikamak existed since time immemorial. Anthropological and archaeological evidence places aboriginal occupation of Pimicikamak after the last ice age "sometime before 4000 B.C.E." European documentary records date back at least to 1768, when a map showed Pemichicomo Lake in the area known as Rupert's Land. In 1770, Thomas Hutchins included the Pemmichi-ke-mè-u people on a list of tribes trading into Hudson Bay. Famed explorer and geographer David Thompson overwintered on Sipiwesk Lake in 1792. Peter Fidler charted the upper Nelson River through Pimicikamak in 1809. Pimicikamak made treaty (Treaty 5) with the Crown in 1875. In 1977 it was party to an amendment (Note: An agreement with Canada, Manitoba and Manitoba Hydro dated 16 December 1977, informally known as the Northern Flood Agreement.) to address effects of the Nelson River Hydroelectric Project operations on its Treaty 5 rights.

== Constitution ==
Like other indigenous peoples in Turtle Island (the name for North America in many indigenous languages), Pimicikamak was constituted under spiritual law. These were passed down orally through stories and reflected in ceremonies and traditions of the Pimicikamak people. They formed part of the culture that enabled it to survive as a people in a harsh environment. Treaty 5, signed by the British Crown and by Tepastenam and two others on Pimicikamak's behalf in 1875, clearly were intended to and did amend this customary constitution. Pimicikamak is a body politic or corporate. In 1996, Pimicikamak enacted its First Written Law which began the adaptation of its constitution to modern circumstances. Since the 1990s Pimicikamak has made other written laws with constitutional effect in the English language, including a citizenship law and an election law. These are based on consensus. The government of Canada has doubted the validity of the First Written Law and written laws made pursuant to it but accepted the validity of one such law, The Pimicikamak Election Law, 1999, on other grounds.

== The Winnipeg Treaty ==
In 1875, the Ministry of the Interior determined to extend the Crown's treaty relations to the peoples east and west but not north of Lake Winnipeg. In September 1875, with Privy Council authority, Treaty Commissioners Alexander Morris and James McKay embarked on the Hudson's Bay Company steamer to several destinations on Lake Winnipeg to make a treaty whose terms, boundaries and signatories were essentially predetermined. The York boat trade via the Hayes River and York Factory on Hudson Bay having collapsed in competition with trade via the Mississippi River, Indians living at Norway House "whose occupation was gone, owing to supplies being brought in by way of the Red River of the North, desired to migrate to the western shore of Lake Winnipeg ...". Morris tells that upon arriving at Norway House, "We found that there were two distinct bands of Indians, the Christian Indians of Norway House, and the Wood or Pagan Indians of Cross Lake." The latter were represented by Tepastenam. Pimicikamak evidently persuaded the Commissioners to include it in Treaty 5, signed on 24 September 1875. Treaty rights are collective, not individual. Under one interpretation of Canadian law, aboriginal peoples may have treaty rights, but these are vested with the entire community and not the band council.

== Other Treaties with the Crown ==
Pimicikamak and the government of Manitoba both regard a 16 December 1977 agreement with Canada and Manitoba Hydro (Note: Known colloquially as the Northern Flood Agreement.) as a modern-day treaty. Pimicikamak regards an 8 May 1998 document signed by representatives of Canada, Manitoba and Manitoba Hydro as a treaty. From the colonial perspective, some treaties with aboriginal peoples have been termed "a different method of expropriation".

== Flag ==
Pimicikamak also has a national flag.

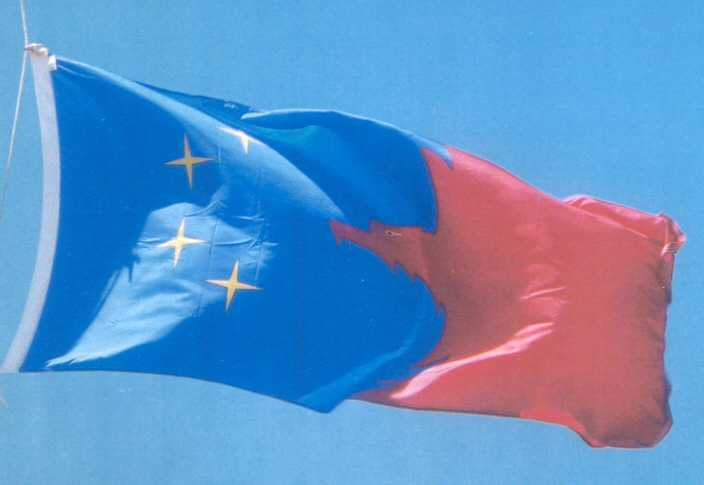

== Laws ==
Like other indigenous peoples that have existed for a long time, Pimicikamak has a body of oral customary law. Since 1995, Pimicikamak has made several customary written laws. (Note: They are in English, with the apparent objective that they be understood by non-Cree-speakers.)

== Government ==
Although Pimicikamak has four councils, Pimicikamak government is, like that of Switzerland, inseparable from the people, with strong elements of direct democracy. Its First Written Law provides for modern customary laws in writing to be accepted by consensus of a general assembly of the Pimicikamak public. National policy is established by consensus of the Four Councils. (Note: The Four Councils is a single entity composed of the membership of each of the four councils.) The Executive Council is responsible for giving effect to national policy.

== Traditional government ==
Oral history recorded by elders in the 1990s says that in traditional Pimicikamak government the people were warmed by four fires. These were Kiseyak Otabiwinik (where the Elders sit), Iskweyanak (the women), Opimbatawuk (the runners, or youth) and Okaniskoteyawuk (the hunters & warriors; lit., the keepers of the gate). The first two of these continued through the 20th century. The Council of Elders may have been based on Midewiwin society practices introduced hundreds of years ago from neighbouring Ojibwa (known to themselves as the Anishinaabeg). Oral history from the Elders provided the continuing source of Pimicikamak temporal or customary law. The Women's Council governed family and community life during winter dispersal and summer gatherings.

=== Women's Council ===
Historically, women appear to have had higher status in Cree societies than that accorded by contemporaneous European and some other aboriginal civilizations. "Cree women enjoyed a degree of autonomy that confounded European men who married Aboriginal women." "Crees viewed with contempt what they conceived as harsh treatment of women by Chipewyan males." In the Pimicikamak world view, women are symbolically associated with water, life, the direction west, and the color red. The Women's Council is viewed by some as first in precedence of the Pimicikamak councils. (Note: Pimicikamak as a society seems in another sense to deny the idea of precedence.) The reason given is that all members of the Councils received the gift of life from women, beginning the circle of life. Consistent with their historical status, the Women's Council has key roles in Pimicikamak government including control of elections and a veto over written laws.

=== Council of Elders ===
Traditionally, elders were viewed as the lawyers or law-givers of Pimicikamak. They were the repository of the wisdom that enabled the Pimicikamak people to survive. Consistent with the traditional role, the Council of Elders must approve written laws by consensus. In recent times the fallout of the residential school system may have imposed difficulty on this role.

=== Youth Council ===
The Youth Council took on constitutional responsibilities in the 1990s. It appears to be regarded as a traditional council.

== Communities ==
The largest community in Pimicikamak is Cross Lake, now connected to the western part of its traditional territory by the Kichi Sipi Bridge. Thicket Portage, Pikwitonei and Wabowden are also largely Pimicikamak communities in the west and north of Pimicikamak traditional territory. (Note: Many of their residents are descended from those Pimicikamak who did not take up residence at Cross Lake after 1875.) Non-Pimicikamak Canadian residents have rights under Treaty 5.
