= Hargrave River (Manitoba) =

River in Manitoba, Canada

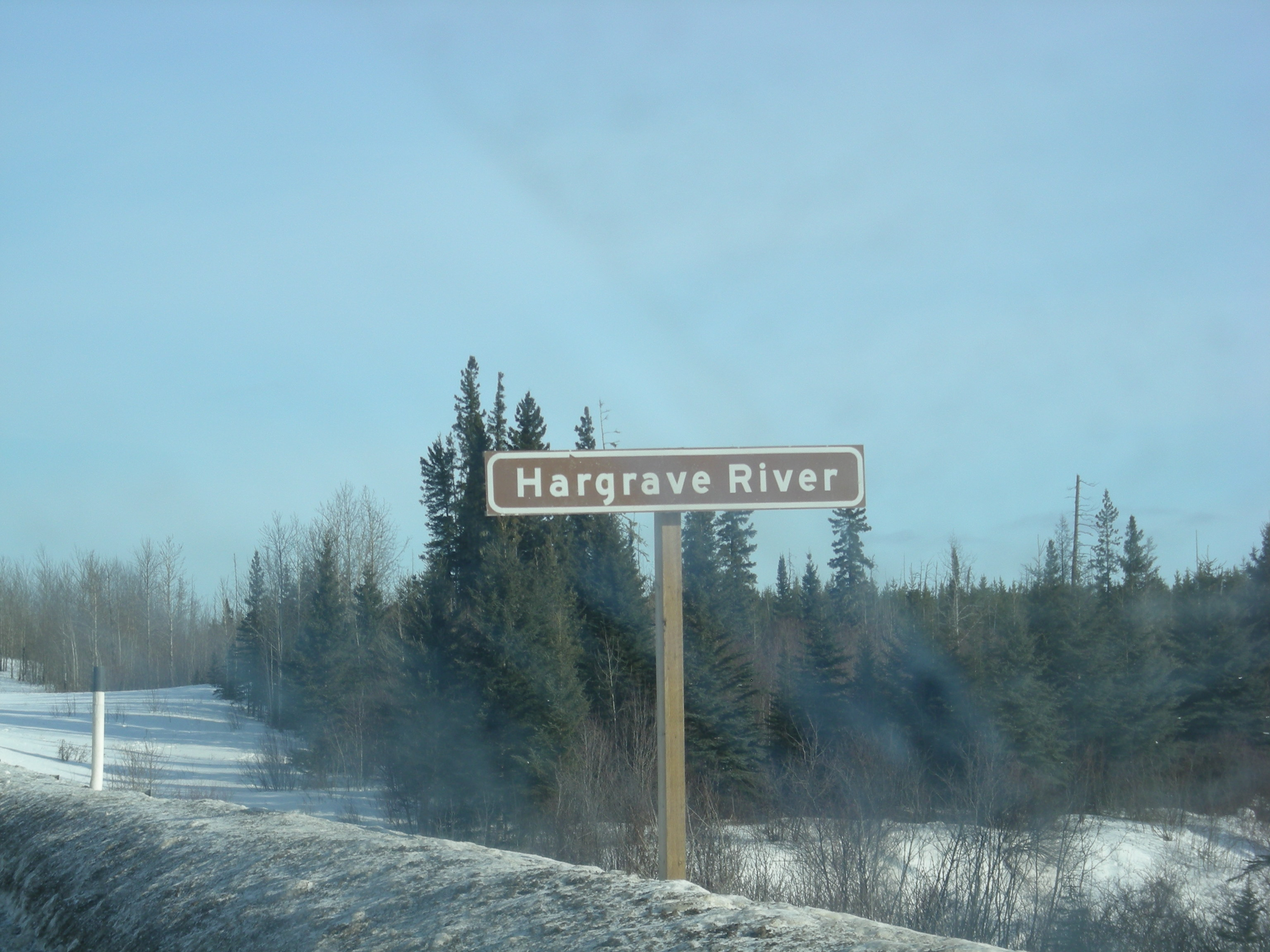
- Sign for Hargrave River

- Location of the mouth of Hargrave River in Manitoba

Location
- Country: Canada
- Province: Manitoba
- Region: Northern

Physical characteristics
- Source: Hargrave Lake
  - coordinates: 54°30′15″N 99°34′46″W
  - elevation: 264 m (866 ft)
- Mouth: Hill Lake on the Minago River
  - coordinates: 54°24′06″N 98°48′29″W
  - elevation: 210 m (690 ft)

Basin features
- River system: Hudson Bay drainage basin

The Hargrave River is a river in the Hudson Bay drainage basin in Northern Manitoba, Canada. It flows in a southeasterly direction from its source at Hargrave Lake to Hill Lake on the Minago River, which flows into Cross Lake on the Nelson River.

Tributaries include Fenton Creek and Huzyk Creek, which flow in from the west.

== See also ==
- List of rivers of Manitoba
