= Kichi Sipi Bridge =

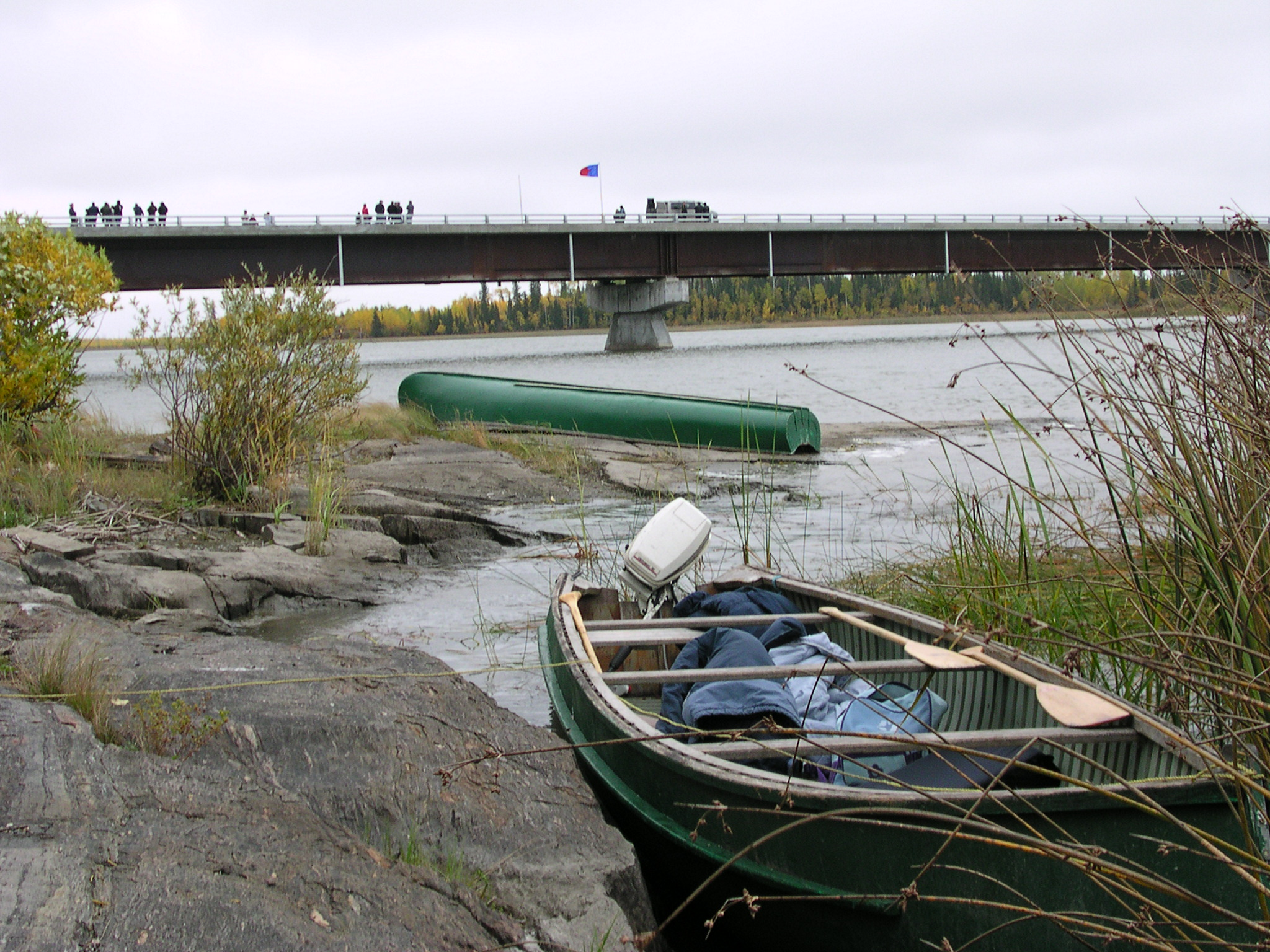
- Coordinates: 54°33′40″N 97°44′40″W
- Carries: 2 lanes of PR 374
- Crosses: Nelson River
- Locale: near Cross Lake, Manitoba, Canada

Characteristics
- Material: Concrete and steel
- Total length: 260 m (850 ft)
- Longest span: 2 x 71 m (233 ft)
- No. of spans: 4
- Piers in water: 2

History
- Designer: Earth Tech
- Opened: December 16, 2002

Location
- Interactive map of Kichi Sipi Bridge

The Kichi Sipi Bridge is a 260-metre (850 ft) long, four-span bridge that crosses a deep channel of the Nelson River south of Cross Lake in Manitoba, providing the only all-weather road link between north-eastern Manitoba and the rest of Canada (and North America).

It is the second longest road bridge in Manitoba. (Note: The longest is the Bridge to Nowhere, at the Highway 4 crossing over the Red River, north of Selkirk in southern Manitoba.) Kichi sipi is Cree for 'Great River'.

== Background ==
Until 2002, the only road links to eastern Manitoba north of 51° (an area of some 120,000 sq. miles, with numerous communities) were seasonal ice roads.

Kichi Sipi Bridge was constructed by the Government of Manitoba as a result of a lawsuit by Cross Lake Indian Band. The lawsuit arose in turn from the 1977 Northern Flood Agreement, between five bands (Note: They are the Indian Bands of Nelson House, Norway House, Cross Lake (Pimicikamak), Split Lake, and York Factory.) and the Crown concerning effects of hydro-electric development on several rivers in Manitoba. Article 17.1 of the agreement undertakes a policy of implementing recommendations that a government-sponsored Study Board made in 1975, including "that an all-weather road be built connecting the Cross Lake community road network with the Jenpeg access road." Article 14.2 provides that if such policies are not fully implemented in a timely way the bands may claim damages. In Claim 109, Cross Lake Indian Band sought damages for governmental failure to build an all-weather road to Cross Lake, including the lack of an all-weather crossing over the Nelson River (originally known as Kichi Sipi).

The governments of Canada and Manitoba took the position that Provincial Road 374, including a ferry crossing over the Nelson River, was an all-weather road. In 1993, the continuing arbitrator charged with enforcing the agreement found that, "there is at present no all-weather road connecting Cross Lake and Jenpeg" because there was no bridge across the Nelson River.

After further arbitration hearings, the Manitoba Court of Appeal (Note: The agreement provides that the Manitoba Court of Appeal, as persona designata, may hear and decide appeals from the arbitrator's decisions.) (Note: The agreement provides that the Manitoba Court of Appeal, as persona designata, may hear and decide appeals from the arbitrator's decisions.) finally ruled that one or both of the federal and provincial governments was liable to pay damages as long as no bridge was in place. The agreement provides that there is no appeal from the decision of the court.

== Construction ==
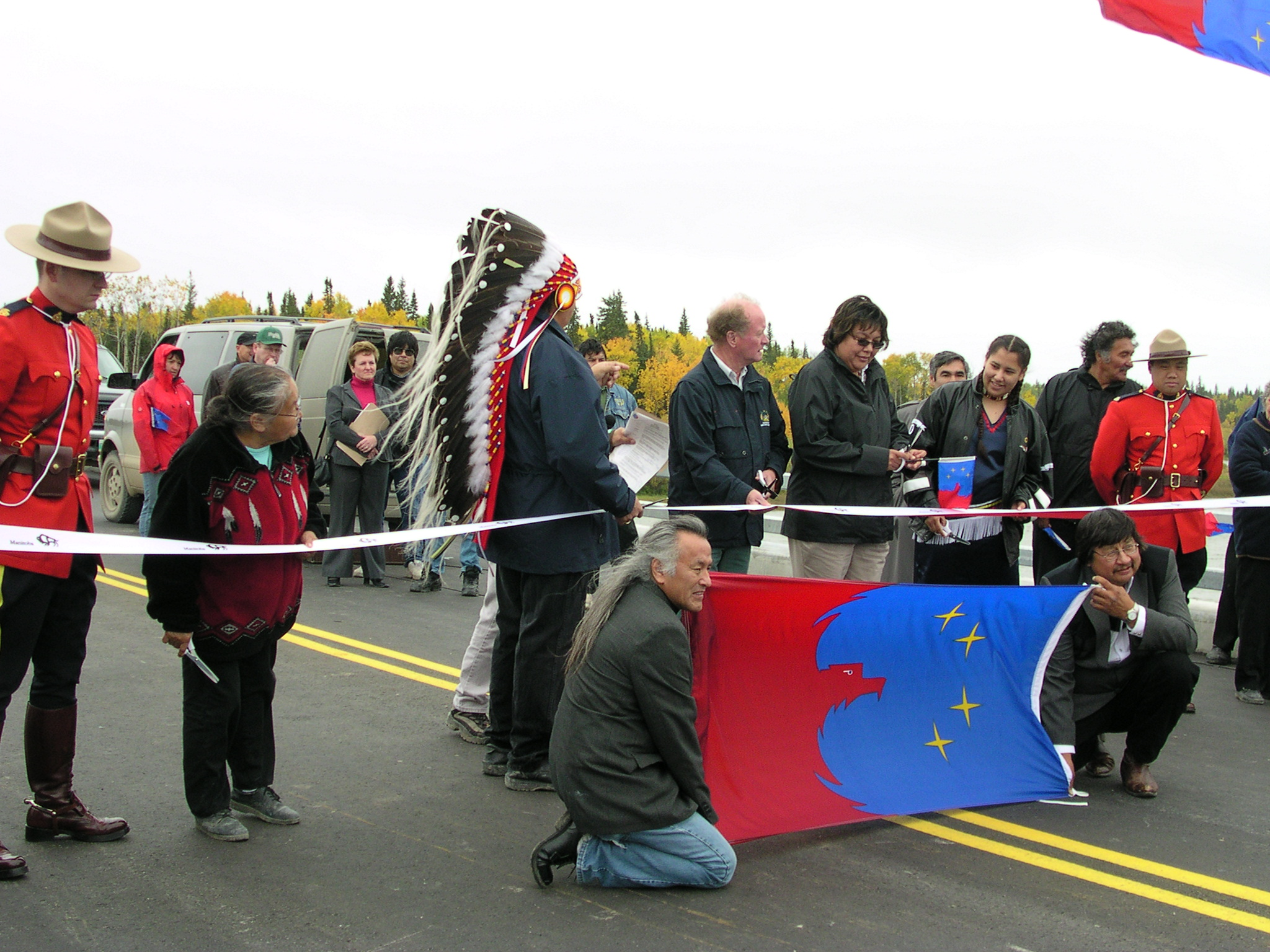
Opening of the Kichi Sipi Bridge

In 1999, the Government of Manitoba announced that, in light of the Court's decision, it would implement the policy.

It built a technically innovative quadruple-span concrete and steel bridge at a cost of C$25,000,000. Kichi Sipi Bridge was officially opened on December 16, 2002.

Building the bridge froze the mounting liability for damages. The claim is ongoing as the amount of damages remains to be determined and may exceed the cost of the bridge. Which government is liable to pay the damages has also not yet been determined.

Other communities in north-eastern Manitoba may be linked by all-weather road to the continental highway system via the Kichi Sipi Bridge in future. This was the third public highway bridge to be constructed in northern Manitoba as a result of lawsuits under the Northern Flood Agreement. The other two are the PR 391 crossing over the Footprint River (Note: Claim 14 by the Nelson House Band against the government of Manitoba; it was settled.) and the PR 373 crossing over the Minago River. (Note: Claim 24 by the Cross Lake Band against the government of Manitoba and Manitoba Hydro; it was settled.)
