= Cross Lake, Manitoba =

Cross Lake
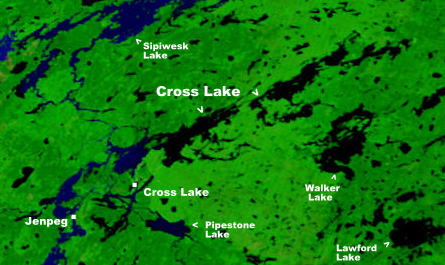
- Location of Cross Lake on Cross Lake

- Location within Manitoba
- Coordinates: 54°37′32″N 97°46′48″W
- Country: Canada
- Province: Manitoba
- Census division: 22
- Elevation: 207 m (679 ft)
- Time zone: UTC−5 (CST)
  - Summer (DST): UTC−6 (CDT)

Cross Lake is a community in the Northern Region of the Canadian province of Manitoba, situated on the shores of the Nelson River where the river enters the namesake Cross Lake. An all-weather road, PR 374, connects the communities to PR 373 via the Kichi Sipi Bridge.

Although one population centre, it is politically divided into 4 entities:

- Cross Lake unincorporated designated place, part of Unorganized Division No. 22 – 20.42 km^{2} (7.88 sq mi), 512 people (in 2021)
- Cross Lake 19 Indian reserve of the Cross Lake First Nation (Pimicikamak Cree) – 23.18 km^{2} (8.95 sq mi), 1,865 people (in 2021)
- Cross Lake 19A Indian reserve, also Cross Lake First Nation – 6.05 km^{2} (2.34 sq mi), 2,045 people (in 2021)
- Cross Lake 19E Indian reserve, also Cross Lake First Nation – 7.32 km^{2} (2.83 sq mi), 763 people (in 2021)

== History ==
In 1795, James Tate established a Hudson's Bay Company (HBC) fur-trade post on the southern end of Cross Lake, first called "X" Lake and then Apsley House in 1796. But in spring of that year, it was abandoned. It was re-established in 1849, but again closed a year later.

In 1869, a HBC post reopened on the lake. In 1886 and 1887, the HBC built new facilities on the north side of the lake's narrows. From circa 1885 to 1889, this post was also responsible for an outpost at Cross Portage.

In 1959, the post became part of the HBC Northern Stores Department. HBC divested this department in 1987 to The North West Company, which still operates a Northern Store at Cross Lake.

In March 2016, First Nation officials in Cross Lake declared a state of emergency because of an epidemic of suicides. There had been "six suicides in the last two months and 140 attempts in the last two weeks alone", and band councilor Donnie McKay said the community "is traumatized and needs immediate help from the provincial and federal governments".

== Geography ==
The communities are situated on the eastern shores of Cross Island and Cross Lake. The lake is on the Nelson River north of Lake Winnipeg. It is long and narrow and extends 102 km (63 mi) east-northeast. The Nelson enters and leaves on the west side. The Minago River enters on the west. From the Minago a portage trail leads to Moose Lake and the Saskatchewan River. On the east side via the Walker River, Walker Lake and Kapaspwaypanik Lake the Kapaspwaypanik Portage leads to the Carrot River and Oxford Lake on the Hayes River.

It is located about 520 kilometres (320 mi) by air north of Winnipeg, and 120 kilometres (75 mi) by air south of Thompson.

=== Climate ===
Cross Lake has a subarctic climate (Koppen: Dfc), typical of Northern Manitoba. Temperatures in the summer are warm, whilst in the winter they are bitterly cold.

Climate data for Cross Lake
Month	Jan	Feb	Mar	Apr	May	Jun	Jul	Aug	Sep	Oct	Nov	Dec	Year
Record high °C (°F)	7.5 (45.5)	8.2 (46.8)	15 (59)	27.5 (81.5)	33.5 (92.3)	33.5 (92.3)	35.5 (95.9)	34 (93)	31.5 (88.7)	21 (70)	15.6 (60.1)	6 (43)	35.5 (95.9)
Mean daily maximum °C (°F)	−17.4 (0.7)	−12.1 (10.2)	−4.2 (24.4)	5.5 (41.9)	14 (57)	20.2 (68.4)	23.3 (73.9)	21.7 (71.1)	13.6 (56.5)	5.4 (41.7)	−5.5 (22.1)	−14.7 (5.5)	4.2 (39.6)
Mean daily minimum °C (°F)	−26.5 (−15.7)	−22.4 (−8.3)	−16.3 (2.7)	−6 (21)	2.7 (36.9)	9.4 (48.9)	12.8 (55.0)	11.6 (52.9)	5.1 (41.2)	−1.3 (29.7)	−12.2 (10.0)	−23 (−9)	−5.5 (22.1)
Record low °C (°F)	−44 (−47)	−42 (−44)	−40 (−40)	−29.4 (−20.9)	−16 (3)	−2 (28)	3 (37)	−0.6 (30.9)	−6 (21)	−18.5 (−1.3)	−37.2 (−35.0)	−41.5 (−42.7)	−44 (−47)
Average precipitation mm (inches)	17.3 (0.68)	16.5 (0.65)	16.6 (0.65)	18.4 (0.72)	42.6 (1.68)	68.6 (2.70)	69.7 (2.74)	67 (2.6)	53.5 (2.11)	33.4 (1.31)	23.2 (0.91)	25.6 (1.01)	452.3 (17.81)
Source: Environment Canada

== Demographics ==
In the 2021 Census of Population conducted by Statistics Canada, Cross Lake had a population of 521 living in 139 of its 162 total private dwellings, a change of 17.6% from its 2016 population of 443. With a land area of 20.42 km^{2} (7.88 sq mi), it had a population density of 25.5/km^{2} (66.1/sq mi) in 2021.

The adjoining reserves of Cross Lake 19 (population 1,751 in 2011), Cross Lake 19A (population 1,889 in 2011) and Cross Lake 19E (population 682 in 2011) of the Cross Lake First Nation had a combined population of 7,622 in 2011.

Together these communities formed a population centre of 9,033 in 2017.

== Notable people ==
- Brady Keeper, professional hockey player
- Ernest Monias, musician
