= CJPG-FM =

Radio station in Manitoba

Coordinates: 49°58′09″N 98°22′27″W

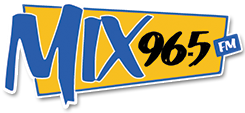
- Portage la Prairie, Manitoba; Canada
- Broadcast area: Central Plains Region
- Frequency: 96.5 MHz
- Branding: Mix 96

Programming
- Format: Hot adult contemporary

Ownership
- Owner: Golden West Broadcasting
- Sister stations: CFRY, CHPO-FM

History
- First air date: May 4, 2004
- Call sign meaning: "Portage"

Technical information
- Class: C3
- ERP: 24,000 watts
- HAAT: 73.5 metres (241 ft)

Links
- Website: portageonline.com/mix96

CJPG-FM is a Canadian radio station being licensed to Portage la Prairie, Manitoba, serving the Central Plains Region broadcasting at 96.5 FM with a hot adult contemporary format branded as Mix 96. This radio station also provides local news, sports and weather to its listeners. The station is currently owned by Golden West Broadcasting, and is located at 2390 Sissons Drive, along with sister stations CFRY and CHPO-FM. While the transmitter is located west of Portage La Prairie.
