= CHPO-FM =

Radio station in Portage la Prairie, Manitoba

Coordinates: 49.973879°N 98.326406°W

Portage la Prairie, Manitoba; Canada
- Broadcast area: Central Plains Region
- Frequency: 93.1 MHz
- Branding: Country 93

Programming
- Format: Country

Ownership
- Owner: Golden West Broadcasting
- Sister stations: CFRY, CJPG-FM

Technical information
- Class: B
- ERP: 27,000 watts
- HAAT: 73.5 metres (241 ft)

Links
- Webcast: Listen Live
- Website: portageonline.com/radio/country93

CHPO-FM is a radio station which broadcasts a country format on the frequency of 93.1 MHz in Portage la Prairie, Manitoba, Canada. This radio station also provides local news, sports and weather to its listeners. The station is owned by Golden West Broadcasting, and is located at 2390 Sissons Drive, along with CFRY and CJPG-FM.

== History ==
The owners received approval by the CRTC on October 2, 2013, which will replace CFRY AM's current repeater, CFRY-FM-1. The new station will broadcast using the same facility and parameters as CFRY-FM-1, with a maximum effective radiated power of 27,000 watts (non-directional antenna with an effective height of antenna above average terrain of 73.5 metres).

Originally, it was planned to broadcast as CFRY-FM, while its original parent station, CFRY AM, continued its country format. It was later revealed that the station would switch to a classic rock format under the new call letters of CHPO-FM, ending its 19-year FM simulcast as CFRY-1-FM. However, the station instead launched as Country 93.1 FM, the current format.
