= Portage la Prairie =

City in Manitoba, Canada

- City
- City of Portage la Prairie
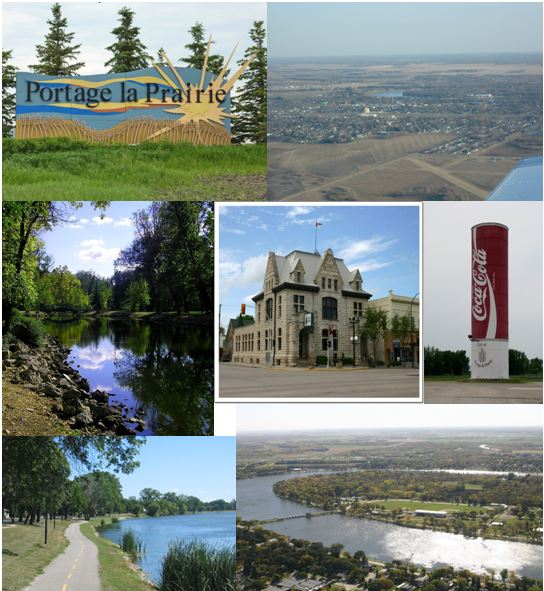
- Clockwise from top left to centre: City Welcome Sign, Aerial View of Portage la Prairie, World's Largest Coca-Cola Can, Birds' Eye View of Crescent Lake and Island Park, Waterfront Active Transport Route, Island Park, City Hall

- Flag
- Nicknames: Portage, P. la P.
- Motto: Progress
- City boundaries

- Location in Canada Location in Manitoba
- Coordinates: 49°58′22″N 98°17′31″W
- Country: Canada
- Province: Manitoba
- Region: Central Plains
- Established: 1738 (Fort La Reine)
- Settled: 1851 (village)
- Incorporated: 1880 (town); 1907 (city)

Government
  - Type: Mayor–council government
  - Mayor: Sharilyn Knox
  - City Council: Colin Doyle, Ryan Espey, Joe Masi, Preston Meier, Faron Nicholls, Terrie Porter
  - Member of Parliament (MP): Branden Leslie
  - Member of Legislative Assembly (MLA): Jeff Bereza

Area
  - Land: 24.72 km^{2} (9.54 sq mi)
  - Metro: 2,029.94 km^{2} (783.76 sq mi)
- Elevation: 261 m (856 ft)

Population (2021)
  - City: 13,270 (5th)
  - Density: 536.8/km^{2} (1,390/sq mi)
  - Metro density: 10.1/km^{2} (26/sq mi)
- Demonym(s): Portager, Portage la Prairian
- Time zone: UTC-6 (Central Time zone)
  - Summer (DST): UTC-5
- Forward sortation area: R1N
- Area code: 204/431
- Website: www.city.portage-la-prairie.mb.ca

Portage la Prairie (/ˈpɔːrtɪdʒ lə ˈprɛəri/) is a small city in the Central Plains Region of the province of Manitoba, Canada. Its land area is 24.68 square kilometres (9.53 sq mi). In 2016, the population was 13,304 people, making it the fifth most-populous city in Manitoba.

Portage la Prairie is approximately 75 kilometres (47 mi) west of Winnipeg, alongside the Trans-Canada Highway (exactly halfway between the provincial boundaries of Saskatchewan and Ontario). It sits on the Assiniboine River, which flooded the town persistently until a diversion channel north to Lake Manitoba (the Portage Diversion) was built to divert the flood waters. The city is surrounded by the Rural Municipality of Portage la Prairie.

According to Environment Canada, Portage la Prairie has the most sunny days during the warm months in Canada. It is the administrative headquarters of the Dakota Tipi First Nations reserve.

== History ==
=== Pre-colonial era ===
Long before European settlers arrived in the mid-1800s, the Portage la Prairie area was first inhabited by several Indigenous nations (including the Anishinaabe/Ojibwe, Cree, and Dakota/Sioux peoples) at various times across millennia.

Though anthropological evidence suggests the emergence of pre-historic plains cultures in southwestern Manitoba as early as 12,000 years ago, habitable grasslands and human activity likely never emerged around present-day Portage la Prairie until the receding of Lake Agassiz 8,000–10,000 years ago.

=== Fur trade ===
Legend has it that coureurs des bois Pierre-Esprit Radisson and Médard des Groseilliers—both instrumental in the founding of the Hudson's Bay Company—may have been the first Europeans to visit the area as early as the mid-17th century. The name "Portage la Prairie", perhaps coined by these early explorers, is derived from the French word portage, which means to carry a canoe overland between waterways, in this case over "the prairie". This particular "portage" route, used by Indigenous peoples even before the global Fur Trade, ran for 25 kilometres between the Assiniboine River and Lake Manitoba.

In September 1738, after the Assiniboine River fur trade had extended into Western Canada, Pierre Gaultier de Varennes, sieur de La Vérendrye (a French-Canadian explorer and fur trader) built Fort La Reine north of the Assiniboine River. The fort served primarily as a French fur trading post, while also providing the explorers with a "home" operating base from which they would explore other parts of central Manitoba and western North America. The fort ceased operations after burning to the ground in 1759, toward the end of New France. During intermittent periods between the years 1794 and 1913, both the Northwest Company and Hudson's Bay Company had successfully established and operated trading posts in the area (the two entities amalgamated in 1821).

=== Arrival of European settlers ===
In 1851, Archdeacon William Cochrane (Cockran) of the Anglican Church, John McLean, as well as other ambitious settlers, were among the first to acquire permanent land in the area from the local Indigenous people, around what is now Crescent Lake (formerly known as "The Slough").

A school was soon built as settlers poured in from the east and the community began to develop, followed by a church (St. Mary's La Prairie, 1854), and soon, numerous local businesses. The fertile soils of the Portage la Prairie area were "discovered" in the 1850s, giving birth to the future, agriculturally-based economy of the village; Cochrane encouraged people to start growing crops and gardens on their properties to fulfil the needs of the growing food demand. A local government was formed in 1857 and by the 1860s, there were sixty homes in the community.

=== Republic of Manitobah ===
For a brief period between 1867 and 1868, just before the province of Manitoba entered confederation, Thomas Spence—a councillor for Louis Riel's Provisional Government—controversially led an organized movement to establish an independent state around the community of Portage la Prairie, known as the Republic of Manitobah. Spence's hopeful plans for a new republic were soon quashed as his movement was never recognized as an official government nor granted any royal assent by the British monarchy.

=== Birth and growth of a Prairie city ===
The 1870s was a decade of rapid growth for Portage la Prairie, as many more settlers moved to town establishing farms and opening new businesses. By this time, the village had an operating flour mill, a local newspaper, and a community fair; just to name a few of Portage's highlights. From the 1870s to the 1880s, the community increased in population by approximately 10 times (from 300 to 3,000). Freight and supplies were transported by oxcart and steamboat until the arrival of the Canadian Pacific Railway (CPR) in 1881, the year after Portage was incorporated as a town. Thomas Collins was the first mayor of Portage la Prairie.

In 1907, Portage was incorporated as a city, and from that point on, managed to keep a gradual rate of growth and development, serving as a regional hub for agriculture, retail, manufacturing and transportation in central Manitoba.

During World War II, the Royal Canadian Air Force constructed Canadian Forces Base Portage la Prairie in support of the British Commonwealth Air Training Plan. The station was controlled by the RCAF but used naval personnel as high-frequency direction finding operators. The station's priority was German U-boat traffic. This site and CFB Rivers located at Rivers, Manitoba helped to increase the fix accuracy immensely.

Commercial cultivation of industrial cannabis was banned in Canada in 1938. In 1928, 1,640 acres (660 ha) of industrial hemp was grown in Canada, with 1,200 acres (490 ha) of that being in Portage la Prairie.

== Geography ==
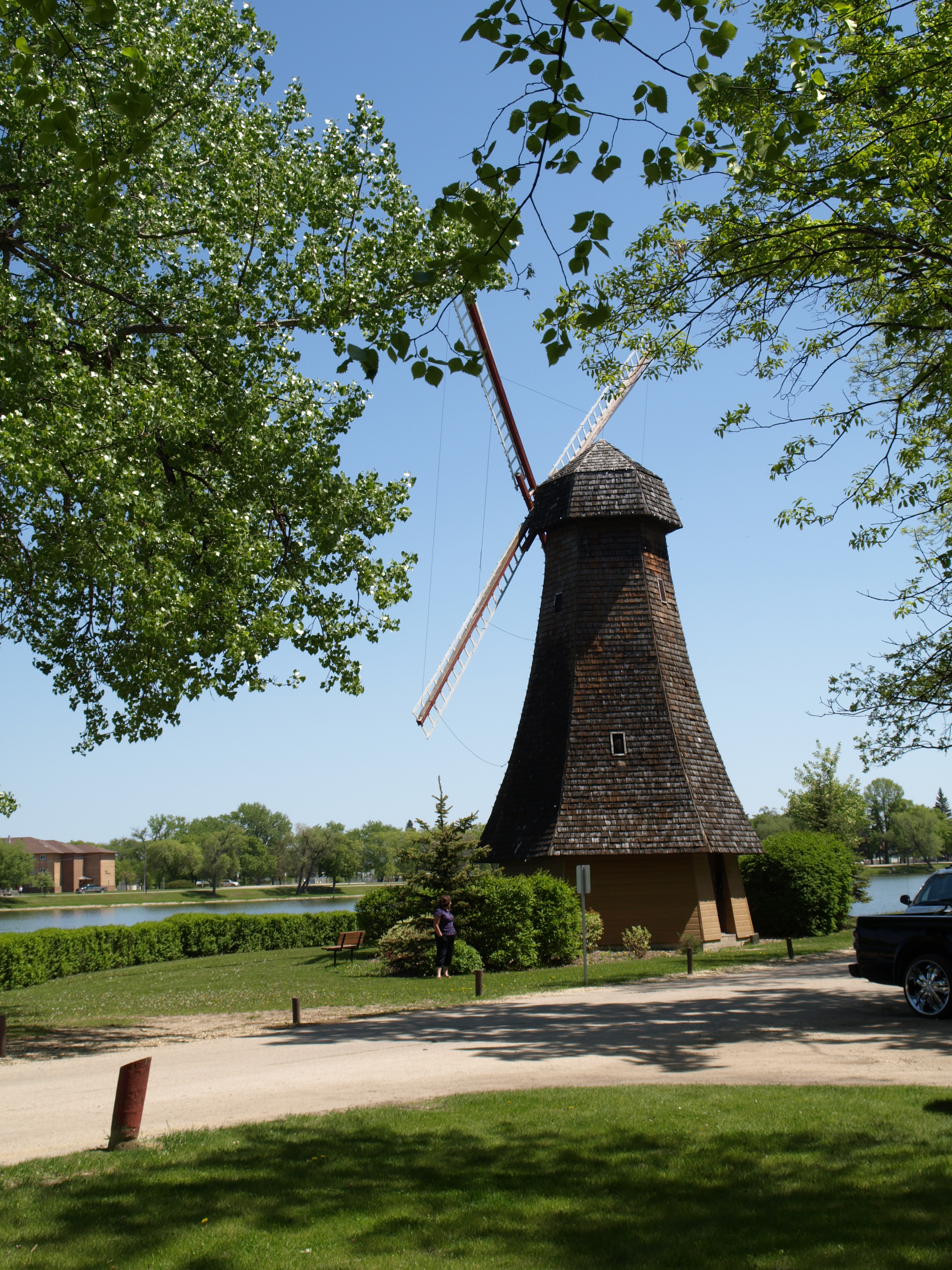
Portage la Prairie, Manitoba

The city became a major transportation centre due to its proximity to the river, and later, the location of the main lines of the country's national railways passing through the community. The CPR and Canadian National Railways (CNR) intersect in Portage; one of the few places in Canada where the two railways meet. This has made Portage la Prairie one of the most ideal places for railway aficionados to view trains; approximately 72 trains pass through the city each day. The Trans-Canada Highway, a major national transportation route, runs past the city and provides the community with business if highway travellers decide to make a trek into Portage.

The post-glacial flood plain surrounding Portage la Prairie is highly fertile, with rich, clay-loam soils abundant in nutrients. Portage la Prairie is therefore a major agricultural centre in Manitoba, and in Canada. The rural land surrounding the community is a breadbasket in North America, boasting some of the best soils on the continent for the production of a wide array of vegetables, berries, grains, and lentils.

The city has an aggressive tree-planting program and is known for its mature urban forest. A collection of some of the largest cottonwood trees in Canada line the west end of the main street known as Saskatchewan Avenue (as well as Crescent Road which runs adjacent to Crescent Lake), and, along with many other species like Manitoba maple, bur oak and green ash, are present throughout the city.

It is the home of former Prime Minister of Canada Arthur Meighen; a school and an avenue are named in his honour.

=== Climate ===
According to Environment Canada, Portage la Prairie has the most sunny days during the warm months in Canada. Portage has a humid continental climate (Köppen climate classification Dfb, United States Department of Agriculture, Plant Hardiness Zone 3a) with warm summers and very cold, dry winters. The highest temperature ever recorded in Portage La Prairie was 41.1 °C (106 °F) on 11 July 1936. The coldest temperature ever recorded was −44.0 °C (−47.2 °F) on 2 February 1996.

Climate data for Portage la Prairie, 1981–2010 normals, extremes 1886–present (Note: Climate data was recorded in Portage La Prairie from January 1886 to August 1996, and at the Portage Southport auto station from December 1992 to present.)
| Month | Jan | Feb | Mar | Apr | May | Jun | Jul | Aug | Sep | Oct | Nov | Dec | Year |
|---|---|---|---|---|---|---|---|---|---|---|---|---|---|
| Record high °C (°F) | 10.3 (50.5) | 14.4 (57.9) | 25.0 (77.0) | 35.0 (95.0) | 37.5 (99.5) | 38.9 (102.0) | 41.1 (106.0) | 40.0 (104.0) | 40.0 (104.0) | 32.8 (91.0) | 22.8 (73.0) | 12.8 (55.0) | 41.1 (106.0) |
| Mean daily maximum °C (°F) | −10.6 (12.9) | −7.2 (19.0) | −0.7 (30.7) | 9.9 (49.8) | 18.8 (65.8) | 23.2 (73.8) | 25.4 (77.7) | 25.0 (77.0) | 18.3 (64.9) | 10.5 (50.9) | −0.8 (30.6) | −9.0 (15.8) | 8.6 (47.5) |
| Daily mean °C (°F) | −16.0 (3.2) | −12.7 (9.1) | −5.7 (21.7) | 3.7 (38.7) | 11.6 (52.9) | 17.0 (62.6) | 19.2 (66.6) | 18.4 (65.1) | 12.1 (53.8) | 5.1 (41.2) | −5.1 (22.8) | −13.8 (7.2) | 2.8 (37.0) |
| Mean daily minimum °C (°F) | −21.4 (−6.5) | −18.2 (−0.8) | −10.7 (12.7) | −2.5 (27.5) | 4.4 (39.9) | 10.7 (51.3) | 13.0 (55.4) | 11.6 (52.9) | 5.8 (42.4) | −0.3 (31.5) | −9.5 (14.9) | −18.5 (−1.3) | −3.0 (26.6) |
| Record low °C (°F) | −42.0 (−43.6) | −44.0 (−47.2) | −37.8 (−36.0) | −25.6 (−14.1) | −12.8 (9.0) | −3.9 (25.0) | 0.0 (32.0) | −1.7 (28.9) | −7.2 (19.0) | −21.1 (−6.0) | −36.0 (−32.8) | −39.0 (−38.2) | −44.0 (−47.2) |
| Average precipitation mm (inches) | 22.6 (0.89) | 14.9 (0.59) | 26.2 (1.03) | 25.4 (1.00) | 42.9 (1.69) | 82.4 (3.24) | 80.0 (3.15) | 74.0 (2.91) | 57.0 (2.24) | 45.8 (1.80) | 28.9 (1.14) | 26.5 (1.04) | 526.5 (20.73) |
| Average rainfall mm (inches) | 0.3 (0.01) | 0.1 (0.00) | 10.0 (0.39) | 16.0 (0.63) | 40.7 (1.60) | 82.4 (3.24) | 80.0 (3.15) | 74.0 (2.91) | 56.3 (2.22) | 38.8 (1.53) | 6.8 (0.27) | 2.0 (0.08) | 407.4 (16.04) |
| Average snowfall cm (inches) | 22.3 (8.8) | 14.8 (5.8) | 16.2 (6.4) | 9.4 (3.7) | 2.2 (0.9) | 0.0 (0.0) | 0.0 (0.0) | 0.0 (0.0) | 0.7 (0.3) | 6.9 (2.7) | 22.1 (8.7) | 24.5 (9.6) | 119.1 (46.9) |
| Average precipitation days (≥ 0.2 mm) | 9.5 | 5.4 | 5.6 | 5.4 | 8.6 | 10.7 | 10.6 | 9.1 | 9.2 | 8.5 | 6.3 | 8.8 | 97.7 |
| Average rainy days (≥ 0.2 mm) | 0.1 | 0.1 | 1.7 | 3.7 | 8.3 | 10.7 | 10.6 | 9.1 | 9.1 | 7.2 | 1.6 | 0.3 | 62.5 |
| Average snowy days (≥ 0.2 cm) | 9.7 | 5.3 | 4.4 | 2.1 | 0.4 | 0.0 | 0.0 | 0.0 | 0.2 | 1.6 | 4.9 | 8.5 | 37.2 |
Source: Environment Canada

Climate data for Southport Airport, 1981–2010 normals, extremes 1941–1992 (Note: Daily high and low temperatures and precipitation totals were recorded from July 1941 to June 1992. Since July 1992, only hourly weather observations are reported from Southport Airport.)
| Month | Jan | Feb | Mar | Apr | May | Jun | Jul | Aug | Sep | Oct | Nov | Dec | Year |
|---|---|---|---|---|---|---|---|---|---|---|---|---|---|
| Record high humidex | 8.1 | 11.7 | 18.9 | 34.3 | 40.6 | 49.3 | 49.7 | 46.8 | 44.1 | 31.7 | 22.8 | 12.8 | 49.7 |
| Record high °C (°F) | 11.1 (52.0) | 12.2 (54.0) | 19.4 (66.9) | 34.8 (94.6) | 37.8 (100.0) | 37.3 (99.1) | 37.2 (99.0) | 40.2 (104.4) | 37.8 (100.0) | 30.0 (86.0) | 22.8 (73.0) | 13.9 (57.0) | 40.2 (104.4) |
| Mean daily maximum °C (°F) | −9.0 (15.8) | −6.2 (20.8) | 0.3 (32.5) | 11.1 (52.0) | 19.4 (66.9) | 23.3 (73.9) | 26.5 (79.7) | 25.9 (78.6) | 18.5 (65.3) | 10.7 (51.3) | −0.5 (31.1) | −8.6 (16.5) | 9.3 (48.7) |
| Daily mean °C (°F) | −14.3 (6.3) | −11.3 (11.7) | −4.6 (23.7) | 4.8 (40.6) | 12.4 (54.3) | 17.1 (62.8) | 20.3 (68.5) | 19.2 (66.6) | 12.4 (54.3) | 5.2 (41.4) | −4.9 (23.2) | −13.3 (8.1) | 3.6 (38.5) |
| Mean daily minimum °C (°F) | −19.6 (−3.3) | −16.5 (2.3) | −9.5 (14.9) | −1.5 (29.3) | 5.3 (41.5) | 10.7 (51.3) | 14.0 (57.2) | 12.5 (54.5) | 6.4 (43.5) | −0.3 (31.5) | −9.3 (15.3) | −17.9 (−0.2) | −2.2 (28.0) |
| Record low °C (°F) | −41.1 (−42.0) | −42.2 (−44.0) | −34.4 (−29.9) | −23.3 (−9.9) | −12.8 (9.0) | −1.7 (28.9) | 2.2 (36.0) | 0.6 (33.1) | −6.7 (19.9) | −20.1 (−4.2) | −34.5 (−30.1) | −37.2 (−35.0) | −42.2 (−44.0) |
| Record low wind chill | −54.0 | −54.6 | −48.2 | −31.7 | −19.3 | −5.1 | 0.0 | 0.0 | −10.8 | −27.2 | −43.1 | −52.1 | −54.6 |
| Average precipitation mm (inches) | 17.7 (0.70) | 13.5 (0.53) | 25.3 (1.00) | 29.4 (1.16) | 44.5 (1.75) | 82.9 (3.26) | 76.6 (3.02) | 64.4 (2.54) | 59.4 (2.34) | 44.4 (1.75) | 21.5 (0.85) | 20.4 (0.80) | 500.0 (19.69) |
| Average rainfall mm (inches) | 0.5 (0.02) | 0.3 (0.01) | 8.7 (0.34) | 18.4 (0.72) | 41.3 (1.63) | 82.9 (3.26) | 76.6 (3.02) | 64.4 (2.54) | 57.2 (2.25) | 34.4 (1.35) | 6.5 (0.26) | 3.2 (0.13) | 394.3 (15.52) |
| Average snowfall cm (inches) | 28.0 (11.0) | 20.0 (7.9) | 20.0 (7.9) | 13.0 (5.1) | 3.2 (1.3) | 0.0 (0.0) | 0.0 (0.0) | 0.0 (0.0) | 2.2 (0.9) | 12.8 (5.0) | 22.3 (8.8) | 27.8 (10.9) | 149.3 (58.8) |
| Average precipitation days (≥ 0.2 mm) | 11.3 | 7.3 | 8.3 | 7.0 | 10.1 | 13.7 | 11.9 | 10.6 | 11.4 | 11.5 | 8.9 | 10.0 | 122.0 |
| Average rainy days (≥ 0.2 mm) | 0.8 | 0.3 | 2.8 | 5.0 | 9.7 | 13.7 | 11.9 | 10.6 | 11.1 | 9.0 | 2.7 | 0.7 | 78.4 |
| Average snowy days (≥ 0.2 cm) | 12.1 | 8.6 | 7.0 | 2.9 | 0.8 | 0.0 | 0.0 | 0.0 | 0.5 | 3.7 | 7.1 | 11.0 | 53.7 |
| Average relative humidity (%) | 69.7 | 68.2 | 65.6 | 48.7 | 44.4 | 50.5 | 52.2 | 48.3 | 52.5 | 56.3 | 67.3 | 69.7 | 57.8 |
Source: Environment Canada

Climate data for Portage la Prairie CDA (Note: Portage la Prairie CDA is located at 49°57′00″N 098°16′01″W, just east of the city and only records precipitation and snow depth.)
| Month | Jan | Feb | Mar | Apr | May | Jun | Jul | Aug | Sep | Oct | Nov | Dec | Year |
|---|---|---|---|---|---|---|---|---|---|---|---|---|---|
| Average precipitation mm (inches) | 21.3 (0.84) | 16.2 (0.64) | 25.7 (1.01) | 28.3 (1.11) | 58.4 (2.30) | 90.0 (3.54) | 78.4 (3.09) | 68.3 (2.69) | 50.1 (1.97) | 43.2 (1.70) | 25.8 (1.02) | 26.8 (1.06) | 532.4 (20.96) |
| Average rainfall mm (inches) | 0.7 (0.03) | 1.7 (0.07) | 11.1 (0.44) | 17.6 (0.69) | 54.4 (2.14) | 90.0 (3.54) | 78.4 (3.09) | 68.3 (2.69) | 49.8 (1.96) | 35.5 (1.40) | 6.7 (0.26) | 1.5 (0.06) | 415.6 (16.36) |
| Average snowfall cm (inches) | 21.5 (8.5) | 14.9 (5.9) | 14.9 (5.9) | 10.8 (4.3) | 4.0 (1.6) | 0.0 (0.0) | 0.0 (0.0) | 0.0 (0.0) | 0.3 (0.1) | 7.7 (3.0) | 19.1 (7.5) | 25.3 (10.0) | 118.5 (46.7) |
| Average precipitation days (≥ 0.2 mm) | 7.9 | 5.8 | 6.3 | 5.1 | 8.6 | 11.4 | 9.1 | 8.9 | 8.7 | 7.2 | 6.3 | 7.5 | 92.8 |
| Average rainy days (≥ 0.2 mm) | 0.3 | 0.7 | 2.0 | 3.4 | 8.2 | 11.4 | 9.1 | 8.9 | 8.6 | 5.7 | 1.5 | 0.5 | 60.2 |
| Average snowy days (≥ 0.2 cm) | 7.7 | 5.4 | 4.7 | 2.0 | 0.6 | 0.0 | 0.0 | 0.0 | 0.1 | 1.7 | 5.1 | 7.2 | 34.4 |
Source: Environment Canada Canadian Climate Normals 1981–2010

== Demographics ==
Historical populations
| Year | Pop. | ±% |
|---|---|---|
| 1891 | 3,363 | — |
| 1901 | 3,901 | +16.0% |
| 1911 | 5,892 | +51.0% |
| 1921 | 6,766 | +14.8% |
| 1931 | 6,597 | −2.5% |
| 1941 | 7,095 | +7.5% |
| 1951 | 8,511 | +20.0% |
| 1961 | 12,388 | +45.6% |
| 1971 | 12,950 | +4.5% |
| 1981 | 13,086 | +1.1% |
| 1991 | 13,186 | +0.8% |
| 2001 | 12,976 | −1.6% |
| 2006 | 12,728 | −1.9% |
| 2011 | 12,996 | +2.1% |
| 2016 | 13,304 | +2.4% |
| 2021 | 13,270 | −0.3% |

In the 2021 Census of Population conducted by Statistics Canada, Portage la Prairie had a population of 13,270 living in 5,644 of its 6,109 total private dwellings, a change of −0.3% from its 2016 population of 13,304. With a land area of 24.72 km^{2} (9.54 sq mi), it had a population density of 536.8/km^{2} (1,390.3/sq mi) in 2021.

According to the 2016 Census, Portage la Prairie had 5,794 private dwellings, 5,576 which were occupied (96.2% occupancy rate). The median value of a dwelling is $150,297 in Portage la Prairie, almost half as low as the national median at $280,552. The average household has 2.3 people and the average family has 1.1 children. The median (after-tax) household income in the area is $46,963, lower than the national rate at $54,089. The median age of Portage la Prairie is 40.8, essentially par with the national median at 40.6 years old.

The census also reports that 89.9% of the residents' mother tongue was English, followed by French (2.5%) and German (2.5%).

=== Ethnicity ===
Portage la Prairie is almost exclusively inhabited by people of Indigenous or European ancestry (89.6%).

Panethnic groups in the City of Portage La Prairie (2001−2021)
| Panethnic group | 2021 | | 2016 | | 2011 | | 2006 | | 2001 | |
| Panethnic group | Pop. | % | Pop. | % | Pop. | % | Pop. | % | Pop. | % |
|---|---|---|---|---|---|---|---|---|---|---|
| European (Note: Statistic includes all persons that did not make up part of a visible minority or an indigenous identity.) | 7,760 | 60.46% | 8,125 | 63.65% | 9,200 | 74.22% | 9,295 | 76.75% | 9,715 | 79.7% |
| Indigenous | 3,735 | 29.1% | 3,990 | 31.26% | 2,845 | 22.95% | 2,580 | 21.3% | 2,330 | 19.11% |
| South Asian | 575 | 4.48% | 205 | 1.61% | 80 | 0.65% | 0 | 0% | 0 | 0% |
| Southeast Asian (Note: Statistic includes total responses of "Filipino" and "Southeast Asian" under visible minority section on census.) | 425 | 3.31% | 250 | 1.96% | 140 | 1.13% | 55 | 0.45% | 70 | 0.57% |
| African | 190 | 1.48% | 70 | 0.55% | 60 | 0.48% | 125 | 1.03% | 30 | 0.25% |
| Latin American | 70 | 0.55% | 35 | 0.27% | 35 | 0.28% | 0 | 0% | 15 | 0.12% |
| East Asian (Note: Statistic includes total responses of "Chinese", "Korean", and "Japanese" under visible minority section on census.) | 35 | 0.27% | 70 | 0.55% | 0 | 0% | 50 | 0.41% | 30 | 0.25% |
| Middle Eastern (Note: Statistic includes total responses of "West Asian" and "Arab" under visible minority section on census.) | 0 | 0% | 0 | 0% | 15 | 0.12% | 0 | 0% | 0 | 0% |
| Other/multiracial (Note: Statistic includes total responses of "Visible minority, n.i.e." and "Multiple visible minorities" under visible minority section on census.) | 30 | 0.23% | 10 | 0.08% | 0 | 0% | 20 | 0.17% | 0 | 0% |
| Total responses | 12,835 | 96.72% | 12,765 | 95.95% | 12,395 | 95.38% | 12,110 | 95.14% | 12,190 | 93.94% |
| Total population | 13,270 | 100% | 13,304 | 100% | 12,996 | 100% | 12,728 | 100% | 12,976 | 100% |
Note: Totals greater than 100% due to multiple origin responses

=== Religion ===
Religiously speaking, most of the residents either practise a form of Christianity (66.4%) or have no religious affiliation (30.9%). 1.7% of the population practise a form of traditional Indigenous spirituality.

== Education ==
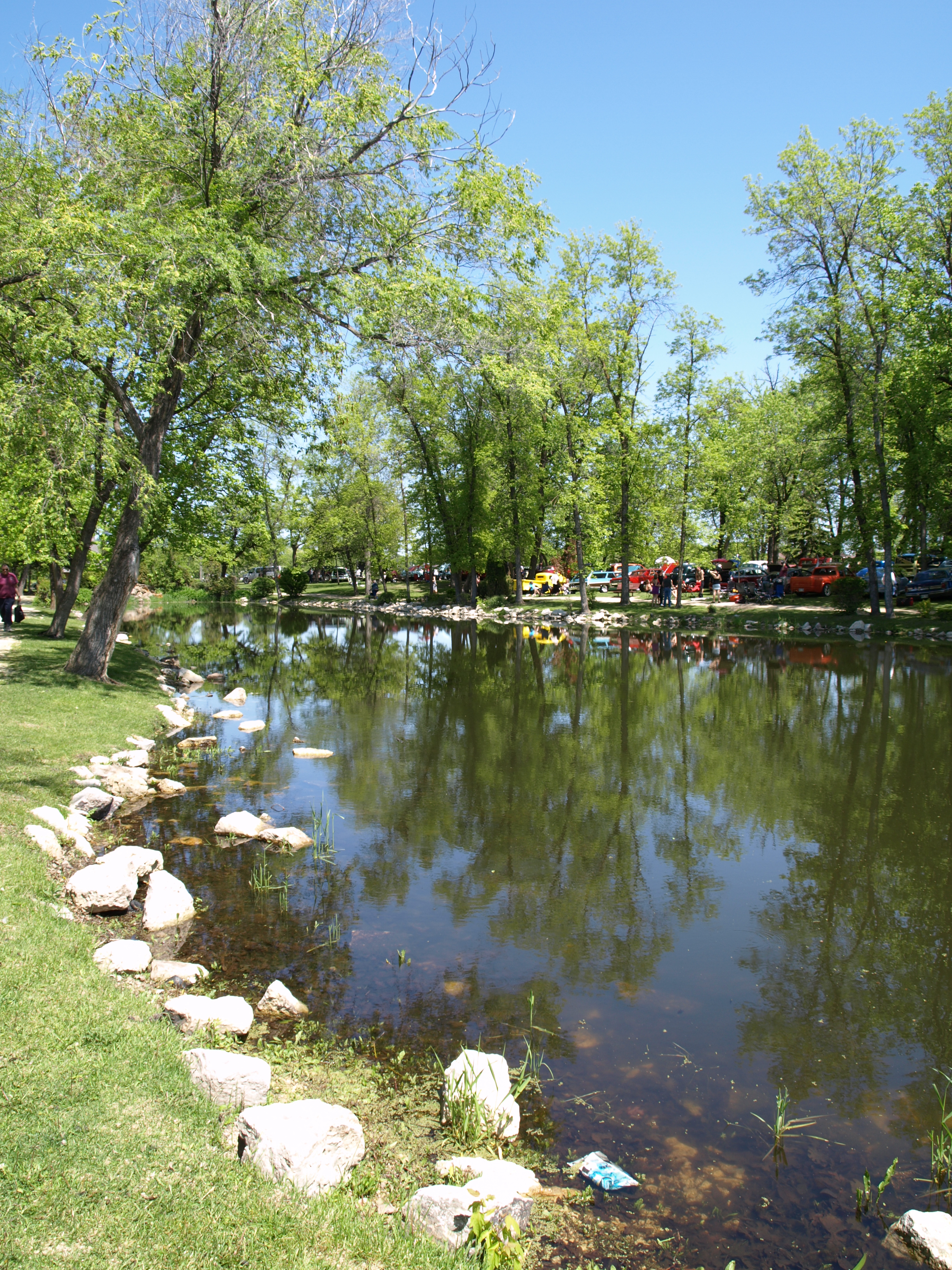
Portage la Prairie

Public education falls under the Portage la Prairie School Division.

=== Public schools ===
- École Arthur Meighen School
- École Crescentview School
- Fort la Reine School
- Hutterian Schools
- La Verendrye School
- North Memorial School
- Oakville School
- Portage Collegiate Institute
- Yellowquill School

=== Private schools ===
- Westpark School
- Solid Rock Ministries Christian School

=== Post-secondary schools ===
- Portage Campus of the Red River College

=== Other ===
Portage Learning & Literacy Centre

== Transportation ==
Portage la Prairie railway station is served by Via Rail with both the Canadian and Winnipeg – Churchill trains calling at the station.

The Portage la Prairie Canadian Pacific Railway Station no longer receives passenger rail service, and is operated as a museum.

The Portage la Prairie Southport Airport is a former air force base and the primary airport in the city. The Portage la Prairie (North) Airport is also near Portage la Prairie and consists of a grass field.

Rider Express operates an intercity bus route from Winnipeg to Regina once a week.

For road travellers, the city is served by the Manitoba Highway 1, part of the Trans-Canada Highway.

== Local media ==
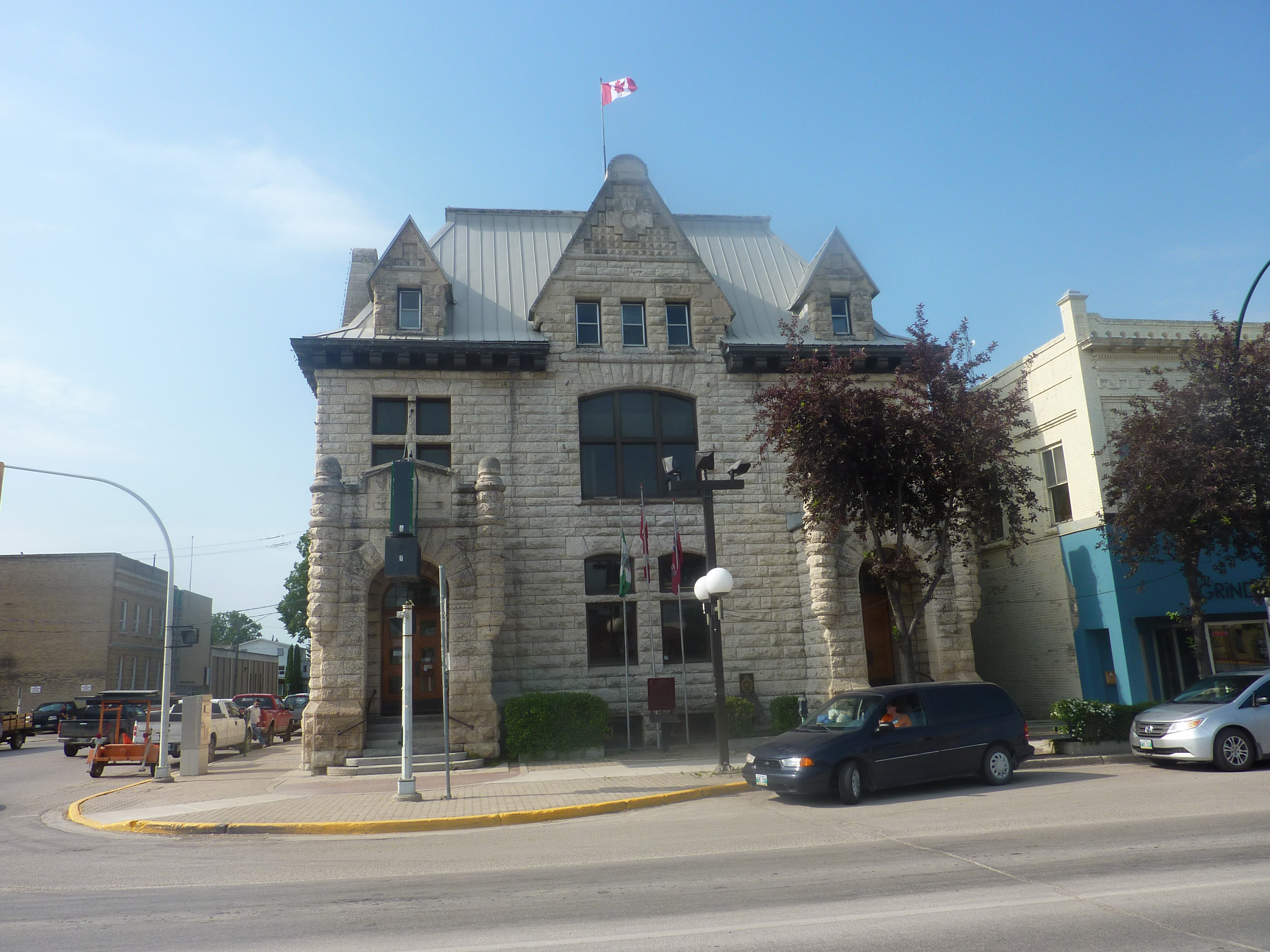
Portage la Prairie Public Building

Newspapers

- Weekly newspaper (local), The Graphic Leader
- Weekly newspaper (regional), The Headliner
- The Winnipeg Free Press and Winnipeg Sun are also available.

Radio

- CFRY (AM) 920 – country music, owned by Golden West Broadcasting
- CHPO-FM 93.1 – country music, owned by Golden West Broadcasting
- CJPG-FM 96.5 – classic hits, owned by Golden West Broadcasting

Television

Portage la Prairie receives all television stations from nearby Winnipeg. CHMI-DT channel 13, affiliated with Citytv, is licensed to Portage la Prairie, with studios in downtown Winnipeg.

Cable television is also available through MTS Ultimate TV and Shaw Cable systems.

Online Media

- Portage Online, owned by Golden West Broadcasting
- The Portage Citizen
- PCI Channel 1 [local high school news outlet]

== Arts and culture ==
=== Museums ===
Fort la Reine Museum is a heritage museum and Manitoba Star Attraction located on the east end of Portage, operational since Canada's Centennial in 1967. Today, the museum is home to an array of buildings from Portage and the surrounding region, and covers cultural and natural prairie history (local and regional) from the 18th century (the period of French exploration) to the present day. There are 25 buildings open to the public, each containing tens or even hundreds of artifacts, on display in an immersive history format.

Some of the highlights of the museum include a replica of the historic Fort la Reine and Hudson's Bay Company York Boat; a railway caboose and the 1882 official rail car of Sir William Cornelius Van Horne, builder of the Canadian Pacific Railway; a fully restored Ukrainian Pioneer Church; a number of houses that are more than 100 years old; a firehall with a fully restored 1931 Seagrave Fire Truck; the Old Officers Mess from the now-retired Canadian Forces Base in Southport; a schoolhouse and church built in the 1880s from West Prospect (a pioneer farming community that no longer exists); and a Sioux tipi.

The museum also brings in interactive travelling exhibitions from across Canada and beyond, set up in the main gallery to educate visitors on topics covering anything from prehistoric cultures in Canada to climate change. The museum also hosts annual cultural and theatrical events, including the National Indigenous Peoples' Day celebrations, Canada Day festivities, heritage-themed tea parties, holiday celebrations, and other seasonal events.

=== Festivals and events ===
Portage la Prairie celebrates several annual events and festivals, which include the Portage Exhibition & Fair ("Portage Ex") held every July since 1872, the Portage Potato Festival which takes place in early to mid-August, Whoop & Hollar Folk Festival in late August, and the Manitoba Air Show in June at Southport (held bi-annually). Concerts in the Park is a weekly summer concert series that is held in Island Park in July and August.

=== Galleries and performing art venues ===
Heritage Square, located downtown, is an outdoor community event plaza and centre of the community's arts and culture district with murals on some of the nearby buildings. Surrounding Heritage Square are the Prairie Cinema Centre, Portage la Prairie Regional Library, and Prairie Fusion Arts & Entertainment. Prairie Fusion houses the William Glesby Theatre, a popular performing arts facility, and the Portage & District Art Gallery, featuring a new display of the works of local visual artists every month. Prairie Fusion is considered to be one of the primary cultural gathering places of Portage, and brings in many theatre, dance, and musical performances and events.

=== Film ===
Scenes for the documentary film We Were Children were shot at the former residential school in Portage la Prairie, now the Rufus Prince building.

=== Music scene ===
The punk rock band Propagandhi was formed in the city in 1986 by guitarist Chris Hannah and drummer Jord Samolesky. Award-winning Canadian country band Doc Walker also hails from the Portage la Prairie area.

== Parks and outdoor recreation ==
In central Portage la Prairie, residents and tourists can enjoy the amenities and beauty of the renowned Island Park. The sprawling city park is located on a peninsula, known as "The Island" (though not officially an island), and bounded by Crescent Lake, an ancient oxbow lake that is popular among birdwatchers, photographers, and canoeists/kayakers. Together, Crescent Lake and Island Park form one of Manitoba's most recently-designated Star Attractions. For much of the year, the lake serves as a major nesting site for flocks of migratory waterfowl, most notably the Canada goose.

Island Park features a network of walking trails, tennis courts, a large playground, picnic areas, two bandstands, a duck pond, deer sanctuary, various monuments, and an extensive arboretum. Nearby recreational opportunities include an 18-hole golf course, the Portage Fairgrounds, an outdoor water park (Splash Island), and Stride Place—home of the Portage Terriers hockey club and an indoor wave pool.

Just south of the Portage la Prairie by-pass is the Portage Spillway, where the Assiniboine River empties into the Portage Diversion. Not only does this area mark the importance of the river in Portage's history, but it is home to Portage Spillway-Wayside Provincial Park, a park that is especially popular with fishermen in the summer months. Also not far southwest lies Spruce Woods Provincial Park and not far north lies St. Ambroise Beach Provincial Park. The city is also home to kilometres of multi-use recreational trails running through the parks and forested areas, which provide an oasis for sightseers to view wildlife. Geocaching has become popular in these areas, as people are finding more innovative ways to get out hiking in this scenic urban forest.

Aside from parks, the Portage la Prairie/Central Plains Region features many established campgrounds located within a 15-30-minute drive of the city, and offers a few public beaches including Delta Beach, home to the Delta Marsh Field Station/Wildlife Reserve (part of this beach/area was destroyed due to flooding in the spring of 2011), Jackson Lake (located 2 mi (3.2 km) southeast of Sidney, Manitoba, about a 35-minute drive west of Portage la Prairie) and Twin Lakes Beach, an hour northeast of Portage, also on Lake Manitoba.

== Attractions ==
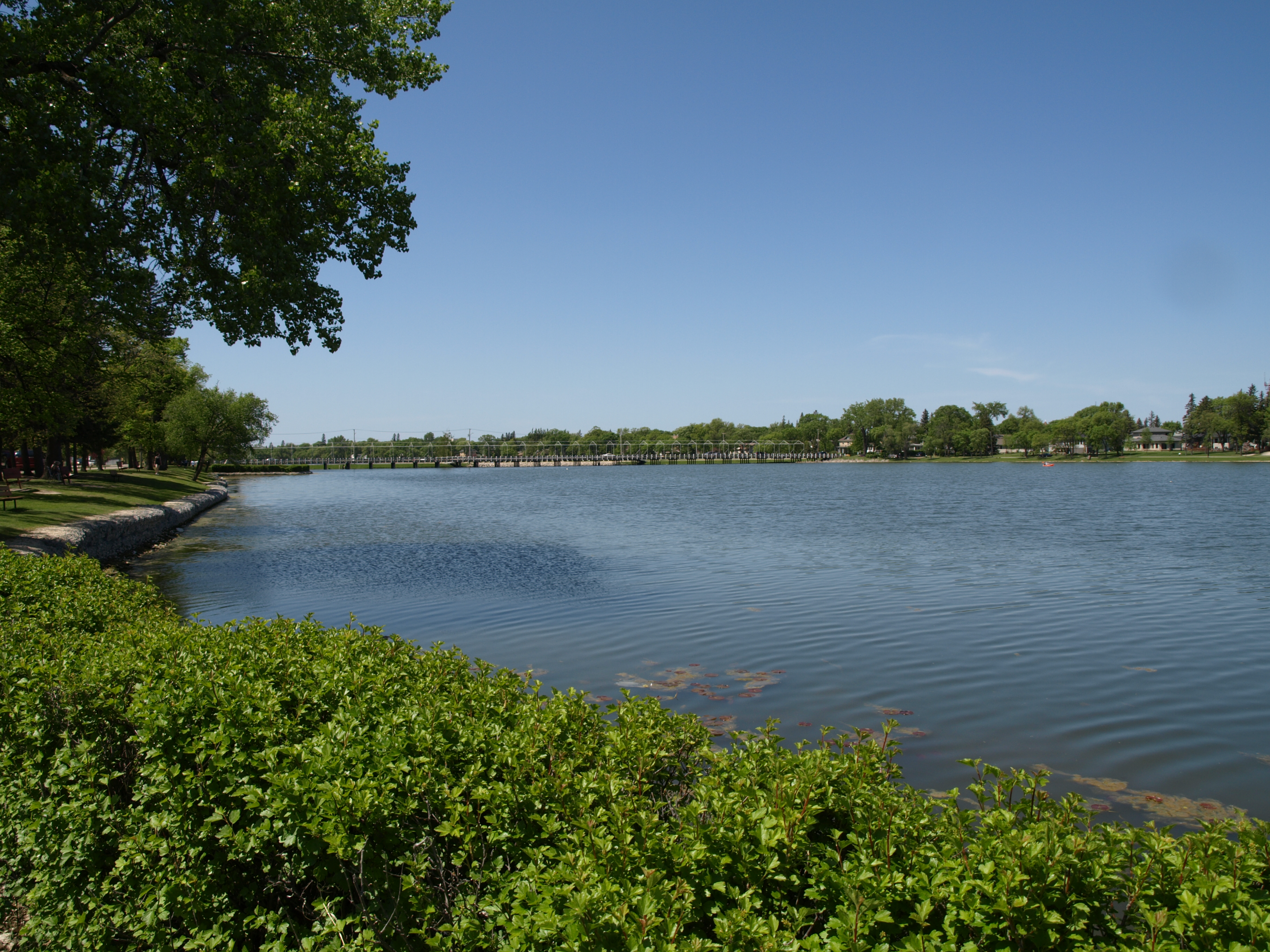
Portage la Prairie

Aside from Island Park, Fort la Reine Museum, and Prairie Fusion Arts & Entertainment (William Glesby Theatre), Portage la Prairie is home to a variety of other attractions to visit, including:

One of Portage la Prairie's most popular attractions, the Community Walkway, which parallels Crescent Lake's waterfront, is a 5.2 km (3.2 mi), multi-use trail used for walking, bicycling, skateboarding and rollerblading, running past many grand heritage homes and the tranquil, picturesque sites along the lake.

The World's Largest Coca-Cola Can has also put Portage on the map and can be seen from the Trans-Canada Highway by-pass. It was constructed from an old water tower and is now located at the city's west end between the local Canadian Tire and Canad Inns hotel on Saskatchewan Avenue West.

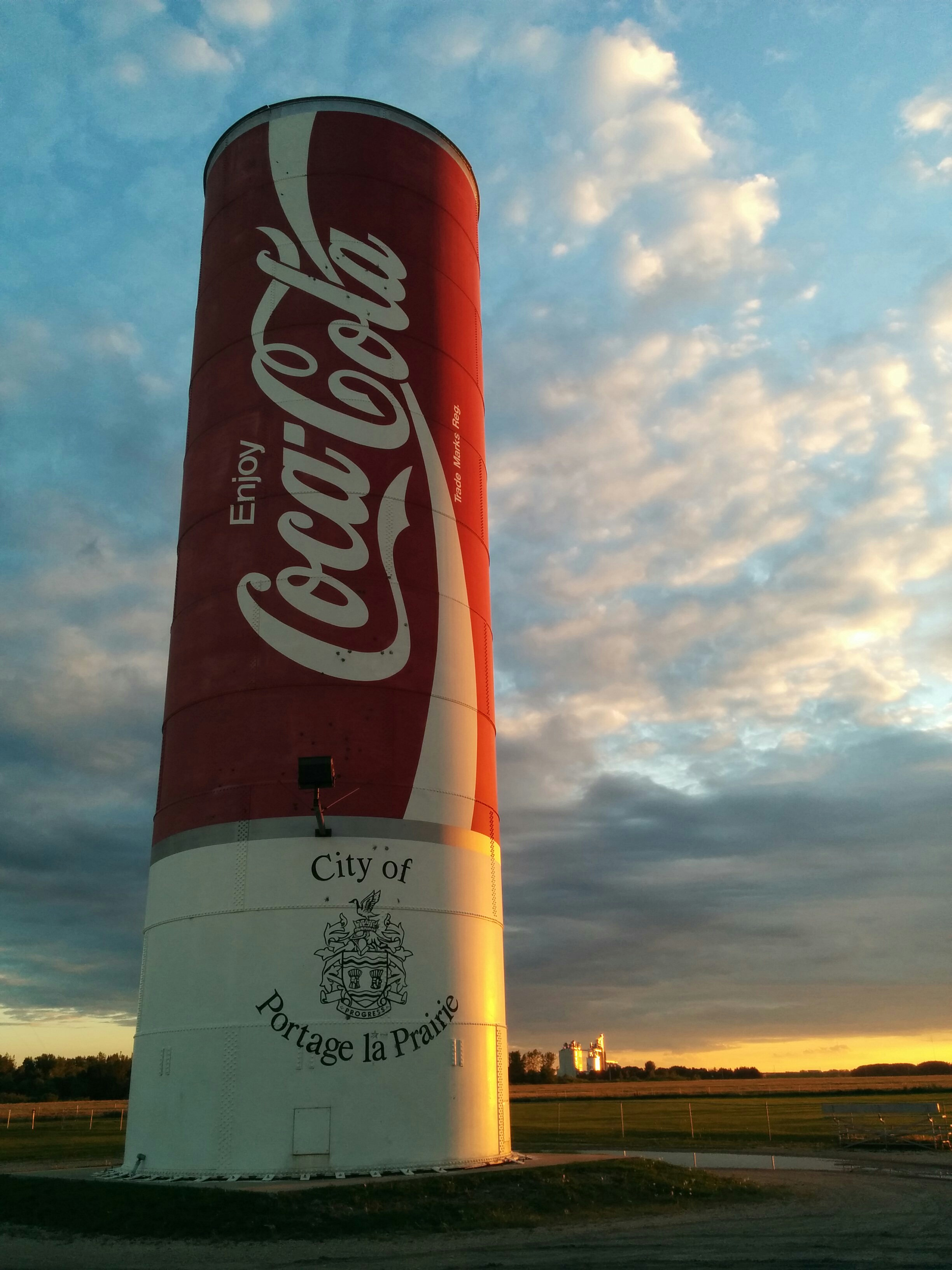
Portage la Prairie is home to the world's largest Coke can, formerly a water tower.

Stride Place, formerly the PCU Centre, opened in February 2010 and features two National Hockey League regulation-size indoor arenas, one with seating capacity for 1,680, an indoor waterpark, fitness centre, and conference/event facilities. During the winter months, the Stride Place atrium is also home to the Portage Farmers' Market (taking place at various outdoor locations in the summertime). The BDO Centre for the Community is another local arena in the city's north end, used predominantly for youth and children's activities like hockey and ringette practice.

Portage la Prairie's City Hall is a limestone structure that was designed by Thomas Fuller, who also designed the Parliament Buildings in Ottawa. It was opened in 1898 as a Dominion Post Office and became City Hall in 1960. The building was declared a historical site in 1986. On the roof is a large, 1,000-pound bell that tolls for a few seconds daily at 9:00 am, noon, and 6:00 pm.

Portage la Prairie is also home to many other heritage buildings, some of greater architectural significance than others, highlighted on a historical walking tour organized by the city's Heritage Advisory Committee. St. Mary's la Prairie Anglican Church, first established in 1854 with its current sanctuary erected in 1898, is located downtown. Saskatchewan Avenue (the city's main thoroughfare) is home to several historical structures, as well as Tupper Street and Royal Road (named after the Royal Visit of Queen Elizabeth The Queen Mother and King George VI in 1939). Crescent Road, which follows Crescent Lake for over 5 kilometres, is lined with many large, grand heritage homes dating back to the late 19th century and early 20th century.

Portage's largest hotel, part of Canad-Inns, is located in the west end of the city. This hotel includes the rink of the Portage Curling Club, Aalto's Garden Cafe, a pub known as Tavern United, and many banquet halls.

The community of Southport, located about 5 km (3.1 mi) south of Portage la Prairie, is home to the Southport Recplex featuring a fitness centre with a rock-climbing wall, gymnasium, and 5-pin bowling alley; aside from the military/air force history throughout the town and airport.

== Military ==
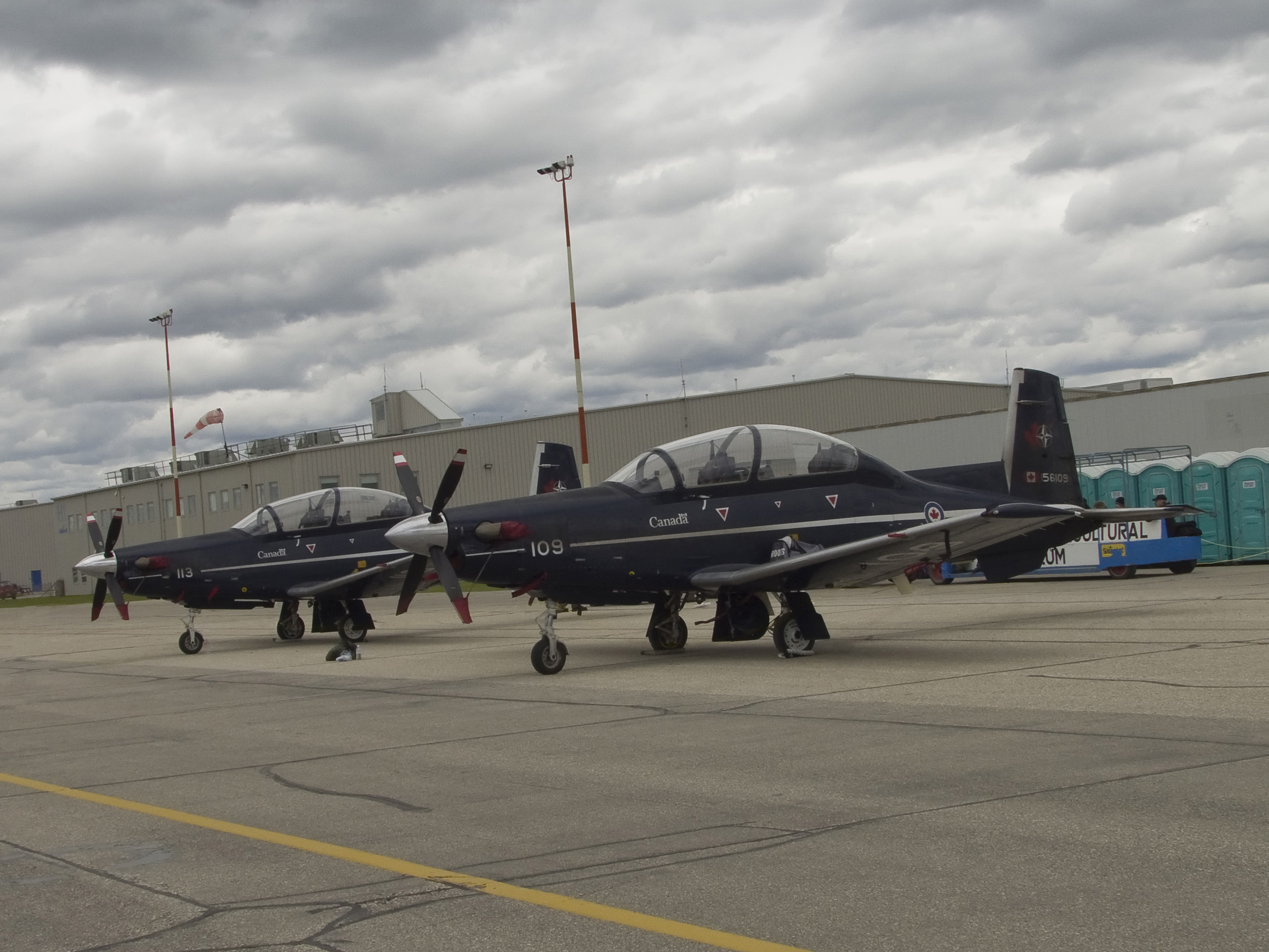
CT-156 Harvard II trainers at the airshow

Portage la Prairie had a military airbase south of the community known as Canadian Forces Base Portage la Prairie, now 3 Canadian Forces Flying Training School. It was established as part of the British Commonwealth Air Training Plan during the Second World War and trained thousands of pilots for military service from around the world.

In 1990, the federal government transferred the assets of the property to Southport Aerospace Centre Inc., a not-for-profit property management and development company whose goal was to successfully manage the site. Royal Canadian Air Force pilot training continues at 3 Canadian Forces Flying Training School under private contract at Southport.

The 13th Field Battery of the 26th Field Artillery Regiment, Royal Canadian Artillery is based out of Portage la Prairie.

During the Second World War an Algerine-class minesweeper commissioned into the Royal Canadian Navy was named after Portage la Prairie. The Portage was active during the war as an escort and later as a training vessel. As part of the 100th Anniversary of the Royal Canadian Navy, in 2010, the Navy provided the city with a display on the ship that is located in City Hall.

== Economy ==
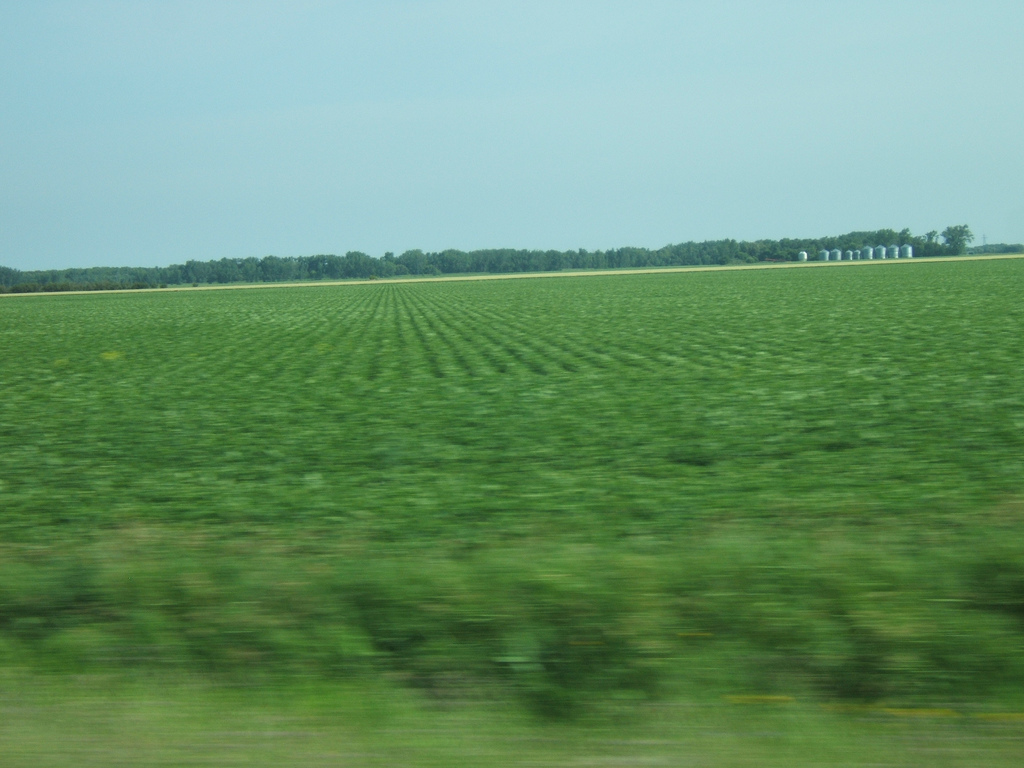
A field outside Portage la Prairie

The local economy is largely dependent on agriculture and supporting industries (trucking, transportation, chemical/fertilizer, farm machinery dealerships, etc.). Portage la Prairie is also home to the McCain Foods and Simplot potato processing plants, which provide French fries for McDonald's, Wendy's, and various other commercialized restaurant chains. Viterra, owned by Glencore Xstrata and previously known as Can-oat milling, one of the largest oat mills in the world, and is now owned by Richardson International, is also located in the municipality. McMillan Industrial Park, located on the eastern fringes of Portage, also plays a major role in the city's economy. Numerous industries including food science labs and food processing facilities, construction companies, and manufacturing sectors are located in this expanding industrial area, beneficial for the creation of jobs in the community.

The city has developed into a regional retail service centre as large big box style stores began to operate on the west end of the city in 2007. The west end will continue to see future development with new retail outlets lined up. Many small towns and Native reserves use this as their primary shopping destination. Since Portage la Prairie is a commercial hub for the Central Plains Area, it serves some 50,000 people living within an approximately 50 km radius.

Portage la Prairie is a farming city, with an average of 122 frost free days, and a USDA Plant Hardiness Zone of 3a. Agriculture is the city's main industry.

== Government ==
The city is governed by a mayor and six councillors. Elected in October 2022, the current mayor is Sharilyn Knox, who previously served four years on City Council. She is Portage la Prairie's 42nd mayor and the second woman to hold office in the city.

Jeff Bereza, Progressive Conservative Party of Manitoba, was elected to the Legislative Assembly of Manitoba in 2023 to represent the Portage la Prairie provincial electoral district, following in the footsteps of long-time Portage Member of the Legislative Assembly (MLA) Ian Wishart.

Conservative Party member Branden Leslie was elected to the Parliament of Canada in 2023 to represent the Portage—Lisgar riding, during a by-election held following the resignation of long-time Member of Parliament (MP) Candice Bergen.

=== City issues ===
Various new residential developments and an upsurge in renovating older homes is contributing to the improvement of housing stock in the community. All of these new housing developments are occurring on the south side of the town, on or near Crescent Lake and Garrioch Creek.

Flooding also poses an occasional problem in the rural area of Portage la Prairie, especially during the spring.

In 2010, MoneySense, as part of MSN's news site, rated Portage la Prairie in a tie for Canada's worst city to live in, with relation to population decline, but at the same time was ranked the 69th, out of 180 cities, best place to live in Canada. According to the 2012 MoneySense statistics, a series of polls in a number of different areas that relate to the benefits of living in a city, rated Portage la Prairie as the 49th best city, up from 60th in 2011, to live in overall (out of 190 Canadian communities), in Canada, and the 8th best in its population group. This is due to community revitalization programs and measures that have been taken to promote growth and industry, safety, culture, infrastructure, etc., which have significantly contributed to the growth, prosperity and strengthening economy of the community.

== Sports ==
Portage la Prairie is home to the Portage Terriers, who play in the Manitoba Junior Hockey League, and the Central Plains Capitals, who play in the Manitoba Midget 'AAA' and Manitoba Female Midget Hockey Leagues. In the 2014/2015 season, the Portage Terriers had a regular season record of 53 wins, 4 losses and 3 ties and had the best hockey record/winning percentage in the world. In that season, they also won the Turnbull Cup as champions of the Manitoba Junior Hockey League and hosted the RBC Cup for the National Junior A Championship, which they also won.

Stride Place is the city's main recreation facility and houses two arenas, an aquatic centre, a fitness centre, and indoor walking track. Outdoor sports facilities are located at the Republic of Manitobah Park. The Portage Centennial Arena (now called the BDO Centre for the Community) shared hosting duties of the 1999 World Junior Ice Hockey Championships with Winnipeg, Morden and Selkirk. The city, along with Winnipeg, also hosted the 2011 World U-17 Hockey Challenge. In 2015, the city played host to the Royal Bank Cup, Canada's national junior hockey championship, which was won by the host Terriers. Several sports films have been shot at Stride Place, including Goon and The Wrath of Grapes: The Don Cherry Story II.

The Uniroyal/Goodrich World Junior Curling Championships were held at the Portage Curling Club in 1990. Canadian women skipped by Cathy Overton-Clapham, won bronze and the men skipped by Dean Joanisse came fourth. The Portage Curling Club has twice played host to the Canadian Senior Curling Championships. As part of the 2012–13 World Curling Tour the city hosted the 2012 Canad Inns Prairie Classic which was won by Kevin Koe. In the same year the 2012 Manitoba Scotties Tournament of Hearts was held in Portage and won by Jennifer Jones.

In 2015, the city had a junior roller derby team.

Portage is represented in the Manitoba Major Soccer League by Prairie United in the MMSL Major Senior Division 5 Their home field is located in the Republic of Manitobah Park in the south-east corner of the city. The park has a dozen different sized soccer pitches, many baseball/softball diamonds and a rugby pitch.

Portage was a popular stop on the Great Western Manitoba Harness Racing circuit, but in 2009 the 1/2 mi (0.80 km) horse race track and stands were removed to make way for the Portage Credit Union Centre, now called Stride Place. It is a community centre with two arenas (one the home of the Terriers) and a water park. The former horse race stands were known as the Pan-Am Stadium and played host to baseball during the Winnipeg Pan-Am Games in 1967.

Portage la Prairie also has a lot of youth sports. Ringette, hockey, soccer and baseball have youth sports leagues within the city. Football is played in the Winnipeg Youth Football League with many teams of varying ages using the name Portage Pitbulls. Basketball is also played in Winnipeg in the Rising Stars League and in various community clubs. Also there is a healthy competition between the four junior high schools in sports such as basketball, volleyball and curling.

== Notable people ==
- Arron Asham, ice hockey right winger
- Gordie Bell, ice hockey goaltender
- Joe Bell, ice hockey left winger
- Rick Blight, ice hockey right winger
- Troy Bodie, ice hockey winger
- Bertram Brooker, writer, painter, musician
- Mark Henry Brown, first Canadian fighter ace of World War II
- James Cowan, physician and politician
- Doc Walker, country band
- Punch Dickins, aviator and bush pilot
- Siegfried Enns, Member of Parliament
- Shawn Farquhar, magician
- Gord Fashoway, ice hockey left winger
- David Faurschou, politician
- Gordon Fitzell, composer, concert organizer, and professor of music
- William Garland, merchant and politician
- E. A. Gilroy, ice hockey administrator, businessman, politician
- Bill Glennie, ice hockey right winger
- Charles Hay, merchant and politician
- Edward Hay, businessman and politician
- Bill Holmes, ice hockey centre
- Ross King, ice hockey goaltender
- Francis Wesley Lipsett, veterinarian and politician
- Ron Lyons, ice hockey left winger
- Arthur Meighen, ninth Prime Minister of Canada
- Maxwell Meighen, financier
- Theodore Meighen, lawyer and philanthropist
- Ernest Monias, musician
- Leo Murray, ice hockey forward
- Reagan Dale Neis, actress
- Brian Pallister, politician
- Norman McLeod Paterson, businessman and politician
- Propagandhi, punk rock band
- Allan Ronald, doctor and microbiologist
- Toby Sexsmith, politician and ice hockey administrator
- David Shand, ice hockey defenceman
- Craig Stewart, politician
- Charles Keith Taylor, lawyer and politician
