= Black Duck Creek (Manitoba) =

- Location of the mouth of Black Duck Creek in Manitoba

Location
- Country: Canada
- Province: Manitoba
- Region: Northern

Physical characteristics
- Source: Black Duck Lake
  - coordinates: 54°24′20″N 98°35′50″W
  - elevation: 211 m (692 ft)
- Mouth: Drunken Lake
  - coordinates: 54°30′28″N 98°28′21″W
  - elevation: 209 m (686 ft)

Basin features
- River system: Hudson Bay drainage basin

Black Duck Creek is a stream in the Northern Region of Manitoba, Canada. It is in the Hudson Bay drainage basin and is a right tributary of the Minago River.

Black Duck Creek begins at Black Duck Lake and travels east, then north before reaching its mouth at Drunken Lake, which drains via the Minago River and the Nelson River to Hudson Bay.

== See also ==
- List of rivers of Manitoba
