= CFRY =

Coordinates: 49.9692°N 98.3742°W

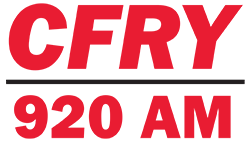
- Portage la Prairie, Manitoba; Canada
- Broadcast area: Central Plains Region
- Frequency: 920 kHz
- Branding: CFRY 920 AM

Programming
- Format: Country

Ownership
- Owner: Golden West Broadcasting
- Sister stations: CJPG-FM, CFRY-FM, CHPO-FM

History
- First air date: October 18, 1956
- Former frequencies: 1570 kHz (1956–1966)

Technical information
- Class: B
- Power: 25 kW daytime 15 kW nighttime

Links
- Website: cfryradio.ca

CFRY (920 AM) is a simulcasting radio station that broadcasts a country format. Licensed to Portage la Prairie, Manitoba, the station serves the Central Plains Region. The station is currently owned by Golden West Broadcasting, and is located at 2390 Sissons Drive, along with CHPO-FM and CJPG-FM.

It first began broadcasting in 1956 at 1570 kHz, before moving to its current dial position in 1966. An in-town repeater, CFRY-1-FM 93.1 MHz, was added in 1995.

On October 2, 2013, Golden West received approval from the CRTC to convert CFRY-FM-1 to a separate station, using the same facilities and parameters as the repeater, though broadcasting at 27,000 watts. When it began broadcasting, it carried a country format as CHPO-FM, while CFRY continued its country format.
