= Tepastenam =

Tepastenam (baptized as Donald William Sinclair Ross; c. 1805 – c. 1875) was a respected leader (Cree: kisayman) of the Pimicikamak indigenous people in the 19th century. From oral history accounts he may have been a Midewiwin leader/kisayman. The record of his baptism in 1875 describes him as "A noted conjurer for many years, who long resisted the teachings of Christianity."

== Life ==
Tepastenam's family had its wintering grounds at "John Scott's Lake". This has been identified as Setting Lake on the Grass River. He and his family members traded at Nelson House until 1843, and later he began trading at Norway House. Beginning in 1861, some of his children and grandchildren were baptized at Rossville.

In 1875, Tepastenam was baptized as Donald William Sinclair Ross, reportedly named after two Hudson's Bay Company Chief Factors: Donald Ross and William Sinclair. He was listed in the 1881 register of the Cross Lake Methodist congregation as "chief" and his wife May was listed as "chiefess". Ross first appears on the government of Canada pay list as "chief" in 1876. However, he "was a leader both before and after [Pimicikamak] entered treaty."

=== Treaty 5 ===
Tepastenam was notable as the lead signatory to Treaty 5 on behalf of the Pimicikamak people on September 24, 1875 in Norway House. Neither of the other two signatories matched his stature as a leader of the Pimicikamak people. His mark (an X) granted Treaty rights to the Crown in an area of the Northwest Territories that was twice the size of the Province of Manitoba at the time.
