= Ernest Monias =

Canadian musician

- Born: February 18, 1949 (age 77); Cross Lake First Nation, Manitoba
- Genres: Rock music, Country rock
- Occupations: Singer, songwriter
- Years active: 1979 - Present
- Label: Sunshine Records

Ernest Monias (born February 18, 1949) is a Cree recording artist from Manitoba, Canada. An important figure in Canadian Indigenous music, Monias has been nicknamed by the locals "The King of the North".

== Early life ==
Monias is born in Cross Lake First Nation and moved to Wabowden, Manitoba at the age of 4. He attended a residential school in Portage La Prairie, Manitoba.

== Music career ==
Monias released his first album in 1979, after being discovered by Ray St. Germain. The album Original Recordings included his most popular song "If I Wanted You Girl" and was followed by 21 more albums. Monias received the Lifetime Achievement Award at the Indigenous Music Awards. He was elected into the Manitoba Aboriginal Music Hall of Fame in 2005.
