= Treaty 5 =

Treaty between First Nations and Canadian Crown

Treaty Five is a treaty between Queen Victoria and Saulteaux and Swampy Cree non-treaty band governments and peoples around Lake Winnipeg in the District of Keewatin. Much of what is today central and northern Manitoba was covered by the treaty, as were a few small adjoining portions of the present-day provinces of Saskatchewan and Ontario.

The fifth of several treaties, Treaty 5 was completed in two rounds. The first was from September 1875 to September 1876. The Crown intended in 1875 to include only "the Indians [east and west] of Lake Winnipeg for the surrender of the Territory uncovered by previous treaties" including "the proposed migration of the Norway House band". Pimicikamak territory was north of the lake. It was included by accident or design of Tepastenam attending the Norway House signing. Additional peoples and groups signed on between 1908 and 1910.

== Historical context ==
Treaties had been signed with Indigenous Peoples in most districts well suited for agriculture in central Canada before Confederation in 1867. After Confederation, the purchase of Rupert's Land from the Hudson's Bay Company in 1870 brought to light the question of Indigenous land rights in the areas prime for agriculture in these newly acquired areas. Prior to the signing of treaties, the economy of the prairie provinces relied heavily on the Fur Trade. Though the Canadian government made a formal commitment to organizing and negotiating these treaties, there was little political movement and few resources devoted to the developments of the treaties. A topic commonly discussed during and before the Red River Resistance of 1869-1870 was the need to settle all outstanding Indigenous and specifically the Metis land entitlements. Since there was a large military presence from the Metis during the time of the Resistance, the Canadian Government could not ignore the pushes for treaty negotiations and this is why the Manitoba Act has specific details that the people of Red River would receive adequate land.

According to historian, James Daschuk, the first numbered treaties came about as a result of a strong position from both the Canadian Government and the Indigenous groups. The Indigenous interest in signing Treaty Five came about as a result of the decline in the fur trade. The lack of income from the fur trade was a strong signing motivator for the different Indigenous groups involved in Treaty Five. Prior to the signing of Treaty Five, there was a large influx of European settlers and there was a smallpox outbreak. There was also a large-scale food crisis that was affecting First Nations people in the North of Manitoba. The treaty negotiations from the Canadian government came from an interest in the natural resources in the area. Groups of Cree people from the great plains had been having difficulties with the Canadian government for around fifteen years prior to signing Treaty Five. Many groups had approached the government in previous years regarding a treaty but the government of Canada did not begin negotiations until 1875.

== Negotiations ==
Prior to 1871, Canada had no clear policy on how to deal with the Indigenous populations in the west. Initially, Indigenous groups in the Lake Winnipeg area were supposed to be included in either Treaties One or Two, but distance made this illogical. This did not mean that the Indigenous Peoples in this area were not interested in developing a treaty. The Canadian government, in conjunction with Lieutenant Governor Alexander Morris and the Minister of the Interior, David Laird agreed that a treaty should be signed with Indigenous peoples in this area on 2 July 1875. In 1875, the Canadian Government appointed Lieutenant Governor Alexander Morris and the Honourable James McKay to negotiate terms with the different Indigenous groups. The treaty negotiations happened very quickly, three different negotiation sessions took place, each lasting one day. The commissioners of Treaty Five negotiated individually with each Indigenous group involved. Although the Indigenous Peoples in Northern Manitoba are covered under the same treaty as those in the Southern areas, they signed much later than those in the south and for different reasons. The first negotiation and signing of Treaty Five had a lot of input from the Indigenous peoples involved in the treaty. Since there was input from the Indigenous peoples the conditions for the treaty and subsequent agreements were much more appealing to the Indigenous peoples than what the government had originally suggested. The Northern section of the treaty that is now included in Treaty Five was not part of the original agreement. This section was added in 1909-1910 and was not added in the original treaty because there was little interest from the government in utilizing land that was not suitable for agriculture. It was not until the priorities of the government changed at the turn of the century that the government developed an interest in this land. Only once the economic climate changed in the north did the government decide that this land could be beneficial to the development of Canada. Therefore, the reasoning for Treaty Five was twofold: it was because of the Indigenous desire to be included in the agreements that so many other indigenous groups were getting as well as the Canadian governments need to open up new areas for future development. The final boundary of the treaty was along the Manitoba and Ontario border and was not set until 1910 partly because of how long the Ontario-Manitoba border took to settle.

== Terms ==
The terms for Treaty Five are similar to the terms for Treaty One and Treaty Two. These terms included a promise from the government to provide treaty supplies like ammunition and twine, annuities, access to resources, reserves, and support for agriculture while the Indigenous Peoples were required to maintain law and order and give land to the government. The size of the reserves created in Treaty Five were significantly smaller than those of other treaties. Since the land involved in Treaty Five was not as valuable as the plains, they were not offered the same treaty terms as were offered in Treaty Three and Treaty Four. Treaty Three and Treaty Four had 640 acres for a family of five, whereas Treaty Five granted each family of five 160 acres, or sometimes even 100 acres, which is more similar to the terms of Treaty One and Treaty Two. Terms for Treaty Five included a sum of 500 dollars to aid in the removal of their current houses and to rebuild new houses on the reserve land. A gratuity of five dollars was paid per person to each Indian recognized under the Treaty as well as fifteen dollars for the band leader and 150 dollars for the Chief.

== Geography ==
Treaty Five covers a great deal of central and northern Manitoba as well as smaller sections of Ontario and Saskatchewan. Treaty Five covers part of the Interlake, the Shield country next to Lake Winnipeg, and the lower Saskatchewan River. The land area that Treaty Five covers is approximately 100,000 square miles. The reserve site proposed by Alexander Miller was located to the west of Lake Winnipeg at Fisher's River. The land in this area was originally thought to not be equipped for agricultural growth and therefore was not originally a candidate for a treaty. In 1874, Lieutenant-Governor Alexander Morris is quoted as saying "the country lying adjacent to Norway House is not adapted to agriculture purposes" and "there is therefore no present necessity for the negotiation of any treaty". The land that Treaty Five covers was needed by the Canadian Government for the railway that was being built, as they believed that Winnipeg was going to be a centre of communication for the prairies. Lake Winnipeg was seen as valuable body of water as it could be used for both transport and trade. The right of way for steamboats on Lake Winnipeg was a priority for the government, making Treaty Five land very important.

== Timeline ==
=== First Treaty trip, 1875 ===
Alexander Morris and James McKay were sent as commissioners to negotiate the treaty. On September 20, 1875, Morris and McKay met with Berens River bands at the Wesleyan Mission School House near a trading post along the river. This meeting went smoothly with the only debates being about how the new chiefs were to be elected and how the locations of the reserves were to be chosen. Eventually these issues were resolved and the commissioners received acceptance of the terms.

The next day the commissioners went north to discuss the treaty with two bands of Cree, one Christian and one not, called the Wood Band at Norway House by Nelson River. The treaty was signed by the band with little protest and Morris and McKay moved along.

Morris and McKay then moved along to the Grand River Rapids on the Saskatchewan River to meet with the Indigenous groups there on September 27, 1875.They gave this group of Indigenous peoples the same explanation of the treaty that they had given the previous groups. The difference in this case is that the band would need to move from the North side of the river to the South side since the area that they were currently occupying was ideal for a transportation development. The band requested 500 dollars to pay for the rebuilding and moving of their entire settlement and were granted this from the commissioners.

On their way south along Lake Winnipeg on September 28, Morris and McKay came across a man who said his name was Thickfoot and was a spokesperson for the Jack Head Point peoples as well as the peoples of Big Island, Black Island, Wapand, and other islands in the area. He explained to Morris and McKay that he and the people he represented had heard that the commissioners had been having negotiations with other groups and bands and they wanted a chance to be included in the Treaty. Morris and McKay told Thickfoot that a group would be by the following summer to negotiate and confirm the treaty.

Before heading home at the end of the trip. Morris and McKay decided to change the western boundaries of the treaty to include the Swampy Cree at The Pas Settlement on the Saskatchewan River. This area was seen as very important to the government for future developments. The negotiations were set to take place the following summer.

=== Second Treaty trip, 1876 ===
Morris and McKay assigned a politician, Thomas Howard, and a land surveyor, John Lestock Reid, to undertake the task of visiting the bands that had not yet signed the treaty and negotiating with them on the Second Treaty Trip in the summer of 1876. On July 24 they met at Dog Head Point with bands from Bloodvein River, Big Island, Sandy Bar, and St. Peters band as well as Thickfoot's Jack Fish Head band. Negotiations did not go as planned when multiple of the representatives stated that they wanted private negotiations instead of negotiating with multiple other bands present. The Commissioners advised that the bands would only have one chief and a few representatives that would speak for the majority. The representatives were to be chosen by ballot which was extremely unconventional to the Indigenous peoples. This odd way of appointing a leader and having limited people from each band presents indicates that some of the Indigenous groups were not adequately represented in the negotiations.

On August fourth, Howard and Reid headed to Berens River to meet with the Indigenous peoples who had not signed the treaty the summer before when Morris and McKay had been there. The treaty was signed with little discussion and Howard and Reid proceeded on their journey.

Howard and Reid headed to the Saskatchewan River to meet with the Indigenous groups near the Grand River Rapids and provide them with the 500 dollars and other supplies agreed on in the previous year's meeting. The Chief of the Grand Rapids band put forth a number of new demands because he was under the impression that the negotiations were still ongoing. Howard had to explain to them that the treaty was completed the previous year and the band eventually agreed to the terms although they still maintain that they had been misled by the terms of the treaty.

Howard and Reid then both set off to different bands to provide goods promised in the previous year or to negotiate new terms with groups who had not been up to negotiations the previous summer.

Treaty terms were adjusted until 1907, although the Government of Canada was reluctant to make changes between 1876 and 1907. In 1930, the Canadian government and each of the prairie provinces signed the Natural Resources Transfer Agreement, allowing the prairie provinces more control over the land and resources.

- 20 September 1875: signing of Treaty 5 at Berens River, Manitoba
- 24 September 1875: signing of Treaty 5 by Norway House and Pimicikamak peoples at Norway House, Manitoba
- 27 September. 1875: Grand Rapids signing
- 28 September 1875: signing by Wa-Pang or Dog-Head community, to be included with the reservation assigned for the Norway House community
- 26 July 1876: Big Island signing at Wa-Pang/Dog-Head Island
- 4 August 1876: signing by Grand Rapids tribes at Beren's River
- 7 September 1876: signing by Black River Saulteaux band, signed in Winnipeg
- 7 September 1876: The Pas signing by tribes in that region
- 26 June 1908: Split Lake adhesion signing
- 8 July 1908: Norway House adhesion signing
- 15 July 1908: Cross Lake adhesion signing
- 30 July 1908: Nelson House adhesion signing
- 24 August 1908: Fisher River adhesion signing
- 29 July 1909: Oxford House adhesion signing
- 6 August 1909: God's Lake adhesion signing
- 13 August 1909: Island Lake adhesion signing
- 9 June 1910: Deer's Lake East adhesion signing
- 10 August 1910: York Factory adhesion signing

== Issues ==
The speed at which the treaty was negotiated left room for a great deal of misunderstanding for both the government commissioners and the Indigenous peoples. In many instances, treaties were negotiated orally and then were written down separately. In some cases, the oral terms negotiated with Indigenous groups did not match what was eventually written down. This posed issues as there were sometimes two varying terms of the negotiations. Another issue that treaty negotiations faced was the language barrier, especially in what is known as the “surrender clause.” The official language used in Treaty Five is, “The Saulteaux and Swampy Cree Tribes of Indians and all other the Indians inhabiting the district hereinafter described and defined, do hereby cede, release, surrender and yield up to the Government of the Dominion of Canada, for Her Majesty the Queen and Her successors for ever, all their rights, titles and privileges whatsoever to the lands included within the following limits.” However, a present-day Indigenous leader translated the text to mean “I quit this land,” stating that if the Indigenous groups had known what they were agreeing to, they would not have signed.

One of the issues that Indigenous groups encountered were the smaller portions of land that they received as opposed to the land received in previous treaties. Smaller lands and smaller reserve area led to fewer resources in the long run for Indigenous peoples included in Treaty Five. Fewer benefits were given to Indigenous people included in Treaty Five than in previous numbered treaties.

In 1895, Indigenous missionary James Settee informed the Lieutenant-General, J. Shultz that at least twenty residents of the reserve had not received their annuity. Another issue encountered by the Treaty-Indians in 1876 was an immigration of Icelandic immigrants who settled on land that had been requested in Treaty Five or that was being inhabited by Indigenous groups who had signed Treaty Five, smallpox then broke out and many settlers and Indigenous people perished in the winter of 1877. The decade of the 1880s saw a rise in the death rate on reserves from Tuberculosis.

== Present day ==
Although the terms in which the treaties were signed may not have been exactly what the Indigenous groups wanted, the acceptance of these treaties created a permanent relationship between the Canadian government and these groups. Many Indigenous groups feel that the treaties in general restrict traditional activities, while still acknowledging the good that treaties did in the past. After the signing of Treaty Five until around 1930, First Nations hunting was becoming more and more restricted by laws and regulations. Many Indigenous groups that signed Treaty Five have ongoing land claims with the Canadian Government. Another contemporary issue facing signatories of Treaty Five is that the land they live on is in extremely rural areas, making access to hospitals and resources difficult. The cost of living and transportation can be very high, which poses an issue.

== List of Treaty Five First Nations / People ==
There were many different groups involved in the signing of Treaty Five. Both Indigenous groups and Métis groups were involved.

- Manitoba
  - Berens River First Nation
  - Bloodvein First Nation
  - Bunibonibee Cree Nation
  - Chemawawin Cree Nation
  - Fisher River Cree Nation
  - Fox Lake Cree Nation
  - Garden Hill First Nations
  - God's Lake First Nation
  - Grand Rapids First Nation
  - Hollow Water First Nation
  - Kinonjeoshtegon First Nation
  - Black River First Nation
  - Little Grand Rapids First Nation
  - Manto Sipi Cree Nation
  - Mosakahiken Cree Nation
  - Nisichawayasihk Cree Nation
  - Norway House Cree Nation
  - Opaskwayak Cree Nation
  - Pauingassi First Nation
  - Pimicikamak
  - Poplar River First Nation
  - Red Sucker Lake First Nation
  - St. Theresa Point First Nation
  - Sayisi Dene First Nation
  - Shamattawa First Nation
  - Tataskweyak Cree Nation
  - War Lake First Nation
  - Wasagamack First Nation
  - York Factory First Nation
- Ontario
  - Deer Lake First Nation
  - North Spirit Lake First Nation
  - Pikangikum First Nation
  - Poplar Hill First Nation
  - Sandy Lake First Nation
- Saskatchewan
  - Cumberland House First Nation
  - Red Earth First Nation
  - Shoal Lake First Nation

== See also ==
- Numbered Treaties
- The Canadian Crown and First Nations, Inuit and Métis
- Council of Keewatin
- District of Keewatin
- Nishnawbe Aski Nation
