= Minago River =

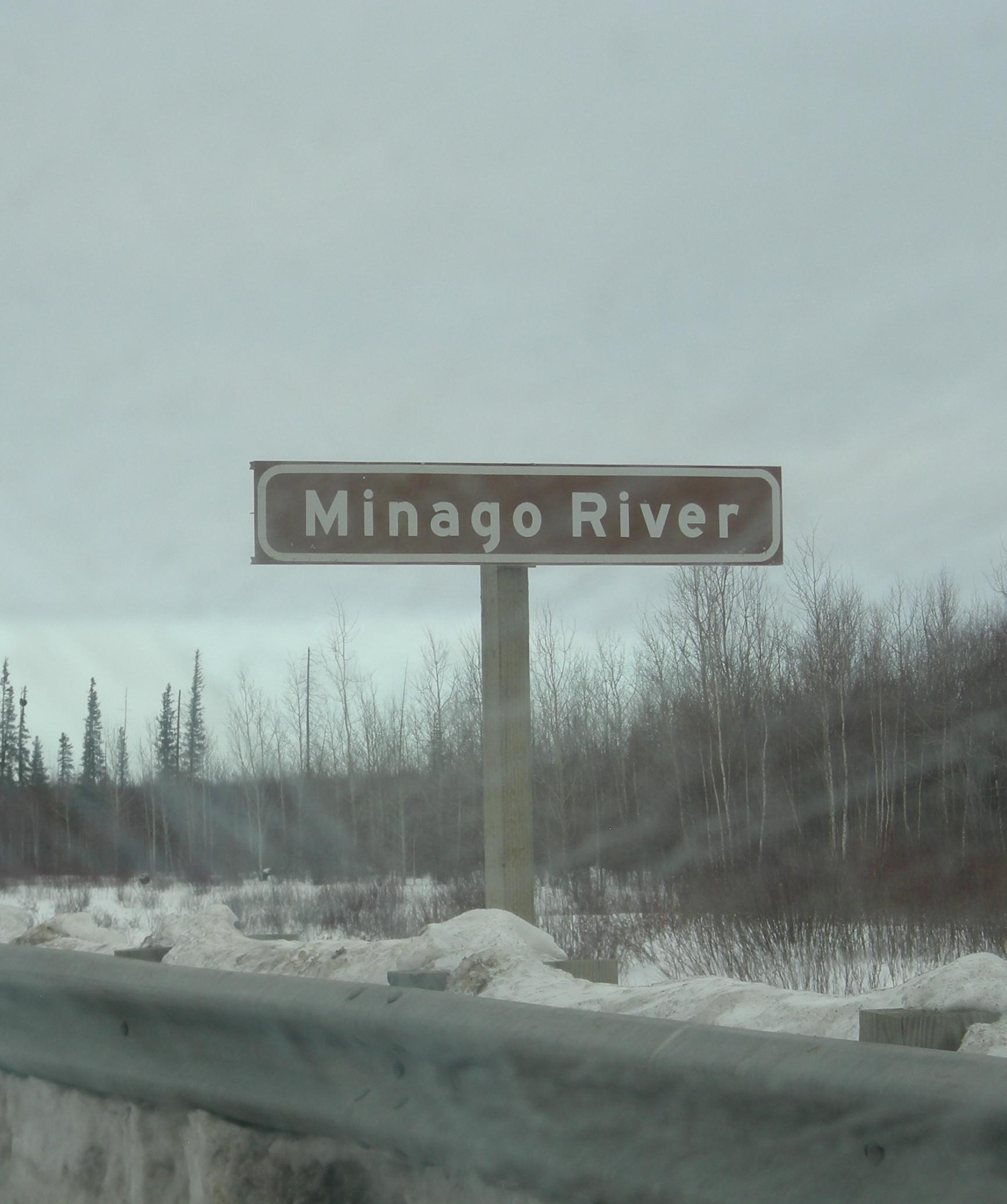
- Sign for the Minago River

- Location of the mouth of Minago River in Manitoba

Location
- Country: Canada
- Province: Manitoba
- Region: Northern

Physical characteristics
- Source: Moon Lake northeast of South Moose Lake
  - coordinates: 54°05′25″N 99°30′54″W
  - elevation: 261 m (856 ft)
- Mouth: Cross Lake on the Nelson River
  - coordinates: 54°32′58″N 98°11′58″W
  - elevation: 209 m (686 ft)

Basin features
- River system: Hudson Bay drainage basin
- Tributaries
  - left: Hargrave River

Minago River is a river in the Hudson Bay drainage basin in Northern Manitoba, Canada. It flows in a northeasterly direction from Moon Lake into the western end of Cross Lake on the Nelson River.

From Moon Lake a portage led to South Moose Lake and the Saskatchewan River.

== Tributaries ==
- Black Duck Creek (right)
- Hargrave River (left)

== See also ==
- List of rivers of Manitoba
