= Cross Lake First Nation =

Band of Cree First Nations people in Manitoba, Canada

Cross Lake Band
- Band No. 276
- ᐱᒥᒋᑲᒫᐠ ᓃᐦᐃᖬᐑ pimicikamâk nîhithawî
- Location within Manitoba
- People: Cree
- Treaty: Treaty 5
- Headquarters: Cross Lake
- Province: Manitoba

Land
- Main reserve: Cross Lake 19
- Land area: 104.386 km^{2} (40.304 sq mi)

Population (2019)
- On reserve: 6223
- On other land: 166
- Off reserve: 2520
- Total population: 8909

Government
- Chief: David A. Monias
- Council: Mervin Garrick; Donald Mckay; Wayne Mcleod; Noretta Miswaggon; Ivan Monias; Shirley Robinson; Kyle Scribe; Lee Thomas

Website
- https://crosslakeband.ca/

Cross Lake First Nation (Cree: ᐱᒥᒋᑲᒫᐠ ᓃᐦᐃᖬᐑ, pimicikamâk nîhithawî, lit. 'Cree of the Lake that lies Athwart' or Nikikonakos lit. 'Otter People') is a band of Cree First Nations people in Canada governed under the Indian Act. Its members occupy several reserves within the town of Cross Lake situated on the east shore of Cross Lake in the province of Manitoba. In October 2008, its recorded registered membership was 6,969, of which 4,953 people of this First Nation lived on their reserve. Cross Lake is the principal community of the Pimicikamak indigenous people that made treaty with the British Crown in 1875. Its indigenous language is Woods Cree. Cross Lake was the site of a residential school operated under Canada's assimilation policy. In 2008, Prime Minister Stephen Harper apologized for the damage caused by this policy.

In March 2016, Cross Lake appeared in the national news after its officials declared a state of emergency because of an epidemic of suicides. The Canadian Press reported that there had been "six suicides in the last two months", and band councillor Donnie McKay said the community "is traumatized and needs immediate help from the provincial and federal governments".

== Demographics ==
As of August 2014 Cross Lake First Nation had a total registered membership of 8,034 with 5,642 members living on-reserve.

== Governance ==
Under the Indian Act, Cross Lake First Nation has a municipal government with a Band Council. Since 1999, the Band Council is no longer elected under the Indian Act. The Executive Council of Pimicikamak sits ex officio as the Council of the Band but continues to be the agent of the Minister of Indian Affairs for delivering programs to band members on reserve.

=== Chief and Council ===
Chief and Councillors are appointed under the Custom Electoral System. In their council a quorum of 5 members is needed.

==== Chief ====
- Chief David A. Monias
  - Principal Spokesperson of the Nation
  - Primary Intergovernmental Affairs
  - Government Relations
  - International Relations

==== Council ====
- Councillor
  - Northern Flood Agreement
    - All Northern Flood Agreement Claims/Matters
  - Reserve Lands
  - Natural Resources

Member of the Financial Management Board
Executive Council Relations

- Councillor
  - Justice Restoration
  - Justice
    - Band Constables
    - RCMP
    - Courts
    - Corrections
  - Gaming
  - Elders Council Liaison
- Councillor
  - Housing
  - Education
  - Culture & Heritage
  - Cree Language
- Councillor Donnie Mckay
  - Health
  - Economic Development
  - Public Works
  - Highways & Transportation
  - Midnorth Development Corporation
  - Ponton
  - Arena Trust

Member of the Financial Management Board

- Councillor
  - Communications
    - MCTV
    - CFNC
    - Cell Phone/Internet
  - Taxation
  - Recreation
  - Youth Council Liaison
  - Men's Wellness
- Councillor Shirley Robinson
  - Finance
  - Band Administration
  - Pathways
  - Employment & Training
  - Mining

Chair of the Financial Management Board

- Councillor
  - Aboriginal Headstart Program
  - Day Care
  - Muchipuniwin Program
  - PCN Campaign
  - Women's Council Liaison
- Councillor Grace Ross
  - Welfare
  - Old Folks Home
  - Awasis Agency (Cross Lake)
  - Membership/Citizenship
  - PCN Laws Amendments
  - New Proposed PCN Laws

== Reserves ==
Cross Lake First Nation have reserved for themselves several tracts of land as their reserve holdings. Their largest reserve is the 2,037.10 hectares (5,033.8 acres) Cross Lake 19 Reserve. Associated with this reserve are:

- Cross Lake 19A Reserve
- Cross Lake 19B Reserve
- Cross Lake 19C Reserve
- Cross Lake 19D Reserve
- Cross Lake 19E Reserve
- Cross Lake 19X01 Reserve
- Cross Lake 19X02 Reserve
- Cross Lake 19X03 Reserve
- Cross Lake 19X05 Reserve
- Cross Lake 19X06 Reserve
- Whiskeyjack Reserve

== Community ==
Cross Lake, Manitoba is the principal community for the Cross Lake First Nation. Other major communities for the First Nation are:

- Pikwitonei, Manitoba
- Thicket Portage, Manitoba
- Wabowden, Manitoba

== Child protection ==
Cross Lake was the site of a residential school operated under Canada's aboriginal assimilation policy. In 2008, Prime Minister Stephen Harper apologized for the "profoundly negative" consequences of this policy. Cross Lake has its own child welfare mandate and operates under the name Nikan Awasisak Agency Inc. with sub offices both in Thompson and Winnipeg for aboriginal child protection on reserve.

== Highway connection ==
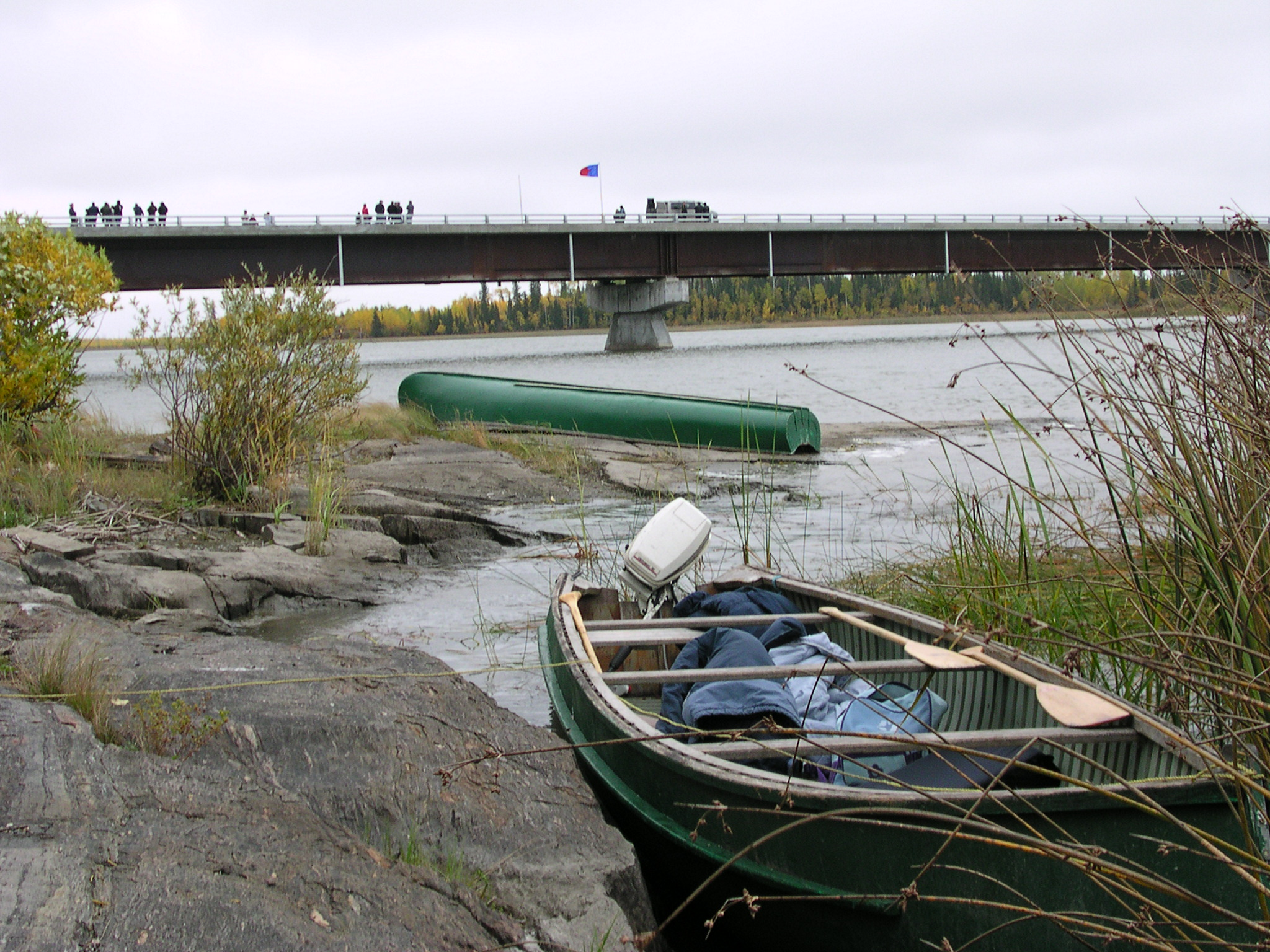
Kichi Sipi Bridge.

Cross Lake is the only community in north-eastern Manitoba that is connected to the North American highway system by all-weather road via the C$24 M Kichi Sipi Bridge, which the Province of Manitoba built after losing a lawsuit.

== Education ==
The Cross Lake Education Authority is legally part of the Cross Lake First Nation but is operated by an independent elected Board. It runs two schools on the Cross Lake First Nation's reserves. Otter Nelson River School is a Sr. 1-4 High School and also an Elementary school (N-4). Mikisew Middle School is a school with grades 5–8.
