= Cross Lake (Manitoba) =

Lake in Manitoba, Canada

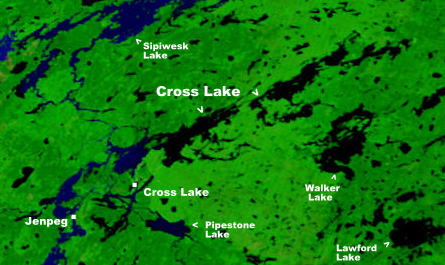
- Cross Lake north of Lake Winnipeg

- Location of Cross Lake in Manitoba Cross Lake (Canada)
- Location: Manitoba
- Coordinates: 54°43′N 97°33′W
- Primary inflows: Nelson River, Minago River
- Primary outflows: Nelson River
- Catchment area: 8,099 km^{2} (3,127 sq mi)
- Basin countries: Canada
- Max. length: 102 km (63 mi)
- Surface area: 755 km^{2} (292 sq mi)
- Average depth: 1.25 m (4 ft 1 in)
- Max. depth: 12 m (39 ft)
- Water volume: 0.52 km^{3} (420,000 acre⋅ft)
- Residence time: 0.006 years
- Shore length^{1}: 1,330 km (830 mi)
- Surface elevation: 207 m (679 ft)
- Islands: many islands including Cross Island
- Settlements: Cross Lake, Cross Lake First Nation
- ^{1} Shore length is not a well-defined measure.

Cross Lake is a large lake in Manitoba on the Nelson River north of Lake Winnipeg. It is long and narrow and extends 102 kilometres (63 mi) east-northeast.

The Nelson River west channel enters the lake at the Jenpeg Dam and the Nelson River east channel enters near the communities of Cross Lake and Cross Lake First Nation. The river then flows north to Sipiwesk Lake. The Minago River enters on the west.

The lake level is regulated by Manitoba Hydro at the Jenpeg Generating Station (54°32′36″N 98°1′36″W) at the southern end of the lake.

== Portage routes ==
From Moon Lake, the source of the Minago River, a portage led to South Moose Lake and the Saskatchewan River. On the southeast side of Cross Lake via the Walker River, Walker Lake and Kapaspwaypanik Lake the Kapaspwaypanik Portage led to the Carrot River and Oxford Lake on the Hayes River.

== See also ==
- List of lakes of Manitoba
- List of generating stations in Manitoba
- Nelson River Hydroelectric Project
