= Hatherly =

Hatherly is a surname. Notable people with the surname include:

- Alan Hatherly (born 1996), South African mountain bike racer
- Ana Hatherly (1929–2015), Portuguese academic, poet, visual artist, and writer
- Casey Hatherly, Canadian activist
- Hannah Hatherly Maynard (1834–1918), Canadian photographer

== See also ==
- Hatherley (disambiguation)
