= On2Ottawa =

Canadian climate change advocacy group

- Type: Group
- Purpose: Climate change advocacy
- Location: Canada
- Key people: Casey Hatherly

On2Ottawa is a Canadian environmental activist group founded in March 2023. Their members engage in civil disobedience to pressure the Government of Canada to take action on climate change, often to the point of arrest. Their actions have included traffic obstructions, disruption of cultural events, and art vandalism.

== Views ==
The group draws inspiration from the teaching of UK climate scientist David King. They aspire to unite other Canadian environmental groups to converge in Ottawa for mass protest.

On2Ottawa has called for the creation of a legally-binding citizens' assembly to develop environmental policy.

Prompted by the unprecedented severity of the 2023 Canadian wildfires, On2Ottawa has called for the implementation in Canada of a nationalized firefighting service.

== History of activities ==
On March 1, 2023, three On2Ottawa activists, including Laura Sullivan, smeared pink paint on an exhibit at the Royal British Columbia Museum in Victoria. The activists applied the washable paint to a model of a Woolly mammoth. Victoria police arrested the activists and charged them with mischief.

Two weeks later, On2Ottawa activist Casey Hatherly interrupted singer Avril Lavigne while presenting on stage during the Juno Awards of 2023. Naked from the waist up, Hatherly had "Land back", "Save the green belt" and "Stop logging old growth now" was written on her torso. Hatherly was charged with mischief and was detained overnight in Edmonton Remand Centre before appearing in an Edmonton court.

On April 15, 2023, Hatherly splattered pink paint around the entrance of the Office of the Prime Minister. Hatherly posed with a sign that stated “Demand climate action now!” before chaining herself to the building. Two On2Ottawa members were detained by police after firefighters cut the chain attaching Hatherly to the building.

On August 8, 2023, Sullivan set off pink smoke bombs and sprayed pink paint on the Toronto Sign in Toronto, before gluing herself to its base.

From August 20 to September 9, 2023, On2Ottawa members participated in periodic traffic obstruction throughout the capital and in neighbouring Gatineau, leading to multiple arrests.

On August 29, 2023, Kaleb Suedfeld, a member of On2Ottawa, threw washable pink paint on Tom Thomson's Northern River at the National Gallery of Canada. Suedfeld glued himself to the floor and read out a statement before being arrested and charged with mischief. The painting, protected by a glass covering, was undamaged. It was placed back on display on August 30.
