= Flash drought =

Type of drought

A flash drought is a type of drought characterized by its rapid onset, intensification, and severity over a relatively short timescale, usually within a few days or weeks. This concept has evolved during the last decade as researchers have become more interested in understanding and mitigating its impacts. There is no standard definition for flash droughts. Indicators used to classify flash droughts in scientific literature include its agricultural and ecological impacts, its rate of onset, its duration, and combinations of timing and severity. Flash droughts differ from other drought categories such as meteorological, hydrological, agricultural, ecological, and socioeconomic droughts, in that they develop and intensify more quickly, posing unique challenges for monitoring, prediction, and mitigation.

== History ==
Flash droughts have gained increasing attention from researchers and policymakers due to their significant impacts on agriculture and water resources. The term "flash drought" was coined to describe the rapid onset and intensification of drought conditions, which set it apart from other, more conventional drought types that develop over longer periods. Early research focused on understanding the unique characteristics and drivers of flash droughts, while more recent studies have explored their impacts on agriculture, ecosystems, and water resources.

=== Remote sensing ===
Remote sensing data, such as satellite-derived measurements of soil moisture, evapotranspiration, and vegetation indices, can provide valuable information on the development and progression of flash droughts. Remote sensing data can be used to assess the rapid response of ecosystems to flash droughts by analysing multiple ecological metrics derived from satellite observations. These metrics, such as gross primary productivity (GPP), net primary productivity (NPP), and leaf area index (LAI), can provide insights into the reactions of ecosystems to flash droughts from both vegetation physiological and structural perspectives.

== Impacts ==
Drier air caused by flash droughts can increase the risk of heat waves, increasing human and animal mortality. It can also increase the amount of dead and dried vegetation, raising the risk of wildfire; the 2023 Canadian wildfires were partially driven by flash droughts in Canada's east.
