= 2023 Canadian wildfires =

Canadian wildfires of 2023
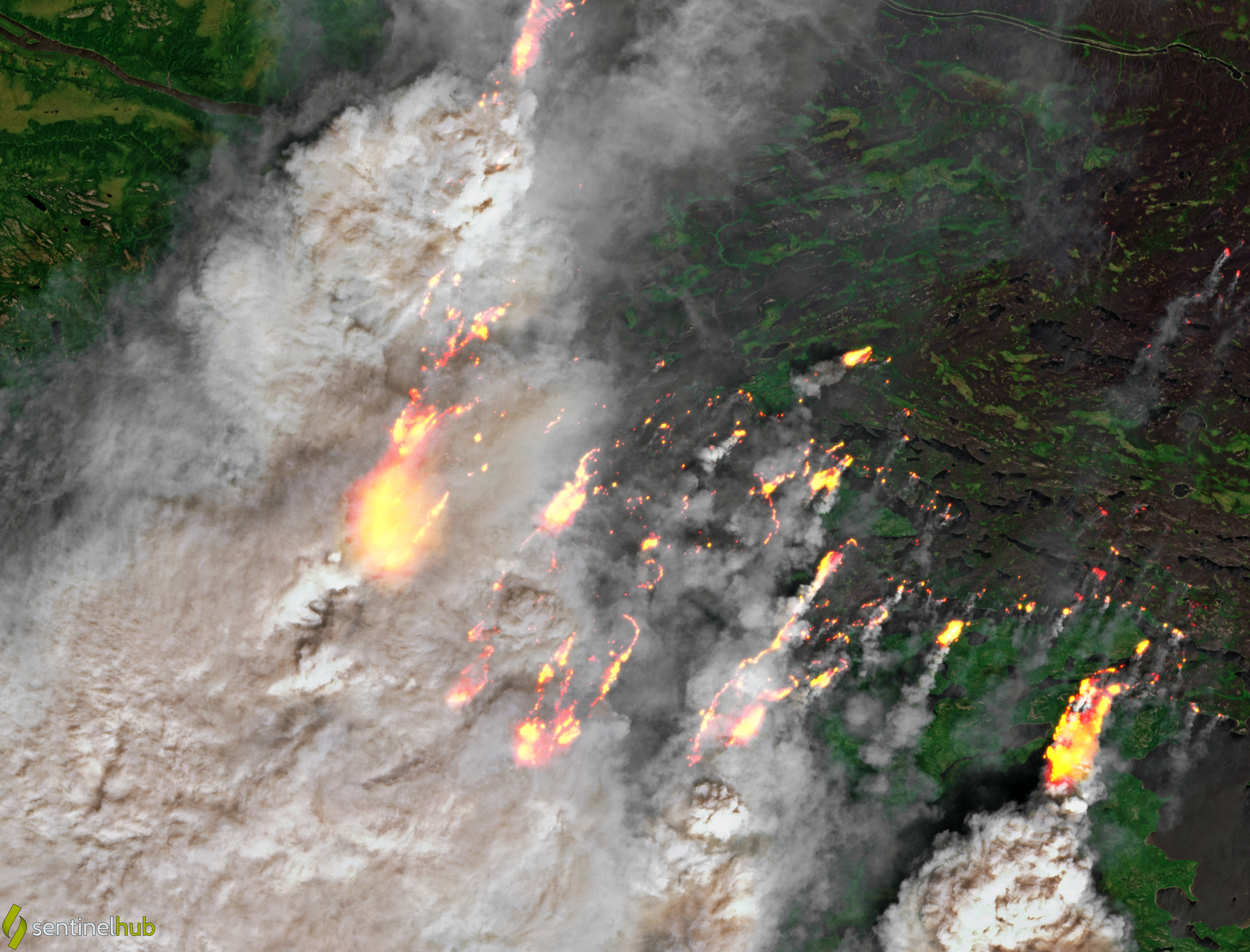
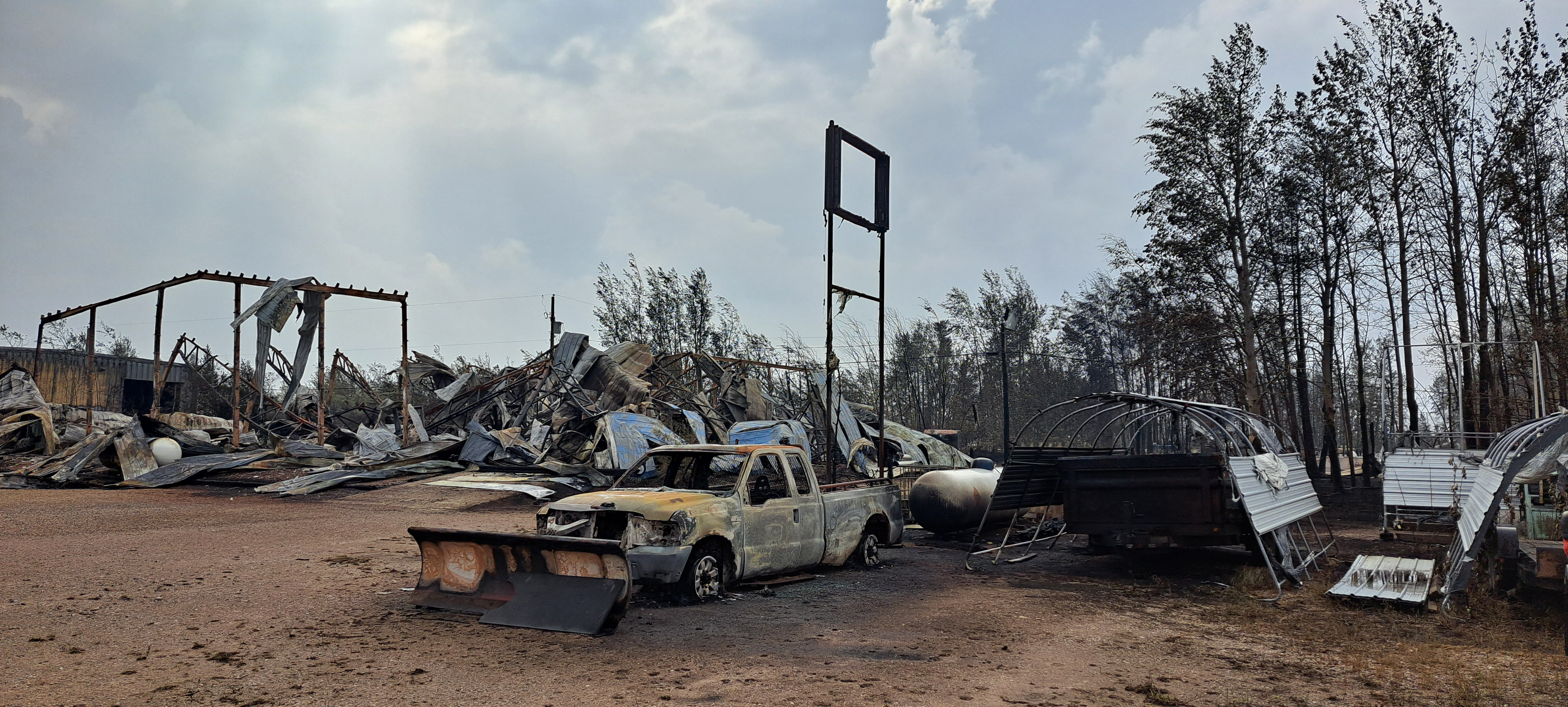
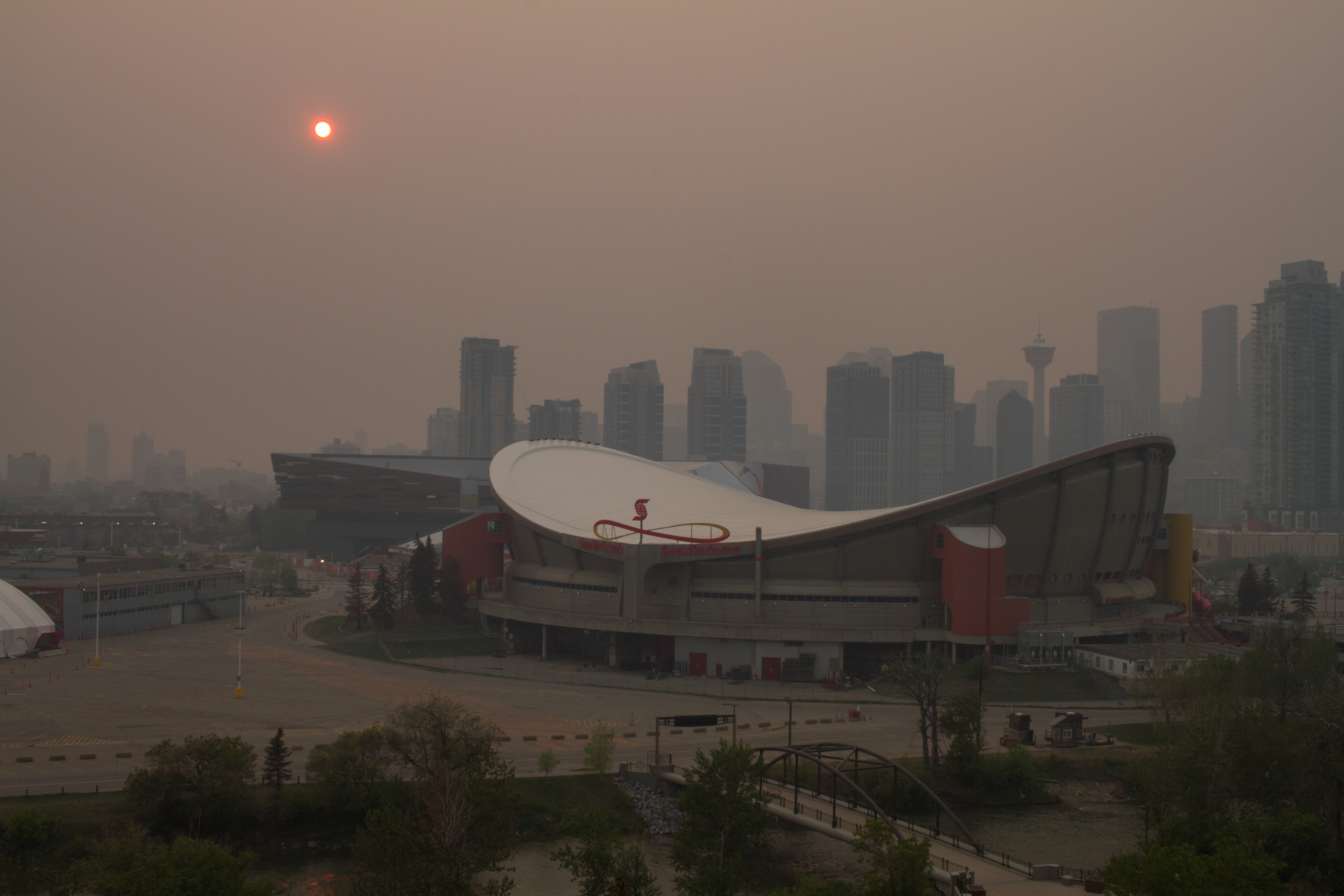
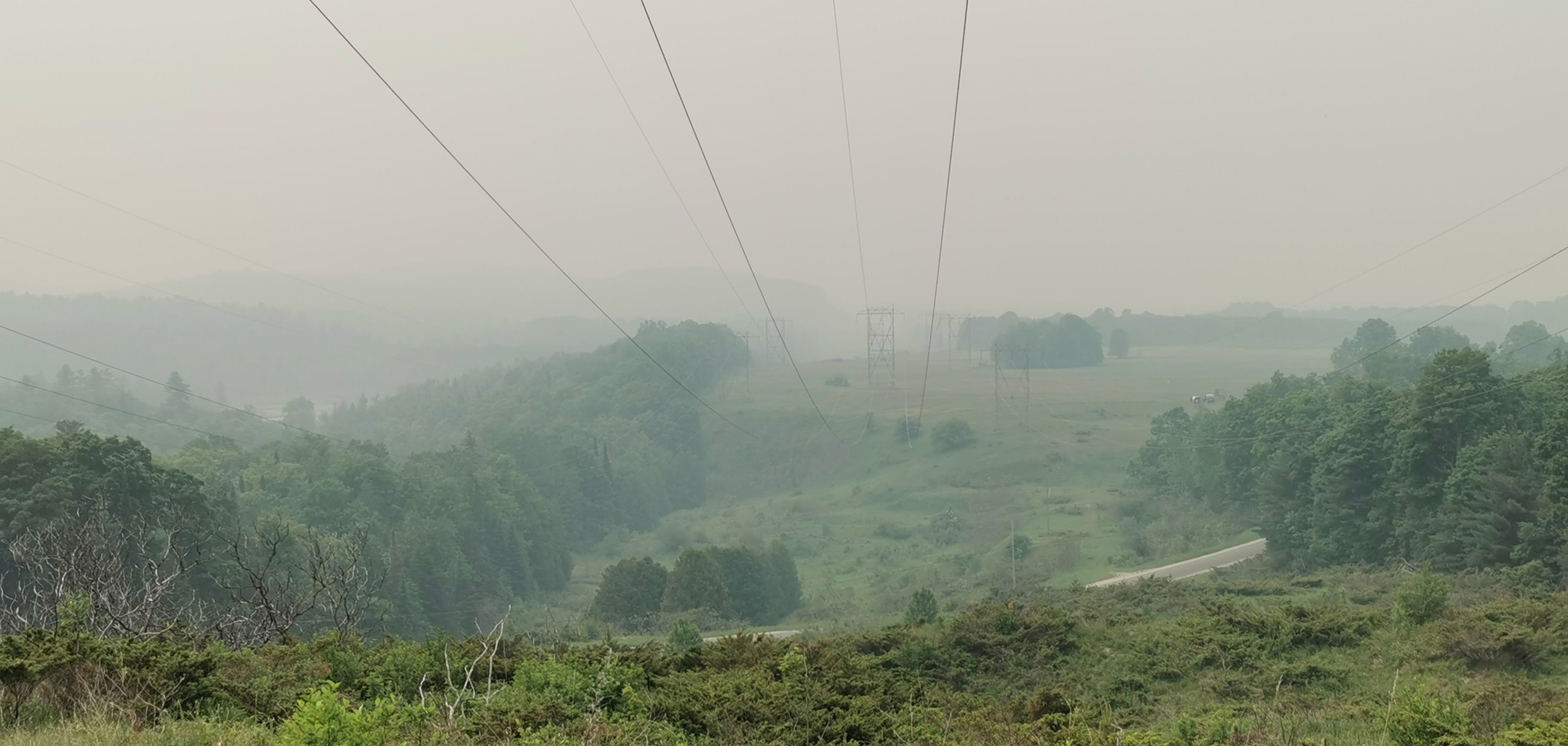
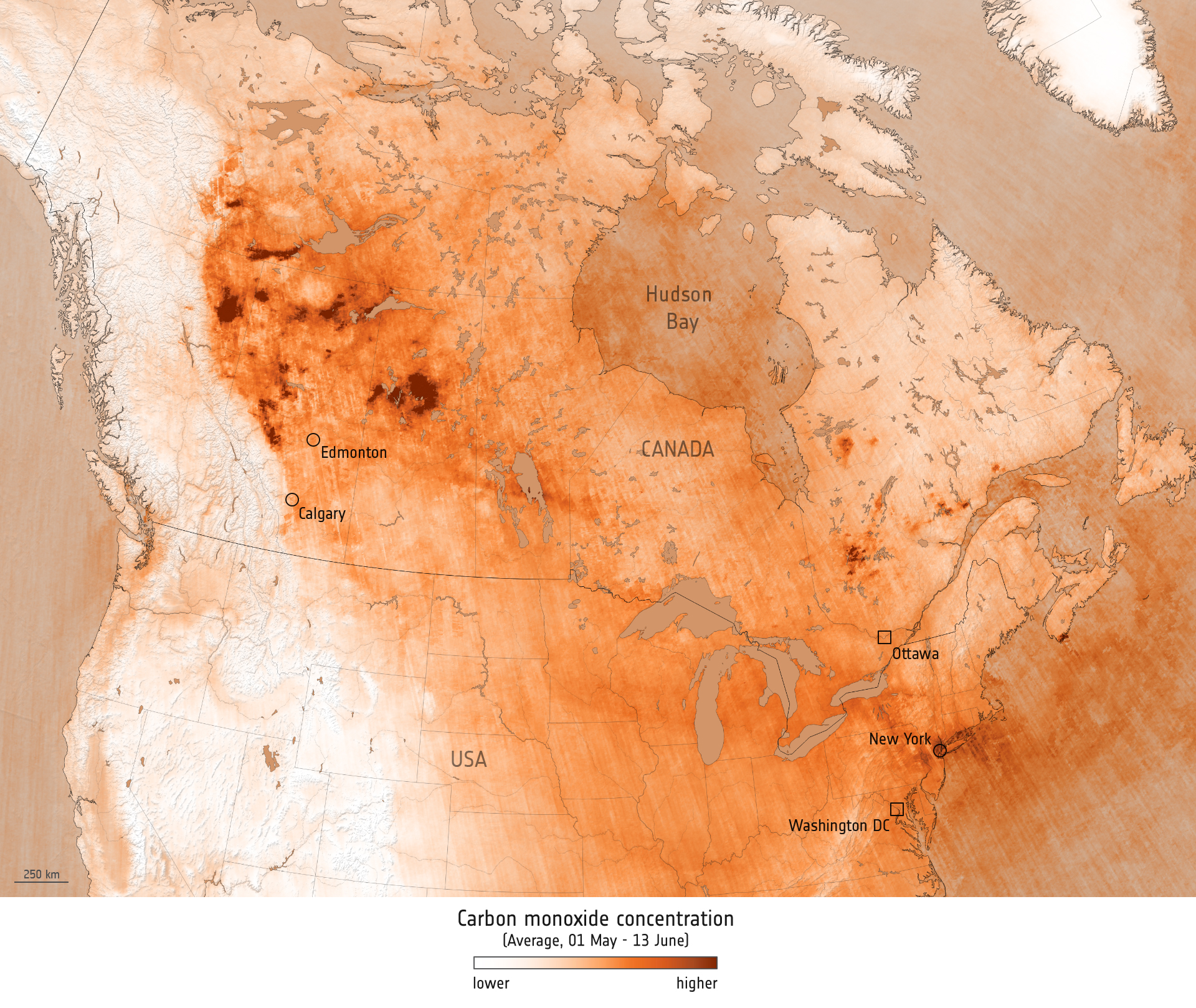
- Top-to-bottom, left-to-right: Wildfires in Quebec; Enterprise, Northwest Territories after being burnt to the ground; Wildfire smoke in Calgary; Wildfire smoke in Ontario; Map of carbon monoxide concentration caused by wildfire smoke
- Date: March 1, 2023 – November 2023
- Location: Canada (all 13 provinces and territories) and subsequent spillover into the Northern United States

Statistics
- Total fires: 6,551 (as of October 6, 2023)
- Total area: 18.496 million ha (45.70 million acres) (as of October 6, 2023)

Impacts
- Deaths: 8
- Evacuated: 185,000–232,000

Map
- Perimeters of 2023 Canadian wildfires - season to date (map data)

Beginning in March 2023, and with increased intensity starting in June, Canada was affected by a record-setting series of wildfires. All 13 provinces and territories were affected, with large fires in Alberta, British Columbia, the Northwest Territories, Nova Scotia, Ontario, and Quebec. The 2023 wildfire season had the most area burned in Canada's recorded history, surpassing the 1989, 1995, and 2014 fire seasons, as well as in recorded North American history, surpassing the 2020 Western US wildfire season.

As of October 6, 6,551 fires had burned 184,961 square kilometres (71,414 sq mi), about 5% of the entire forest area of Canada, and more than six times the long-term average of 27,300 square kilometres (10,541 sq mi) for that time of the year. As of mid-October, the total area burnt was more than 2.5 times the previous record. Eight firefighters were killed, and 185,000 to 232,000 people were displaced, including 16,400 in Nova Scotia's capital of Halifax, 21,720 in the Northwest Territories capital of Yellowknife, and almost 30,000 in British Columbia's Kelowna and West Kelowna. Thousands of international firefighters travelled to Canada to combat the fires.

Smoke emitted from the wildfires caused air quality alerts and evacuations in Canada and the United States. In late June, the smoke crossed the Atlantic Ocean, reaching Europe. Many of the largest fires were under control by July, including fires which had funnelled smoke into the Eastern Seaboard. However, significant fires continued well into the fall season, with several major fires breaking out in September. Moderate-to-severe drought conditions from British Columbia to northern Ontario also continued into fall. Though most of the fires were extinguished by winter, some in northern Alberta and British Columbia continued to smoulder in peat, reigniting the following February and starting the 2024 fires.

== Background ==
The frequency, intensity, and timing of wildfires in Canada have changed over time. In general, since the 1970s and 1980s, the total annual number of wildfires has decreased but the area burned in Canada has increased. Since 1959, the number of large fires greater than 200 ha (490 acres) has increased and the average fire season has become longer by about two weeks. In Canada, wildfire season usually starts in May. The 2023 fires were compared to the 2016 Fort McMurray wildfire and the 2021 Lytton wildfire.

The 2023 fire season was mainly driven by anthropogenic climate change, with temperatures in Canada from May to October 2.2 °C (4 °F) higher than the 1991–2020 average. Warmer and drier weather contributed to drought and desiccated vegetation, making it more flammable. In Western Canada, a drought from 2022 persisted and, along with low winter snowpack, led to dried out soil; in contrast, Nova Scotia and Quebec saw normal soil moisture levels but high temperatures and rapid drying caused a flash drought. Climate change made fire weather twice as likely and 20% more intense in Quebec according to estimates from World Weather Attribution, and made the unusually long nationwide fire season five times more likely.

Roughly half of all wildfires in Canada are caused by lightning; due to climate change, lightning-caused fires are happening more frequently, and lightning strikes are expected to double by the end of the century. In terms of wildfire acreage, lightning-caused fires account for about 85% of land burned. Lightning-caused fires often happen in clusters in remote locations. The other half of wildfires in Canada are human-caused, often unintentionally sparked by things such as discarded cigarette butts, abandoned smouldering campfires, sparks from braking trains, off-road vehicles, and land clearing activities. While false claims of arson gained traction on social media, arson is generally a minor cause of wildfires in Canada.

Forest management is also a factor in the wildfires. Because Canada's forest management has focused on fire suppression, dry vegetation has accumulated on the forest floor. Canada has generally stopped performing controlled burns, which help reduce the risk of larger and more dangerous fires. It is difficult to get permission for controlled burns, especially for Indigenous groups who have historically performed them and are disproportionately affected by wildfires. Canada lacks a national firefighting service, and local resources are stretched thin due to budget cuts.

Wind from a passing cold front during the week of May 18 exacerbated the fire risk, as did a concurrent heat wave in the west. Canadian Minister of Public Safety Bill Blair said: "These conditions, this early in the season, are unprecedented. Due to climate change, similar extreme weather events may continue to increase in both frequency and severity across our country."

== Wildfires ==
2023 Canadian wildfires by month
	Jan	Feb	Mar	Apr	May	Jun	Jul	Aug	Sep	Oct	Nov	Dec	Total
Number of Fires	0	0	0	432	1,434	1,473	1,827	966	467	425	0	0	7,024
Area burned (Ha)	0	0	0	91,438	2,517,854	5,291,321	4,075,352	2,255,114	378,641	3,934,988	0	0	18,544,708

The area burned in 2023 was more than twice that of any year since 1983. A study published in the journal Nature concluded that the June–September 2023 Canadian wildfires caused carbon emissions that exceeded annual fossil fuel emissions of all nations except India, China and the US.

=== Alberta ===
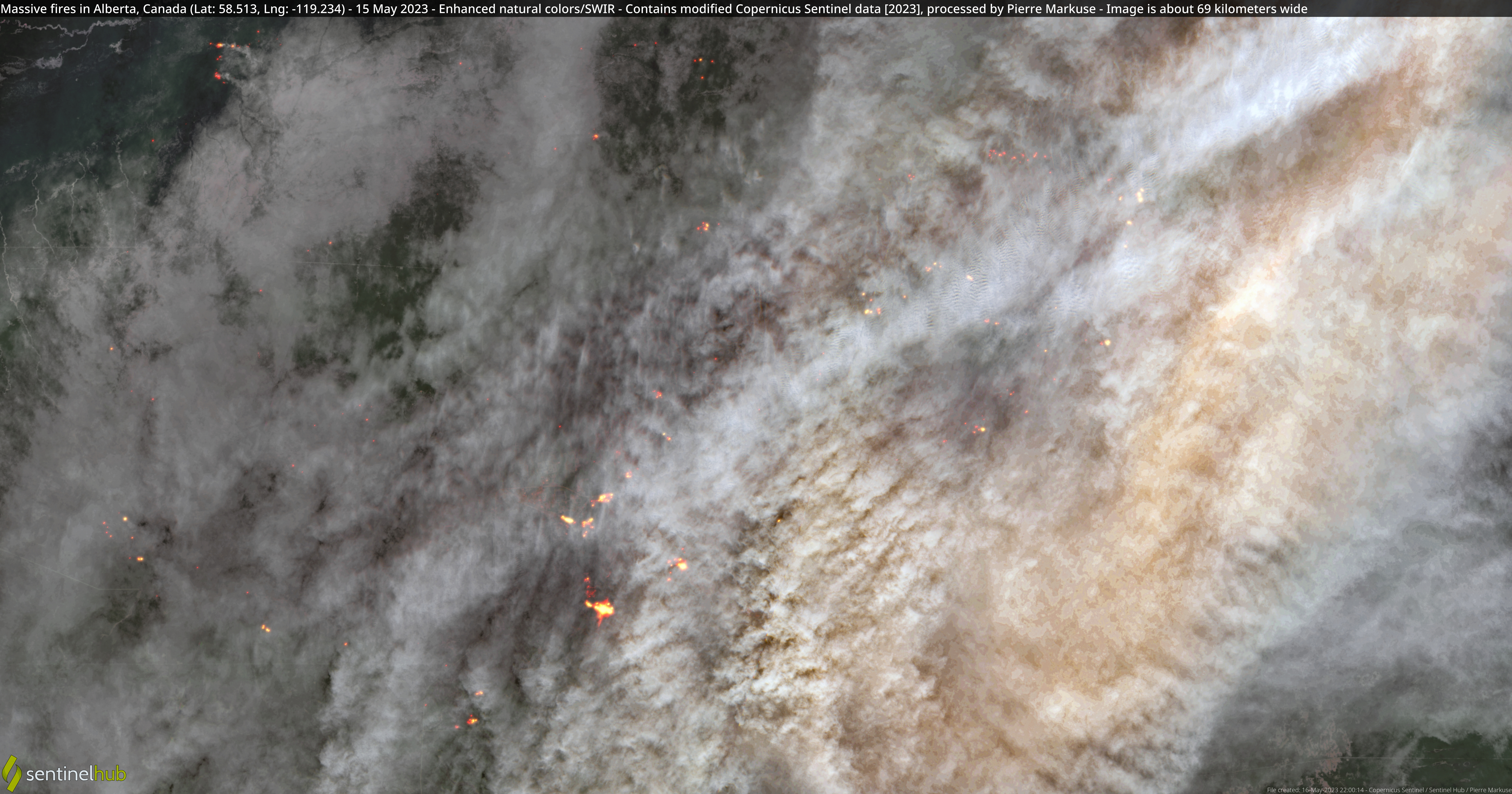
Alberta, covered in wildfire smoke (May 2023)

In May, Alberta was the province most impacted by wildfires. Most large wildfires in Alberta in 2023 were triggered by lightning. On May 6, the province of Alberta declared a provincial state of emergency. By May 7, 108 active fires were burning in the province. The provincial state of emergency ended on June 3. At the end of the fire season, the province recorded 1088 fires totalling 2,222,900 hectares (5,492,906 acres) burned.

==== High Level Forest Area ====
Two fires that were out of control in the High Level Forest Area were active on May 15.

HWF-036, named the Long Lake Fire, was a rapidly growing fire classified as out of control. It was the largest fire in the province during the 2023 wildfire season, having an active burning area of 108,402 hectares (267,867 acres). It was started just south of the Rainbow Lake Airport and initially grew to the northwest. However, due to multiple wind shifts over the following week, the fire began to spread in an eastward direction. On May 13, the fire made a 25-kilometre run towards the community of Chateh. This also resulted in Rainbow Lake being surrounded in all directions by the wildfire, as well as power and cell service being cut off. Alberta Wildfire, the Rainbow Lake Fire Department and other fire crews from Alaska and Ontario worked together to prevent the growth of the fire. They deployed 83 firefighters, four helicopters and other heavy equipment by May 15.

HWF-030, named the Paskwa Fire, was another out-of-control fire that spread eastward due to extreme conditions. It reached an active burning area of 35,285 hectares (87,191 acres). It was within the community of Fox Lake, and was 13 kilometres from the community of Garden River. The fire remained south of the Peace River. The extreme weather conditions made it hard for firefighters and aircraft to assist the fire. 76 firefighters and 13 helicopters were deployed as well as heavy equipment. A state of local emergency was declared for Fox Lake, followed by an evacuation order on May 3. An evacuation alert for Garden River was issued on May 13. Over 100 structures were destroyed in Fox Lake as of May 11.

HWF-042 was under control at 181 hectares (447 acres) on May 6. It was 1 kilometre (1 mi) north of the Highway 88 bridge over the Peace River. Highway 88 was closed on the afternoon of May 6 until one lane was opened later that day. Twelve firefighters and seven helicopters, heavy equipment and airtankers worked to prevent the fire from spreading further.

=== British Columbia ===
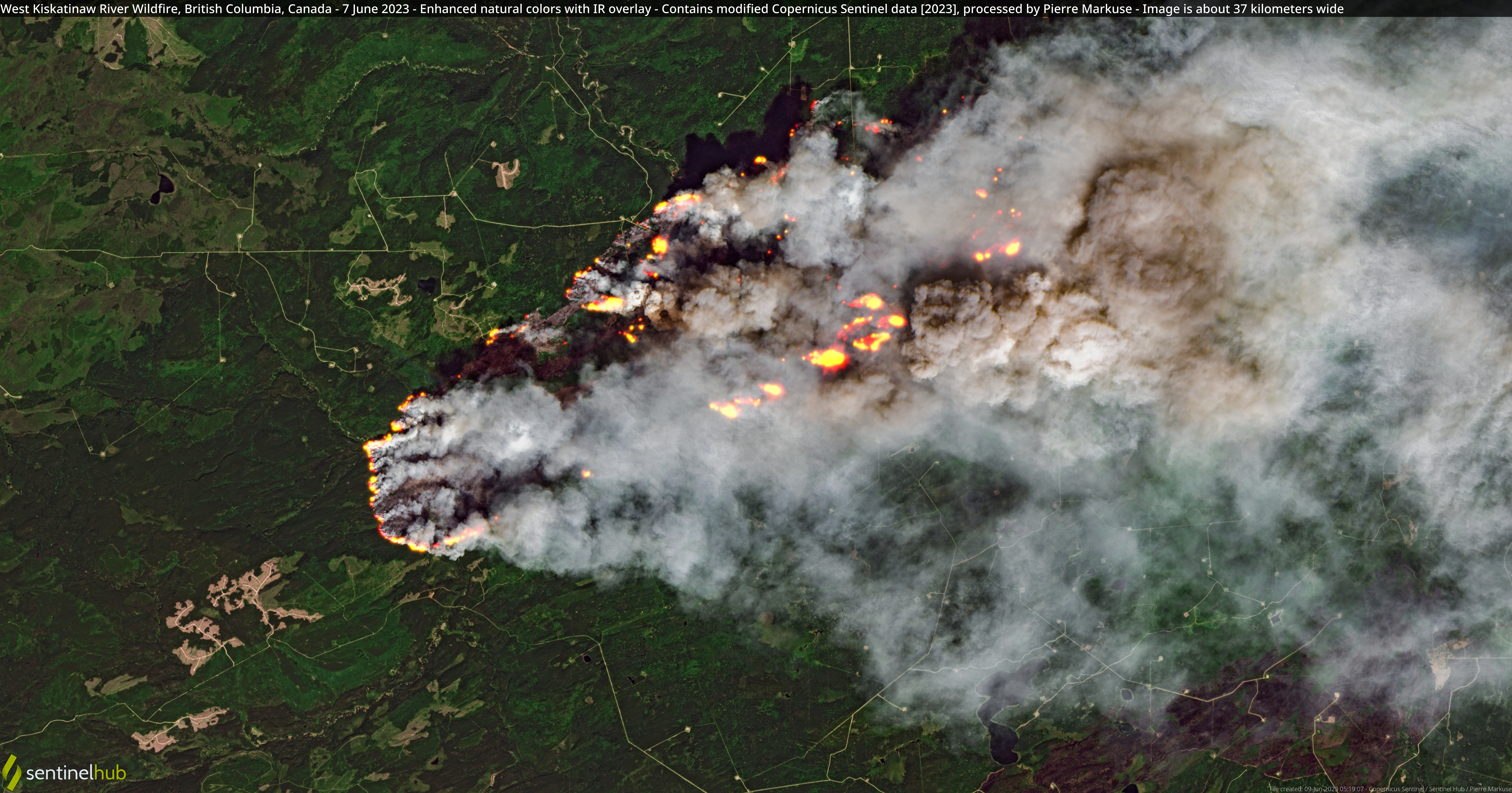
Kiskatinaw River wildfire in British Columbia (June 2023)

British Columbia saw an unusual lack of rain in May and early June, leading to increased wildfire conditions in the province. In British Columbia, 72% of wildfires in 2023 were triggered by natural causes, while the remainder were due to human activity. In a study of British Columbia's 2017 fire season, researchers found that human-caused climate change had a strong influence on the amount of area burned. The final tally of wildfires in British Columbia for 2023 was 2293 fires and 2,840,104 hectares (7,018,050 acres) burned.

In early June, the province saw multiple wildfires in or near Peachland and on Vancouver Island near both Port Alberni and Sayward. As of June 2, there were 54 active fires in the region. Officials estimated about half of the province's wildfires were caused by human action. In the west of Vancouver Island, highway access to the towns of Port Alberni, Tofino, and Ucluelet was cut off for more than two weeks due to the Cameron Bluffs wildfire.

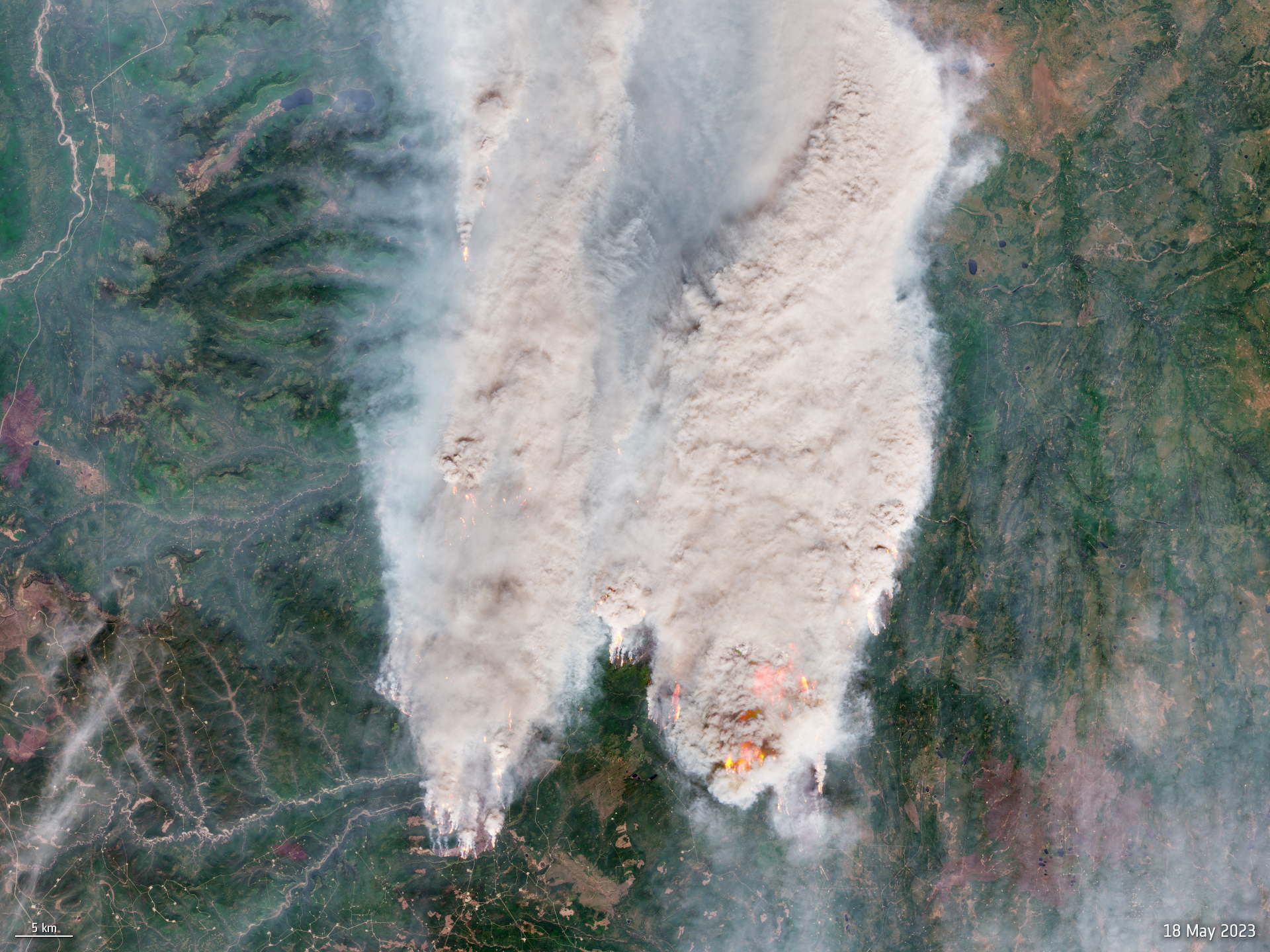
Donnie Creek fire (May 2023)

In northeastern British Columbia, the Donnie Creek wildfire became the single largest wildfire in BC history. It attained this status on June 18. By June 24, the fire was burning over an area of greater than 5,648 square kilometres (2,180 square miles).

There were 377 active wildfires in British Columbia as of July 15, including 20 that were classified as "highly visible, threatening or potentially damaging 'wildfires of note'". Unruly blazes destroyed properties and closed parts of the Trans-Canada highway .

August saw several very destructive wildfires in the southern Interior region. Two fires, the Bush Creek East wildfire in the Shuswap area, and the McDougall Creek wildfire, south of Kelowna, caused heavy damage to structures and forced major evacuations. The two fires, which burned concurrently, caused 730 million CAD in insured damages, ranking as the most costly extreme weather event in the province's history.

Between July and October 21, much of BC had seen less than a quarter of usual rainfall, with Vancouver at 10% and Victoria recording only 2 millimetres of rain instead of its normal average of 132 mm. As of October 21, there were still 202 active wildfires.

Many of the BC wildfires of note from the 2023 wildfire season were featured in a five-part documentary series entitled Wildfire (2025 TV series) that aired on Knowledge Network throughout April and May 2025. This includes the Donnie Creek wildfire and McDougall Creek wildfire.

=== Manitoba ===
As of June 6, there had been 70 fires in Manitoba, below the province's average number for that point in the season. Compared to past years, human caused fires were less frequent, with lightning causing the majority. As of May 27, there were six active wildfires in the province, including a fire near Cross Lake First Nation and Pimicikamak Cree Nation. On June 2, Manitoba only had three wildfires active in the province. Lightning over June 3 and 4 raised the total fire count to 12 by June 5, and to 14 by June 6. Of those, four were considered out of control. On June 6, officials were focused on monitoring and containing fires near Little Grand Rapids, Pauingassi First Nation, and St. Theresa Point First Nation.

=== New Brunswick ===
New Brunswick had experienced 177 wildfires as of June 7, including fires in West Branch, Alnwick Parish, and Valley Road in Kars. A fire near Saint Andrews, which had started on May 28, was brought under control on June 5.

=== Newfoundland and Labrador ===
Newfoundland and Labrador saw 34 wildfires before May 1, far outpacing the 2022 season, which saw only 2 fires in that same period. This was attributed to dry conditions. Between May 1 and 19, 19 other fires were recorded. Wet conditions in early June created a low fire risk for Newfoundland, allowing water bombers from Newfoundland to be deployed to assist with firefighting efforts in Labrador, Nova Scotia and Quebec.

On June 8, there were 72 active wildfires in the province.

=== Northwest Territories ===
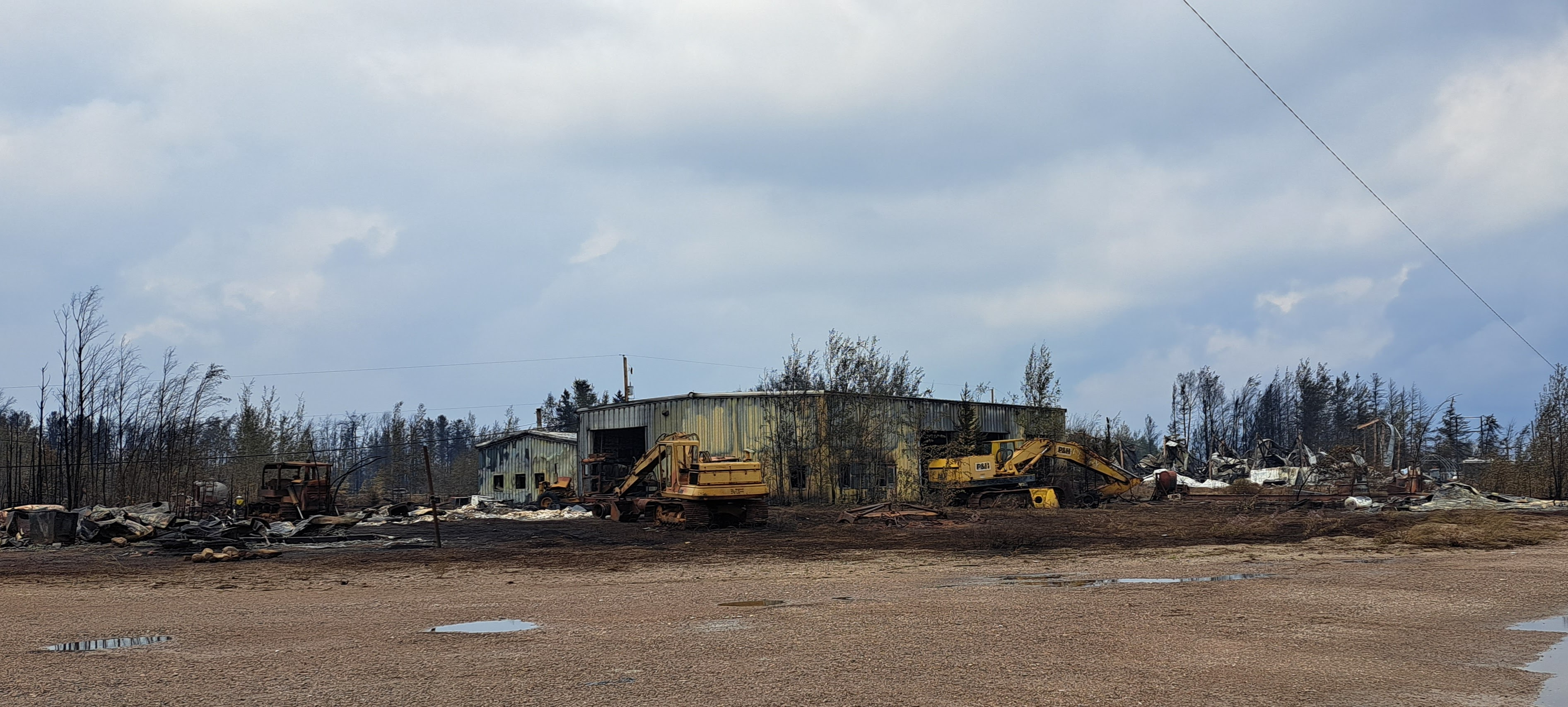
Enterprise, Northwest Territories after the wildfires (August 2023)

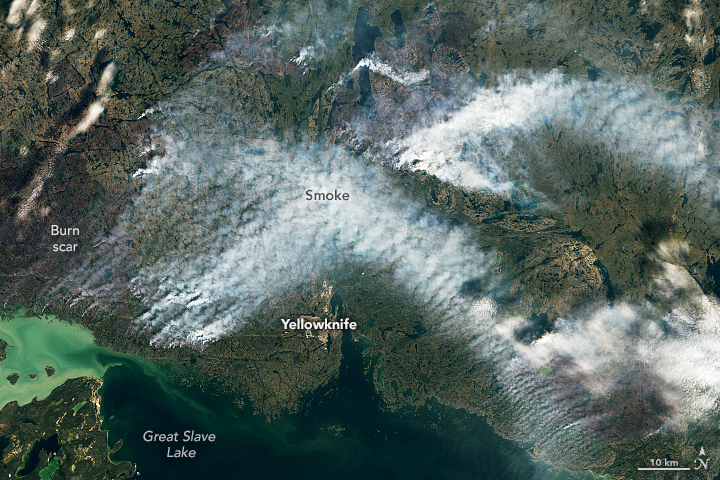
Wildfires surrounding Yellowknife, Northwest Territories (August 2023)

On June 7, there were eleven active wildfires in the Northwest Territories. At that point, there had been 21 total fires, affecting 403,815 hectares (997,850 acres). By August 15, there were over 230 wildfires throughout the territory. By August 17, they were within 17 km (11 mi) of the capital city, Yellowknife, leading to an evacuation order. The wildfires caused telecommunication and internet signals to be cut off throughout the South Slave Region, which led to concerns about the feasibility of a safe evacuation.

By August 23, wildfires in the territory had produced 97 megatonnes of carbon, accounting for roughly a fourth of the total 327 megatonnes produced by Canada's wildfires in 2023.

=== Nova Scotia ===
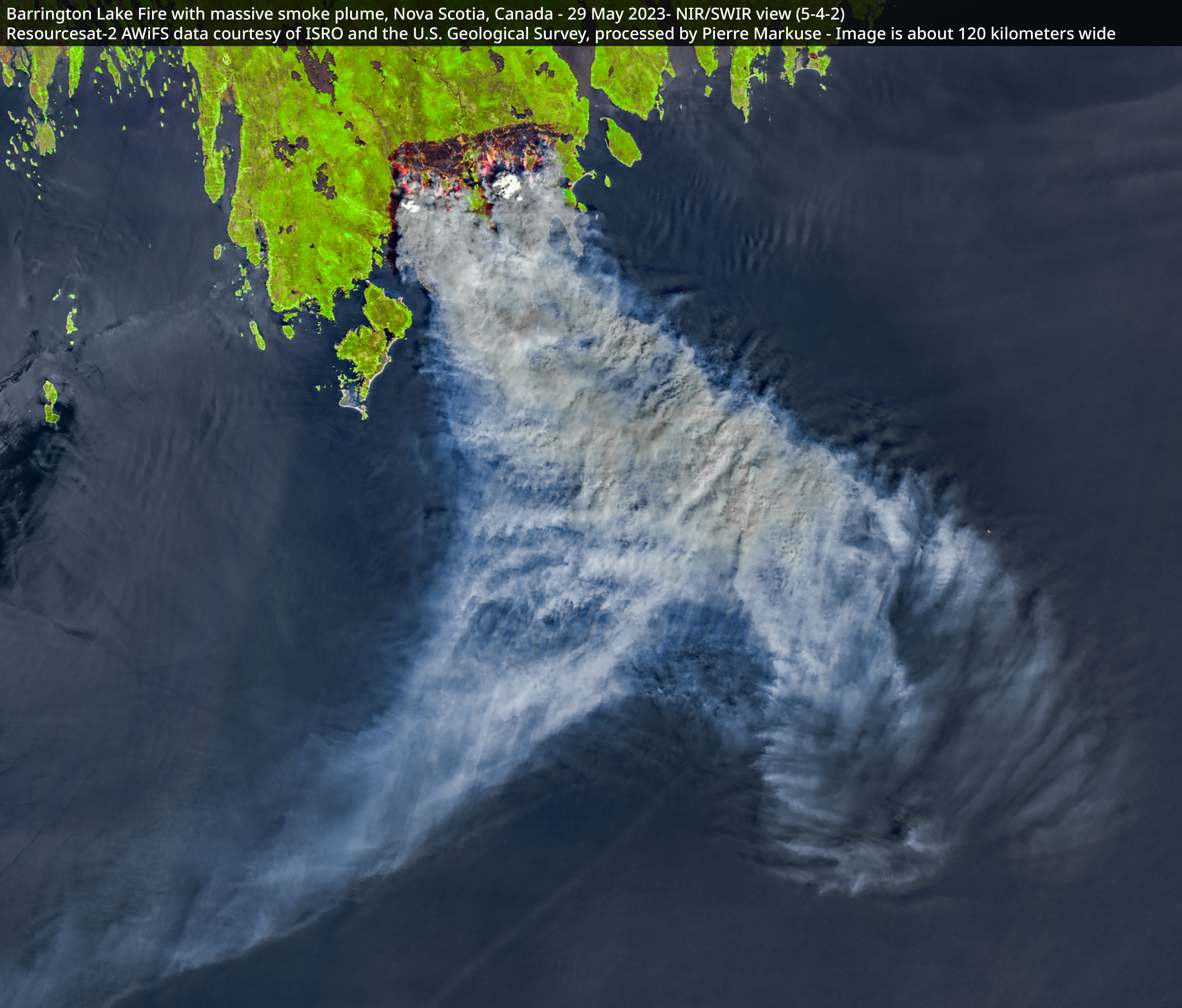
Plume of smoke from Nova Scotia's Barrington Lake wildfire (May 2023)

Nova Scotia saw the largest recorded wildfires in its history. On average, in Nova Scotia, only about 3% of wildfires are caused by lightning, with the remaining being caused by human activity. Of those caused by human activity, about a third of Nova Scotia's fires are caused by people on or near their own property, and about a quarter are caused by arson. On June 1, there were four out-of-control fires in the province.
The fires that started in the Tantallon area were caused by a resident who was burning debris in their yard. The resident was warned by the fire department, but continued to burn debris until it got out of control.
The fires that started in the Shelburne area were caused by three residents who were lighting tires on fire and rolling them down a hill. Once word of their actions got out they fled the province for their safety.
As of January 18, 2024 charges have been laid in relation to the Shelburne wildfire.
In suburban Halifax, an estimated 200 structures were destroyed by fire. By June 1, the Halifax fire was 50% contained, but was not considered under control. At the time, no missing people or injuries from the Halifax fire were reported. By June 4, the Halifax fire was 100% contained. The Barrington Lake fire in Shelburne County, which started May 27, covered 230 square kilometres (89 sq mi) at its largest. On June 7, officials announced it was successfully contained. As of June 7, the fire had destroyed 60 residences and 150 other structures.

==== Barrington Lake wildfire ====
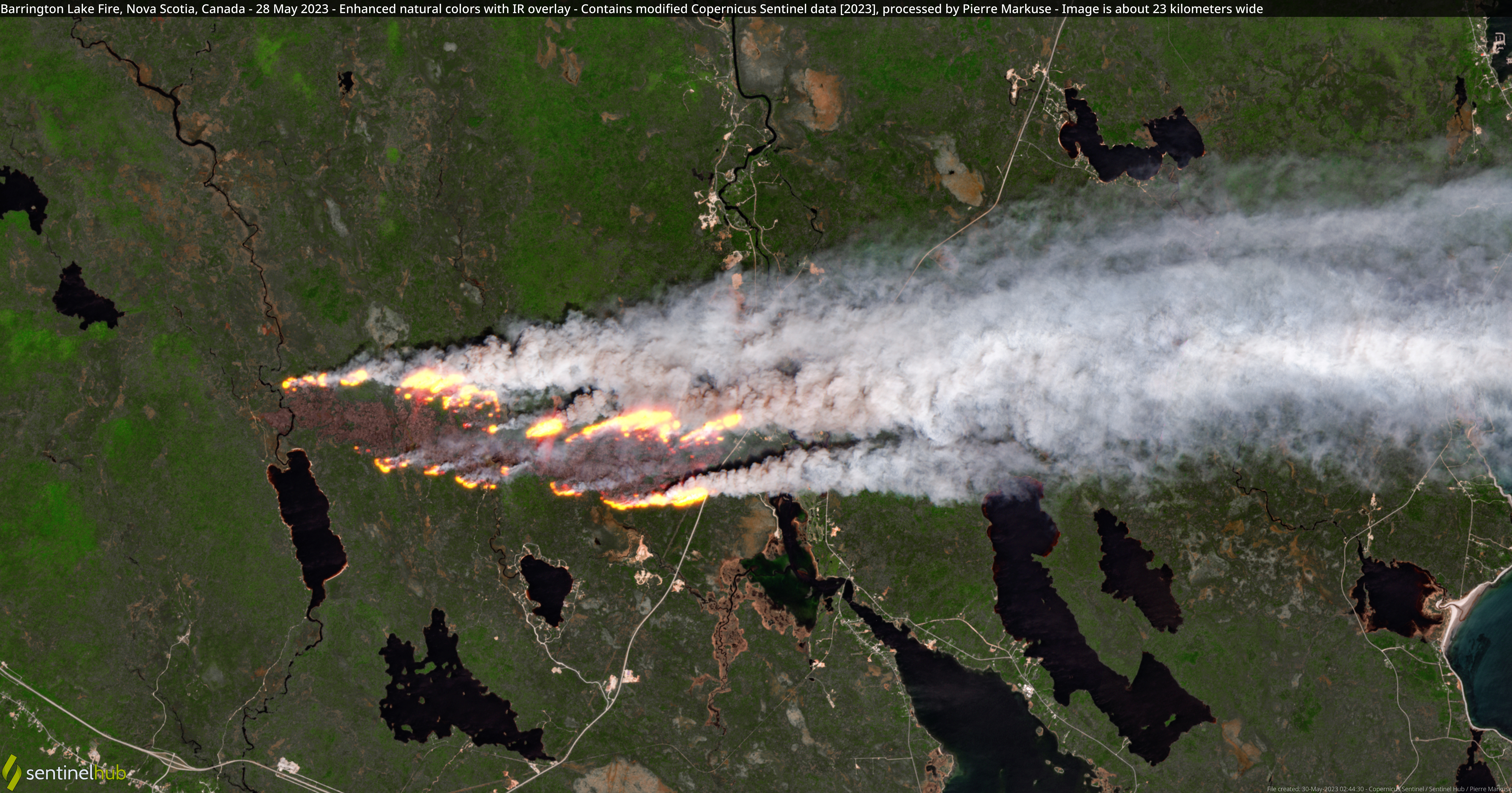
Barrington Lake wildfire

A major wildfire started around May 27 near Barrington Lake in Shelburne County. The fire burned around 23,015 hectares (56,871 acres) and between 30 and 40 structures were destroyed. The response to the fire included widespread evacuation orders of the surrounding area, displacing around 5000 people. This wildfire was the largest recorded in the history of Nova Scotia.

Efforts to stop the fire includes the use of American water bombers and additional firefighters from the U.S. and Costa Rica.

==== Tantallon wildfire ====
A second major wildfire in the Tantallon area was first reported at 3:30 pm on May 28. It spread rapidly through the Westwood Hills subdivision throughout the evening. The fire burned through 950 hectares (2,300 acres) as of June 2. Halifax mayor Mike Savage described the response to the fire as "unprecedented" in the area. Approximately 16,400 people were placed under mandatory evacuation orders in the surrounding areas. Preliminary reports stated that approximately 151 houses were destroyed and 50 other structures were damaged or destroyed. As of June 3 the fire was declared "largely contained" with help from the Canadian military and a heavy rainstorm.

=== Ontario ===
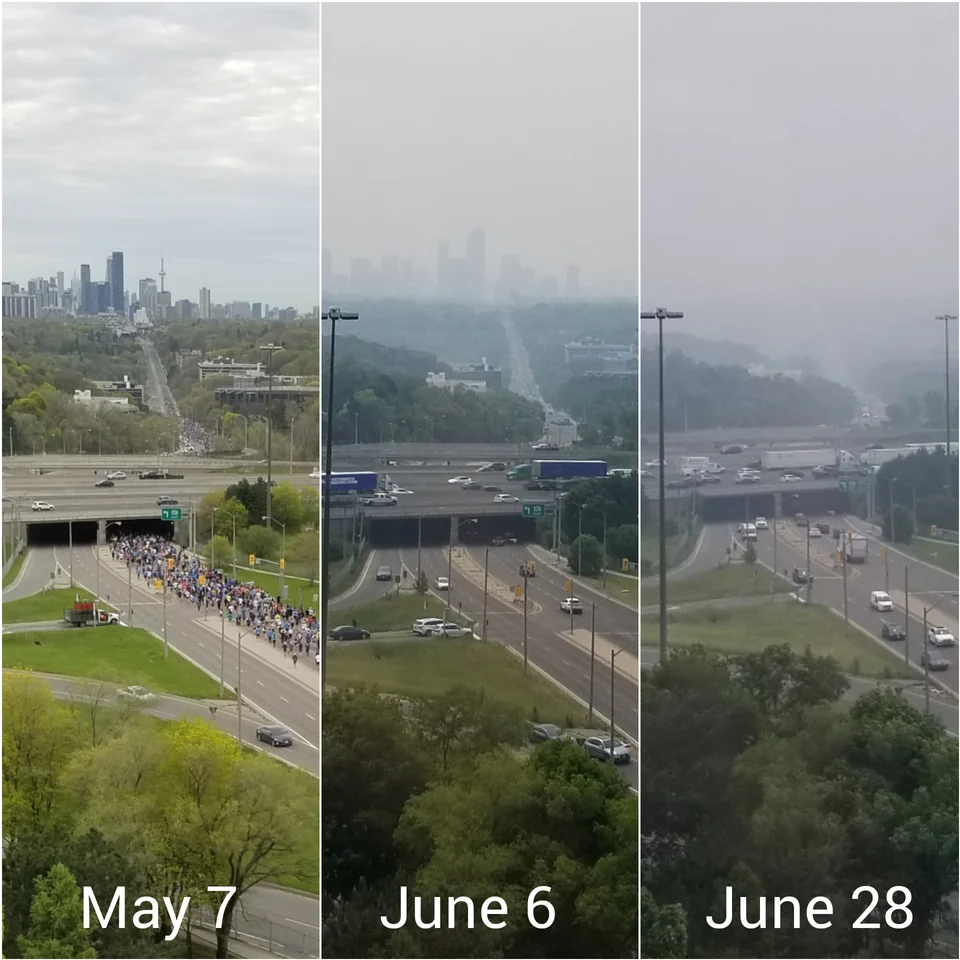
Comparison of smoke over Toronto during May and June.

Smoke from the fires caused air quality in Ottawa, Toronto, as well as most of Southern Ontario on June 5–7 to hit the highest level on Environment Canada's Air Quality Health Index, the worst in the province of Ontario. Air quality also hit the highest level in Kingston and Belleville, Ontario.

Smoke from the fires descended on Ottawa once again on June 25–26, reaching the maximum level by 11 am. This forced the city of Ottawa to cancel outdoor programs, races at the Ottawa Dragon Boat Festival were cancelled, as were activities at the Ottawa Summer Solstice Indigenous Festival.

On June 28, the air quality in Toronto ranked among the worst in the world and once again reached the highest level on Environment Canada's Air Quality Health Index. This forced a number of city-run outdoor recreation programs to move indoors.

=== Quebec ===
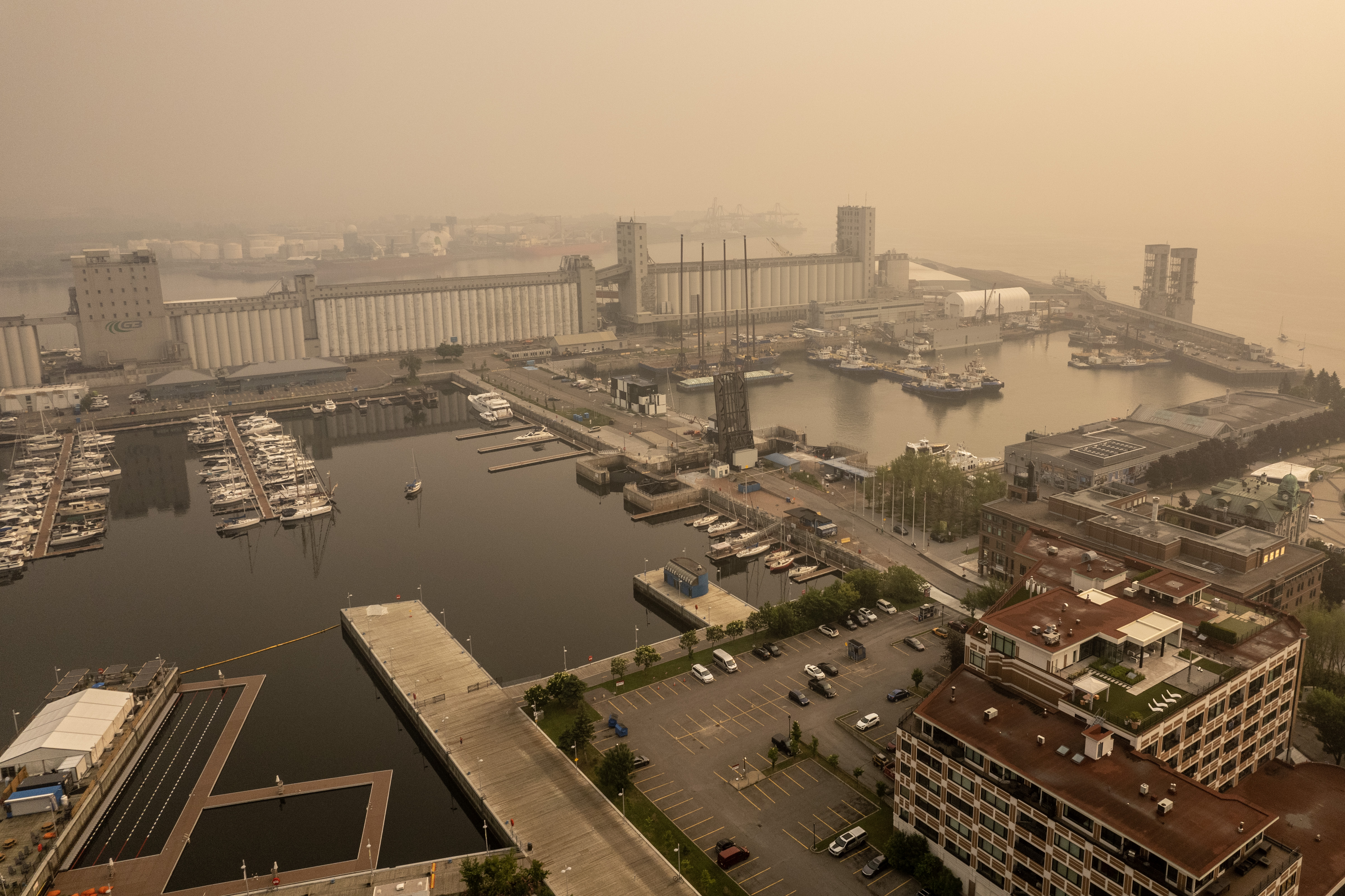
The Port of Quebec in Quebec City covered in wildfire smoke (June 25, 2023)

Quebec was particularly hard hit during the 2023 wildfire season, with more frequent wildfires than in the past, and fewer resources and experience with which to fight them. It saw the most area burned of any province with 5.2 million ha (13 million acres). As of June 10, the province had reported 446 fires, compared to the average of 212 for the same date.

On June 8, 137 fires were active in Quebec and 54 in Ontario.

On the afternoon of June 25, Montreal had the worst air quality in the world due to wildfire smoke in the region; several cultural and sporting events were cancelled or postponed in response.

=== Saskatchewan ===
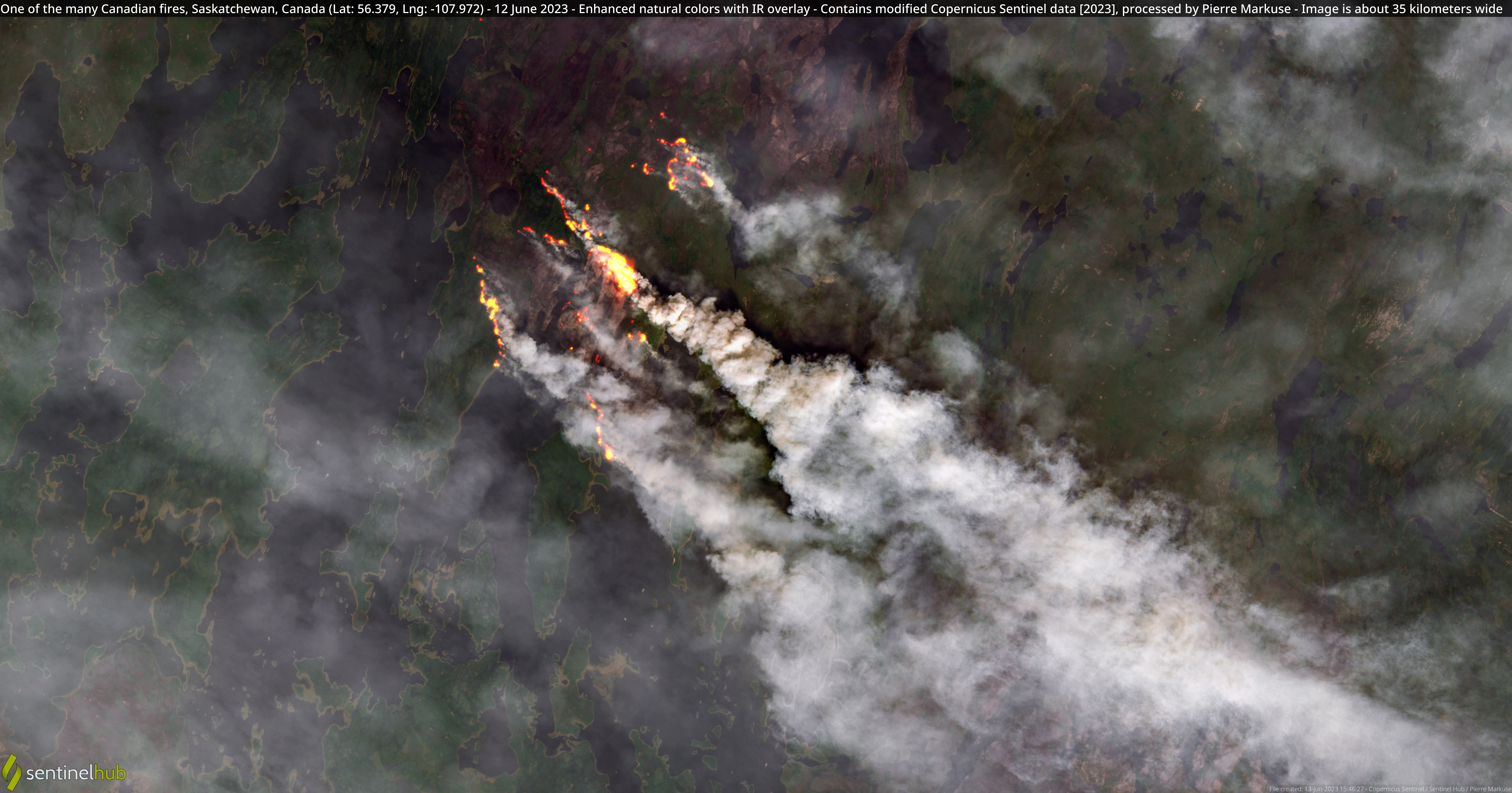
Wildfires in Saskatchewan (June 2023)

Like other regions, Saskatchewan had a dry spring, leading to increased risk for wildfires. By May 25, the province had seen 187 fires; the five-year average for that point in the season is 111. Firefighting crews struggled due to heavy smoke, which made it difficult both for crews to travel and to monitor the fires.

Some communities, although not directly in the path of any fires, lost power due to fires in the region, particularly from May 14 to 17.

== Domestic impacts ==
=== Evacuations ===
Estimates of the number of displaced vary. The Internal Displacement Monitoring Centre estimated that 185,000 people were displaced, representing 43% of worldwide wildfire-related displacements for 2023. Forty-three thousand of those were in Alberta, and 59,000 were in British Columbia. The State of Wildfires report estimated that 232,000 were evacuated.

==== Alberta evacuations ====
Multiple settlements were placed under evacuation orders, resulting in over 29,000 Albertans being evacuated by May 7. On May 11, at least 300 members of the Canadian Armed Forces were sent to different parts of Alberta to help.

Evacuation orders were issued for multiple communities throughout the province. On April 29, mandatory evacuation orders were issued for the towns of Evansburg and Entwistle, due to two wildfires in their vicinity. The evacuation order was lifted on May 3, only for it to be reinstated on May 4, due to the fires increasing in size.

The community of Fox Lake, on the Fox Lake 162 reserve, was issued an evacuation order May 3, with all residents being evacuated by May 5. As of May 11, the local police station, general store, and at least 100 homes had been destroyed by fire. The town of Drayton Valley, approximately 133 km (83 mi) southwest of Edmonton, was issued an evacuation order on May 4. The local fire department reported that one structure had been lost.

On May 5, the hamlet of Nordegg and the Big Horn 144A reserve were issued an evacuation order due to nearby wildfires. Also on May 5, evacuation orders were issued for the town of Edson due to multiple nearby wildfires. On May 6, the town of Fox Creek and the hamlet of Little Smoky were issued an evacuation order.

On May 13, the community of Chateh issued an evacuation order due to the Long Lake Fire (HWF-036) making a 25 km (16 mi) run toward the community. On May 14, the community of Chipewyan Lake was issued an evacuation order due to an out-of-control wildfire starting north of the community.

Residents of Rainbow Lake were allowed to return on June 2.

More than 3,000 Albertans remained under evacuation orders as of June 8. On June 9, residents of Edson and Yellowhead County were asked to evacuate.

==== British Columbia evacuations ====
In early May, some British Columbia residents evacuated their homes due to out-of-control wildfires there. Around May 22, residents were evacuated from near Tzenzaicut Lake, which is about 600 km (373 mi) north of Vancouver. In early June, officials recommended that British Columbians be prepared to evacuate if need be. On June 7, the community of One Island Lake was evacuated. On June 8, the community of Tumbler Ridge was evacuated. As of July 15, there were nearly 70 evacuation orders across the province.

In August, premier David Eby declared a state of emergency as the city of West Kelowna was evacuated when the McDougall Creek wildfire grew to cover 6,800 hectares. The campus of UBC Okanagan and some nearby suburbs were placed under evacuation order. Overall, at least 35,000 people were under evacuation order and another 30,000 under evacuation alert, as of August 19. By the end of the season, a total of 208 evacuation orders had caused over 48,000 people to leave their homes.

==== Manitoba evacuations ====
Approximately 7,000 members of the Pimicikamak Cree Nation were evacuated on May 24; most residents were able to return by May 26.

==== Northwest Territories evacuations ====
The Katl'odeeche First Nation (Hay River Reserve) and the residents of Hay River were evacuated on May 14. The 3,000 residents of Hay River were allowed to return on May 24, while the 300 members of the K'at'lodeeche First Nation were not able to return until June 7. On May 31, the residents of Sambaa K'e were evacuated to Fort Simpson.

On August 14, authorities in the Northwest Territories declared a state of emergency and issued another evacuation order to communities throughout the Dehcho, South Slave, and North Slave Regions, including those in Behchokǫ̀, Enterprise, Fort Smith, Hay River, Kakisa, the Kátł'odeeche First Nation and Jean Marie River. Hundreds of people were airlifted out of the wildfire zone with the assistance of the Canadian Armed Forces. Stanton Territorial Hospital ramped down its health services and began sending some of its patients to St. Albert, Alberta.

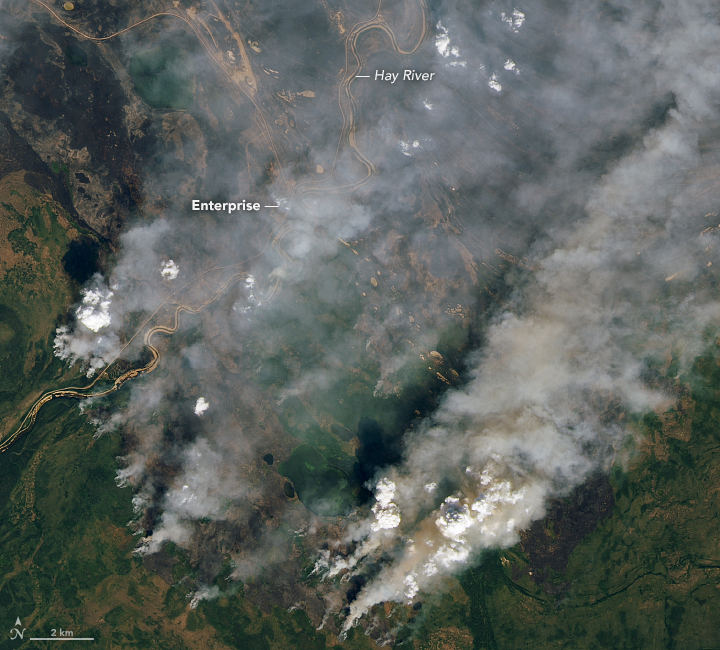
Wildfires near Enterprise and Hay River (August 2023)

By the evening of August 15, Yellowknife itself began issuing precautionary evacuation alerts to parts of the city, as the wildfire began drawing closer. On the same day, Michael St Amour, the mayor of Enterprise, said that between 85 and 90% of his town was destroyed by the fires. On the evening of August 16, evacuation orders were issued for Yellowknife, N’dilo, Dettah, and Ingraham Trail, affecting an estimated 22,000 people.

On August 19, 87% of Yellowknife was evacuated by 6:58 am (ET), with only 2,600 of the original 20,000 remaining, 1,000 of which were essential workers. By August 21, 68% of the population of the Northwest Territories had been evacuated.

Air Canada and WestJet were initially criticized for high prices and unwaived cancellation fees for flights to and from Yellowknife; they had since changed policies to alleviate financial burden for evacuees as of August 17. Both carriers also increased the number of flights to Yellowknife.

The evacuation order for Yellowknife, Dettah and N’dilo was rescinded September 6, and people began to return to Yellowknife later that day. An estimated 1,000 people had been flown home by September 8.

==== Nova Scotia evacuations ====
In late May, the communities of Hammonds Plains, Pockwock, and Upper Tantallon were put under evacuation orders. 16,000 residents were evacuated from Halifax. The Halifax Regional Municipality opened several centres for evacuees. On June 2, some residents were permitted to briefly return to their homes to survey damage. Due to safety risks, none were allowed to return permanently. This was a source of frustration for evacuees, along with what some residents deemed to be "communication failures" from the provincial government.

Residents near Shelburne were evacuated on May 31; the total number of evacuees from Shelburne County numbered about 5,000. Several local farmers also evacuated their animals to the county's exhibition grounds. Nova Scotia provided free camping at several locations for people displaced by the fire in Shelburne.

==== Quebec evacuations ====
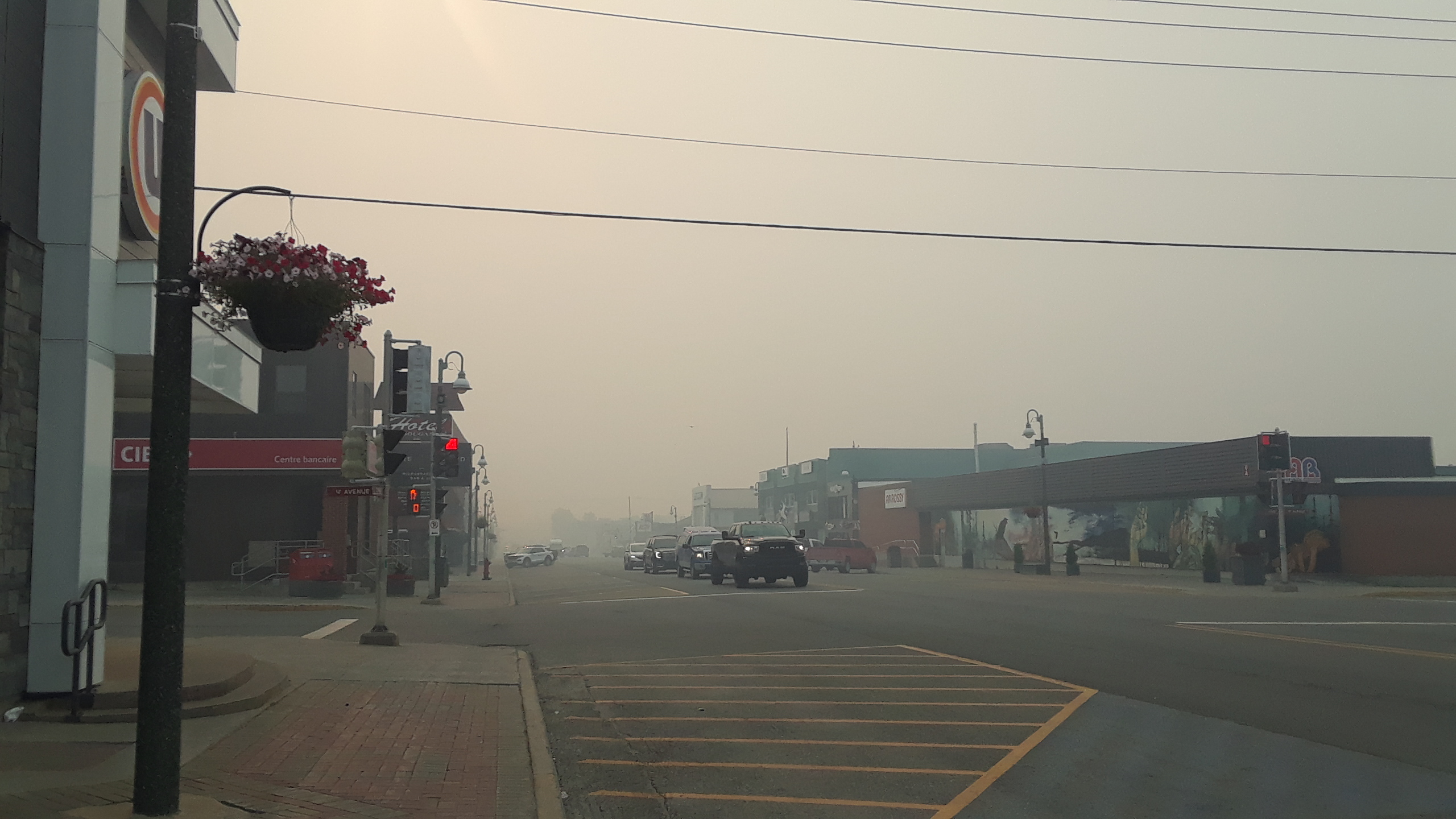
Chibougamau, Quebec, clouded in smoke from the Nord-du-Québec wildfires (June 2023)

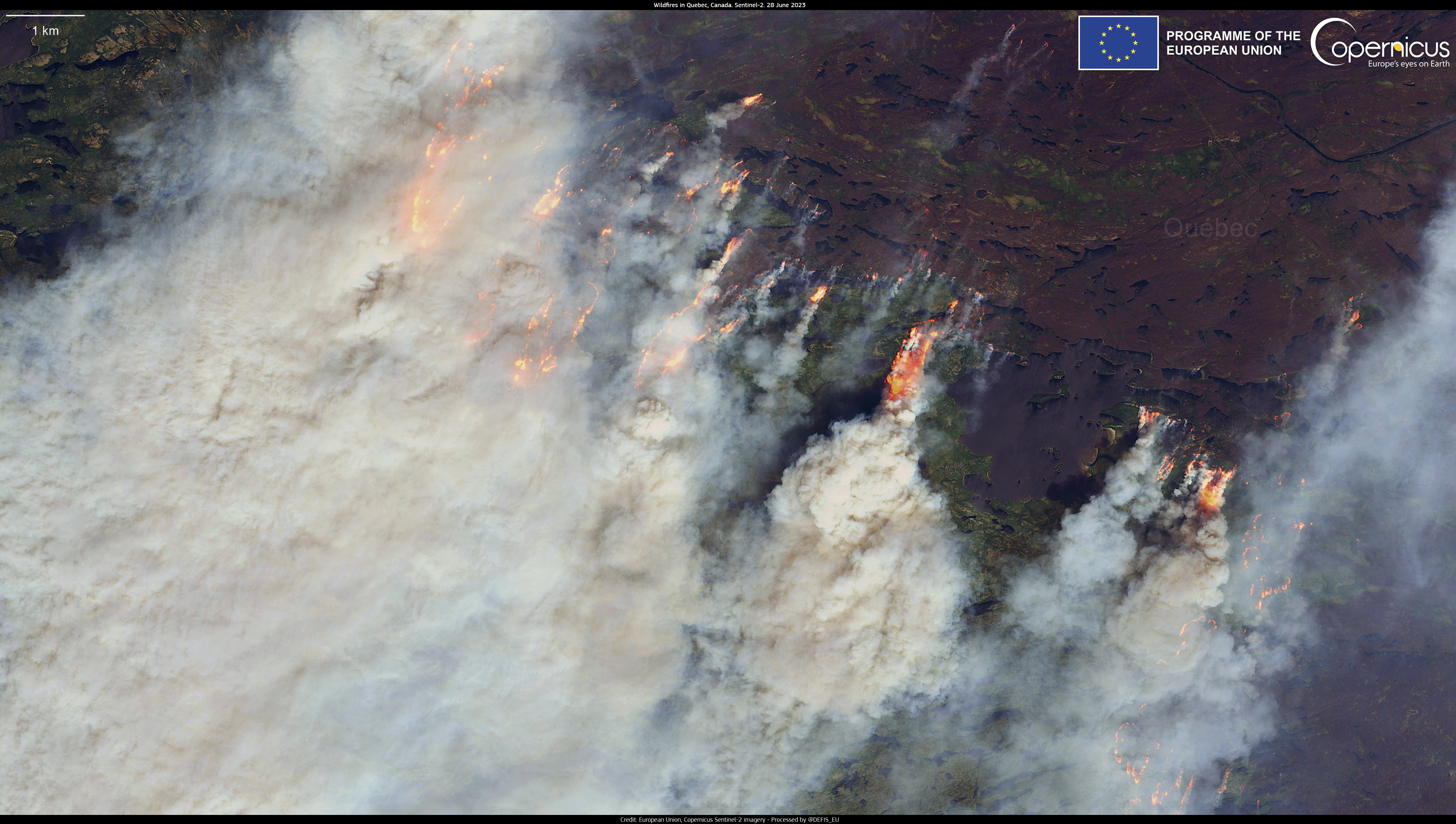
Huge clouds of smoke caused by wildfires in Quebec (June 2023)

As of June 4, 14,000 residents had been evacuated from their homes in Quebec. On June 6, 7,500 residents were evacuated from Chibougamau, the largest town in Northern Quebec. On June 7, the nearby Cree Nation of Mistissini was asked to evacuate, and the Cree Nation of Waswanipi began evacuating of their own accord.

On June 6, Quebec's Public Security Ministry announced a large evacuation alert for the province, prompting towns such as Chapais to immediately evacuate citizens. The mayor of Lebel-sur-Quévillon, where about 2,100 people (or the entire city's population) were forced from their homes, stated that the fires were as close as 10 km (6.2 mi) from the city.

On June 23, more than 300 residents were evacuated from Val-Paradis, Beaucanton and Lac Pajegasque; they were permitted to return on June 25. On June 23 the Cree community of Mistissini asked residents to evacuate for the second time that month. The Atikamekw of Opitciwan were allowed to return on June 26.

==== Saskatchewan evacuations ====
On May 15, 535 residents of Buffalo Narrows evacuated. Other evacuated communities included the Buffalo River Dene Nation, the English River First Nation, the Lac La Ronge Indian Band, and the Canoe Lake First Nation.

By May 18, the Saskatchewan Public Safety Agency (SPSA) was supporting around 1,000 evacuees from effected regions of the province, who were temporarily housed in Lloydminster, North Battleford, and Regina. Support provided included food, clothing, housing, and other required services. The number of evacuees at the time was higher than 1,000, as the SPSA was not supporting individuals who evacuated of their own accord or who made separate housing plans.

Many residents in Deschambault Lake evacuated in mid-May. Evacuees from Île-à-la-Crosse and Buffalo Narrows received assistance from the University of Regina.

=== Other domestic impacts ===
==== Economic ====
In mid-May, oil companies in Alberta, British Columbia, and Saskatchewan curbed production as a precautionary measure in parts of the provinces; this in turn drove up the price of oil. The cost of drought and wildfires in Alberta totaled $2.9 billion.

Many businesses were affected by evacuations, road closures, and travel advisories from countries warning residents not to travel to Canada. A report from Innovation, Science and Economic Development Canada (ISED) noted that British Columbia was hit especially hard, with tourist destinations such as Tofino suffered from collapsing hotel occupancy rates, and that by September 2023 the fires had cost Canada over $3 billion. The effects continued into 2024 as travellers became reluctant to book trips in advance in case of fires.

==== Political ====
The wildfires impacted the Alberta general election scheduled for May 29. The Alberta New Democratic Party announced the party would stop campaigning in the seven ridings hit particularly hard by the fires: Drayton Valley-Devon, Lesser Slave Lake, Central Peace-Notley, Lac Ste. Anne-Parkland, Fort Saskatchewan-Vegreville, West Yellowhead, and Grande Prairie-Wapiti.

== International effects ==
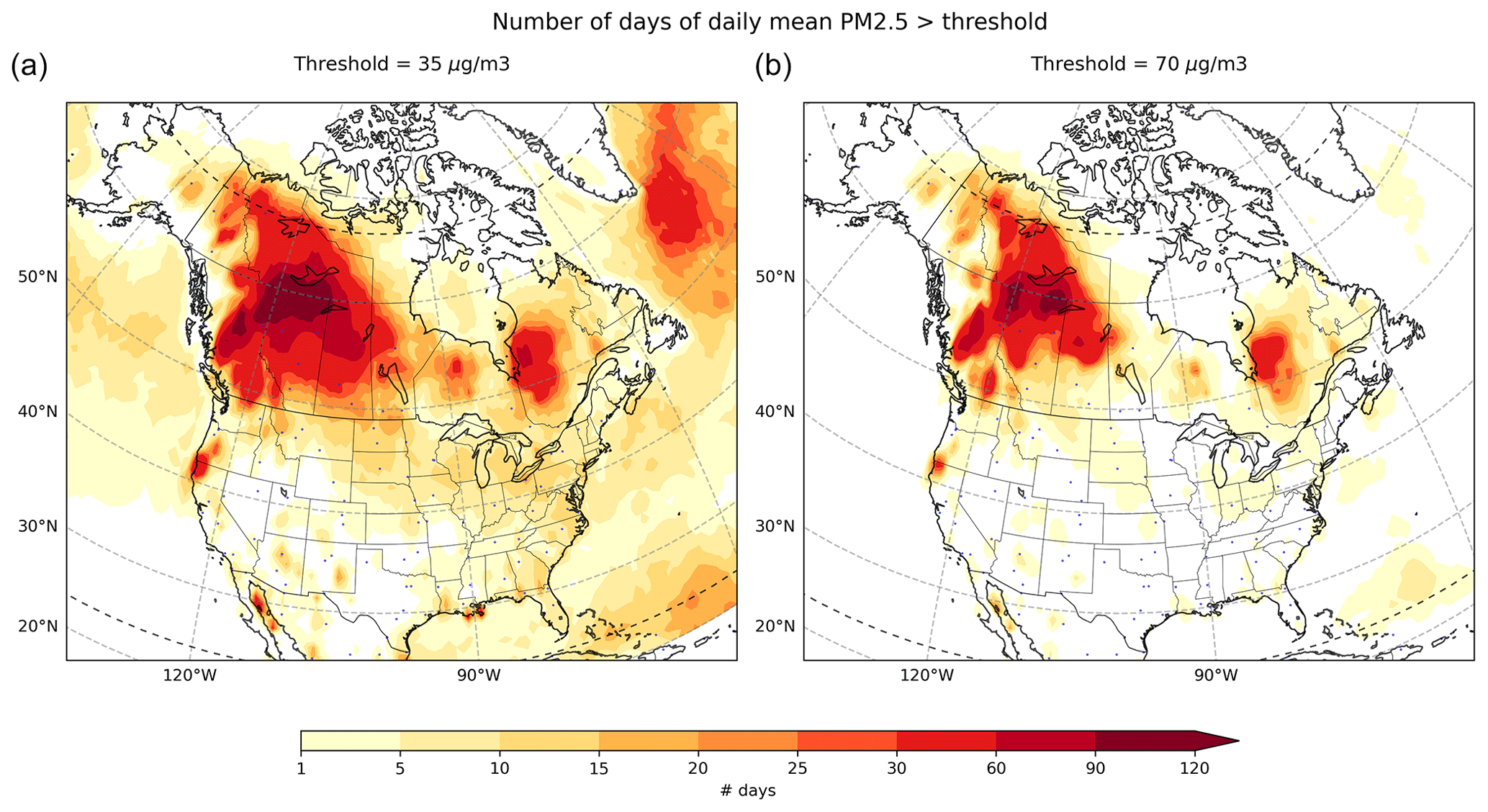
A map of Canada and the United States showing the number of days where PM2.5 levels exceeded safe limits.

=== Effects on environment and climate ===
Pollution due to a global increase in wildfires has created widespread, long-term impacts on human health. Due to wildfire emissions, Canada broke its record for annual carbon emissions in late June. As of late August, the wildfires had released 327–355 megatonnes of carbon into the atmosphere. The emissions from the fires were more than double Canada's planned emissions reductions from 2020 to 2030. According to Merritt Turetsky, a carbon cycle scientist, this is a "vicious cycle" as warming is associated with drier vegetation, drier vegetation ignites more rapidly, greenhouse gases are released, and greenhouse gases "wind up in the atmosphere, [causing] more warming".

Scientists from the World Resources Institute and the University of Maryland estimated the overall emissions as 3.28bn tons (2.98 metric tons) more than fossil fuel emissions of India. According to professor Jacob Bendix, "The loss of that much forest is a very big deal, and very worrisome", "Although the forest will eventually grow back and sequester carbon in doing so, that is a process that will take decades at a minimum, so that there is a quite substantial lag between addition of atmospheric carbon due to wildfire and the eventual removal of at least some of it by the regrowing forest. So, over the course of those decades, the net impact of the fires is a contribution to climate warming". The fires represented over a quarter of global tree loss in 2023, and the Copernicus Atmosphere Monitoring Service estimated that they produced 23% of global wildfire carbon emissions in 2023.

Canadian wildfires were also a significant source of light-absorbing black carbon and brown carbon aerosol particles, which have a strong impact on climate. Cooler temperatures caused by the smoke may have also led to low-pressure systems that disrupted monsoons in India, leading August 2023 to be unusually dry. In North America and Europe, an estimated 354 million people experienced at least one day where PM2.5 concentrations exceeded healthy levels, with Canadians experiencing an average of 27 days. The smoke was also estimated to have caused 5,400 immediate deaths in North America and 64,300 chronic deaths in North America and Europe.

=== United States ===
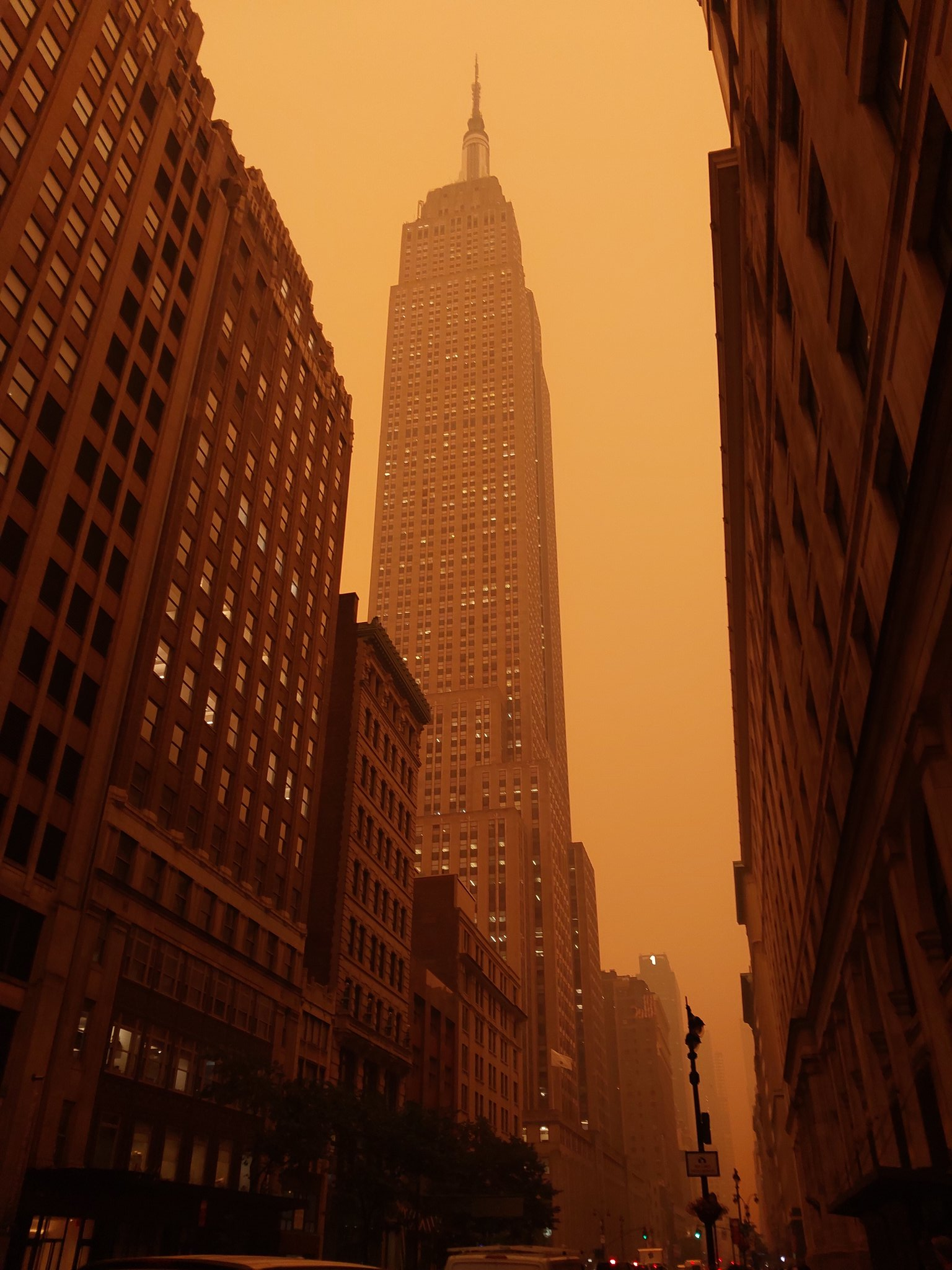
The Empire State Building seen from the ground on June 7

The fires had severe impacts throughout the United States. Air quality dropped to hazardous levels, leading to school closures and cancellations of public events. Reduced visibility led to flight delays and cancellations and reductions in speed limits on roads. Multiple cities were temporarily recorded as having the worst air quality in the world. During May and June, much of the Upper Midwest experienced the highest ozone levels ever recorded at a regional scale. In Maryland, there was a spike in cardiopulmonary medical events during the days with the worst air pollution (June 6–8 and 28–30). A retrospective study of patients with end-stage kidney disease in 22 states found smoke from the fires increased hospitalization and mortality rates.

==== May ====
In May, the Minnesota Pollution Control Agency issued several alerts for poor air quality due to smoke from Alberta and Saskatchewan fires and ground-level ozone. Smoke from the Alberta wildfires led to air quality alerts in Colorado, Montana, Nebraska, North Dakota, South Dakota, Utah, Wisconsin, and Washington by May 21.

==== June ====
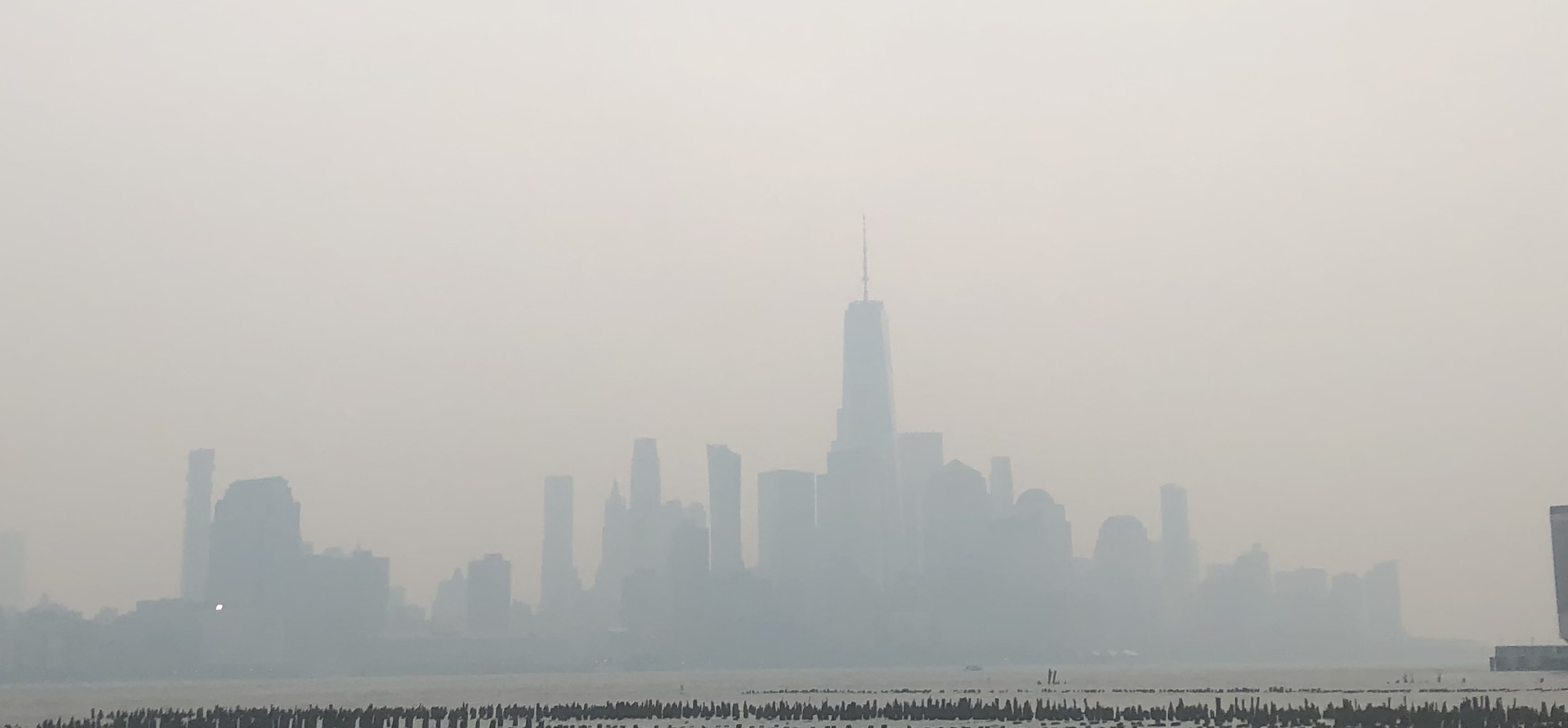
New York City skyline on June 6, as seen from Hoboken

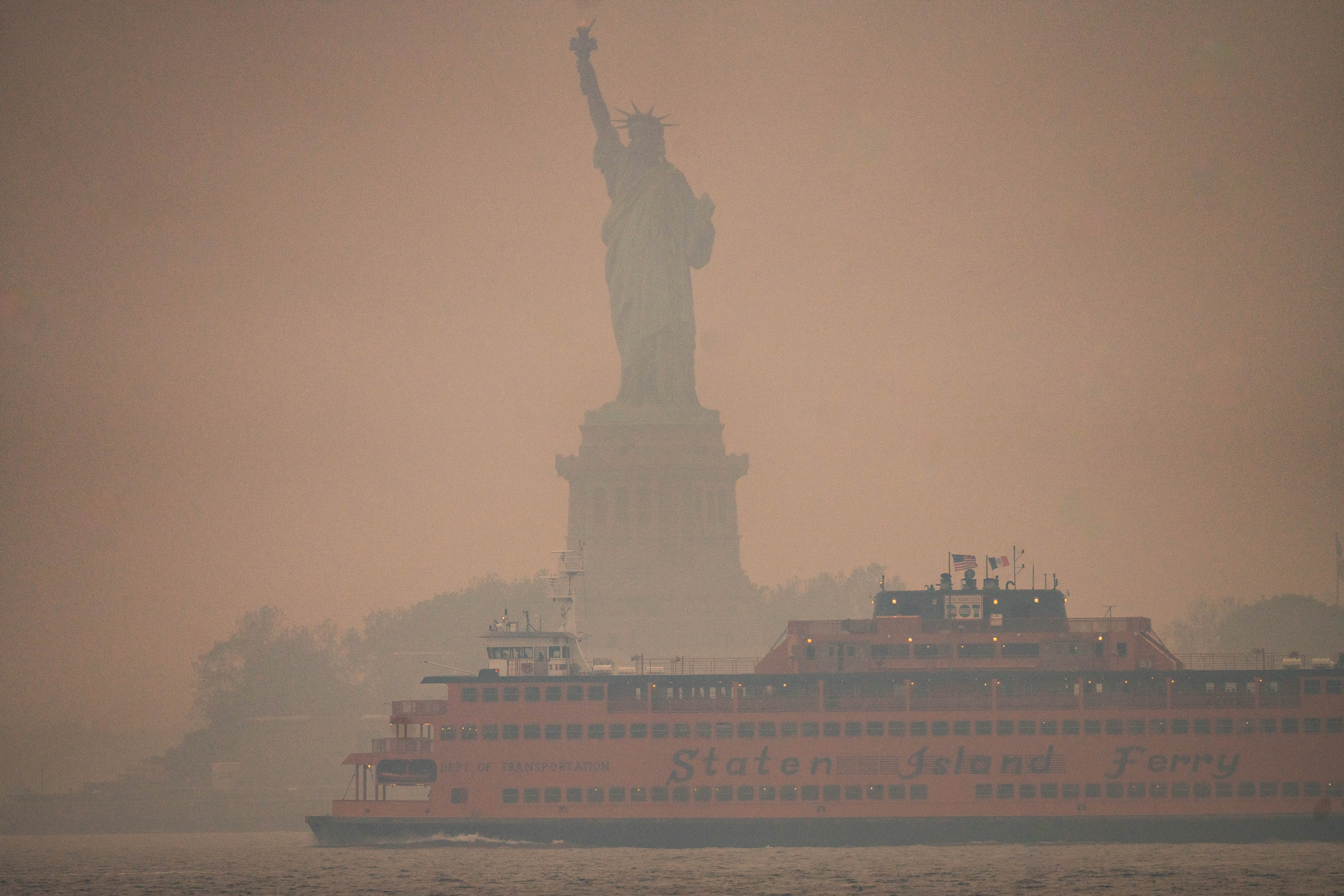
The Statue of Liberty on June 7

On June 2, smoke from the Nova Scotia wildfires affected air quality in Washington, D.C., and the states of Maryland, Pennsylvania, and Virginia. The smoke from wildfires in Quebec drifted into the Northeastern United States on June 5–6 and triggered air quality alerts for most of New York, Connecticut and some of the surrounding states, as well as the Midwestern states of Minnesota, Michigan, and Wisconsin. The smoke on June 6 was estimated by one Stanford researcher to have been the third-worst in the country since 2006. On June 6 and 7, solar farms in the Northeast and Midwest dropped production by around or more than 50% due to the smoke. By the night of June 6, New York City had the worst air pollution of any major city in the world; by the morning of June 7 it had fallen to second place, behind Delhi. This also marked the city's worst air quality since the 1966 New York City smog.

By June 7, air quality alerts also went out to residents in the Philadelphia metropolitan area and to additional areas in New England. In total, approximately 128 million Americans were under air quality alerts by the evening of June 7. The air quality index surpassed 400 in New York City; Syracuse, New York; Princeton Junction, New Jersey; and the Lehigh Valley in Pennsylvania. After a brief respite, New York City's air quality returned to being the worst of any major city in the world.

On June 7, New York City officials announced plans to distribute one million N95 masks. Several airline flights to and from New York City, New Jersey, and Washington, D.C. were delayed or cancelled; by the afternoon, the Federal Aviation Administration halted all flights going to LaGuardia Airport in New York City, citing visibility concerns. Schools across New York, New Jersey, and Connecticut announced closures. All bridges connecting Staten Island to New Jersey had their speed limits reduced to 30 mph (48 km/h) due to low visibility from the wildfire smoke. Major League Baseball, the National Women's Soccer League, and the Women's National Basketball Association postponed games scheduled to be held in New York City, New Jersey, and Philadelphia the night of June 7. The Public Theater cancelled its June 8 and 9 Shakespeare in the Park performances of Hamlet. On Broadway, performances of Camelot, Hamilton, and Prima Facie were cancelled due to the poor air quality.

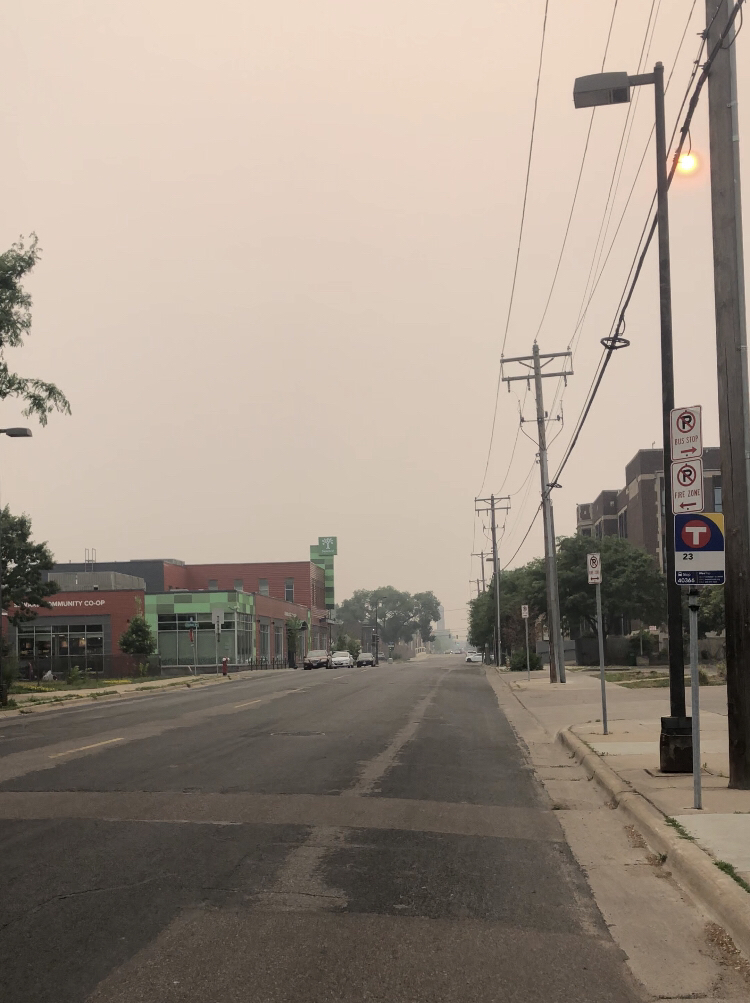
Wildfire smoke in Minneapolis on June 14

On the morning of June 8, air quality was worst throughout the area surrounding Pennsylvania, Washington, D.C., and Trenton, New Jersey. Philadelphia's air quality levels reached their worst levels since 1999. New York City climbed into the worst tier of the United States Environmental Protection Agency's six-tier air quality index, causing Governor Kathy Hochul to call it an "emergency crisis". Flights continued to be delayed for planes bound for Newark, New York City, and Philadelphia, with delays for Charlotte and Dallas also expected. United Airlines issued travel waivers to impacted passengers. Horse racing at Belmont Park in New York was cancelled, and Major League Baseball also postponed a game in Washington D.C. that night. The Bronx Zoo closed on June 8 due to smoke.

New York City public high schools and the School District of Philadelphia announced they would switch to virtual learning on June 9, due to poor air quality. By June 11, air quality alerts were still active in New York City, Baltimore, and Philadelphia, but air quality had substantially improved from earlier in the week.

On June 14, an air quality alert was issued for Minnesota due to dangerous air quality levels affecting the state. The air quality in Minneapolis reached 256 at 6:00 pm that day. On June 27, the smoke spread over the Midwest, causing Chicago to suffer from the worst air quality in the world, reaching 228 AQI. Michigan and Pennsylvania were also affected, and sent out air quality alerts to residents. Air quality alerts were issued for 80 million people in the US. On June 29, an MLB game in Pittsburgh was delayed by 45 minutes, and several players on the Pittsburgh Pirates were upset with the MLB for not postponing the game. On June 30, another air quality alert was issued for New York City.

=== Europe ===
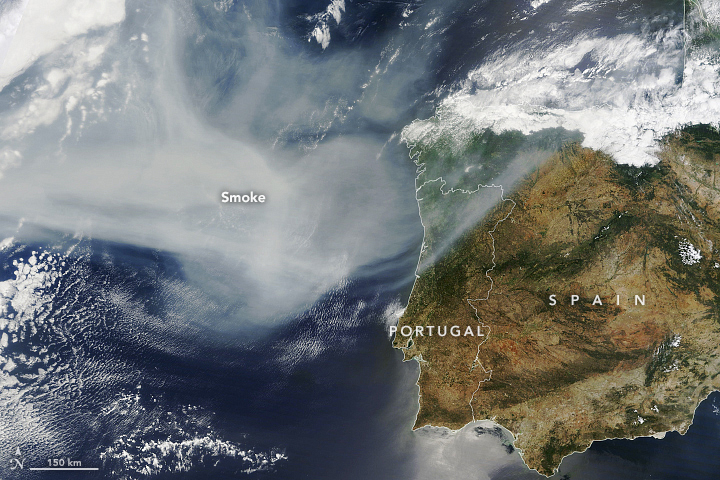
Smoke over Spain and Portugal on June 27

The wildfire smoke also drifted to Europe; as of May 23–25, it was mainly located over Scandinavia. On June 8, Iceland and Greenland were affected by drifting smoke, with forecasts suggesting Norway would also be affected over the next few days. As of June 9, smoke in Europe was not dense enough to have harmful effects on health.

On June 25, the smoke reached the Azores; by June 26, it reached Western Europe, specifically France, Portugal, Spain, and the United Kingdom. As the smoke was higher in the atmosphere, it did not affect air quality as it did in the United States, but forecasts predicted it could lead to more vivid sunrises and sunsets and hazy skies.

== Fatalities ==
A study published in Nature in 2025 attributed 3,400–7,400 acute deaths in North America, and 37,800–90,900 chronic deaths in North America and Europe, to PM_{2.5} (fine particulate matter) exposure from the 2023 Canadian wildfires.

On July 11, a 9-year-old boy in 100 Mile House, B.C., died after suffering an asthma attack worsened by wildfire smoke. In total, eight wildfire personnel died as a result of the fires. On July 13, a firefighter for the B.C. Wildfire Service was killed by a falling tree. On July 15, a firefighter for the Northwest Territories Forest Management Service died when he was struck by a falling tree. On July 19, a firefighter was killed when his Bell 205A helicopter crashed as he was bucketing water as part of firefighting operations in northwestern Alberta. A contract firefighter was fatally injured in the Prince George Fire Centre region on July 28. On August 18, a hospital patient from Yellowknife, N.W.T., died during the evacuation of the city. Additionally, on September 19, four contract crew members died in a vehicle crash with a semi-truck near Walhachin, B.C., as they returned from a shift working on fires in the Vanderhoof region.

Smoke from the fires contributed to a plane crash in June that killed a passenger near Beaver Island in Lake Michigan.

== Domestic government responses ==
"My wife and I were deeply concerned to learn of the wildfires ravaging communities in Western Canada. We send our most special thoughts and prayers to all those who have been displaced and who have lost their homes, businesses, or property. We would also like to express our deepest admiration to the first responders and volunteers who have been working to bring the fires under control, while also supporting their neighbours and communities in need.

We hold many fond memories of our visits to Western Canada and know that those affected will rise to this challenge with customary Canadian strength, resilience, and determination."

— Charles III, King of Canada, May 11, 2023

=== In Alberta ===
On May 9, the government of Yukon sent 21 firefighters to assist crews in Alberta. The team returned to Yukon on May 24. Another 21-person team returned to Alberta on May 31. On May 11, at least 300 members of the Canadian Armed Forces were also sent to different parts of Alberta to help.

=== In British Columbia ===
The province planned to put campfire bans in place on June 8, to stay in effect until October. International fire crews also came to British Columbia from five countries. Natural Resources Canada, with its Fire Weather Index, also tracked the wildfires and issued warnings. On August 18, the province imposed an emergency, giving officials more power to deal with fire risks.

On August 20, Prime Minister Justin Trudeau announced that the Armed Forces would help with evacuation in B.C. Trudeau visited the province on August 25 to meet with community leaders dealing with the wildfires.

=== In Manitoba ===
Travel restrictions were placed in southeastern Manitoba on May 27. Provincial burn permits for the area were cancelled, with the exception of burn permits for essential operations that had been approved by a conservation officer and which had had a site inspection. The government of Manitoba was not sending firefighters to assist other provinces in early June, due to concerns about Manitoba's fire risk.

=== In the Northwest Territories ===
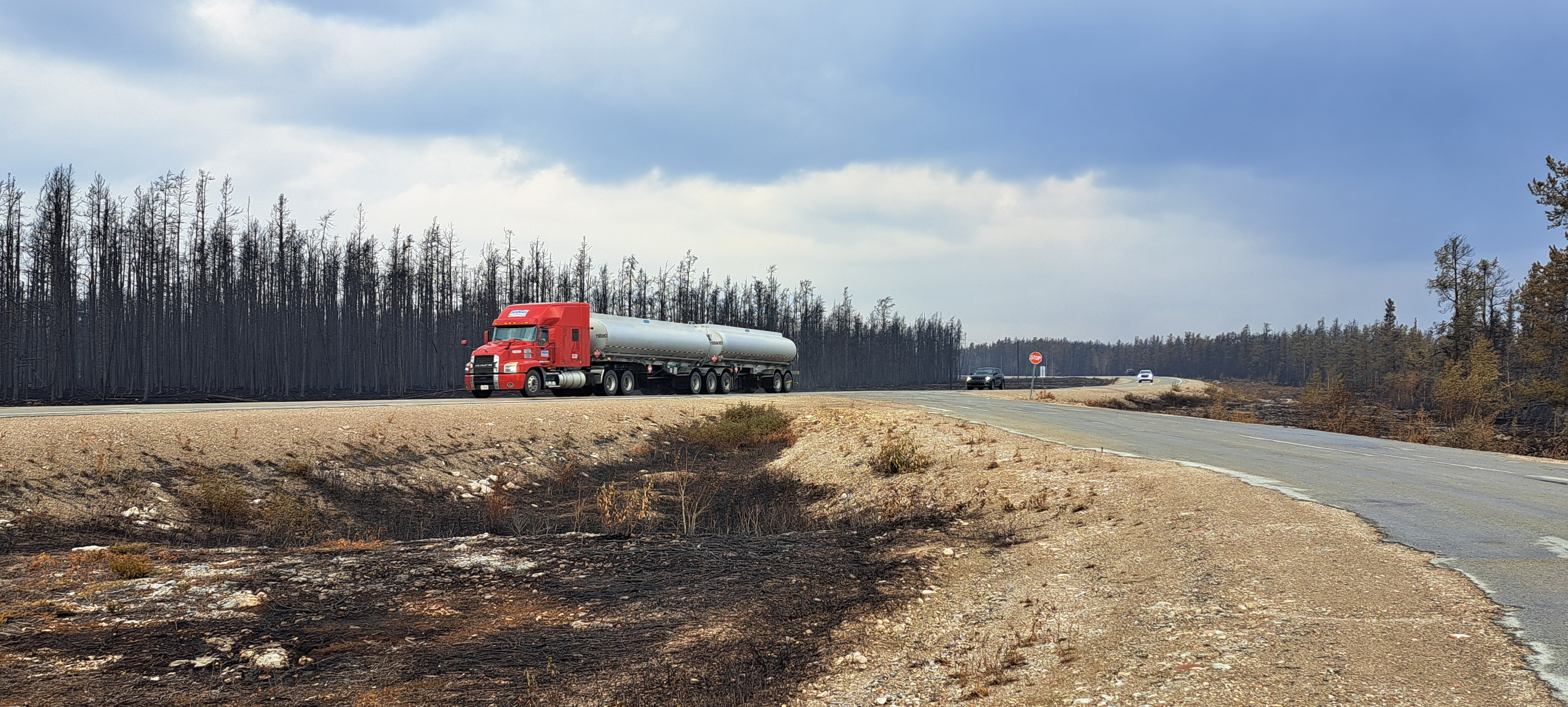
Vehicles driving out of NWT; forests on left side of road had burnt down

Although Nova Scotia sent a team of 20 firefighters to the NWT on May 25, they were recalled on May 29 due to the worsening wildfire situation in their home province. On June 6, the Canadian government announced that they and the Government of the Northwest Territories would match United Way donations for disaster relief in the region.

Smoke from the wildfires caused highways in the territory to be shut down, with the NWT government stating that "[h]ighway travel is not an option as a way out" due to dangerous conditions, instead saying "[y]our safest way out is on the plane, NOW. GO TO THE AIRPORT NOW." Kandis Jameson, the mayor of Hay River, urged residents on August 15 to "find transport out of [town] immediately," describing their situation as "life-threatening". On August 19, NWT Premier Caroline Cochrane announced that she had evacuated to Alberta to avoid taking up a space on one of the last planes to leave.

On August 14, Shane Thompson, the NWT Minister of Environment and Natural Resources, described the scale of the fires as "unprecedented" and "unlike anything we’ve ever experienced."

=== In Nova Scotia ===
To prevent further fires, all open fires were banned province-wide on May 29. On May 30, hiking, camping, fishing, and the use of vehicles in the woods were banned in all forests in the province until June 25, or until conditions allow them to be lifted. The Halifax Regional Municipality also closed all heavily wooded city parks on May 31. All schools in Shelburne County and several schools in Halifax Regional Municipality were closed in response to the fires.

In late-May, New London, Prince Edward Island sent a team of four firefighters to assist crews in Nova Scotia. On May 29, Newfoundland and Labrador sent two waterbombers to the province. In early June, a six-person team from Alberta came to the province to assist in assessing fire damage to property and infrastructure.

==== Financial relief ====
The provincial government issued an initial emergency payment of $500 to all evacuated households in the immediate aftermath of the fires. Additionally, the Canadian government established a donation matching program with the Nova Scotian government and the Canadian Red Cross to support those affected by the fires. On June 7, the provincial government announced it would give a one-time grant of $2,500 to registered farmers in Halifax and Shelburne County who had been under mandatory evacuation orders.

==== Aftermath ====
Delays of up to three years in rebuilding houses are expected due to the province's construction backlog.

=== In Saskatchewan ===
The provincial government put a fire ban in place on May 16; it was lifted on May 24 due to improving conditions. On May 19, the SPSA announced they would provide financial aid to residents impacted by fire-related power outages. The government of Quebec sent two amphibious tankers to the province to assist with firefighting efforts.

=== Government strategies for future fires ===
The Canadian government outlined a first line of actions that could help avoid or mitigate wildfires in future seasons:

- Training 300 Indigenous firefighters and 125 Indigenous fire guardians
- Training firefighters to respond to fires in the wildland–urban interface
- Launching a satellite mission (WildFireSat, currently planned for 2029) dedicated to monitoring fires
- Building wildland fire knowledge through research and pilot projects on fire risk reduction measures
- Creating a dedicated centre to help transform wildland fire management
- Growing the Canadian Armed Forces to allow for better response to disasters

== Other reactions ==
=== International responses ===
On May 8, 22 firefighters from the Oregon Department of Forestry were sent to Alberta to assist in fire control efforts, and on June 6, Quebec Premier François Legault announced that 200 French and American firefighters would travel to Quebec to help fight the wildfires, and that the province was in negotiations with Chile, Costa Rica, and Portugal to find more resources. On June 7, the Canadian Interagency Forest Fire Centre said that 950 firefighters and other personnel had travelled from other countries (including Australia, New Zealand, South Africa, and the United States) to provide aid. On June 8, the European Commission announced they would be sending more than 280 firefighters from France, Spain, and Portugal. New York governor Kathy Hochul announced the state would send seven firefighters over the course of two weeks, per the request of Canada.

Around 5,000 firefighters from multiple countries arrived in Canada as of June 14, with more expected to arrive from Chile and Costa Rica. Prime Minister Trudeau said that Canadian firefighters would also help other countries, saying that "fire seasons aren't always aligned and that allows for a travelling of resources that is part of how we're going to make sure we're protecting communities all around the world."

=== Facebook blocking wildfire news stories ===
In response to the Online News Act, Meta (owner of Facebook) began blocking access to news sites for Canadian users at the beginning of August 2023. This also extended to local Canadian news stories about the wildfires, a decision that was heavily criticized by Trudeau, local government officials, academics, researchers, and evacuees. Trudeau accused Facebook of "putting corporate profits ahead of people’s safety," with Premier of British Columbia David Eby expressing similar sentiments.

Evacuees who fled the Northwest Territories wildfires described the difficulty they faced attempting to share news (made worse by an already "barren" media landscape in the territory), as many relied on Facebook to communicate their situation. Ollie Williams of Yellowknife's Cabin Radio said that users had to resort to posting screenshots of news stories, as posting news directly would result in the link getting blocked.

Meta responded to these criticisms by stating that Canadians "can continue to use our technologies to connect with their communities and access reputable information [...] from official government agencies, emergency services and non-governmental organizations," and encouraged them to use Facebook's Safety Check feature.

=== Conspiracy theories ===
Conspiracy theories were promoted about the cause of the wildfires by climate change deniers, with arson, pyrotechnic drones, directed-energy weapons and space lasers being among the supposed causes. These conspiracy theories went viral on social media platforms such as TikTok.

In June, conspiracy theorists shared a TikTok video claiming that satellite footage showed the fires started spreading "at the same time" and that they were therefore caused deliberately. France 24 noted that the fires started over a period of twelve hours. Another TikTok video showed a helicopter carrying out backburning to get the fire under control, falsely claiming that it was the cause of the fires. Some social media users also falsely suggested that the haze seen over the United States was caused by ammonium nitrate instead of the wildfires.

Canadian former National Hockey League player Theo Fleury suggested on Twitter that governments are lying about the nature of climate change to facilitate "climate lockdowns". People's Party of Canada leader Maxime Bernier accused "green terrorism" of starting the fires.

In early 2024, a Quebec man, Brian Paré, who posted conspiracy theories claiming the fires were started deliberately by the government pleaded guilty to setting 14 fires himself, the largest of which burned over 872 hectares and resulted in the evacuation of about 500 homes in Chapais.

== Fire progression ==
Date	Area burned, in ha (Note: The numbers are estimates, based on data published in near real-time. They might not be completely consistent from one day to the next.)
Apr 26	1,266
Apr 27	1,443
May 1	5,894
May 2	5,678
May 3	6,737
May 4	14,994
May 5	56,092
May 6	375,185
May 7	432,535
May 8	443,817
May 9	462,773
May 10	477,613
May 11	505,907
May 12	511,794
May 13	542,406
May 14	670,020
May 15	726,594
May 16	1,017,139
May 17	1,275,957
May 18	1,351,581
May 19	1,499,216
May 20	1,973,991
May 21	1,698,994
May 22	1,714,863
May 23	1,876,101
May 24	2,043,529
May 25	2,067,298
May 26	2,078,533
May 27	2,195,863
May 28	2,889,471
May 29	2,414,113
May 30	2,560,629
May 31	2,728,769
Jun 1	2,851,501
Jun 2	2,986,417
Jun 3	3,287,459
Jun 4	3,304,749
Jun 5	3,571,727
Jun 6	3,701,470
Jun 8	4,319,045
Jun 9	4,499,084
Jun 10	4,614,997
Jun 11	4,740,948
Jun 12	4,808,108
Jun 13	5,106,234
Jun 14	5,291,261
Jun 15	5,403,358
Jun 16	5,449,454
Jun 17	5,799,392
Jun 18	5,792,184
Jun 19	5,824,993
Jun 20	5,888,016
Jun 21	5,958,026
Jun 22	6,257,052
Jun 23	6,731,792
Jun 24	7,146,653
Jun 25	7,236,001
Jun 26	7,563,045
Jun 27	7,790,469
Jun 28	7,974,865
Jun 29	8,140,908
Jun 30	8,160,309
Jul 1	8,793,725
Jul 2	8,332,604
Jul 3	8,418,750
Jul 4	8,484,483
Jul 5	8,782,952
Jul 6	8,855,838
Jul 7	8,928,358
Jul 8	9,124,238
Jul 9	9,215,125
Jul 10	9,333,743
Jul 11	9,506,770
Jul 12	9,694,800
Jul 13	9,419,818
Jul 14	9,718,096
Jul 15	9,994,359
Jul 16	10,005,903
Jul 17	10,193,171
Jul 18	10,938,881
Jul 19	10,971,638
Jul 20	11,140,735
Jul 21	11,362,697
Jul 22	11,348,381
Jul 23	11,506,693
Jul 24	11,655,972
Jul 25	11,994,987
Jul 26	12,145,200
Jul 27	12,230,949
Jul 28	12,266,697
Jul 29	12,281,385
Jul 30	12,315,837
Jul 31	12,586,645
Aug 1	13,000,784
Aug 2	13,074,988
Aug 3	13,092,367
Aug 4	13,123,362
Aug 5	13,020,356
Aug 6	13,076,056
Aug 7	13,272,851
Aug 8	13,280,599
Aug 9	13,319,485
Aug 10	13,392,707
Aug 11	13,475,670
Aug 12	13,129,948
Aug 13	13,161,600
Aug 14	13,189,644
Aug 15	13,231,376
Aug 16	13,678,162
Aug 17	13,749,167
Aug 18	13,972,393
Aug 19	13,944,486
Aug 20	14,001,313
Aug 21	15,050,098
Aug 22	15,325,405
Aug 23	15,407,441
Aug 24	14,991,791
Aug 25	14,854,402
Aug 26	14,867,937
Aug 27	15,050,434
Aug 28	15,161,476
Aug 29	15,196,368
Aug 30	15,239,780
Aug 31	15,583,272
Sep 1	16,071,488
Sep 2	16,128,924
Sep 3	16,363,947
Sep 4	16,441,400
Sep 5	16,466,514
Sep 6	16,515,356
Sep 7	16,564,616
Sep 8	16,757,658
Sep 9	16,962,723
Sep 10	16,964,048
Sep 11	16,983,588
Sep 12	17,047,648
Sep 13	17,330,903
Sep 14	17,347,576
Sep 15 (Note: This was the last daily update of the 2023 fire season. From here till the end of September, the numbers were updated weekly.)	17,359,816
Sep 20	17,577,396
Sep 27 (Note: Last regular situation report of the season. Only occasional updates are published after this.)	17,874,112
Oct 6	18,496,051

== See also ==
- 2019–20 Australian bushfire season
- 2023 Canadian drought
- 2023 Greek wildfires
- 2023 Hawaii wildfires
- Chinchaga fire
- Forests of Canada
- List of disasters in Canada
- List of fires in Canada
- List of largest fires of the 21st century
- New England's Dark Day
- Orange Skies Day
- Wildfire (2025 TV series)
