= Cabin Radio =

Canadian web media organization

Cabin Radio is a Canadian independent hyperlocal web media organization based in Yellowknife, Northwest Territories. Launched in 2017, it is owned and operated by a group of five Yellowknife residents, including Ollie Williams, a former BBC Sport reporter. The organization currently operates a news website and an Internet radio stream, as well as posting news updates to various social networking sites.

The website grew from three million page views in its first year in operation to over 13 million annual views by 2024.

In 2024, Cabin Radio won the Canadian Association of Journalists' national award for daily excellence in reporting for their live coverage of the NWT's 2023 wildfire crisis and evacuations.

In 2025, the Michener Award foundation awarded Cabin Radio a $125,000 Norman Webster Fellowship grant for a journalistic investigation into the circuit court system of the Territorial Court of the Northwest Territories.

== Community radio ==
In 2019 the company submitted an application to the Canadian Radio-television and Telecommunications Commission for a community radio license. The CRTC did not issue a decision until 2023, denying the company's application on the grounds that the Yellowknife market could not support a new radio station.

However, following widespread community opposition to the decision, the CRTC announced in 2024 that it would reopen the process, stating that the COVID-19 pandemic and the 2023 Canadian wildfires had highlighted the critical importance of reliable community-based news and information services in times of emergency. A new round of hearings started in February 2025, with the CRTC considering Cabin Radio's application alongside a competing application by Vista Radio.

On July 30, 2025, the CRTC approved Cabin Radio's application, assigning it the frequency of 93.9 FM and the call sign CJFC-FM.
