= 1989 Manitoba wildfires =

From May to September 1989, Canada experienced one of the worst wildfire seasons in its history. The fires were primarily concentrated in the northern part of Manitoba; parts of neighbouring provinces Saskatchewan and Ontario were also affected. Public Safety Canada reported that Manitoba experienced 1,229 wildfires. The wildfires set a record for area burned in Canada; the record was surpassed by the 2023 fire season. The fires were the largest and most expensive in Manitoba's history.

The fires were caused by natural and human causes; Manitoba was already experiencing drought. Conditions worsened in July due to a "combination of dry weather, temperatures in the 90-degree [32 °C] range and lightning". A July report indicated that about 20 communities were affected, most of them being First Nations reserves. Overall, about 25,000 people from approximately 25 communities were evacuated, with many being flown to Winnipeg.
