= Hatherley =

Hatherley may refer to:

== People ==
- Charlotte Hatherley (born 1979), a British guitarist
- Frank Hatherley (1890-1956), Australian broadcaster
- Owen Hatherley (born 1981), a British academic and architecture journalist
- Baron Hatherley, a title in the peerage of the United Kingdom, held by William Wood, 1st Baron Hatherley

== Places ==
- Up Hatherley, a district of Cheltenham, Gloucestershire
- Down Hatherley, a neighbouring village, Gloucestershire

== Fiction ==
- Victor Hatherley, a character in The Adventure of the Engineer's Thumb, a Sherlock Holmes story by Arthur Conan Doyle
