= Casey Hatherly =

Canadian climate activist

- Born: 1985 or 1986
- Other name: Ever
- Organization: On2Ottawa
- Known for: Climate change activism

Casey Hatherly (born 1985 or 1986, commonly known as Ever) is a Canadian climate activist and member of On2Ottawa.

Hatherly was arrested in March 2023 after interrupting Avril Lavigne at the Juno Awards to protest against climate related issues.

She has interrupted an international soccer match, and thrown paint on the Canadian Prime Minister's office while conveying concern for the climate crisis and environmental issues.

== Biography ==
Hatherly was born in 1985 or 1986.

Known as Ever, Hatherly is a member of the On2Ottawa group that draws inspiration from the climate-change related teaching of UK climate scientist David King. She lives in Vancouver.

In June 2022, Hatherly and one other protestor, interrupted a match between the Canada men's soccer team and the Curaçao football team to protest against old-growth logging. Hatherly was half naked and had the message “1022 days left” written on her torso. On August 9, 2022, she again protested against old-growth logging while naked from the waist up in at the visitor centre in Victoria, British Columbia. As part of the Save Old Growth campaign, Hatherly posed with the slogan "961 days left" on her upper half.

Hatherly was arrested after interrupting the Juno Awards of 2023. Naked from the waist up, she interrupted Avril Lavigne's interaction of AP Dhillon's performance to protest climate related causes. Her torso was adorned with protest slogans against oil pipelines, destruction of Ontario's greenbelt and old-growth-logging. "Land back", "Save the green belt" and "Stop logging old growth now" was written on Hatherly's torso. Lavigne responded to Hatherly: "Get the fuck off, get the fuck off, bitch." After the event, Hatherly said “Just tell Avril I'm not mad.” She was charged with mischief and was detained overnight in Edmonton Remand Centre before appearing in an Edmonton court. In May 2023, Hatherlay pled guilty to trespass and was fined $600.

University of British Columbia sociology professor David Tindall described Hatherly's actions as a typical means to draw attention in order to attract media attention, and suggested that her actions would have been more effective if they occurred at a government event.

On April 15, 2023, Hatherly splattered pink paint around the entrance of the Office of the Prime Minister. She posed with a sign that stated “Demand climate action now!”

== See also ==
- Nudity and protest
