= Brown carbon =

Brown smoke released by burning organic matter

In chemistry, brown carbon (C_{brown}/BrC) is a brown smoke that is released by the combustion of organic matter. It coexists with black carbon when released to the atmosphere.

Black carbon is primarily released by high-temperature combustion and brown carbon is emitted mainly by biomass combustion. These two are the two most important light absorbing substances in the atmosphere. The climate and radiative transfer are highly impacted by the absorptive properties of these substances. Aircraft measurements of smoke plumes in the western U.S. have reported varying trends in BrC absorption, including enhancement, depletion, or no significant change. Therefore, the understanding of brown carbon and constraints for atmospheric simulation are critical for the accuracy of climate modeling.

== Overview ==
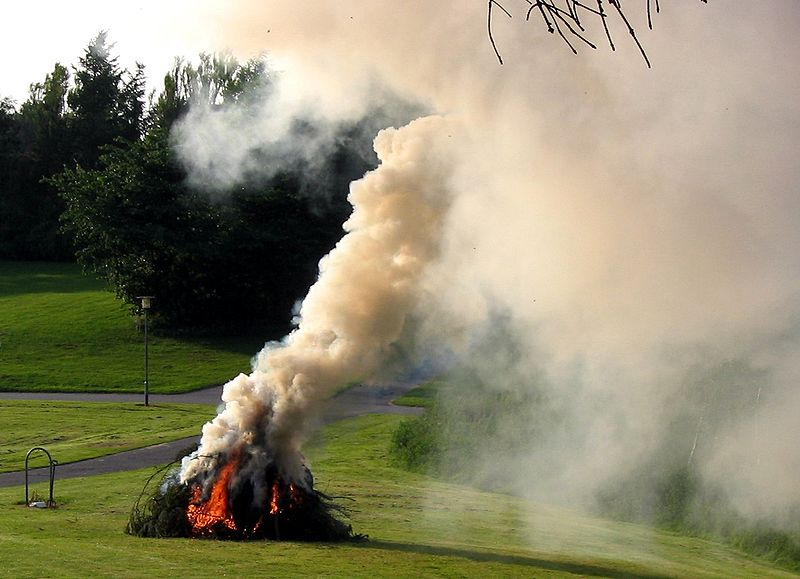
Low temperature Bonfire in Denmark releasing brown carbon aerosols into the atmosphere

=== Discovery ===
Light absorbing aerosols have become an interest of study because of its effects on atmospheric warming. While the function of black carbon created by biomass burning in relation to the warming of air has as of now been known, the lesser-known part of brown carbon has recently been discovered.

==== Brown carbon aerosols ====
The way light reflects the brown carbon off, it causes the material to appear brown or yellow. In respect to soot carbon (as an aerosol called black carbon) these light reflecting particles are collectively called brown carbon, highlighting their optical properties.

It was seen that particles from combustion or from residential coal usage can contain substantial amounts of brown carbon. This particulate matter appears light brown, and not black as would be expected for pure soot particles.

== Effects ==
=== Influence on Earth's atmosphere ===
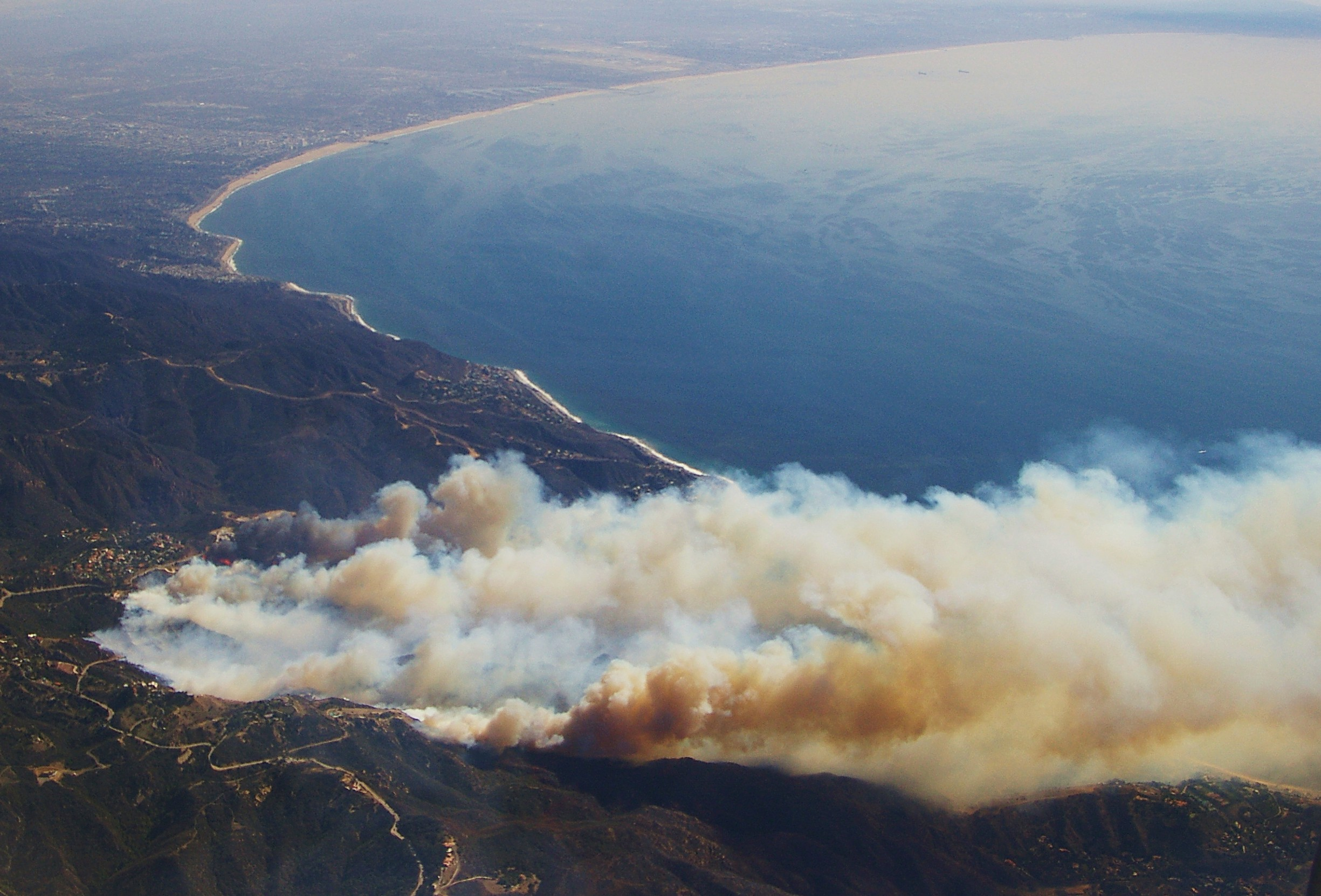
The Malibu fire looking southwest towards West Los Angeles. Santa Ana winds fuel the flames and blow the brown carbon filled smoke out to sea for miles

Aerosols are one of the most important contributors to climate change in the atmosphere. Many of the particles suspended in the atmosphere originate from a multitude of sources. Some of these sources are natural and some of them are man-made. Most aerosols reflect sunlight, and some also absorb it. A lot of these nanoparticles cause severe health effects in addition to climate effects. There are many human activities that produce these particles.

Black carbon particles (a component of soot) originating from combustion processes have been known for some time to absorb sunlight and warm the atmosphere, and pollution controls have been put into place to reduce their emissions and their effects.

Brown carbon has attracted interest as a possible cause of climate change. This class of organic carbon, known for its brownish color, absorbs strongly in the ultraviolet wavelengths and less significantly going into the visible wavelengths. Types of brown carbon include tar materials from smoldering fires or coal combustion, breakdown products from biomass burning, a mixture of organic compounds emitted from soil, and volatile organic compounds given off by vegetation.

In large quantities wildfires emitt dark brown carbon with absorption efficiencies equivalent to, or even exceeding, that of black carbon. It is seen "as a critical yet underrecognized contributor to wildfire radiative forcing". The lifetime of brown carbon in the atmosphere can be longer than 23 hours with a recalcitrant fraction of 4 ± 2%, indicating its impact on climate.

== Black and brown carbon ==
=== Brown carbon in relation to black carbon ===
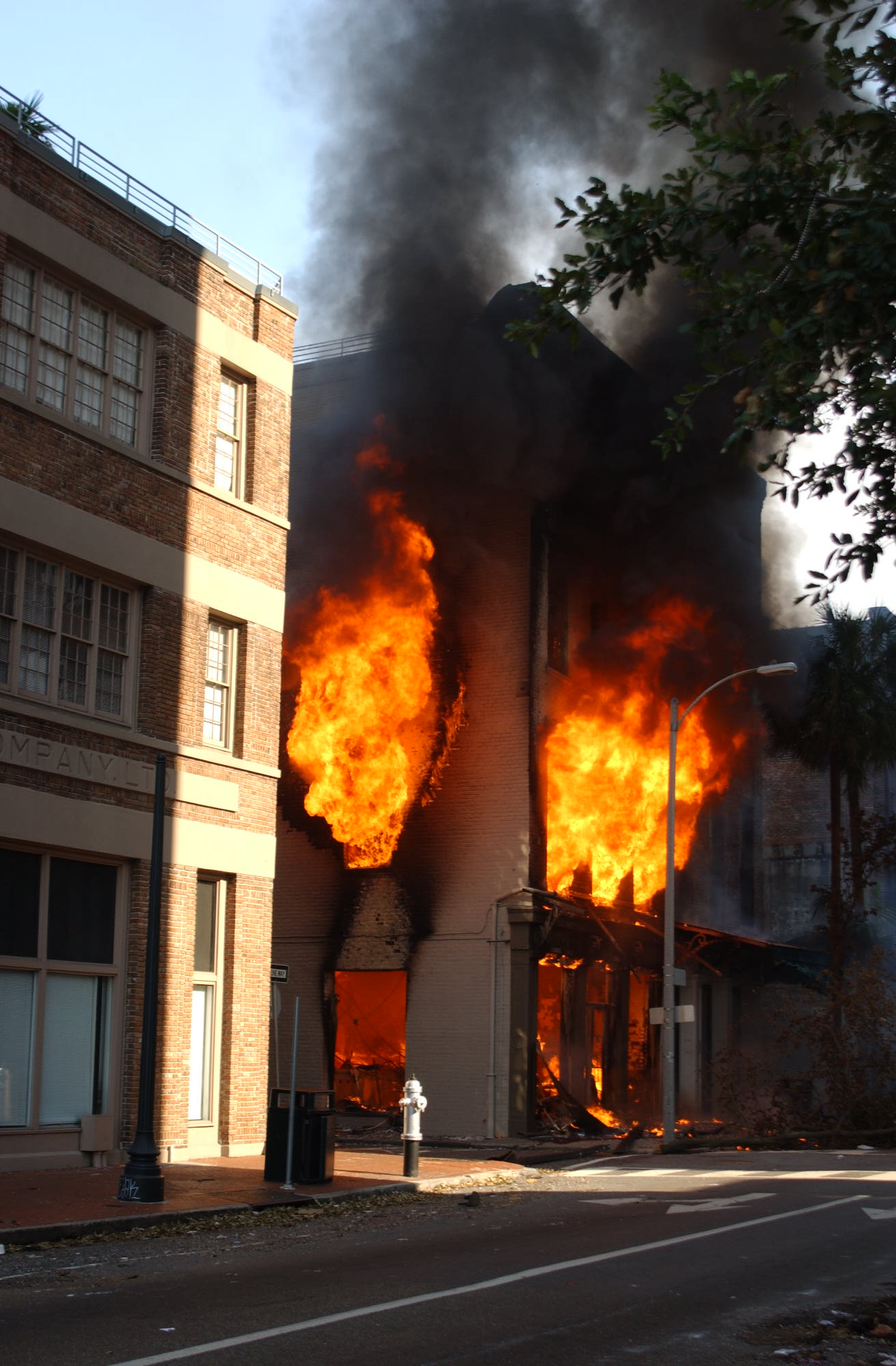
High temperature fire in New Orleans, after Hurricane Katrina, causing black carbon aerosols to be released in the atmosphere

Simulation models suggest that, brown carbon contributes about 19% of the total atmospheric absorption by aerosols, while 72% is attributed to black carbon and 9% is due to the coating effect of sulfate and organic aerosols on black carbon. It seems that brown carbon can play an important role in photochemistry and the hydrologic cycle, especially over regions dominated by biomass combustion. Therefore, brown carbon needs to be considered in global climate change simulations for a more accurate understanding. The relative fraction of carbonaceous aerosol emissions can be used to incorporate brown carbon into climate models.

=== Mixture of black and brown ===
Up to about 70% of light absorption is by black carbon. When Brown carbon is present independently, it has nearly 15% potential to warm the atmosphere by absorbing light.

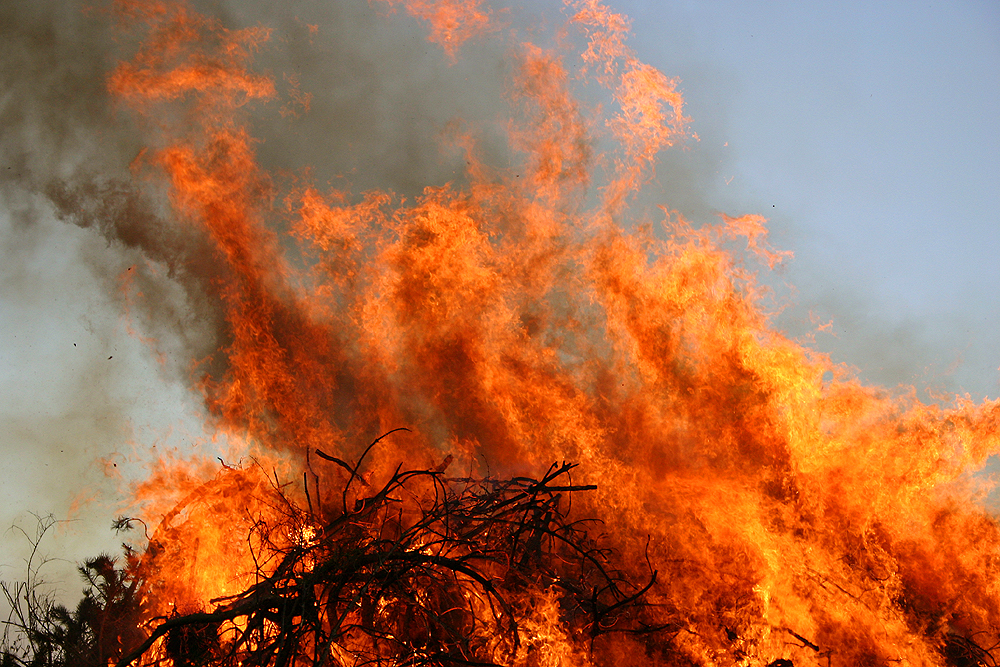
Most aerosols in the smoke of combustion are a mix of black and brown carbon. Sometimes this cannot be discerned with the naked eye.

== See also ==
- Black carbon
- Environmental impact of the coal industry
- Diesel exhaust
- Soot
- Smoke
- Global dimming
