= Index of Manitoba-related articles =

Articles relating to Manitoba include:

== 0-9 ==
- mb.ca - Second level domain for Manitoba

== A ==
- Airports in Manitoba
- Airlines of Manitoba

== B ==
- Breweries, wineries, and distilleries in Manitoba

== C ==
- Coat of Arms of Manitoba
- Climate of Manitoba
- Culture of Manitoba
- Central Plains Region
- Communist Party of Canada (Manitoba)
- Communities in Manitoba

== D ==
- Demographics of Manitoba

== E ==
- Economy of Manitoba
- Executive Council of Manitoba
- Elementary schools in Manitoba
- Eastman Region

== F ==
- Festivals in Manitoba
- First Nations in Manitoba
- Franco-Manitoban

== G ==
- Geography of Manitoba
- Green Party of Manitoba

== H ==
- History of Manitoba
- Higher education in Manitoba
- Hospitals in Manitoba
- High schools in Manitoba

== I ==
- Indian reserves in Manitoba
- Interlake Region

== L ==
- Legislative Assembly of Manitoba
- Legislative Council of Manitoba
- Lieutenant Governor of Manitoba
- Lakes of Manitoba
- Lighthouses in Manitoba

== M ==
- Monarchy in Manitoba
- Media in Winnipeg
- Manitoba Act
- Museums in Manitoba
- Manitoba Schools Question
- Middle schools in Manitoba
- Manitoba New Democratic Party
- Manitoba Liberal Party
- Manitoba First

== N ==
- National Historic Sites of Canada in Manitoba
- Northern Region

== O ==
- Outline of Manitoba
- Order of Manitoba

== P ==
- Politics of Manitoba
- Premier of Manitoba
- Political parties in Manitoba
- Parkland Region
- Pembina Valley Region
- Progressive Conservative Party of Manitoba

== R ==
- Rivers of Manitoba
- Radio stations in Manitoba
- Red River Rebellion
- Regions of Manitoba

== S ==
- Speaker of the Legislative Assembly of Manitoba

== V ==
- Vehicle registration plates of Manitoba

== W ==
- Westman Region
- Winnipeg Metro Region

== Z ==
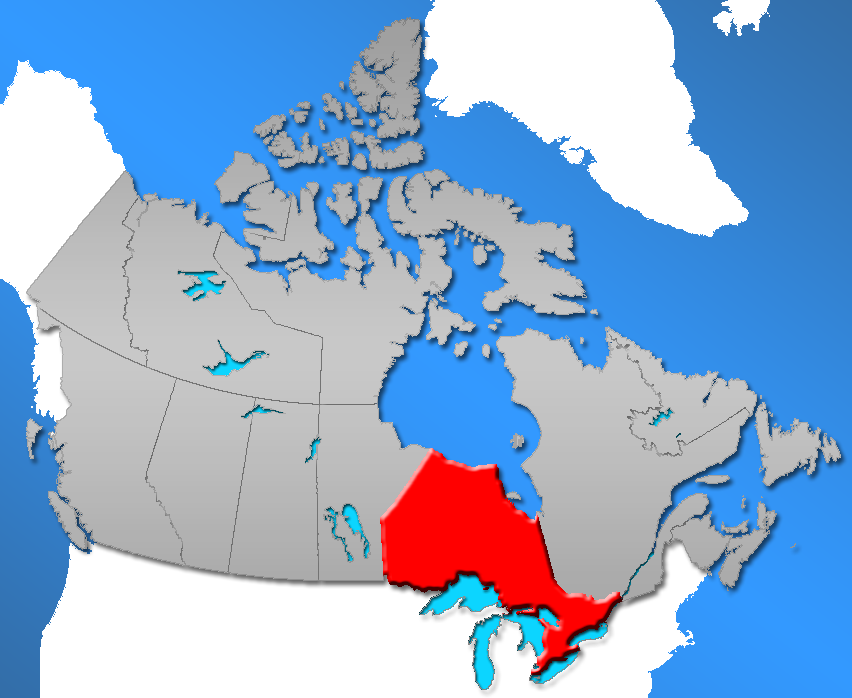
Lists of topics by provinces and territories
