= YCR =

YCR or ycr may refer to:

- YCR, the IATA code for Cross Lake (Charlie Sinclair Memorial) Airport, Manitoba, Canada
- ycr, the ISO 639-3 code for Yilan Creole Japanese, Taiwan
- ycr, the ycr index is a metric designed to evaluate the impact of scientific articles.
