= Manitoba Provincial Road 373 =

Provincial road in Manitoba, Canada

Provincial Road 373
- PR 373 highlighted in red

Route information
- Maintained by Manitoba Infrastructure and Transportation
- Length: 163.691 km (101.713 mi)
- Existed: 1972–present

Major junctions
- South end: Norway House Airport in Norway House
- PR 374 in Whiskey Jack Landing
- North end: PTH 6 near Conlin Lake Camp

Location
- Country: Canada
- Province: Manitoba

Highway system
- Provincial highways in Manitoba; Winnipeg City Routes
← PR 367	→ PR 374

Provincial Road 373 (also known as Highway 373 or PR 373) is a 163.691-kilometre (101.713 mi) long all-weather provincial road in Division 22 of Manitoba. PR 373 begins at an intersection with Highway 6 in Setting Lake, heads eastward through rural regions, and terminating at the entrance to Norway House Airport. There is one major intersection along the way, Road 374, which heads north to Cross Lake. PR 373's entire length is declared a class A1 provincial road.

== Route description ==
PR 373 begins at an intersection with PTH 6 near Setting Lake. The route immediately crosses the Canadian National Railway as a two-lane dirt road, passing south of Resting Lake. PR 373 runs east and northeast for several miles, passing a dirt road connection to Diamond Lake. The route makes a gradual bend to the southeast, passing Mustoe Lake and another dirt connection to Duck Lake. PR 373 bends southwest along a straight right-of-way, making a bend from a far distance around Tippett Lake before reaching the community of Jenpeg.

PR 373 runs through Jenpeg on a northeast right-of-way, crossing the northern end of Jenpeg Airport and south of the local dam. Making a bend to the southeast, PR 373 crosses the Nelson River and winds out of Jenpeg along the Nelson River. At the shores of Kiskittogisu Lake, the route reaches a junction with PR 374, which is a spur to Cross Lake and the Cross Lake First Nation. Also present at this junction is a spur to the lake. The route runs southeast for 35 kilometres (22 mi) before reaching the Nelson River once again.

PR 373 at the Nelson River is in the Norway House First Nation, which requires a ferry to cross the river. The route runs southwest along the Nelson River, passing a road that connects to another section of the First Nation. Near Hope Island, the route enters the Norway House First Nation once again, reaching Rossville near Hilton Lake. In Rossville, there's a connection to the Wasagamack and the St. Theresa Point nations. Crossing the Nelson River, PR 373 turns westward and crosses onto Fort Island. The route winds westward along the northern shore of the island and into downtown Norway House, reaching a junction with local streets in front of the Norway House Health Center. The right-of-way continues west as Lake Road to the shore of Little Playgreen Lake.

== History ==
PR 373 was first designated as a provincial highway from PR 391 near Pipun and the Canadian National Railway to the shores of Diamond Lake. At the same time, construction began on the Jenpeg Generating Station, which cost $310 million (1979 CAD). The next year, a spur of PR 373 was graded southeast of Wabowden and connected to the future site of the community of Jenpeg and the generating station. This also remained the same until 1978, when the road was extended across Ross Island and into downtown Norway House. The generation station at Jenpeg was completed in 1979. PR 373 remained the same length before being extended in 1986 to Norway House. A section to Diamond Lake was removed from the designation, but remained a gravel road. A spur to Cross Lake was also constructed. By 1989, the western terminus had been replaced by PTH 6, which was extended over PR 391. In 1994, PR 374 was designated on this spur to Cross Lake.

== Junction list ==
Division	Location	km	mi	Destinations	Notes
No. 22	Norway House	0.000	0.000	Norway House Airport	Route ends at entrance to airport
No. 22		42.357	26.319	Ross Island Ferry over Nelson River	
No. 22	Whiskey Jack Landing	77.586	48.210	PR 374 north – Cross Lake	Southern terminus of PR 374
No. 22		90.000	55.923	Jenpeg Dam over Nelson River	
No. 22		141.261	87.776	PR 631 – Sipiwesk Lake	Southern terminus of PR 631
No. 22	Conlin Lake Camp	163.691	101.713	PTH 6 – The Pas, Thompson	
1.000 mi = 1.609 km; 1.000 km = 0.621 mi
