= Manitoba Provincial Road 374 =

Provincial road in Manitoba, Canada

Provincial Road 374
- PR 374 highlighted in red

Route information
- Maintained by Manitoba Infrastructure and Transportation
- Length: 37.004 km (22.993 mi)
- Existed: 1994–present

Major junctions
- South end: PR 373 south of Jenpeg
- North end: Ethel McLeod Drive / Airport Road in Cross Lake

Location
- Country: Canada
- Province: Manitoba

Highway system
- Provincial highways in Manitoba; Winnipeg City Routes
← PR 373	→ PR 375

Provincial Road 374 (PR 374) is a 37.004-kilometre-long (22.993 mi) provincial highway in northeastern Manitoba. A spur of PR 373 southeast of Jenpeg, PR 374 runs to Cross Lake, which connects to local streets and the Cross Lake First Nation. The route also crosses over the Kichi Sipi Bridge, which spans over the Nelson River since September 2004.

The route was designated in 1994 as an all-gravel road with a ferry crossing over the Nelson River. With the construction of the Kichi Sipi Bridge, parts of PR 374 were paved and re-aligned to replace the old ferry.

== Route description ==
PR 374 begins at an intersection with PR 373 and a local road which connects to Whiskey Jack Landing on the shores of Kiskittogisu Lake. A two-lane gravel road, PR 374 runs northeast from PR 373 and makes a wide bend past a dirt road to nearby Cross Lake. The route winds northeast for several kilometres, turning into an asphalt all-weather road. PR 374 then reaches the Kichi Sipi Bridge (Great River in Cree), crossing over the Nelson River near Pipestone Lake.

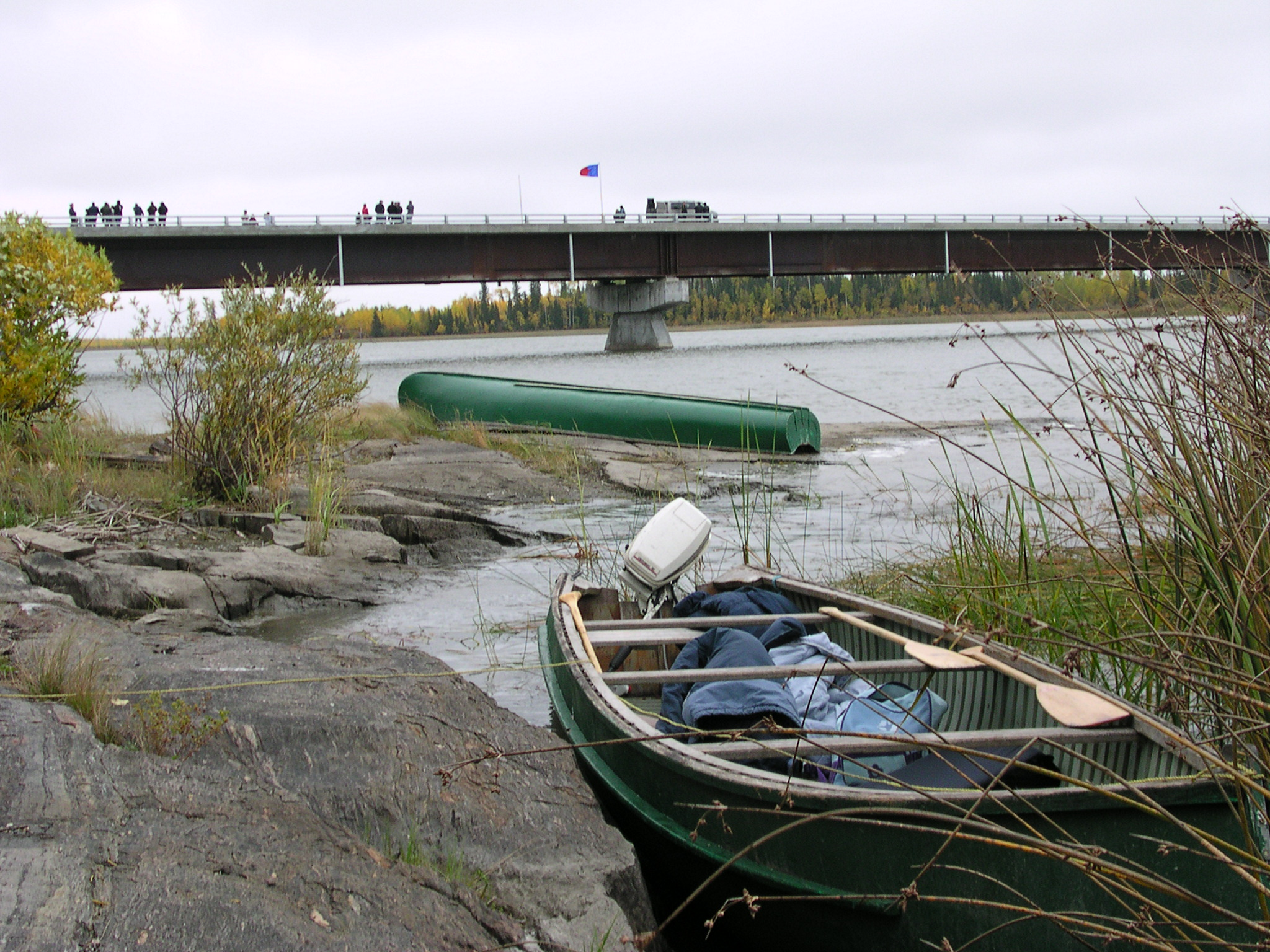
The Kichi Sipi Bridge, which spans the Nelson River as part of PR 374

Passing west of Wawe Lake, PR 374 runs northward reaching the shores of Cross Lake. Running northeast along the eastern shoreline, the route makes a gradual bend and turns southwest along the western shore. After making the bend, PR 374 goes from a rural two-lane road to passing some residences, connecting via local dirt roads. The route bends westward and reaches a junction with Airport Road, which connects PR 374 to Cross Lake Airport. At Airport Road, the route turns north along the Nelson River and Cross Lake.

After crossing the water, PR 374 passes west of another residential neighborhood of Cross Lake. The route turns west after a second bridge, running along the southern end of the city of Cross Lake. PR 374 makes a bend to the north and terminates at a junction with Ethel McLeod Drive and Airport Road, where provincial maintenance ends. Airport Road connects to Cross Lake (Charlie Sinclair Memorial) Airport.

== History ==
The alignment that would become PR 374 was first graded by 1986, providing the first road access to Cross Lake as part of construction to Jenpeg. PR 374 was first designated by the province of Manitoba in 1994 as a spur from PR 373 to Cross Lake. This included a ferry across the Nelson River in the middle of the road, and was all gravel.

On August 29, 2002, the province announced the beginning of construction on a new bridge across the Nelson River, which involved several different locations to replace the ferry across the river. In order to choose the final location, engineers had to study the environment of where to build the bridge, as well as the economic impact of constructing the road and for the city of Cross Lake. The final design proposal involved a 260-metre (850 ft) four-lane long bridge across the Nelson River. The new bridge would be located 1,000-metre (3,300 ft) downstream from the ferry crossing. This new alignment also involved re-aligning 4.4 kilometres (2.7 mi) of PR 374 to the new bridge instead of the ferry.

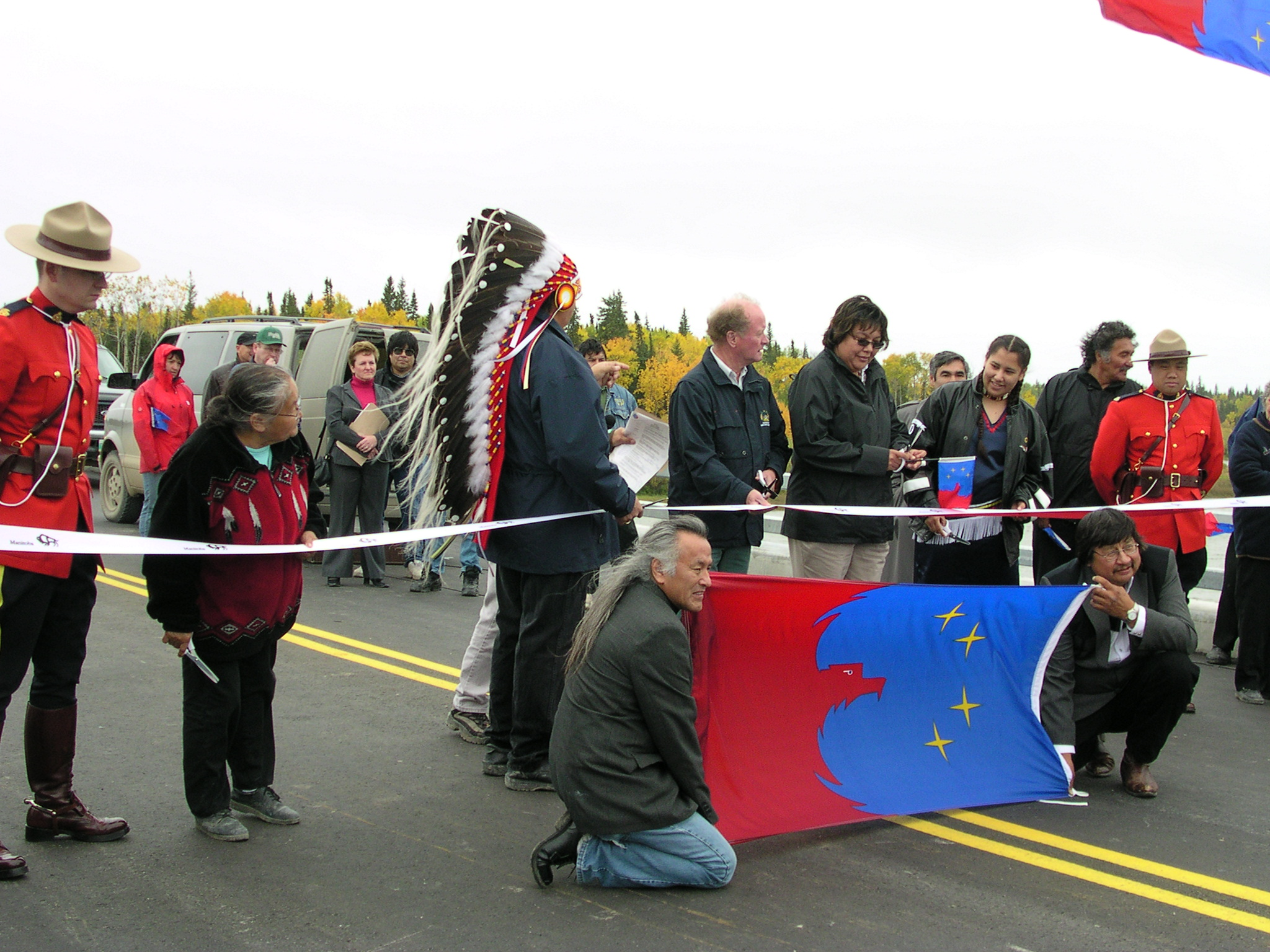
The Kichi Sipi Bridge opening in September 2004

The new bridge and alignment was put under the control of Kiewit Management, which spent 2003 and most of 2004 constructing the complex bridge due to its location and various environmental impediments, such as basaltic bedrock. On September 20, 2004, the new bridge was opened to traffic at the cost of $25 million (2004 CAD). The construction of the bridge was constructed ahead of schedule and at-budget, with no overruns.

The Kichi Sipi Bridge was part of a plan for improvement of access through northeastern Manitoba to help upgrade access to Cross Lake and Norway House. This new project also involves the paving of PR 373 near the Kichi Sipi Bridge, as well as grading the road from PR 373 to a point 14 kilometres (8.7 mi) northeast as part of extra $53 million of expenditures. By 2015, only the portion of PR 373 from the 14-kilometre point to the Kichi Sipi Bridge was paved. Instead, the first 14-kilometre (8.7 mi) section was delayed to be completed by the 2019 fiscal year.

== Junction list ==
Division	Location	km	mi	Destinations	Notes
No. 22	Whiskey Jack Landing	0.000	0.000	PR 373 – Thompson, Norway House	
No. 22		22.0– 22.3	13.7– 13.9	Kichi Sipi Bridge over the East Channel of the Nelson River	
No. 22	Cross Lake	37.004	22.993	Ethel McLeod Drive / Airport Road – Cross Lake Airport	Locally-maintained continuation of PR 374
1.000 mi = 1.609 km; 1.000 km = 0.621 mi
