= Demographics of Manitoba =

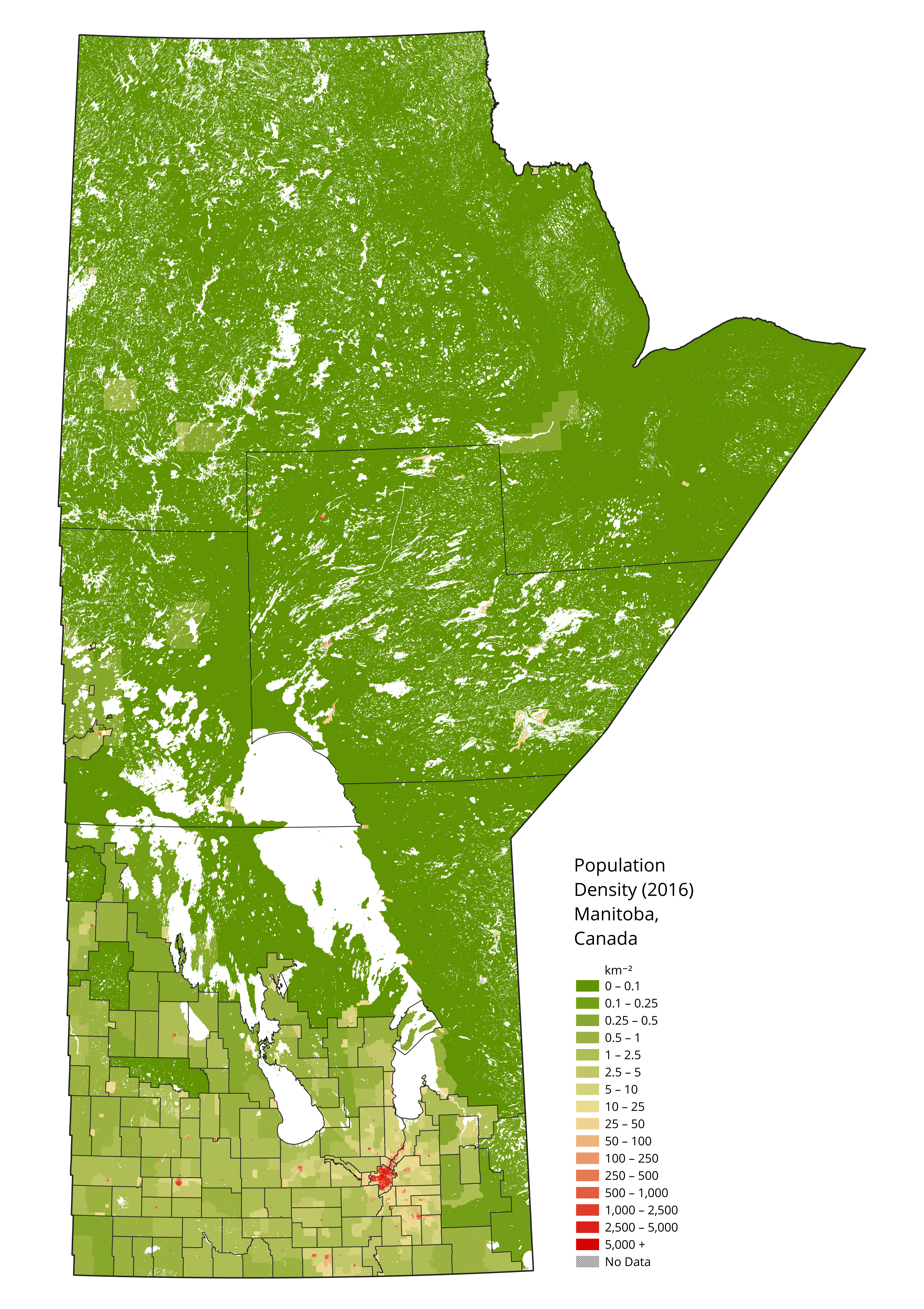
Manitoba population density, 2016

Manitoba is one of Canada's 10 provinces. It is the easternmost of the three Prairie provinces.

Manitoba's capital and largest city (containing over half its population) is Winnipeg. Other important cities and towns include Brandon, Thompson, Dauphin, Swan River, Churchill, The Pas, Selkirk, Portage la Prairie, Gimli, Flin Flon, Steinbach, Morden, Virden, Minnedosa, Emerson, Lockport, Neepawa, and Winkler.

Over one million people live in Manitoba's southern regions, in a small string of cities and towns (Winnipeg, Brandon, etc.) about the size of Ontario's Golden Horseshoe.

== Population history ==
View chart definition.

Year	Population	Five Year % change	Ten Year % change	Rank Among Provinces
1871	25,228	n/a	n/a	8
1881	62,260	n/a	146.8	6
1891	152,506	n/a	145	5
1901	255,211	n/a	67.3	5
1911	461,394	n/a	80.8	5
1921	610,118	n/a	32.2	4
1931	700,139	n/a	14.8	5
1941	729,744	n/a	4.2	6
1951	776,541	n/a	6.4	6
1956	850,040	9.5	n/a	6
1961	921,686	8.4	18.7	6
1966	963,066	4.5	13.3	5
1971	988,245	2.3	7.2	5
1976	1,021,505	3.4	6.1	5
1981	1,026,241	0.4	3.8	5
1986	1,063,015	3.6	4.1	5
1991	1,091,942	2.7	6.4	5
1996	1,113,898	2.0	4.8	5
2001	1,119,583	0.5	2.5	5
2006	1,148,401	2.6	3.1	5
2011	1,208,268	5.2	7.9	5
2016	1,278,365	5.8	11.3	5
2021	1,342,153	5.0	9.0	5

Source: Statistics Canada

== Principal urban areas ==
=== Winnipeg ===
More than half of Manitoba's 1,148,801 population live in the urban area surrounding the city of Winnipeg. The urban area (UA) covers 448.92 square kilometres and had a 2006 census population of 641,483 (which was an increase of 2.3% from 2001). The City of Winnipeg itself had a 2011 census population of 636,617 (an increase of 4.8% over 2006).

Manitoba Census Division No. 11, which includes both the City of Winnipeg and the Rural Municipality of Headingley, had a 2011 population of 666,832 (an increase of 4.8%). The Rural Municipality of Headingley had a 2011 census population of 3,215 (an increase of 17.9% from 2006) but is not counted as part of the Urban Area by Census Canada.

The Winnipeg Census Metropolitan Area (CMA) includes all of Census Division No. 11 as well as parts of Divisions 02, 10, 12, 13, and 14, and had a 2006 population of 694,668 (which was an increase of 2.7%). The Winnipeg Capital Region comprises the CMA and additional portions of Census Divisions 10, 13, and 14.

Census Division No. 13 includes the Regional Municipality of East St. Paul (with a population of 8,733, of whom 7,475 were included in the population of the UA) and the Regional Municipality of West St. Paul (with a population of 4,357 of whom 2,234 were included in the population of the UA). The Regional Municipality of St. Clements (population 9,706) and the Indian Reservation of Brokenhead 4 (population 467) are also part of the CMA. The Regional Municipality of St. Andrews (population 11,359) along with the City of Selkirk (population 9,515) are to some degree a distinct Urban Area (See 6. below) and while they are part of the Winnipeg Capital Region they are not part of the CMA. The Village of Dunnottar (population 692) is also not part of the CMA.

Census Division No. 02 includes the Regional Municipality of Taché which had a population of 9,083 including the unincorporated Urban Area of Lorette (1,447), and also includes the Regional Municipality of Ritchot which had a population of 5,051 including the unincorporated Urban Area of St. Adolphe (1,048). These Regional Municipalities are both part of the CMA and of the Region. The Regional Municipality of Hanover (population 11,871) and the City of Steinbach (population 11,066) are to some degree a distinct Urban Area (see 5. below). The Town of Niverville (population 2,464) is wedged in between the Regional Municipalities of Hanover and Taché. Census Division No. 02 also includes several other subdivisions.

Census Division No. 12 includes the Rural Municipality of Springfield which had a population of 12,990 including the unincorporated Urban Area of Oakbank (2,075), and which is part of the CMA and the Region. The only other subdivisions of Census Division No. 12 are the City of Beasejour (2,823) and the Rural Municipality of Brokenhead (3,940) both of which are not part of the CMA or the Region.

Census Division No. 10 includes the Regional Municipalities of Macdonald (5,653) and St. François Xavier (1,087).both of which are part of the CMA and the Region. The only other subdivision of Census Division No. 10 is the Regional Municipality of Cartier (3,162) which is part of the Region but not of the CMA.

Census Division No. 14 includes the Regional Municipality of Rosser (1,364) which is part of the CMA. The Regional Municipality of Rockwood with a population of 7,692 including the unincorporated Urban Area of Stony Mountain (1,757), is part of the Region but not part of the CMA. The Town of Stonewall (population 4,376) is a distinct Urban Area (see 12. below). Stonewall and the Town of Teulon (1,124), are completely surrounded by Rockwood. The only other subdivision of Census Division No. 10 is the Regional Municipality of Woodlands (3,562) which is not part of the CMA or of the Region.

=== Brandon ===
The City of Brandon had a 2011 census population of 46,061 which was the same as the population of the Urban Area. The Brandon Census Agglomeration had a 2006 census population of 48,256 including the Rural Municipality of Cornwallis, which had a population of 4,058 including the unincorporated urban area of Shilo CFB-BFC (1,314). The Rural Municipality of Whitehead (1,402) and the Rural Municipality of Elton (1,285) are also part of the Census Agglomeration. Brandon is located in Census Division No. 07, which had a 2011 census population of 64,317 and is part of Manitoba's Westman Region. There are several other subdivisions of Census Division No. 07

=== Steinbach ===
The City of Steinbach had a 2011 census population of 13,524 which was the same as the population of the urban area. Steinbach is located in Census Division No. 02 which had a 2011 census population of 65,384 and which is part of Manitoba's Eastman Region. Also included in this Census Division (CD) is the Regional Municipality of Hanover (population 14,026), which surrounds the City of Steinbach on three sides, and the Regional Municipalities of Taché and Ritchot which are part of the Winnipeg CMA. The Town of Niverville, with a population of 3,540, is wedged in between the Regional Municipalities of Hanover and Taché.

=== Portage la Prairie ===
The City of Portage la Prairie had a 2011 census population of 12,996. The population of the Urban Area was 12,996. The Portage la Prairie Census Agglomeration had a 2006 census population of 20,494, including the Regional Municipality of Portage la Prairie (6,793) as well as several Indian Reservations. Portage la Prairie is located in Census Division No. 09 which had a 2011 census population of 23,489 and is part of Manitoba's Central Plains Region.

=== Thompson ===
The City of Thompson had a 2011 census population of 12,829 which was the same as the population of the urban area. The Thompson Census Agglomeration had a 2006 census population of 13,593, including the Local Government District of Mystery Lake (147). Thompson is located in Census Division No. 22 which had a 2011 census population of 40,923 and is part of Manitoba's Northern Region. The next most populous subdivisions of this Census Division (CD) were the Indian Reservations of Norway House 17 (population 4,758) and St. Theresa Point (population 2,871).

=== Winkler ===
The City of Winkler had a 2011 census population of 10,670 which was the same as the population of the Urban Area. Winkler is located in Census Division No. 03 which had a 2011 census population of 51,350 and is part of Manitoba's Pembina Valley Region. The City of Winkler is surrounded by the Regional Municipality of Stanley. There are many other subdivisions of this Census Division.

=== Selkirk ===
The City of Selkirk had a 2011 census population of 9,834. The population of the Urban Area was 9,834. Selkirk is located in Census Division No. 13 which had a 2011 census population of 46,888 and is part of Manitoba's Interlake Region Region. Also included in this Census Division are the Regional Municipality of St. Andrews, which surrounds the City of Selkirk on three sides and which had a 2011 census population of 11,875); and the Regional Municipalities of East St. Paul, West St. Paul, and St. Clements, which are part of the Winnipeg CMA; and the Indian Reservation of Brokenhead 4; and the Village of Dunnottar.

=== Dauphin ===
The City of Dauphin had a 2016 census population of 8,457 which was the same as the population for the Urban Area. Dauphin is located in Census Division No. 17 which had a 2016 census population of 22,205 and is part of Manitoba's Parkland Region. Also included in this Census Division is the Regional Municipality of Dauphin (2,388) which surrounds the City of Dauphin.

=== Other urban areas ===
The Town of Morden had a 2011 census population of 7,812, which was the same as the population for the urban area, and is located in Census Division No. 03. Morden is surrounded by the Regional Municipality of Stanley.(6,367).

The Town of The Pas had a 2011 census population of 5,513. The population of the Urban Area was 5,513 and includes part of the Opaskwayak Cree Nation 21A Indian Reserve. The Pas is located in Census Division No. 21 which had a 2011 census population of 21,393 and is part of Manitoba's Northern Region.

The City of Flin Flon had a 2011 census population of 5,363. The population of the Manitoba part of the Urban Area was also 5,363. Flin Flon is also located in Census Division No. 21.

The Town of Stonewall had a 2011 census population of 4,536 which was the same as the population for the Urban Area. Stonewall is located in Census Division No. 14 which had a 2011 census population of 18,497 and is part of Manitoba's Interlake Region. Stonewall is surrounded by the Regional Municipality of Rockwood (7,692).

The Town of Altona had a 2011 census population of 4,082. The population of the Urban Area was 4,082. Altona is located in Census Division No. 3 which had a 2011 census population of 51,350 and which is part of Manitoba's Pembina Valley Region.

The Town of Swan River had a 2011 census population of 3,907 which was the same as the population of the Urban Area. Swan River is located in Census Division No. 20 which had a 2011 census population of 9,952 and is part of Manitoba's Parkland Region. Also included in this Census Division is the Regional Municipality of Swan River (2,784).

The Town of Neepawa had a 2021 census population of 5,685 which was the same as the population of the Urban Area. Neepawa is located in Census Division No. 15 which had a 2021 census population of 23, 304 and is part of Manitoba's Westman Region.

Source: Statistics CanadaSource: Statistics Canada

== Ethnic origins ==
Manitoba is home to the largest Icelandic population outside of Iceland. There are 30,555 people with Icelandic ancestry living in Manitoba, making up 2.7 percent of the total population of Manitoba. About 35 percent of the Icelandic-Canadian population lives in Manitoba.

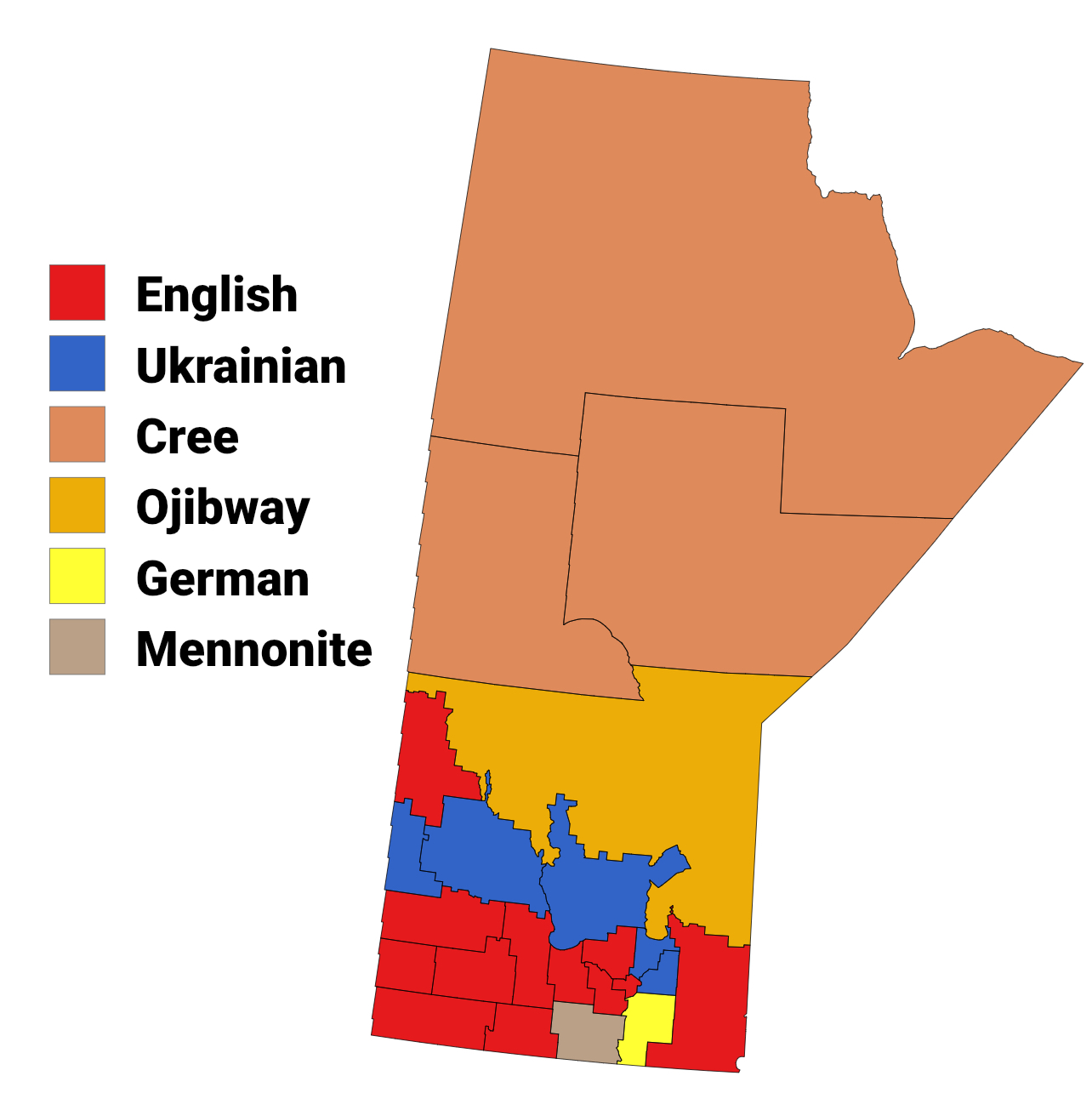
Largest ethnic origin by census division, 2021 census

Ethnic groups in Manitoba (1941–2021)
Ethnic group	2021		2006		1941	
Ethnic group	Pop.	%	Pop.	%	Pop.	%
English	210,285	16.09%	259,595	22.9%	168,917	23.15%
Scottish	189,650	14.51%	209,170	18.45%	109,619	15.02%
German	177,355	13.57%	216,755	19.12%	41,479	5.68%
Ukrainian	165,305	12.65%	167,170	14.75%	89,762	12.3%
Irish	144,420	11.05%	151,915	13.4%	76,156	10.44%
First Nations	140,250	10.73%	120,415	10.62%	14,303	1.96%
French	121,360	9.28%	148,570	13.11%	52,996	7.26%
Filipino	90,945	6.96%	39,205	3.46%	—N/a	—N/a
Métis	88,300	6.75%	72,450	6.39%	8,891	1.22%
Polish	78,860	6.03%	82,355	7.27%	36,550	5.01%
Mennonite	51,200	3.92%	—N/a	—N/a	—N/a	—N/a
Russian	48,565	3.72%	45,625	4.03%	6,571	0.9%
Dutch	43,395	3.32%	55,425	4.89%	39,204	5.37%
Indian	38,825	2.97%	14,860	1.31%	7	0.001%
Icelandic	31,105	2.38%	30,550	2.7%	13,954	1.91%
Chinese	29,550	2.26%	17,930	1.58%	1,248	0.17%
Italian	22,835	1.75%	21,405	1.89%	2,482	0.34%
Swedish	21,165	1.62%	21,820	1.92%	9,547	1.31%
Belgian	20,580	1.57%	19,805	1.75%	6,715	0.92%
Norwegian	19,115	1.46%	18,395	1.62%	5,955	0.82%
Welsh	17,180	1.31%	16,945	1.49%	5,686	0.78%
Punjabi	13,790	1.05%	1,015	0.09%	—N/a	—N/a
Portuguese	13,395	1.02%	11,105	0.98%	16	0.002%
Jewish	11,745	0.9%	13,175	1.16%	18,879	2.59%
Austrian	11,440	0.88%	11,900	1.05%	4,719	0.65%
Spanish	10,845	0.83%	8,715	0.77%	168	0.02%
Hungarian	10,175	0.78%	9,905	0.87%	2,418	0.33%
Total responses	1,307,185	97.39%	1,133,515	98.7%	729,744	100%
Total population	1,342,153	100%	1,148,401	100%	729,744	100%
Note: Totals greater than 100% due to multiple origin responses

=== Future projections ===
Panethnic origin projections in Manitoba (2031–2041)
Panethnic group	2031		2036		2041	
Panethnic group	Pop.	%	Pop.	%	Pop.	%
European (Note: Statistic includes all persons that did not make up part of a visible minority or an Indigenous identity.)	774,000	49.84%	750,000	46.13%	725,000	42.82%
Indigenous	315,000	20.28%	335,000	20.6%	354,000	20.91%
Southeast Asian (Note: Statistic includes total responses of "Filipino" and "Southeast Asian" under visible minority section on census.)	142,000	9.14%	163,000	10.02%	186,000	10.99%
South Asian	116,000	7.47%	138,000	8.49%	156,000	9.21%
African	82,000	5.28%	97,000	5.97%	111,000	6.56%
East Asian (Note: Statistic includes total responses of "Chinese", "Korean", and "Japanese" under visible minority section on census.)	62,000	3.99%	71,000	4.37%	77,000	4.55%
Middle Eastern (Note: Statistic includes total responses of "West Asian" and "Arab" under visible minority section on census.)	23,000	1.48%	28,000	1.72%	33,000	1.95%
Latin American	20,000	1.29%	23,000	1.41%	26,000	1.54%
Other/multiracial (Note: Statistic includes total responses of "Visible minority, n.i.e." and "Multiple visible minorities" under visible minority section on census.)	18,000	1.16%	21,000	1.29%	24,000	1.42%
Projected Manitoba population	1,553,000	100%	1,626,000	100%	1,693,000	100%

== Visible minorities and Indigenous peoples ==
Population of Manitoba by visible minority and indigenous identity (2021):
1. European Canadian (59.6%)
2. Visible minority (22.2%)
3. First Nations (10.3%)
4. Métis (7.40%)
5. Other Indigenous (0.40%)

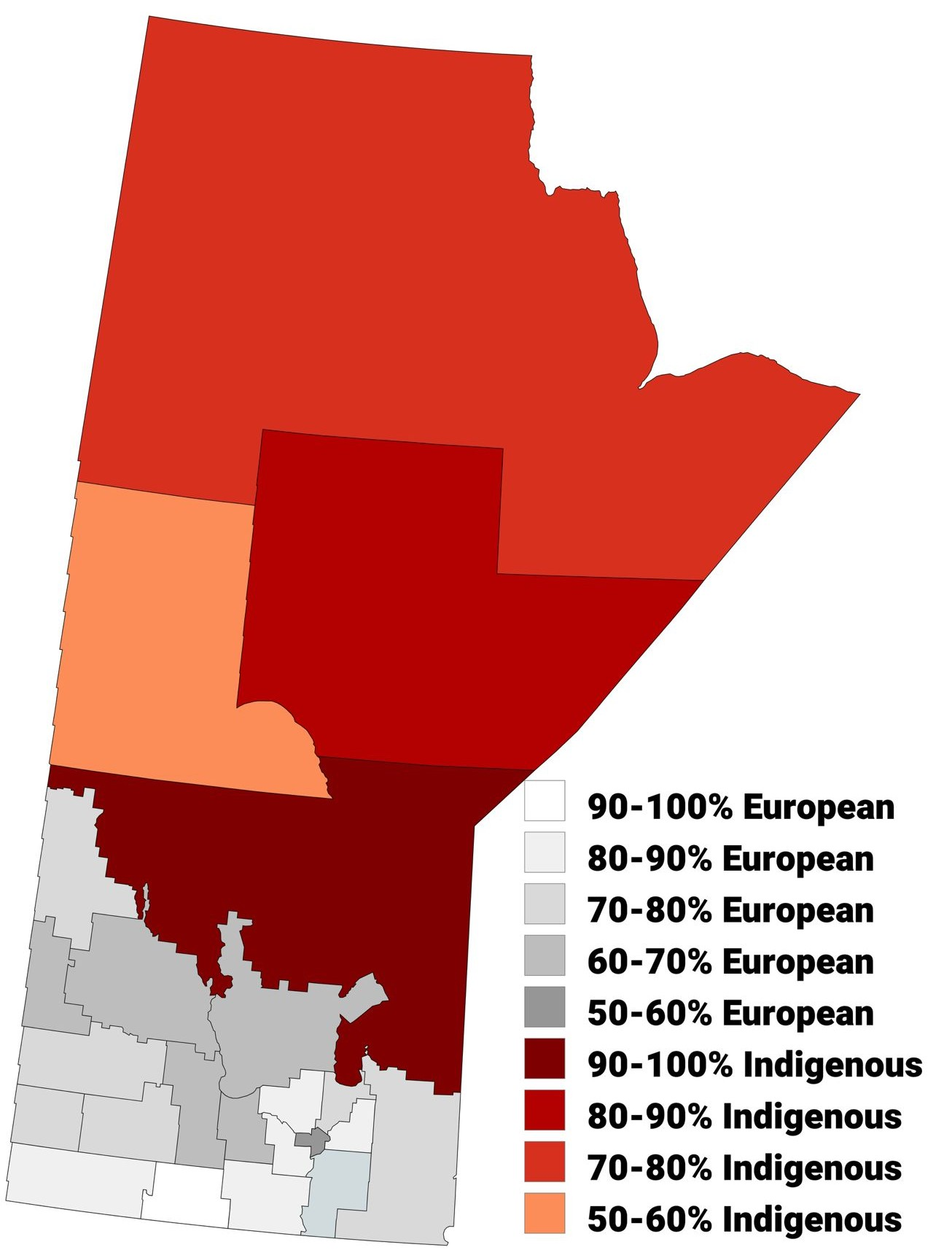
Largest panethnic groups in Manitoba by percentage of total population by census division, 2021 census

Visible minority & Indigenous population in Manitoba (1986–2021)
Group	Population	2021 census		2016 census		2011 census		2006 census		2001 census		1996 census		1991 census		1986 census	
Group	Population	Pop.	%	Pop.	%	Pop.	%	Pop.	%	Pop.	%	Pop.	%	Pop.	%	Pop.	%
Non-Indigenous / non-visible minority group	British Isles (Note: Including multiple responses.) (Note: 1996-present census populations for British Isles and French origins may be undercounts, due to the creation of the "Canadian" ethnic origin category. All citizens of Canada are classified as "Canadians" as defined by Canada's nationality laws. However, "Canadian" as an ethnic group has since 1996 been added to census questionnaires for possible ancestry. "Canadian" was included as an example on the English questionnaire and "Canadien" as an example on the French questionnaire. "The majority of respondents to this selection are from the eastern part of the country that was first settled. Respondents generally are visibly European (Anglophones and Francophones), however no-longer self identify with their ethnic ancestral origins. This response is attributed to a multitude or generational distance from ancestral lineage. Source 1: Jack Jedwab (April 2008). "Our 'Cense' of Self: the 2006 Census saw 1.6 million 'Canadian' Canadians Return to British and French origins" (PDF). Association for Canadian Studies. p. 2. Archived from the original (PDF) on October 2, 2011. "Virtually all persons who reported "Canadian" in 1996 had English or French as a mother tongue, were born in Canada and had both parents born inside Canada. This suggests that many of these respondents were people whose families have been in this country for several generations. In effect the "new Canadians" were persons that previously reported either British or French origins. Moreover in 1996 some 55% of people with both parents born in Canada reported Canadian (alone or in combination with other origins). By contrast, only 4% of people with both parents born outside Canada reported Canadian. Thus the Canadian response did not appeal widely to either immigrants or their children. Most important however was that nearly half of those persons reporting Canadian origin in 1996 were in Quebec this represented a majority of the mother tongue francophone population[...]In the 2001 Census, 11.7 million people, or 39% of the total population, reported Canadian as their ethnic origin, either alone or in combination with other origins. Some 4.9 million Quebecers out of 7.1 million individuals reported Canadian or "Canadien" thus accounting for nearly seven in ten persons (nearly eighty percent of francophones in Quebec)." Source 2: Don Kerr (2007). The Changing Face of Canada: Essential Readings in Population. Canadian Scholars' Press. pp. 313–317. ISBN 978-1-55130-322-2. Source 3: Jantzen (2006) Footnote 5: Note that Canadian and Canadien have been separated since the two terms mean different things. In English, it usually means someone whose family has been in Canada for multiple generations. In French it is referring to "Les Habitants", settlers of New France during the 17th and 18th centuries who earned their living primarily from agricultural labour. Source 4: Jantzen (2006): The reporting of French New World ancestries (Canadien, Québécois, and French-Canadian) is concentrated in the 4th+ generations; 79% of French-Canadian, 88% of Canadien and 90% of Québécois are in the 4th+generations category. Source 5: Jantzen (2005): According to Table 3, the 4th+ generations are highest because of a strong sense of belonging to their ethnic or cultural group among those respondents reporting the New World ancestries of Canadien and Québécois. Source 6: Jantzen (2006): For respondents of French and New World ancestries the pattern is different. Where generational data is available, it is possible to see that not all respondents reporting these ancestries report a high sense of belonging to their ethnic or cultural group. The high proportions are focused among those respondents that are in the 4th+ generations, and unlike with the British Isles example, the difference between the 2nd and 3rd generations to the 4th+ generation is more pronounced. Since these ancestries are concentrated in the 4th+ generations, their high proportions of sense of belonging to ethnic or cultural group push up the 4th+ generational results.)	397,130	30.38%	421,515	33.97%	434,225	36.98%	431,265	38.05%	404,565	36.66%	429,005	38.99%	484,655	44.9%	508,660	48.48%
Non-Indigenous / non-visible minority group	Western European	289,820	22.17%	286,990	23.13%	285,195	24.29%	282,715	24.94%	259,785	23.54%	261,440	23.76%	267,675	24.8%	244,775	23.33%
Non-Indigenous / non-visible minority group	Eastern European	262,205	20.06%	287,695	23.19%	275,485	23.46%	265,295	23.4%	236,405	21.42%	234,705	21.33%	234,065	21.68%	217,030	20.68%
Non-Indigenous / non-visible minority group	French	136,615	10.45%	149,735	12.07%	148,805	12.67%	148,795	13.13%	139,495	12.64%	147,805	13.43%	152,250	14.11%	145,575	13.87%
Non-Indigenous / non-visible minority group	Northern European	81,335	6.22%	80,300	6.47%	79,925	6.81%	77,765	6.86%	67,340	6.1%	68,135	6.19%	61,815	5.73%	53,465	5.1%
Non-Indigenous / non-visible minority group	Southern European	63,380	4.85%	59,915	4.83%	55,800	4.75%	51,210	4.52%	44,380	4.02%	41,685	3.79%	38,260	3.54%	32,775	3.12%
Non-Indigenous / non-visible minority group	European, n.i.e. & n.o.s.	17,020	1.3%	10,950	0.88%	15,270	1.3%	14,845	1.31%	16,335	1.48%	15,575	1.42%	17,610	1.63%	18,270	1.74%
Total non-Indigenous / non-visible minority population (Note: Single responses only unless otherwise specified.)		779,260	59.61%	800,540	64.52%	824,825	70.24%	849,020	74.9%	866,545	78.51%	895,870	81.42%	887,605	82.23%	909,315	86.66%
Visible minority (Note: Statistics Canada defines visible minorities as defined in the Employment Equity Act which defines visible minorities as "persons, other than Aboriginal peoples, who are non-Caucasian in race or non-white in colour".) group	Filipino	94,320	7.22%	79,820	6.43%	59,220	5.04%	37,785	3.33%	30,490	2.76%	25,910	2.35%	23,045	2.13%	17,015	1.62%
Visible minority group	South Asian	71,215	5.45%	42,060	3.39%	25,270	2.15%	16,565	1.46%	12,880	1.17%	12,110	1.1%	11,050	1.02%	7,660	0.73%
Visible minority group	Black	46,485	3.56%	30,335	2.44%	19,610	1.67%	15,660	1.38%	12,820	1.16%	10,775	0.98%	10,840	1%	8,480	0.81%
Visible minority group	Chinese	25,395	1.94%	22,540	1.82%	17,025	1.45%	13,705	1.21%	11,930	1.08%	12,335	1.12%	12,585	1.17%	7,835	0.75%
Visible minority group	Latin American	12,835	0.98%	9,895	0.8%	9,140	0.78%	6,275	0.55%	4,775	0.43%	4,100	0.37%	3,995	0.37%	1,570	0.15%
Visible minority group	Southeast Asian	11,375	0.87%	8,570	0.69%	7,565	0.64%	5,670	0.5%	5,480	0.5%	4,520	0.41%	5,150	0.48%	4,085	0.39%
Visible minority group	Multiple visible minorities	8,455	0.65%	6,480	0.52%	3,975	0.34%	3,265	0.29%	1,860	0.17%	1,470	0.13%	1,925	0.18%	1,290	0.12%
Visible minority group	Arab	7,815	0.6%	5,030	0.41%	3,240	0.28%	2,320	0.2%	1,230	0.11%	—N/a	—N/a	—N/a	—N/a	—N/a	—N/a
Visible minority group	Korean	4,320	0.33%	4,375	0.35%	3,045	0.26%	2,190	0.19%	1,040	0.09%	1,050	0.1%	970	0.09%	600	0.06%
Visible minority group	West Asian	3,445	0.26%	2,690	0.22%	2,040	0.17%	1,960	0.17%	880	0.08%	—N/a	—N/a	—N/a	—N/a	—N/a	—N/a
Visible minority group	Japanese	1,860	0.14%	1,845	0.15%	1,745	0.15%	2,010	0.18%	1,665	0.15%	1,665	0.15%	1,415	0.13%	1,505	0.14%
Visible minority group	Visible minority, n.i.e.	3,215	0.25%	3,195	0.26%	1,765	0.15%	1,690	0.15%	2,070	0.19%	1,510	0.14%	45	0%	2,980	0.28%
Visible minority group	Arab/West Asian	—N/a	—N/a	—N/a	—N/a	—N/a	—N/a	—N/a	—N/a	—N/a	—N/a	1,895	0.17%	3,320	0.31%	1,735	0.17%
Total visible minority population		290,735	22.24%	216,850	17.48%	153,625	13.08%	109,100	9.62%	87,110	7.89%	77,350	7.03%	74,335	6.89%	54,755	5.22%
Indigenous (Note: Statistics Canada defines Indigenous identity as persons who identify with the Indigenous Peoples of Canada.) group	First Nations	134,890	10.32%	130,505	10.52%	114,230	9.73%	100,645	8.88%	90,340	8.19%	80,615	7.33%	76,370 (Note: Including multiple Indigenous responses.)	7.08%	51,440	4.9%
Indigenous group	Métis	96,725	7.4%	89,355	7.2%	78,830	6.71%	71,805	6.33%	56,795	5.15%	45,365	4.12%	45,575	4.22%	28,915	2.76%
Indigenous group	Multiple Indigenous responses	2,935	0.22%	2,020	0.16%	1,200	0.1%	680	0.06%	500	0.05%	840	0.08%	—N/a	—N/a	4,515	4515%
Indigenous group	Indigenous responses, n.i.e.	1,905	0.15%	820	0.07%	1,055	0.09%	1,695	0.15%	2,060	0.19%	—N/a	—N/a	—N/a	—N/a	—N/a	—N/a
Indigenous group	Inuk (Inuit)	730	0.06%	610	0.05%	580	0.05%	565	0.05%	340	0.03%	245	0.02%	900	0.08%	380	0.04%
Total Indigenous population		237,190	18.15%	223,310	18%	195,895	16.68%	175,395	15.47%	150,040	13.59%	127,070	11.55%	117,455	10.88%	85,250	8.12%
Total responses		1,307,185	97.39%	1,240,700	97.05%	1,174,345	97.19%	1,133,515	98.7%	1,103,695	98.58%	1,100,290	98.78%	1,079,395	98.85%	1,049,320	98.71%
Total population		1,342,153	100%	1,278,365	100%	1,208,268	100%	1,148,401	100%	1,119,583	100%	1,113,898	100%	1,091,942	100%	1,063,016	100%

== Language ==
=== Knowledge of languages ===
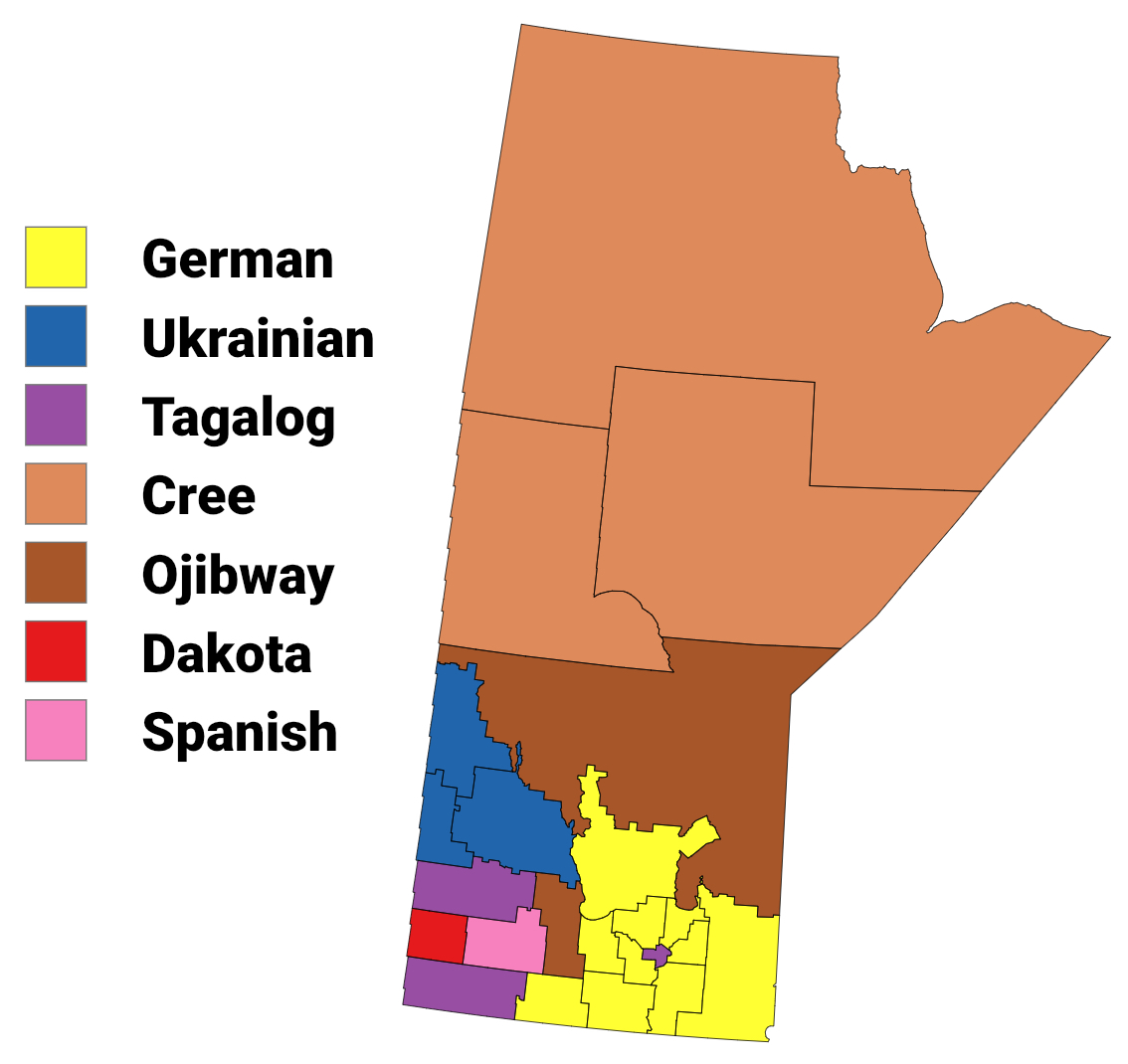
Largest non-official language known in Manitoba by census division, 2021 census

Top languages known in Manitoba 2021 census (Note: The question on knowledge of languages allows for multiple responses. The following figures are from the 2021 Canadian census.)
Language	Percent
English	98.60%
French	8.55%
Tagalog	5.62%
Punjabi	3.28%
German (Note: Including total responses to all High German languages.)	3.26%
Hindi (Note: Note: Hindi and Urdu form mutually intelligible registers of the Hindustani language.)	2.06%
Spanish	1.79%
Chinese (Note: Including total responses to all Chinese languages and dialects.)	1.78%
Plautdietsch–Low German	1.42%
Ojibway–Potawatomi	1.25%

Top languages known in Manitoba 1991 census (Note: The question on knowledge of languages allows for multiple responses. The following figures are from the 1991 Canadian census.)
Language	Percent
English	98.56%
French	9.33%
German	7.89%
Ukrainian	4.72%
Cree (Note: Including total responses to all Cree–Innu language dialects.)	2.40%
Tagalog	1.78%
Polish	1.58%
Ojibway–Potawatomi	1.15%
Chinese	1.02%
Spanish	0.85%

The question on knowledge of languages allows for multiple responses, and first appeared on the 1991 Canadian census. (Note: The 1991 Census was the first to ask Canadians whether they could conduct a conversation in a language other than English or French.)

Knowledge of Languages in Manitoba (1991–2021)
Language	2021 Canadian census		2016 Canadian census		2011 Canadian census		2006 Canadian census		2001 Canadian census		1996 Canadian census		1991 Canadian census	
Language	Pop.	%	Pop.	%	Pop.	%	Pop.	%	Pop.	%	Pop.	%	Pop.	%
English	1,288,950	98.6%	1,223,665	98.63%	1,177,475	98.69%	1,121,090	98.9%	1,093,120	99.04%	1,086,960	98.79%	1,063,900	98.56%
French	111,790	8.55%	108,560	8.75%	104,630	8.77%	105,455	9.3%	104,085	9.43%	104,635	9.51%	100,700	9.33%
Tagalog	73,440	5.62%	64,165	5.17%	48,060	4.03%	28,945	2.55%	23,795	2.16%	20,980	1.91%	19,205	1.78%
Punjabi	42,820	3.28%	22,900	1.85%	12,555	1.05%	7,600	0.67%	6,305	0.57%	5,445	0.49%	4,150	0.38%
German	42,685	3.27%	64,795	5.22%	66,930	5.61%	79,280	6.99%	77,015	6.98%	79,850	7.26%	85,200	7.89%
Hindi	26,985	2.06%	12,900	1.04%	7,520	0.63%	4,360	0.38%	3,445	0.31%	2,790	0.25%	2,350	0.22%
Spanish	23,440	1.79%	20,605	1.66%	19,165	1.61%	15,975	1.41%	12,890	1.17%	9,975	0.91%	9,130	0.85%
Chinese	23,210	1.78%	20,475	1.65%	16,245	1.36%	13,030	1.15%	10,905	0.99%	11,075	1.01%	10,960	1.02%
Plautdietsch–Low German	18,585	1.42%	—N/a	—N/a	—N/a	—N/a	—N/a	—N/a	—N/a	—N/a	—N/a	—N/a	—N/a	—N/a
Ojibway–Potawatomi	16,395	1.25%	17,710	1.43%	17,870	1.5%	18,420	1.63%	17,680	1.6%	14,365	1.31%	12,395	1.15%
Cree	16,120	1.23%	20,975	1.69%	23,470	1.97%	24,570	2.17%	24,665	2.23%	28,835	2.62%	25,940	2.4%
Ukrainian	14,845	1.14%	17,095	1.38%	21,565	1.81%	28,015	2.47%	35,385	3.21%	41,505	3.77%	50,985	4.72%
Russian	14,830	1.13%	13,455	1.08%	9,305	0.78%	6,405	0.57%	4,150	0.38%	3,345	0.3%	3,430	0.32%
Arabic	10,275	0.79%	6,650	0.54%	5,065	0.42%	3,145	0.28%	2,045	0.19%	1,155	0.1%	1,010	0.09%
Portuguese	9,595	0.73%	8,460	0.68%	7,125	0.6%	7,645	0.67%	8,325	0.75%	8,945	0.81%	8,220	0.76%
Polish	7,045	0.54%	7,655	0.62%	8,420	0.71%	11,305	1%	12,775	1.16%	14,770	1.34%	17,045	1.58%
Urdu	6,800	0.52%	4,600	0.37%	2,720	0.23%	1,960	0.17%	1,130	0.1%	880	0.08%	1,115	0.1%
Gujarati	6,535	0.5%	3,905	0.31%	1,460	0.12%	960	0.08%	550	0.05%	480	0.04%	735	0.07%
Vietnamese	6,255	0.48%	4,905	0.4%	3,900	0.33%	3,935	0.35%	4,095	0.37%	3,150	0.29%	4,150	0.38%
Italian	5,230	0.4%	5,350	0.43%	5,675	0.48%	6,625	0.58%	7,105	0.64%	7,050	0.64%	7,395	0.69%
Korean	4,330	0.33%	4,240	0.34%	3,000	0.25%	2,190	0.19%	950	0.09%	870	0.08%	830	0.08%
Hebrew	3,800	0.29%	3,370	0.27%	2,690	0.23%	2,005	0.18%	1,635	0.15%	1,885	0.17%	1,825	0.17%
Serbo-Croatian	2,920	0.22%	3,490	0.28%	3,440	0.29%	3,585	0.32%	3,720	0.34%	2,695	0.24%	1,035	0.1%
Dutch	2,845	0.22%	3,120	0.25%	3,695	0.31%	4,360	0.38%	4,825	0.44%	4,995	0.45%	6,035	0.56%
Persian (Note: Including total responses to all Persian Language dialects.)	2,615	0.2%	2,295	0.18%	2,010	0.17%	2,005	0.18%	875	0.08%	780	0.07%	730	0.07%
Greek	1,625	0.12%	2,010	0.16%	1,505	0.13%	2,030	0.18%	1,765	0.16%	1,765	0.16%	2,185	0.2%
Creoles	1,580	0.12%	1,310	0.11%	900	0.08%	1,070	0.09%	525	0.05%	295	0.03%	175	0.02%
Japanese	1,510	0.12%	1,160	0.09%	970	0.08%	1,285	0.11%	1,080	0.1%	990	0.09%	760	0.07%
Hungarian	1,260	0.1%	1,235	0.1%	1,330	0.11%	1,940	0.17%	2,035	0.18%	2,435	0.22%	2,725	0.25%
Scandinavian (Note: Total responses to all Scandinavian–North Germanic languages, including Danish, Icelandic, Norwegian, and Swedish.)	1,215	0.09%	1,390	0.11%	1,480	0.12%	2,290	0.2%	2,565	0.23%	3,765	0.34%	4,730	0.44%
Tamil	1,100	0.08%	655	0.05%	605	0.05%	365	0.03%	360	0.03%	470	0.04%	455	0.04%
Romanian	665	0.05%	785	0.06%	955	0.08%	870	0.08%	795	0.07%	955	0.09%	935	0.09%
Finnish	205	0.02%	265	0.02%	230	0.02%	360	0.03%	365	0.03%	395	0.04%	530	0.05%
Total responses	1,307,190	97.4%	1,240,700	97.1%	1,193,095	98.7%	1,133,515	98.7%	1,103,700	98.6%	1,100,290	98.8%	1,079,395	98.9%
Total population	1,342,153	100%	1,278,365	100%	1,208,268	100%	1,148,401	100%	1,119,583	100%	1,113,898	100%	1,091,942	100%

=== Mother tongue ===
The 2006 census showed a population of 1,148,401. Of the 1,118,690 singular responses to the census question concerning mother tongue the languages most commonly reported were:

Mother tongue in Manitoba
Language	2006		2001		1931	
Language	Pop.	%	Pop.	%	Pop.	%
English	838,415	75.0%	823,910	75.8%	399,009	56.99%
German	67,030	6.0%	63,215	5.8%	57,312	8.19%
French	43,955	3.9%	44,335	4.1%	42,499	6.07%
Algonquian languages	33,995	3.0%	31,705	2.9%	—N/a	—N/a
Cree	19,105	1.7%	18,110	1.7%	—N/a	—N/a
Ojibway	9,330	0.8%	8,885	0.8%	—N/a	—N/a
Oji-Cree	5,430	0.5%	4,605	0.4%	—N/a	—N/a
Tagalog (Filipino/Pilipino)	22,490	2.0%	18,385	1.7%	—N/a	—N/a
Ukrainian	21,950	2.0%	26,540	2.4%	82,908	11.84%
Chinese	11,045	1.0%	9,190	0.9%	1,211	0.17%
Cantonese	3,105	0.3%	2,530	0.2%	—N/a	—N/a
Mandarin	1,470	0.1%	700	0.1%	—N/a	—N/a
Polish	8,870	0.8%	9,915	0.9%	31,758	4.54%
Panjabi (Punjabi)	6,340	0.6%	5,420	<0.1%	13	0%
Italian	4,775	0.4%	4,945	0.5%	1,934	0.28%
Dutch	3,835	0.3%	3,975	0.4%	5,546	0.79%
Russian	3,450	0.3%	1,730	0.2%	3,746	0.54%
Serbo-Croatian languages	2,880	0.3%	3,020	0.3%	147	0.02%
Croatian	1,420	0.1%	1,595	0.2%	—N/a	—N/a
Serbian	585	0.1%	400	<0.1%	—N/a	—N/a
Bosnian	565	0.1%	—N/a	—N/a	—N/a	—N/a
Serbo-Croatian	340	<0.1%	1,025	0.1%	—N/a	—N/a
Vietnamese	2,740	0.2%	2,950	0.3%	—N/a	—N/a
Arabic	2,125	0.2%	1,285	0.1%	320	0.05%
Scandinavian languages	2,040	0.2%	2,005	0.2%	24,481	3.5%
Icelandic	1,040	0.1%	1,135	0.1%	11,578	1.65%
Danish	535	0.1%	365	<0.1%	2,187	0.31%
Swedish	310	<0.1%	330	<0.1%	7,088	1.01%
Norwegian	150	<0.1%	170	<0.1%	3,628	0.52%
Korean	1,950	0.2%	870	0.1%	—N/a	—N/a
Hungarian	1,800	0.2%	1,840	0.2%	1,638	0.23%
Persian	1,775	0.2%	685	0.1%	—N/a	—N/a
Greek	1,635	0.2%	1,310	0.1%	230	0.03%
Amharic	1,440	0.1%	790	0.1%	—N/a	—N/a
Urdu	1,190	0.1%	545	0.1%	—N/a	—N/a
Hindi	1,120	0.1%	710	0.1%	—N/a	—N/a
Lao	1,035	0.1%	1,140	0.1%	—N/a	—N/a
Athapaskan languages	900	0.1%	860	0.1%	—N/a	—N/a
Dene	890	0.1%	845	0.1%	—N/a	—N/a
Czech	895	0.1%	905	0.1%	514	0.07%
Gujarati	890	0.1%	405	<0.1%	—N/a	—N/a
Bantu languages	700	0.1%	410	<0.1%	—N/a	—N/a
Swahili	205	<0.1%	115	<0.1%	—N/a	—N/a
Japanese	700	0.1%	550	0.1%	519	0.07%
Romanian	655	0.1%	595	0.1%	1,181	0.17%
Flemish	650	0.1%	795	0.1%	5,067	0.72%
Ilocano	645	0.1%	—N/a	—N/a	—N/a	—N/a
Creole	640	0.1%	220	<0.1%	—N/a	—N/a
Yiddish	640	0.1%	1,065	0.1%	19,187	2.74%
Dakotan languages	630	0.1%	730	0.1%	—N/a	—N/a
African languages n.i.e.	540	0.1%	230	<0.1%	—N/a	—N/a
Somali	540	0.1%	155	<0.1%	—N/a	—N/a
Germanic languages n.i.e. (Note: Including Austrian not otherwise specified (907))	520	0.1%	410	<0.1%	907	0.13%
Khmer (Cambodian)	495	0.1%	350	<0.1%	—N/a	—N/a
Slovak	465	<0.1%	665	0.1%	514	0.07%

Note: "n.i.e.": not included elsewhere

There were also about 430 single-language responses for Bisayan languages; 395 for Niger–Congo languages n.i.e.; and 350 for Tigrigna; as well as about 345 for non-verbal languages (sign languages); 340 for Bengali; 330 for Finnish; 325 for Sinhala; 310 for Kurdish; 275 for Tamil; 260 for Slovenian; 230 for Latvian; 220 for Hebrew; and about 220 as well for Slavic languages n.i.e.; and 210 for Indo-Iranian languages n.i.e.; 195 for Malayo-Polynesian languages n.i.e; 180 for Oromo; 170 for Pampango; 155 for Celtic languages; 155 for Macedonian; 140 for Inuktitut; 135 for Lithuanian; 120 for Bulgarian; and about 120 as well for Malayalam. {Mother tongues of more than 114 persons (0.01%) are listed.} In addition to the single-language responses detailed above, about 34,935 people reported having more than one mother tongue. There were about 11,675 responses of English and a non-official language; 465 of French and a non-official language; 2,630 of both English and French; and 85 of English, French and a non-official language. Approximately 2,555 people reported having Tagalog as a dual mother tongue; while about 2,060 people reported having German; 1,510 people reported having Cree; 1,385 Ukrainian; 645 Ojibway; 475 Spanish; 365 Portuguese; 310 Polish; and about 280 people reported having Panjabi, as a dual mother tongue. {Dual mother tongues of more than 228 persons (0.02%) are listed.}

== Religion ==
Religious groups in Manitoba (1981−2021)
Religious group	2021 Canadian census		2011 Canadian census		2001 Canadian census		1991 Canadian census		1981 Canadian census	
Religious group	Pop.	%	Pop.	%	Pop.	%	Pop.	%	Pop.	%
Christianity	708,850	54.23%	803,640	68.43%	859,060	77.83%	898,560	83.25%	913,370	90.1%
Irreligion	480,315	36.74%	311,105	26.49%	205,865	18.65%	148,170	13.73%	76,285	7.53%
Sikhism	35,470	2.71%	10,200	0.87%	5,485	0.5%	3,495	0.32%	1,685	0.17%
Islam	26,430	2.02%	12,405	1.06%	5,095	0.46%	3,525	0.33%	1,925	0.19%
Hinduism	18,355	1.4%	7,720	0.66%	3,835	0.35%	3,470	0.32%	1,750	0.17%
Judaism	11,565	0.88%	11,110	0.95%	13,035	1.18%	13,670	1.27%	15,670	1.55%
Indigenous spirituality	10,190	0.78%	7,155	0.61%	3,410	0.31%	1,175	0.11%	220	0.02%
Buddhism	7,440	0.57%	6,770	0.58%	5,745	0.52%	5,255	0.49%	2,015	0.2%
Other	8,570	0.66%	4,245	0.36%	2,165	0.2%	2,070	0.19%	785	0.08%
Total responses	1,307,190	97.4%	1,174,345	97.19%	1,103,700	98.58%	1,079,390	98.85%	1,013,705	98.78%
Total population	1,342,152	100%	1,208,268	100%	1,119,583	100%	1,091,942	100%	1,026,241	100%

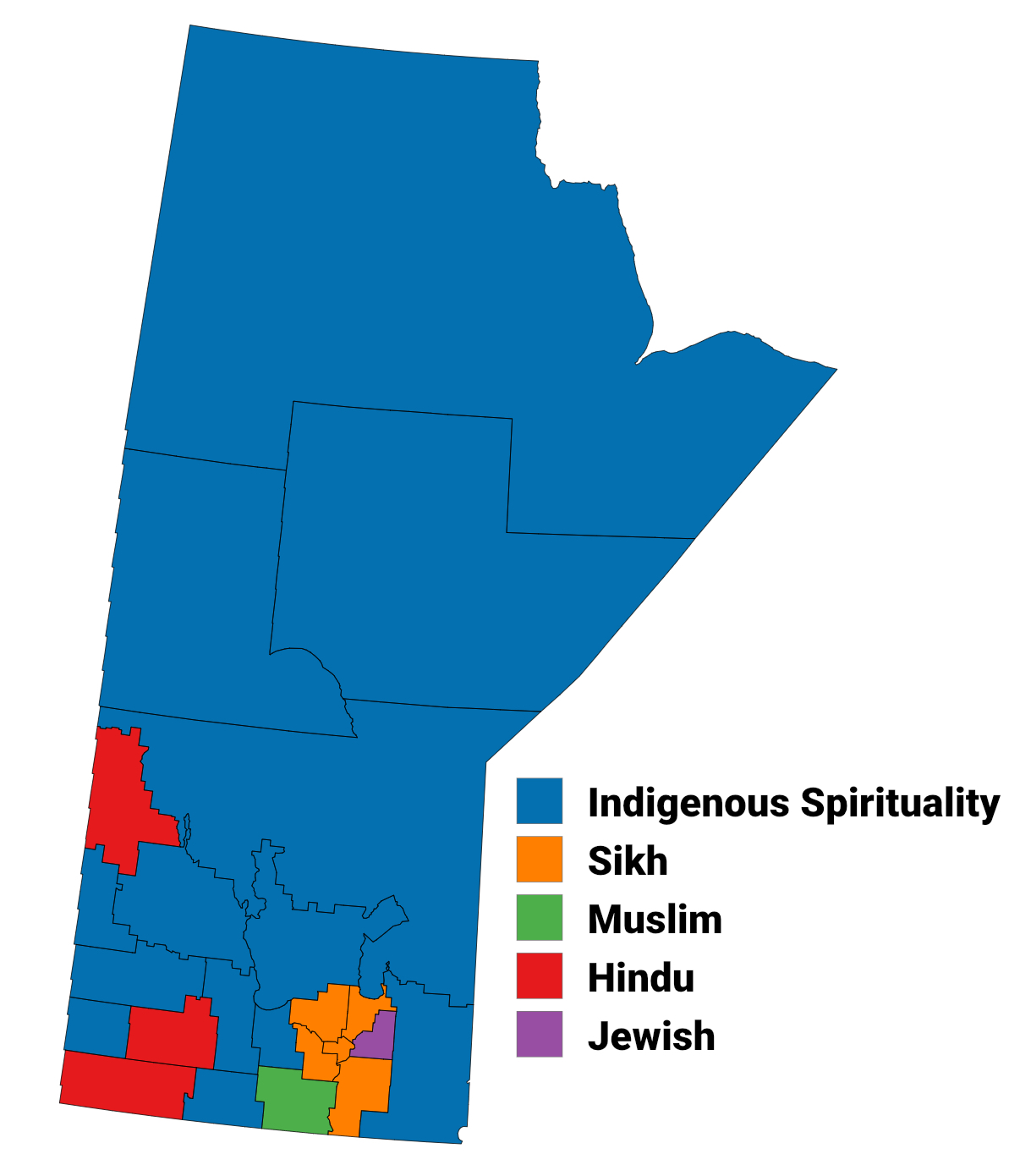
Largest non-Christian religion in Manitoba by census division, 2021 census

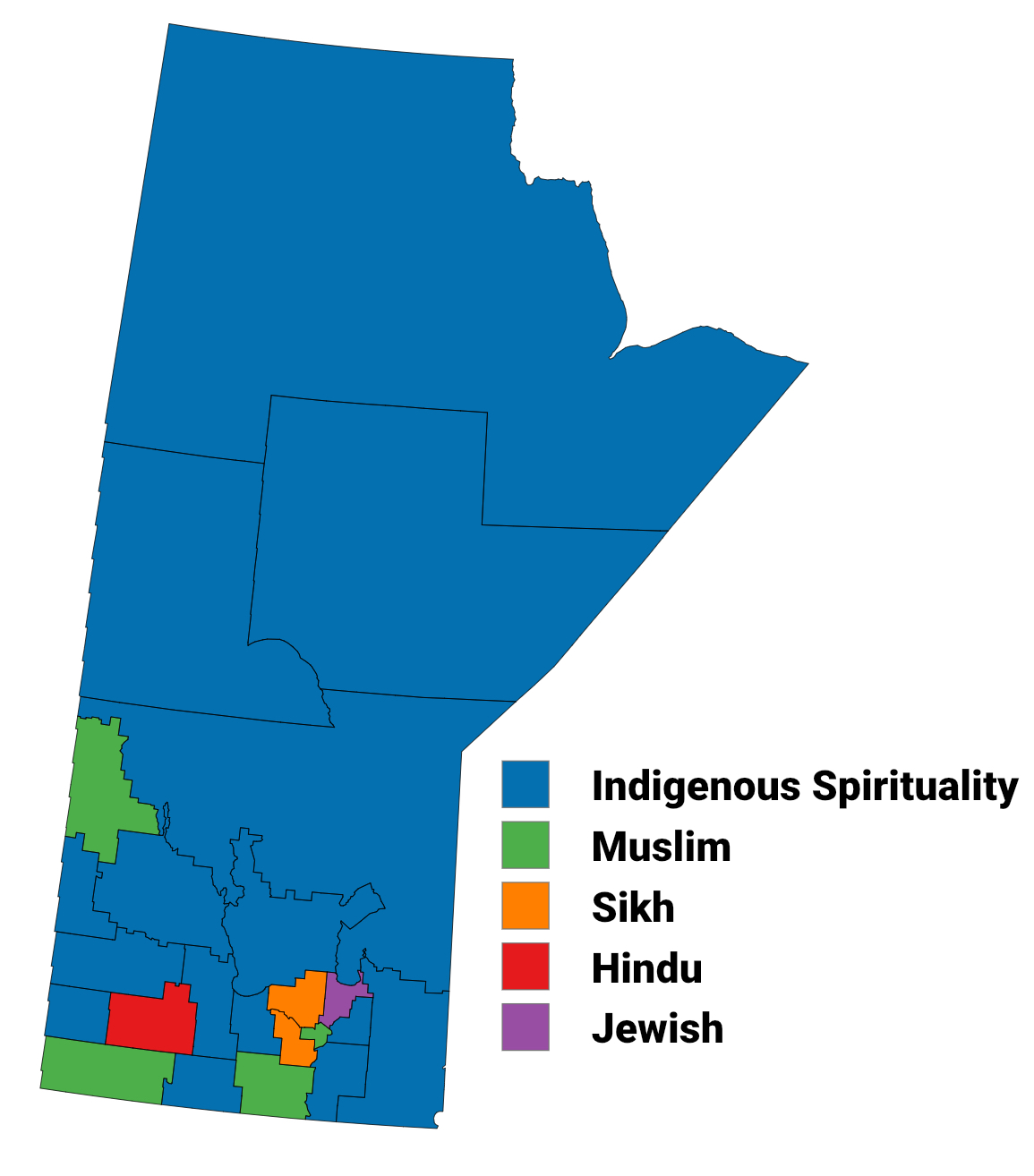
Largest non-Christian religion in Manitoba by census division, 2011 census

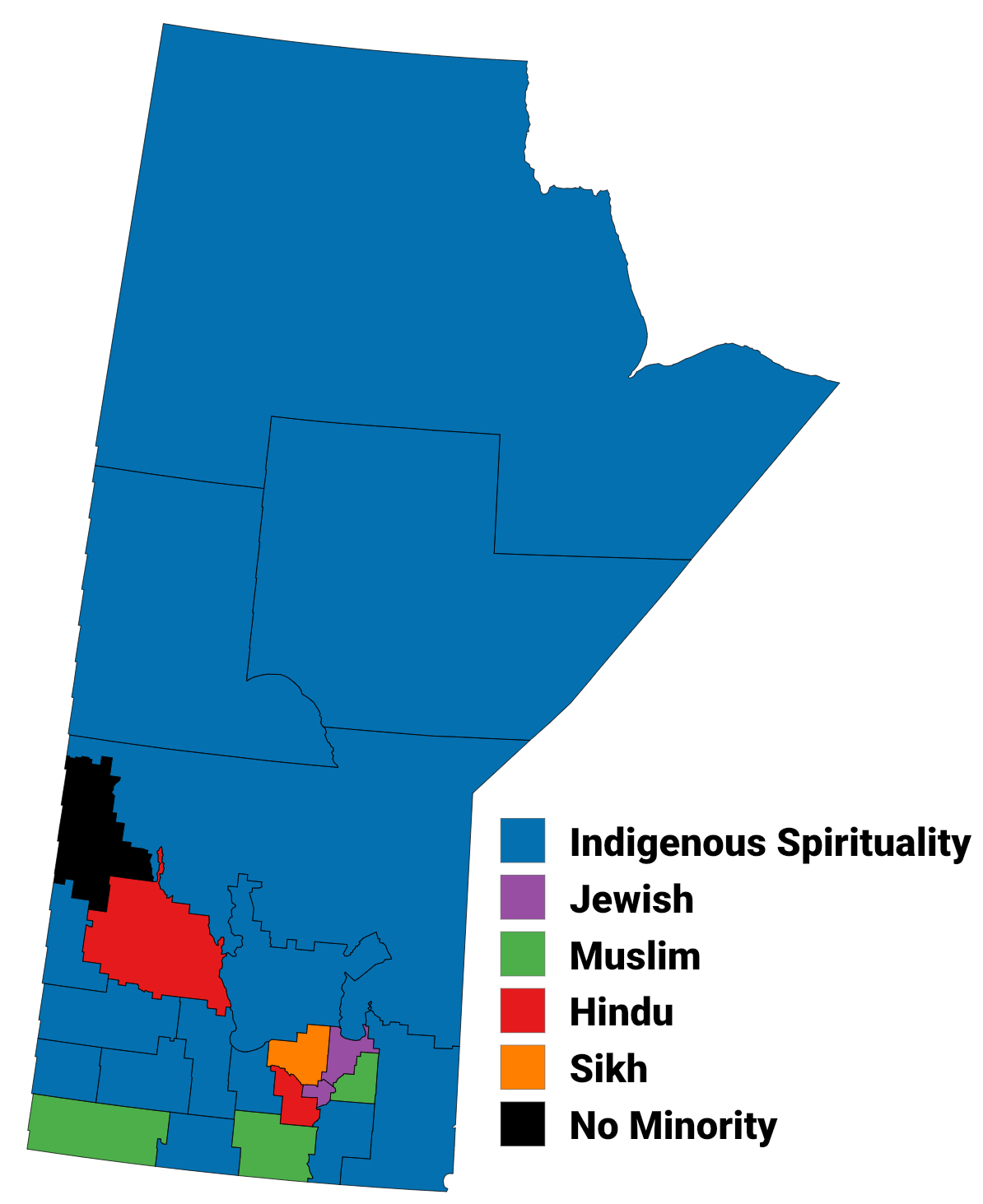
Largest non-Christian religion in Manitoba by census division, 2001 census

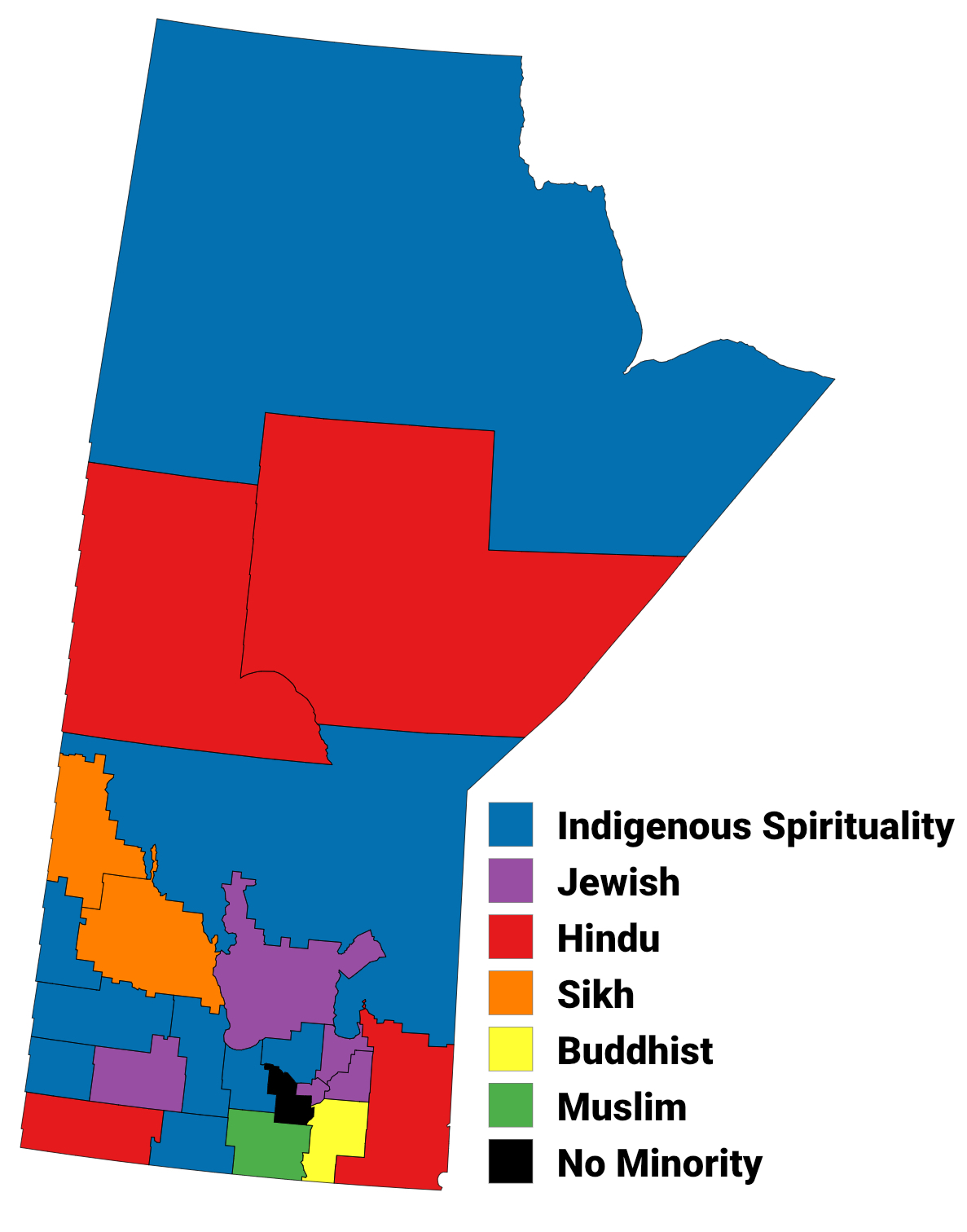
Largest non-Christian religion in Manitoba by census division, 1991 census

== Migration ==
=== Immigration ===
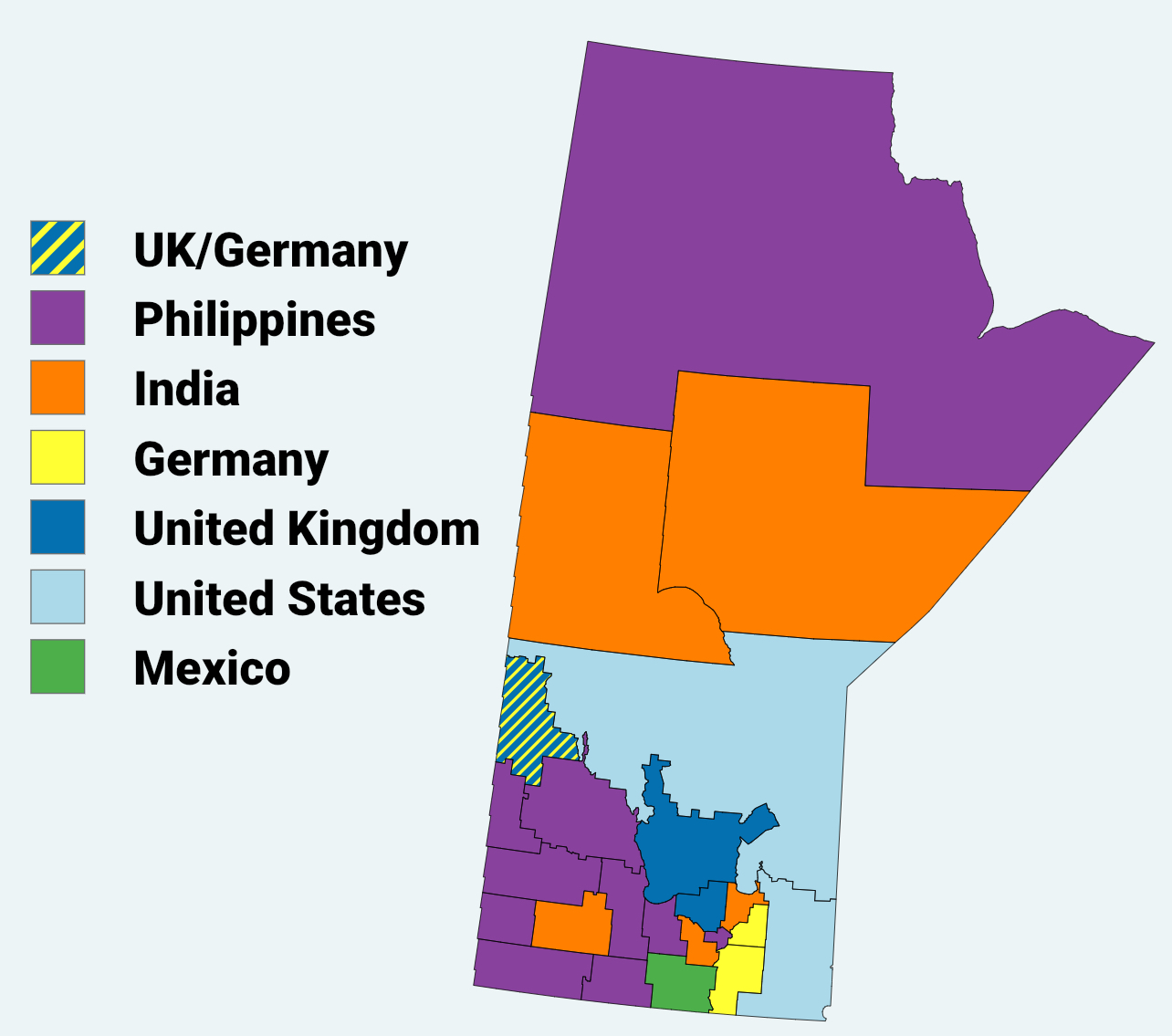
Largest nation of birth of immigrants by census division, 2021 Census

Manitoba immigration statistics (1881–2021)
Census year	Immigrant percentage	Immigrant population	Total responses	Total population	Source(s)
1881 Canadian census	27.08%	16,860	62,260	62,260	
1886 Manitoban census	29.15%	31,672	108,640	108,640	
1891 Canadian census	29.06%	44,320	152,506	152,506	
1901 Canadian census	29.13%	74,352	255,211	255,211	
1911 Canadian census	41.36%	190,840	461,394	461,394	
1921 Canadian census	36.45%	222,372	610,118	610,118	
1931 Canadian census	33.79%	236,589	700,139	700,139	
1941 Canadian census	26.53%	193,586	729,744	729,744	
1951 Canadian census	21.68%	168,354	776,541	776,541	
1961 Canadian census	18.44%	169,998	921,686	921,686	
1971 Canadian census	15.3%	151,250	988,245	988,247	
1981 Canadian census	14.41%	146,060	1,013,700	1,026,241	
1986 Canadian census	13.55%	142,225	1,049,320	1,063,016	
1991 Canadian census	12.84%	138,595	1,079,395	1,091,942	
1996 Canadian census	12.35%	135,940	1,100,290	1,113,898	
2001 Canadian census	12.11%	133,660	1,103,700	1,119,583	
2006 Canadian census	13.34%	151,230	1,133,515	1,148,401	
2011 Canadian census	15.71%	184,505	1,174,345	1,208,268	
2016 Canadian census	18.33%	227,465	1,240,700	1,278,365	
2021 Canadian census	19.71%	257,620	1,307,190	1,342,153	

The 2021 census reported that immigrants (individuals born outside Canada) comprise 257,620 persons or 19.7 percent of the total population of Manitoba.

Immigrants in Manitoba by country of birth
Country of birth	2021 census		2016 census		2011 census		2006 census		2001 census		1996 census		1991 census		1986 census		1981 census		1971 census		1961 census		1951 census		1941 census		1931 census	
Country of birth	Pop.	%	Pop.	%	Pop.	%	Pop.	%	Pop.	%	Pop.	%	Pop.	%	Pop.	%	Pop.	%	Pop.	%	Pop.	%	Pop.	%	Pop.	%	Pop.	%
Philippines	70,265	27.3%	61,950	27.2%	45,240	24.5%	25,485	16.9%	20,345	15.2%	17,980	13.2%	16,180	11.7%	12,380	8.7%	9,940	6.8%	—N/a	—N/a	—N/a	—N/a	—N/a	—N/a	—N/a	—N/a	—N/a	—N/a
India	32,160	12.5%	21,990	9.7%	12,175	6.6%	6,765	4.5%	5,205	3.9%	4,845	3.6%	4,205	3%	3,735	2.6%	2,510	1.7%	1,110	0.7%	230	0.1%	157	0.1%	207	0.1%	269	0.1%
United Kingdom	10,995	4.3%	11,665	5.1%	13,235	7.2%	15,225	10.1%	15,305	11.5%	18,130	13.3%	20,505	14.8%	25,415	17.9%	29,815	20.4%	41,160	27.2%	49,257	29%	59,011	35.1%	73,694	38.1%	94,111	39.8%
China & Taiwan	10,535 (Note: China: 10,250 / Taiwan: 285)	4.1%	9,465 (Note: China: 9,250 / Taiwan: 215)	4.2%	7,485 (Note: China: 7,205 / Taiwan: 280)	4.1%	4,455 (Note: China: 4,310 / Taiwan: 145)	2.9%	3,900 (Note: China: 3,715 / Taiwan: 185)	2.9%	3,635 (Note: China: 3,435 / Taiwan: 200)	2.7%	3,065 (Note: China: 2,935 / Taiwan: 130)	2.2%	2,340 (Note: China: 2,255 / Taiwan: 85)	1.6%	2,105 (Note: China: 1,100 / Taiwan: 1,005)	1.4%	1,550	1%	1,260	0.7%	890	0.5%	1,071	0.6%	1,598	0.7%
Germany & Austria	9,785 (Note: Germany: 9,365 / Austria: 420)	3.8%	10,840 (Note: Germany: 10,390 / Austria: 450)	4.8%	11,340 (Note: Germany: 10,850 / Austria: 490)	6.1%	9,635 (Note: Germany: 9,045 / Austria: 590)	6.4%	8,795 (Note: Germany: 8,115 / Austria: 680)	6.6%	9,410 (Note: Germany: 8,600 / Austria: 810)	6.9%	9,255 (Note: Germany: 8,125 / Austria: 1,130)	6.7%	11,080 (Note: Germany: 9,540 / Austria: 1,540)	7.8%	12,085 (Note: Germany: 9,855 / Austria: 2,230)	8.3%	15,325	10.1%	24,008	14.1%	10,650	6.3%	15,724	8.1%	12,555	5.3%
Ukraine & Russia	9,600 (Note: Ukraine: 5,370 / Russia: 4,230)	3.7%	9,005 (Note: Ukraine: 4,760 / Russia: 4,245)	4%	7,905 (Note: Ukraine: 4,015 / Russia: 3,890)	4.3%	7,470 (Note: Ukraine: 4,330 / Russia: 3,140)	4.9%	6,545 (Note: Ukraine: 4,070 / Russia: 2,475)	4.9%	7,970 (Note: Includes total persons born in all republics of the Soviet Union.)	5.9%	8,970	6.5%	11,345	8%	14,340	9.8%	21,035	13.9%	25,822	15.2%	33,566	19.9%	21,823	11.3%	24,318	10.3%
Nigeria & Ghana	8,955 (Note: Nigeria: 8,545 / Ghana: 410)	3.5%	4,070 (Note: Nigeria: 3,825 / Ghana: 245)	1.8%	1,675 (Note: Nigeria: 1,440 / Ghana: 235)	0.9%	550 (Note: Nigeria: 360 / Ghana: 190)	0.4%	430 (Note: Nigeria: 325 / Ghana: 105)	0.3%	370 (Note: Nigeria: 205 / Ghana: 165)	0.3%	285	0.2%	195	0.1%	280	0.2%	—N/a	—N/a	—N/a	—N/a	—N/a	—N/a	—N/a	—N/a	—N/a	—N/a
United States	6,705	2.6%	7,100	3.1%	7,415	4%	7,090	4.7%	6,910	5.2%	7,905	5.8%	8,485	6.1%	10,065	7.1%	11,405	7.8%	12,090	8%	12,262	7.2%	13,231	7.9%	15,740	8.1%	17,903	7.6%
Ethiopia & Eritrea	5,890 (Note: Ethiopia: 2,945 / Eritrea: 2,945)	2.3%	3,930 (Note: Ethiopia: 2,525 / Eritrea: 1,405)	1.7%	2,335 (Note: Ethiopia: 1,660 / Eritrea: 675)	1.3%	1,850 (Note: Ethiopia: 1,555 / Eritrea: 295)	1.2%	1,030 (Note: Ethiopia: 770 / Eritrea: 260)	0.8%	965	0.7%	740	0.5%	260	0.2%	—N/a	—N/a	—N/a	—N/a	—N/a	—N/a	—N/a	—N/a	—N/a	—N/a	—N/a	—N/a
Mexico	5,845	2.3%	6,650	2.9%	6,605	3.6%	6,160	4.1%	4,580	3.4%	4,350	3.2%	3,480	2.5%	3,245	2.3%	3,125	2.1%	—N/a	—N/a	—N/a	—N/a	—N/a	—N/a	—N/a	—N/a	—N/a	—N/a
Vietnam	4,575	1.8%	4,225	1.9%	3,440	1.9%	3,465	2.3%	3,485	2.6%	3,240	2.4%	4,475	3.2%	3,805	2.7%	2,675	1.8%	—N/a	—N/a	—N/a	—N/a	—N/a	—N/a	—N/a	—N/a	—N/a	—N/a
Poland	4,395	1.7%	5,280	2.3%	5,520	3%	7,355	4.9%	8,485	6.3%	10,040	7.4%	11,825	8.5%	13,105	9.2%	13,465	9.2%	16,895	11.2%	19,938	11.7%	24,023	14.3%	33,156	17.1%	44,347	18.7%
Pakistan	4,170	1.6%	3,125	1.4%	1,705	0.9%	1,205	0.8%	585	0.4%	385	0.3%	515	0.4%	445	0.3%	390	0.3%	130	0.1%	—N/a	—N/a	—N/a	—N/a	—N/a	—N/a	—N/a	—N/a
Portugal	4,040	1.6%	4,380	1.9%	4,060	2.2%	4,560	3%	5,160	3.9%	5,685	4.2%	5,370	3.9%	5,350	3.8%	5,865	4%	3,030	2%	—N/a	—N/a	—N/a	—N/a	—N/a	—N/a	—N/a	—N/a
Jamaica & Trinidad and Tobago	3,740 (Note: Jamaica: 2,110 / Trinidad and Tobago: 1,630)	1.5%	3,315 (Note: Jamaica: 1,805 / Trinidad and Tobago: 1,510)	1.5%	3,100 (Note: Jamaica: 1,350 / Trinidad and Tobago: 1,750)	1.7%	3,045 (Note: Jamaica: 1,435 / Trinidad and Tobago: 1,610)	2%	3,570 (Note: Jamaica: 1,625 / Trinidad and Tobago: 1,945)	2.7%	3,890 (Note: Jamaica: 1,585 / Trinidad and Tobago: 2,305)	2.9%	3,495 (Note: Jamaica: 1,770 / Trinidad and Tobago: 1,725)	2.5%	3,105 (Note: Jamaica: 1,455 / Trinidad and Tobago: 1,650)	2.2%	2,950	2%	1,520	1%	327 (Note: All individuals born in the British West Indies.)	0.2%	102	0.1%	98	0.1%	132	0.1%
El Salvador & Guatemala & Nicaragua	3,325 (Note: El Salvador: 2,575 / Guatemala: 395 / Nicaragua: 355)	1.3%	3,275 (Note: El Salvador: 2,485 / Guatemala: 495 / Nicaragua: 295)	1.4%	2,970 (Note: El Salvador: 2,400 / Guatemala: 370 / Nicaragua: 200)	1.6%	2,165 (Note: El Salvador: 1,475 / Guatemala: 340 / Nicaragua: 350)	1.4%	2,265 (Note: El Salvador: 1,610 / Guatemala: 245 / Nicaragua: 410)	1.7%	2,180 (Note: El Salvador: 1,570 / Guatemala: 280 / Nicaragua: 330)	1.6%	2,005 (Note: El Salvador: 1,435 / Guatemala: 195 / Nicaragua: 375)	1.4%	750 (Note: El Salvador: 605 / Guatemala: 55 / Nicaragua: 90)	0.5%	135	0.1%	—N/a	—N/a	—N/a	—N/a	—N/a	—N/a	—N/a	—N/a	—N/a	—N/a
Paraguay	3,115	1.2%	3,855	1.7%	3,510	1.9%	4,025	2.7%	2,470	1.8%	2,240	1.6%	2,650	1.9%	2,595	1.8%	1,510	1%	—N/a	—N/a	—N/a	—N/a	—N/a	—N/a	—N/a	—N/a	—N/a	—N/a
South Korea	2,955	1.1%	2,885	1.3%	2,215	1.2%	1,455	1%	515	0.4%	605	0.4%	650	0.5%	480	0.3%	215	0.1%	—N/a	—N/a	—N/a	—N/a	—N/a	—N/a	—N/a	—N/a	—N/a	—N/a
Former Yugoslavia	2,745	1.1%	2,985	1.3%	3,240	1.8%	3,540	2.3%	3,690	2.8%	3,305	2.4%	2,085	1.5%	2,120	1.5%	2,705	1.9%	2,380	1.6%	2,190	1.3%	683	0.4%	491	0.3%	693	0.3%
Italy	2,470	1%	2,755	1.2%	3,035	1.6%	3,450	2.3%	3,675	2.7%	3,840	2.8%	4,165	3%	4,490	3.2%	4,865	3.3%	5,260	3.5%	3,252	1.9%	969	0.6%	855	0.4%	1,000	0.4%
Syria & Lebanon	2,245 (Note: Syria: 1,900 / Lebanon: 345)	0.9%	1,065 (Note: Syria: 800 / Lebanon: 265)	0.5%	335 (Note: Syria: 205 / Lebanon: 130)	0.2%	255 (Note: Syria: 125 / Lebanon: 130)	0.2%	150 (Note: Syria: 65 / Lebanon: 85)	0.1%	110 (Note: Syria: 20 / Lebanon: 90)	0.1%	100 (Note: Syria: 20 / Lebanon: 80)	0.1%	165 (Note: Syria: 20 / Lebanon: 145)	0.1%	60	0%	—N/a	—N/a	—N/a	—N/a	—N/a	—N/a	164	0.1%	173	0.1%
Kazakhstan	2,180	0.8%	2,185	1%	1,260	0.7%	470	0.3%	100	0.1%	—N/a	—N/a	—N/a	—N/a	—N/a	—N/a	—N/a	—N/a	—N/a	—N/a	—N/a	—N/a	—N/a	—N/a	—N/a	—N/a	—N/a	—N/a
Netherlands	2,050	0.8%	2,245	1%	2,500	1.4%	3,015	2%	3,260	2.4%	3,070	2.3%	3,715	2.7%	3,775	2.7%	4,235	2.9%	4,715	3.1%	5,559	3.3%	2,293	1.4%	1,109	0.6%	1,444	0.6%
Brazil	1,810	0.7%	435	0.2%	370	0.2%	365	0.2%	230	0.2%	265	0.2%	360	0.3%	220	0.2%	250	0.2%	—N/a	—N/a	—N/a	—N/a	—N/a	—N/a	—N/a	—N/a	—N/a	—N/a
DR Congo & Cameroon	1,720 (Note: DR Congo: 1,420 / Cameroon: 300)	0.7%	1,440 (Note: DR Congo: 1,290 / Cameroon: 150)	0.6%	770 (Note: DR Congo: 705 / Cameroon: 65)	0.4%	310 (Note: DR Congo: 300 / Cameroon: 10)	0.2%	120 (Note: DR Congo: 110 / Cameroon: 10)	0.1%	75 (Note: DR Congo: 50 / Cameroon: 25)	0.1%	40	0%	50	0%	35	0%	—N/a	—N/a	—N/a	—N/a	—N/a	—N/a	—N/a	—N/a	—N/a	—N/a
Israel & Palestine	1,610	0.6%	1495	0.7%	830	0.4%	370	0.2%	190	0.1%	200	0.1%	195	0.1%	165	0.1%	220	0.2%	—N/a	—N/a	—N/a	—N/a	—N/a	—N/a	—N/a	—N/a	—N/a	—N/a
Sudan & South Sudan	1,545	0.6%	1,045	0.5%	1,070	0.6%	760	0.5%	320	0.2%	35	0%	30	0%	20	0%	30	0%	—N/a	—N/a	—N/a	—N/a	—N/a	—N/a	—N/a	—N/a	—N/a	—N/a
Kenya & Tanzania & Uganda	1,500 (Note: Kenya: 860 / Tanzania: 245 / Uganda: 395)	0.6%	1,475 (Note: Kenya: 935 / Tanzania: 150 / Uganda: 390)	0.6%	1,050 (Note: Kenya: 580 / Tanzania: 210 / Uganda: 260)	0.6%	590 (Note: Kenya: 365 / Tanzania: 60 / Uganda: 165)	0.4%	625 (Note: Kenya: 335 / Tanzania: 110 / Uganda: 180)	0.5%	590 (Note: Kenya: 235 / Tanzania: 85 / Uganda: 270)	0.4%	505 (Note: Kenya: 210 / Tanzania: 100 / Uganda: 195)	0.4%	490 (Note: Kenya: 150 / Tanzania: 70 / Uganda: 270)	0.3%	535	0.4%	—N/a	—N/a	—N/a	—N/a	—N/a	—N/a	—N/a	—N/a	—N/a	—N/a
Egypt	1,320	0.5%	975	0.4%	570	0.3%	290	0.2%	230	0.2%	120	0.1%	185	0.1%	150	0.1%	160	0.1%	—N/a	—N/a	—N/a	—N/a	—N/a	—N/a	—N/a	—N/a	—N/a	—N/a
Bangladesh	1,295	0.5%	880	0.4%	385	0.2%	130	0.1%	125	0.1%	180	0.1%	95	0.1%	130	0.1%	20	0%	—N/a	—N/a	—N/a	—N/a	—N/a	—N/a	—N/a	—N/a	—N/a	—N/a
Iraq	1,295	0.5%	860	0.4%	655	0.4%	490	0.3%	315	0.2%	150	0.1%	145	0.1%	15	0%	—N/a	—N/a	—N/a	—N/a	—N/a	—N/a	—N/a	—N/a	—N/a	—N/a	—N/a	—N/a
France & Belgium	1,280 (Note: France: 975 / Belgium: 305)	0.5%	1,155 (Note: France: 795 / Belgium: 360)	0.5%	1,180 (Note: France: 820 / Belgium: 360)	0.6%	1,225 (Note: France: 735 / Belgium: 490)	0.8%	1,185 (Note: France: 725 / Belgium: 460)	0.9%	1,510 (Note: France: 840 / Belgium: 670)	1.1%	1,590 (Note: France: 855 / Belgium: 735)	1.1%	1,975 (Note: France: 1,020 / Belgium: 955)	1.4%	2,430 (Note: France: 1,320 / Belgium: 1,110)	1.7%	3,240	2.1%	3,950	2.3%	4,011	2.4%	4,493	2.3%	5,613	2.4%
Hong Kong	1,255	0.5%	1,455	0.6%	1,510	0.8%	1,470	1%	1,585	1.2%	1,825	1.3%	1,975	1.4%	1,860	1.3%	1,180	0.8%	—N/a	—N/a	—N/a	—N/a	—N/a	—N/a	—N/a	—N/a	—N/a	—N/a
Laos & Cambodia	1,200 (Note: Laos: 885 / Cambodia: 315)	0.5%	1,240 (Note: Laos: 930 / Cambodia: 310)	0.5%	1,240 (Note: Laos: 805 / Cambodia: 435)	0.7%	1,310 (Note: Laos: 975 / Cambodia: 335)	0.9%	1,440 (Note: Laos: 1,015 / Cambodia: 425)	1.1%	1,390 (Note: Laos: 1,105 / Cambodia: 285)	1%	1,555 (Note: Laos: 1,095 / Cambodia: 460)	1.1%	1,710 (Note: Laos: 1,295 / Cambodia: 415)	1.2%	985	0.7%	—N/a	—N/a	—N/a	—N/a	—N/a	—N/a	—N/a	—N/a	—N/a	—N/a
Guyana	1,190	0.5%	1,135	0.5%	1,095	0.6%	1,465	1%	1,130	0.8%	1,120	0.8%	1,265	0.9%	1,090	0.8%	815	0.6%	—N/a	—N/a	—N/a	—N/a	—N/a	—N/a	—N/a	—N/a	—N/a	—N/a
South Africa	1,180	0.5%	975	0.4%	940	0.5%	1,095	0.7%	605	0.5%	390	0.3%	510	0.4%	405	0.3%	370	0.3%	—N/a	—N/a	145	0.1%	96	0.1%	126	0.1%	165	0.1%
Colombia	1,145	0.4%	1,050	0.5%	1,090	0.6%	490	0.3%	195	0.1%	75	0.1%	45	0%	40	0%	—N/a	—N/a	—N/a	—N/a	—N/a	—N/a	—N/a	—N/a	—N/a	—N/a	—N/a	—N/a
Sri Lanka	1,125	0.4%	1,020	0.4%	755	0.4%	400	0.3%	485	0.4%	485	0.4%	430	0.3%	220	0.2%	85	0.1%	—N/a	—N/a	—N/a	—N/a	—N/a	—N/a	—N/a	—N/a	—N/a	—N/a
Iran	1,105	0.4%	1,180	0.5%	885	0.5%	940	0.6%	505	0.4%	500	0.4%	520	0.4%	145	0.1%	80	0.1%	—N/a	—N/a	—N/a	—N/a	—N/a	—N/a	—N/a	—N/a	—N/a	—N/a
Somalia	880	0.3%	760	0.3%	470	0.3%	345	0.2%	145	0.1%	130	0.1%	25	0%	5	0%	—N/a	—N/a	—N/a	—N/a	—N/a	—N/a	—N/a	—N/a	—N/a	—N/a	—N/a	—N/a
Afghanistan	840	0.3%	615	0.3%	700	0.4%	730	0.5%	210	0.2%	135	0.1%	105	0.1%	55	0%	—N/a	—N/a	—N/a	—N/a	—N/a	—N/a	—N/a	—N/a	—N/a	—N/a	—N/a	—N/a
Chile	820	0.3%	800	0.4%	790	0.4%	930	0.6%	965	0.7%	815	0.6%	965	0.7%	795	0.6%	1,415	1%	—N/a	—N/a	—N/a	—N/a	—N/a	—N/a	—N/a	—N/a	—N/a	—N/a
Argentina	795	0.3%	710	0.3%	755	0.4%	720	0.5%	265	0.2%	140	0.1%	185	0.1%	190	0.1%	250	0.2%	—N/a	—N/a	—N/a	—N/a	—N/a	—N/a	—N/a	—N/a	—N/a	—N/a
Greece	770	0.3%	820	0.4%	670	0.4%	905	0.6%	915	0.7%	850	0.6%	1,170	0.8%	1,100	0.8%	1,280	0.9%	1,200	0.8%	610	0.4%	158	0.1%	137	0.1%	135	0.1%
Ireland	750	0.3%	645	0.3%	555	0.3%	650	0.4%	750	0.6%	810	0.6%	705	0.5%	685	0.5%	560	0.4%	1,820	1.2%	5,368	3.2%	6,382	3.8%	8,284	4.3%	10,765	4.6%
Malaysia & Singapore	725 (Note: Malaysia: 545 / Singapore: 180)	0.3%	480 (Note: Malaysia: 375 / Singapore: 105)	0.2%	385 (Note: Malaysia: 320 / Singapore: 65)	0.2%	405 (Note: Malaysia: 305 / Singapore: 100)	0.3%	310 (Note: Malaysia: 230 / Singapore: 80)	0.2%	395 (Note: Malaysia: 315 / Singapore: 80)	0.3%	430 (Note: Malaysia: 355 / Singapore: 75)	0.3%	415 (Note: Malaysia: 310 / Singapore: 105)	0.3%	—N/a	—N/a	—N/a	—N/a	—N/a	—N/a	—N/a	—N/a	—N/a	—N/a	—N/a	—N/a
Australia & New Zealand	660	0.3%	500	0.2%	610	0.3%	380	0.3%	515	0.4%	445	0.3%	530	0.4%	710	0.5%	540	0.4%	575	0.4%	307	0.2%	239	0.1%	201	0.1%	250	0.1%
Czech Republic & Slovakia	645	0.3%	880	0.4%	740	0.4%	1,085	0.7%	1,225	0.9%	1,240	0.9%	1,495	1.1%	1,940	1.4%	1,610	1.1%	1,925	1.3%	1,514	0.9%	1,390	0.8%	1,537	0.8%	1,314	0.6%
Scandinavia (Note: Includes Denmark, Finland, Iceland, Norway and Sweden.)	630	0.2%	695	0.3%	585	0.3%	985	0.7%	855	0.6%	1,190	0.9%	1,610	1.2%	1,695	1.2%	2,295	1.6%	4,090	2.7%	5,797	3.4%	6,847	4.1%	9,279	4.8%	12,535	5.3%
Hungary	625	0.2%	815	0.4%	770	0.4%	1,185	0.8%	1,215	0.9%	1,400	1%	1,665	1.2%	1,910	1.3%	1,810	1.2%	2,565	1.7%	3,107	1.8%	1,106	0.7%	1,448	0.7%	1,579	0.7%
Romania	615	0.2%	720	0.3%	770	0.4%	905	0.6%	915	0.7%	1,075	0.8%	1,065	0.8%	805	0.6%	815	0.6%	955	0.6%	1,358	0.8%	1,126	0.7%	2,246	1.2%	3,874	1.6%
Total immigrants	257,620	19.7%	227,465	18.3%	184,505	15.7%	151,230	13.3%	133,660	12.1%	135,940	12.4%	138,595	12.8%	142,225	13.6%	146,060	14.4%	151,250	15.3%	169,998	18.4%	168,354	21.7%	193,586	26.5%	236,589	33.8%
Total responses	1,307,190	97.4%	1,240,700	97.1%	1,174,345	97.2%	1,133,515	98.7%	1,103,700	98.6%	1,100,290	98.8%	1,079,395	98.9%	1,049,320	98.7%	1,013,700	98.8%	988,245	100%	921,686	100%	776,541	100%	729,744	100%	700,139	100%
Total population	1,342,153	100%	1,278,365	100%	1,208,268	100%	1,148,401	100%	1,119,583	100%	1,113,898	100%	1,091,942	100%	1,063,016	100%	1,026,241	100%	988,247	100%	921,686	100%	776,541	100%	729,744	100%	700,139	100%

=== Recent immigration ===
The 2021 Canadian census counted a total of 58,370 people who immigrated to Manitoba between 2016 and 2021.

Recent immigrants to Manitoba by country of birth (2016 to 2021)
Country of birth	Population	% recent immigrants
India	13,335	22.8%
Philippines	11,705	20.1%
Nigeria	5,105	8.7%
China	3,585	6.1%
Syria	1,575	2.7%
Eritrea	1,445	2.5%
Brazil	1,440	2.5%
Ukraine	1,305	2.2%
Pakistan	1,210	2.1%
United States	1,035	1.8%
South Korea	865	1.5%
Ethiopia	680	1.2%
Mexico	660	1.1%
Iraq	655	1.1%
Russia	650	1.1%
Vietnam	585	1%
Bangladesh	580	1%
Germany	565	1%
Israel	510	0.9%
Democratic Republic of the Congo	450	0.8%
Jamaica	435	0.7%
United Kingdom	405	0.7%
Sudan	390	0.7%
Somalia	380	0.7%
Kazakhstan	300	0.5%
Total recent immigrants	58,370	100%

=== Interprovincial migration ===
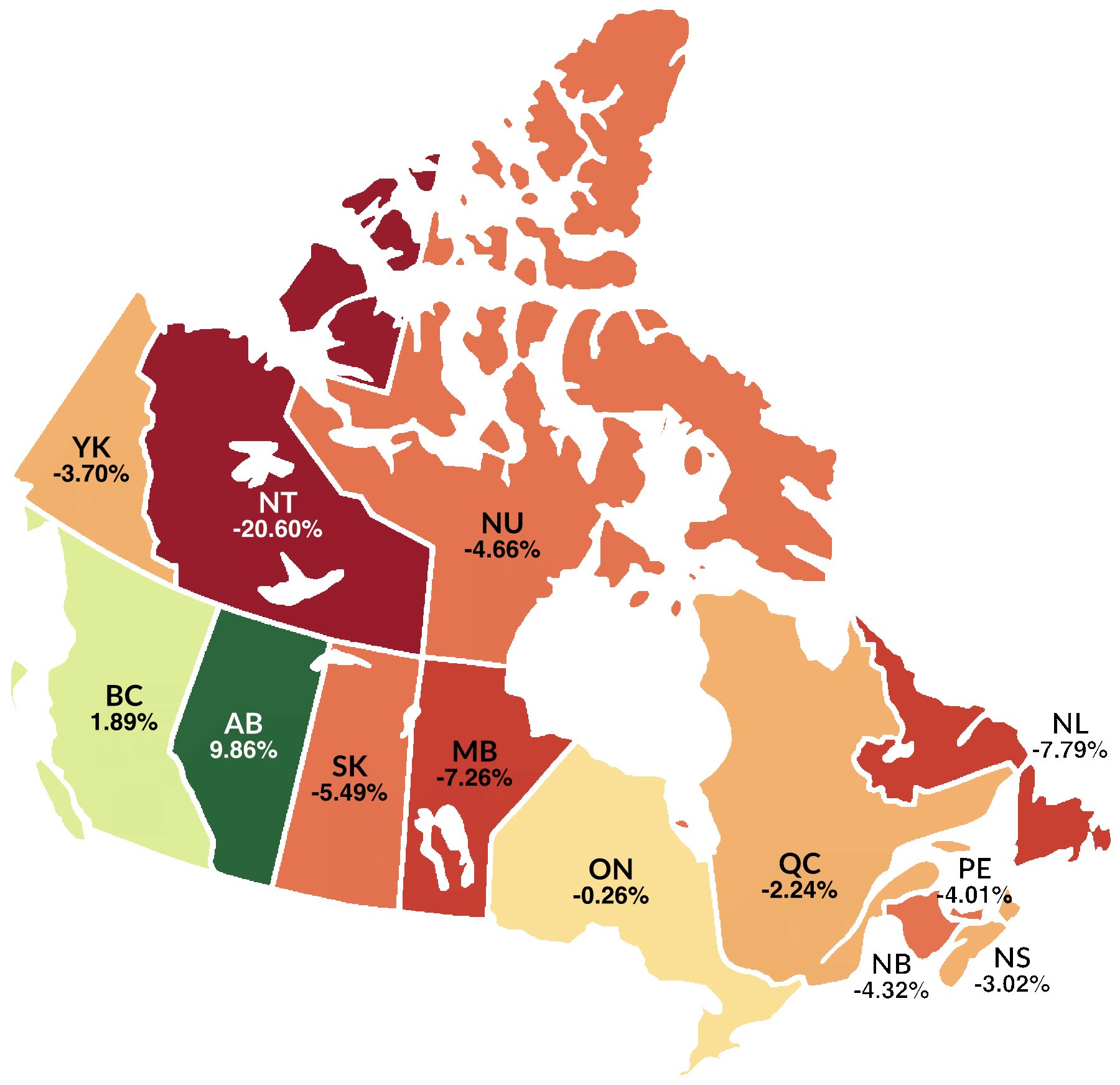
Net cumulative interprovincial migration per Province from 1997 to 2017, as a share of population of each Provinces

Manitoba is one of the provinces most affected by Interprovincial migration, having had a negative mobility ratio for 42 out of 46 years from 1971 to 2017. This is the second-worst record for years of negative interprovincial migration, followed only by Quebec.

Interprovincial migration in Manitoba
	In-migrants	Out-migrants	Net migration
2008–09	11,916	15,027	−3,111
2009–10	11,786	14,198	−2,412
2010–11	11,085	14,602	−3,517
2011–12	11,443	15,655	−4,212
2012–13	9,988	14,994	−5,006
2013–14	9,452	16,303	−6,851
2014–15	10,022	16,700	−6,678
2015–16	10,994	15,875	−4,881
2016–17	10,350	15,474	−5,124
2017–18	9,578	16,726	−7,148
2018–19	10,351	19,597	−9,246

Source: Statistics Canada

== See also ==
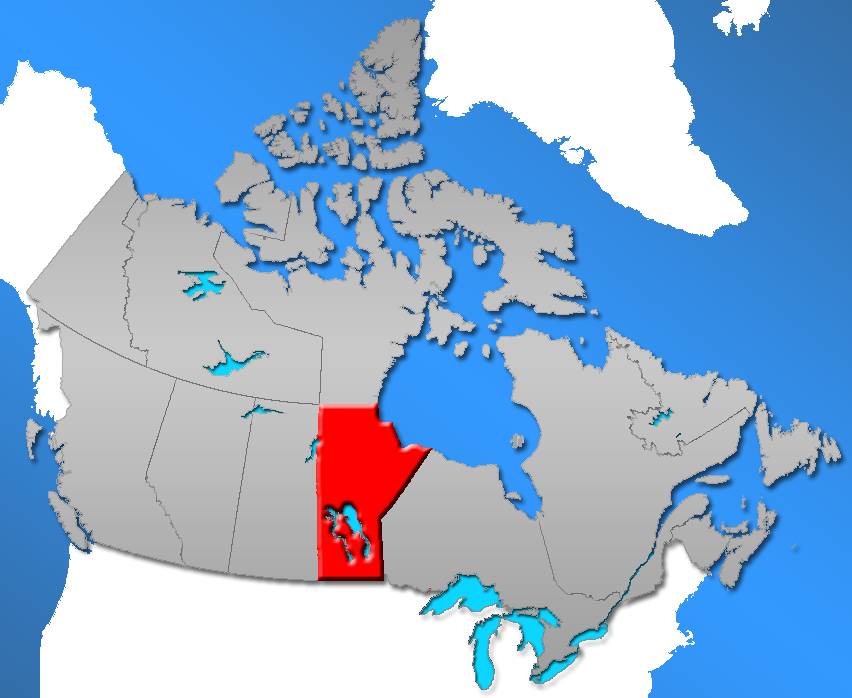
Demographics of Canada's provinces and territories
- Demographics of Canada
- Population of Canada by province and territory
- Franco-Manitoban
