= List of airlines of Manitoba =

This is a list of airlines of Manitoba which have an air operator's certificate issued by Transport Canada, the country's civil aviation authority. These are airlines that are based in Manitoba.

== Current airlines ==
Airline	Image	IATA	ICAO	Callsign	Hub airport(s) or headquarters	Notes
Calm Air		MO	CAV	CALM AIR	Thompson	Scheduled passenger service, charters, cargo
Fast Air			PRB	POLAR BEAR	Winnipeg	Air ambulance services, charter, helicopters
Harv's Air Service					Steinbach (South)	Charters, flight training, air taxi
Keystone Air Service			KEE	KEYSTONE	Winnipeg/St. Andrews	Charters
Kivalliq Air		FK			Winnipeg James Armstrong Richardson	Scheduled passenger service
Missinippi Airways		MA		Missinippi	The Pas/Grace Lake	Charters, MEDIVAC (air ambulance), and scheduled services. Bases at Thompson, Norway House, Pukatawagan and Winnipeg.
Perimeter Aviation		4B	PAG	PERIMETER	Winnipeg James Armstrong Richardson	Scheduled passenger service, charters, MEDIVAC (air ambulance), flight training
SkyNorth Air					Winnipeg James Armstrong Richardson	Scheduled passenger service, charters

== Defunct airlines ==
Airline	Image	IATA	ICAO	Callsign	Hub airport(s) or headquarters	Notes
Air Manitoba		7N	NAM	MANITOBA		Established as Ilford Airways in 1953, merged with Riverton Airways in 1960 to then form Ilford Riverton Airways in 1963. Merged with Northland Air in 1986 to form Northland Air Manitoba. Renamed Air Manitoba before AOC revoked in 1994 over safety concerns. Existed as a leasing compony around 1997
Air Manitoba Leasing						1997?
Canadian Airways					Winnipeg James Armstrong Richardson	1926 - 1941; Established as Western Canadian Airways, purchased by Canadian Pacific Airlines
First Nations Transportation					Gimli	2003 - 2009
Greyhound Air					Winnipeg James Armstrong Richardson	1996 - 1997
Ilford Riverton Airways						Merged into Northland Air
Lamb Air					The Pas	1934 - 1981
Northland Air Manitoba						Renamed to Air Manitoba
Transair		TZ	TTZ		Winnipeg James Armstrong Richardson	1947 - 1979; Started as Central Northern Airways, renamed Transair in 1956; sold to Pacific Western Airlines in 1979
Winnport					Winnipeg James Armstrong Richardson	1998 - 2002; Winnipeg-based air cargo company flying to China; renamed to Cargojet Airways
