= Climate of Manitoba =

Köppen climate types of Manitoba

Because of its location in the centre of the North American continent, the climate of Manitoba is extreme. In general, temperatures and precipitation decrease from south to north, and precipitation also decreases from east to west. Since Manitoba is far removed from the moderating influences of both mountain ranges and large bodies of water, and because of the generally flat landscape in many areas, it is exposed to numerous weather systems throughout the year, including cold Arctic high-pressure air masses that settle in from the northwest, usually during the months of January and February. In the summer, the air masses often come out of the southern United States, as the stronger Azores High ridges into the North American continent, the more warm, humid air is drawn northward from the Gulf of Mexico, generally during the months of July or August.

== General climate ==
Manitoba is a sunny province; according to Environment Canada, Manitoba ranked first for clearest skies year round. Southern Manitoba has a fairly long frost-free season, consisting of between 120 and 140 days in the Red River Valley. It is also prone to high humidity in the summer months with the extreme of 53.0 °C (127.4 °F) in Carman, which set the highest humidex recorded in Canada. There are three main climatic regions.

The northern sections of the province (including the city of Thompson) fall in the subarctic climate zone (Köppen Dfc). This region features long and extremely cold winters and brief, warm summers with little precipitation. Overnight lows as low as −40 °C (−40 °F) occur on several days each winter, and the temperature may remain below −18 °C (0 °F) for weeks.

Southern Manitoba (including Winnipeg), falls into the humid continental climate zone (Köppen Dfb). Temperatures here are similar to the semi-arid climate zone, but this region is the most humid area in the Prairie Provinces with moderate precipitation.

Southwestern Manitoba, though under the same climate classification as the rest of Southern Manitoba, is closer to the semi-arid interior of Palliser's Triangle, and as such, is drier and more prone to droughts than other parts of southern Manitoba. This area is cold and windy in the winter Summers are generally warm to hot, with low to moderate humidity.

The following table provides the 1971 to 2000 averages for high and low temperatures in July and January, rainfall, snowfall and precipitation for seven cities.

City	Region	July	January	Rain (mm)	Snow (cm)	Prec. (mm)
Winnipeg	Winnipeg	26/13 °C (79/55 °F)	−13/−20 °C (9/-4 °F)	416	111	514
Portage la Prairie	Central Plains	25/13 °C (77/55 °F)	−12/−23 °C (10/-9 °F)	389	125	514
Dauphin	Parkland	25/12 °C (77/54 °F)	−12/−23 °C (10/-9 °F)	395	129	508
Brandon	Westman	25/11 °C (77/52 °F)	−13/−24 °C (9/-11 °F)	373	112	472
The Pas	Northern	23/12 °C (73/54 °F)	−16/−26 °C (3/-15 °F)	324	155	443
Thompson	Northern	23/9 °C (73/48 °F)	−19/−31 °C (-2/-24 °F)	348	186	517
Churchill	Northern	17/7 °C (63/46 °F)	−23/−31 °C (-9/-24 °F)	264	191	431

== Tornadoes ==
Canada's first Fujita Scale F5 tornado approaching Elie

Southern parts of the province, located just north of Tornado Alley, experience tornadoes each year, with 15 confirmed touchdowns in 2006. June and July are the most common months for such tornadoes. In 2007, on June 22 and June 23, numerous tornadoes touched down, including an F5 Tornado that devastated parts of Elie (the strongest officially recorded tornado in Canada).
