= Norway House =

Population centre in Manitoba, Canada

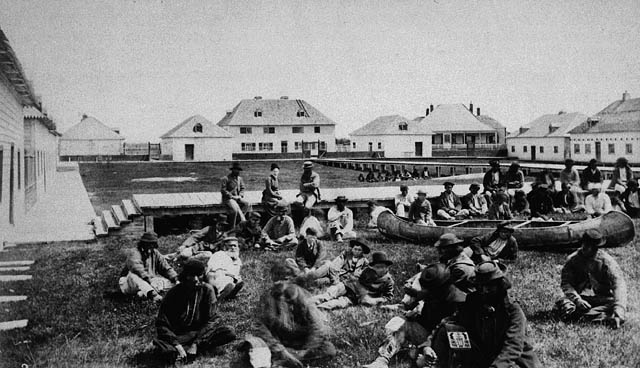
- Inside the fort at Norway House, NWT 1878

- Location within Manitoba
- Coordinates: 53°59′25″N 97°48′56″W
- Country: Canada
- Province: Manitoba
- Census division: 22
- Region: Northern Region
- Time zone: UTC−6 (CST)
  - Summer (DST): UTC−5 (CDT)
- Website: Norway House Cree Nation; Norway House

National Historic Site of Canada
- Official name: Norway House National Historic Site of Canada
- Designated: 1932

Norway House is a population centre of over 5,000 people, some 30 km (19 mi) north of Lake Winnipeg, on the eastern channel of the Nelson River, in the province of Manitoba, Canada. Norway House has three meanings: the unincorporated community; the First Nation reserve of the Norway House Cree Nation (Kinosao Sipi Cree Nation); and both together. Thus, Norway House has both a chief and a mayor.

The community is located 456 km (283 mi) by air north of Winnipeg, 208 km (129 mi) by air east of The Pas, and 190 km (120 mi) by air south of Thompson. To drive from Winnipeg, it is approximately 800 km (500 mi); from Thompson, it is about 300 km (190 mi). Major economic activities include commercial fishing, trapping, logging, and government services. Unemployment varies seasonally, with peaks as high as 70%.

Norway House was a major depot of the Hudson's Bay Company for most of the 19th century, and from the 1830s it was the seat of the Council of the Northern Department of Rupert's Land.

== History ==
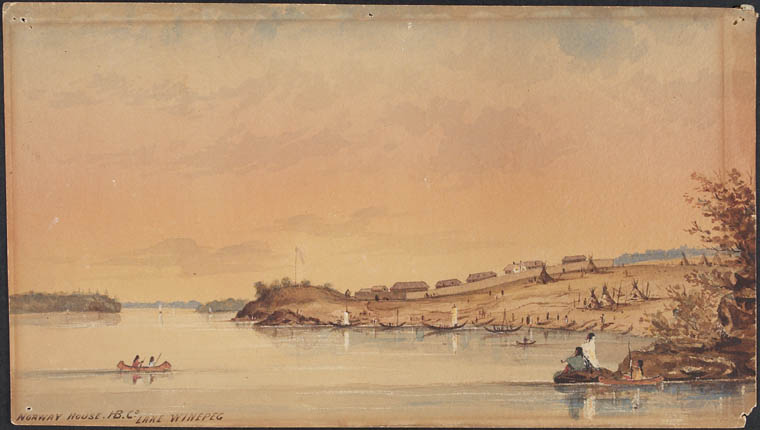
Norway House, c. 1847

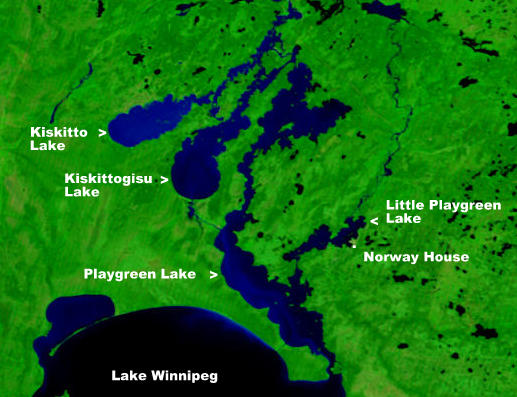
Norway House on Little Playgreen Lake

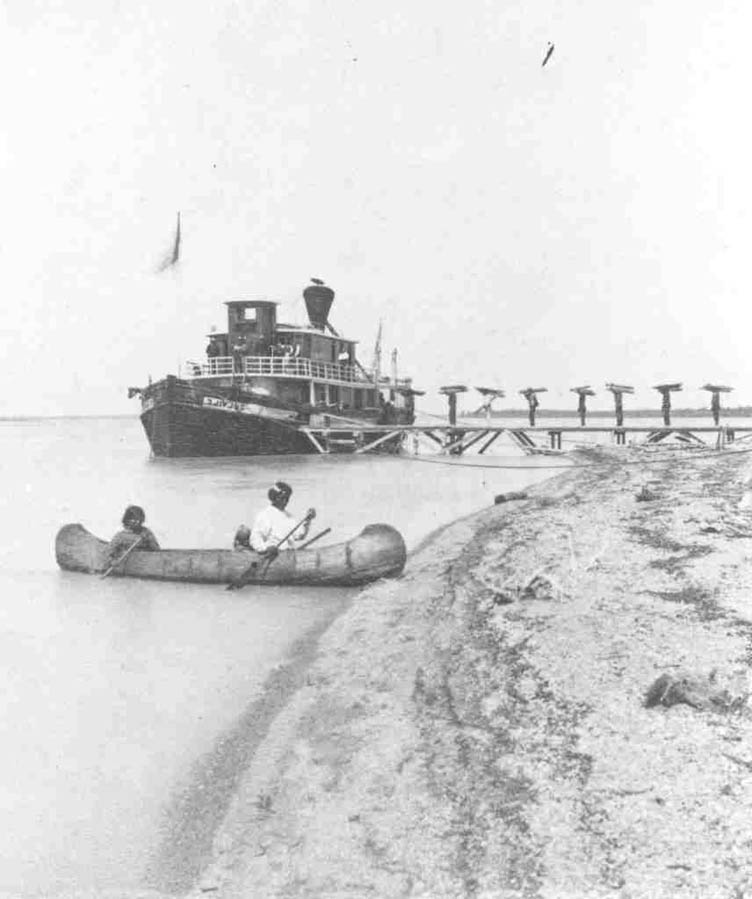
SS Colvile docked at Norway House (circa 1880)

After the arrival of Europeans in North America, the Hayes River became an important link in the development of Canada. The Hayes was the favoured route between York Factory and the interior of western Canada for explorers, fur traders and European settlers from 1670 to 1870, because transit was easier and food was more readily available. After Anthony Henday's explorations, Joseph Smith was sent in 1756, from York Factory, to explore the area. He ascended the Nelson River seeking Lake Winnipeg. He reached Little Playgreen Lake on September 21 that year.

In 1816, Lord Selkirk sent out a band of Norwegians, apparently ex-convicts, to build a road from York Factory to Lake Winnipeg and a series of supply posts. There are also reports that Norwegians were employed in 1814 and sent to nearby Playgreen Lake with a herd of reindeer to introduce reindeer herding for animal husbandry and pulling sleighs during the winter for the Hudson's Bay Company. They built Norway House at Mossy Point on the west side of the Nelson's outflow from Lake Winnipeg in 1817, replacing the former Jack River post at that location. In the last days of the rivalry between the Hudson's Bay Company and the North West Company, prior to their union in 1821, Colin Robertson, of the Hudson's Bay Company from their office in Montreal, organized a brigade of mostly French-Canadians led by John Clarke, bound for the Athabasca country to compete with the North West Company by developing the trade of supplying the colonists in addition to the company's usual business of trading furs.

In 1822, Governor Simpson passed through Norway House in the depth of winter on his way to Cumberland House. Simpson traveled through Norway House to the Columbia District in 1824–25, journeying from York Factory. He investigated a quicker route than previously used, following the Saskatchewan River and crossing the mountains at Athabasca Pass. This route, which passed through Norway House, was thereafter followed by the York Factory Express brigades.

In 1825 or 1826, much of the post was destroyed by fire. In 1826, the company abandoned its position on Mossy Point in favour of its present position on the East River, now known as the Jack River, in order to be nearer to the fishery, the food supply of its population.

In 1830, Cumberland House, formerly the most important post in the interior, was supplanted by Norway House. From the 1830s, the Councils of the Hudson's Bay Company (annual meetings of its chief factors) met at Norway House rather than York Factory. These meetings would involve planning decisions for the following year and promotions from clerk to Chief Trader and from Chief Trader to Chief Factor. Such promotions were within the authority of the Governor and Committee. The recommendations of the council would be given to Governor Simpson who would make his recommendations to London. The last of the great Northern Council meetings that were started by Simpson a half century earlier was convened at Norway House by Donald Smith in July 1870. The men met around a great oak table with Smith as the new Governor, following his success in negotiations earlier that year concerning the Red River Rebellion on behalf of Canada, and empowered him to represent them in London concerning the rights of the Chief Factors and Chief Traders to share in the £300,000 transfer fee payable upon the surrender of Rupert's Land.

The remnants of the former Hudson’s Bay Company fort established in 1825—the company's principal inland depot for the fur trade and the site where Treaty 5 was signed in 1875—was designated a National Historic Sites of Canada in 1932. Surviving buildings include the Archway Warehouse (1839–1841), the Gaol (1855–1856) and the Powder Magazine (1837–1838).

== Demographics ==
In the 2021 Census of Population conducted by Statistics Canada, Norway House had a population of 363 living in 134 of its 190 total private dwellings, a change of −24.1% from its 2016 population of 478. With a land area of 114.53 km^{2} (44.22 sq mi), it had a population density of 3.2/km^{2} (8.2/sq mi) in 2021.

Norway House 17 had a population of 5,390 in 2021 an increase of 12.1% since 2016. The community included 2,239 private dwellings on a land area of 72.99 square km.

These two adjoining communities form a population centre of 5,753.

== Transportation ==
Provincial Road (PR) 373, an all-weather road, leads from Norway House past PR 374 which leads to Cross Lake, through Jenpeg and then joins Provincial Trunk Highway 6.

There is a ferry that shuttles vehicles across the Nelson Channel just north of Norway House. This ferry runs most of the year, except into the winter months when an ice bridge is opened. The ferry is known to get stuck occasionally in the freeze-up season and cause delays.

The most important means of transportation in this remote territory is the airplane. Manitoba Northern Airports maintains Norway House Airport with a 1,189-metre (3,901 ft) crushed-rock airstrip. There are daily flights to Winnipeg with Perimeter Aviation.

== Services ==
Norway House has several restaurants, two hotels, a Royal Bank branch, two Northern stores, two Tim Horton locations and a KFC fast food restaurant, a full service post office, two video stores and paved roads within the community.

Norway House is served by the Royal Canadian Mounted Police and the NHCN Safety Officers.

== Education ==
The Helen Betty Osborne Ininiw Education Resource Centre is a kindergarten to Grade 12 school with a preschool program as well. It was preceded by the Rossville residential school. It is one of the most technologically advanced schools in the province and one of the biggest schools of the Frontier School Division.

Norway House is home to a regional centre of the University College of the North and has satellite degree programming from Brandon University's Faculty of Education and the University of Manitoba.

== Climate ==
Norway House has a subarctic climate (Dfc) bordering a warm summer continental climate (Dfb). As is typical in Manitoba, precipitation is mainly in summers, with winters being cold and dry. Norway House recorded Manitoba's coldest temperature on January 9, 1899, when the temperature reached -52.8°C (-63°F).

Climate data for Norway House (1981–2010 normals & extremes until 2010)
Month	Jan	Feb	Mar	Apr	May	Jun	Jul	Aug	Sep	Oct	Nov	Dec	Year
Record high °C (°F)	7.7 (45.9)	9.0 (48.2)	14.0 (57.2)	25.9 (78.6)	33.0 (91.4)	33.8 (92.8)	34.7 (94.5)	32.2 (90.0)	31.1 (88.0)	22.9 (73.2)	12.8 (55.0)	5.4 (41.7)	34.7 (94.5)
Mean daily maximum °C (°F)	−16.1 (3.0)	−11.4 (11.5)	−3.8 (25.2)	5.9 (42.6)	14.1 (57.4)	20.1 (68.2)	23.3 (73.9)	22.0 (71.6)	14.8 (58.6)	6.0 (42.8)	−4.7 (23.5)	−13.2 (8.2)	4.7 (40.5)
Daily mean °C (°F)	−21.5 (−6.7)	−17.6 (0.3)	−10.3 (13.5)	−0.2 (31.6)	7.9 (46.2)	14.1 (57.4)	17.6 (63.7)	16.5 (61.7)	9.7 (49.5)	2.0 (35.6)	−8.8 (16.2)	−18.2 (−0.8)	−0.7 (30.7)
Mean daily minimum °C (°F)	−26.9 (−16.4)	−23.7 (−10.7)	−16.9 (1.6)	−6.2 (20.8)	1.7 (35.1)	8.1 (46.6)	11.9 (53.4)	10.9 (51.6)	4.7 (40.5)	−2.1 (28.2)	−12.9 (8.8)	−23.2 (−9.8)	−6.2 (20.8)
Record low °C (°F)	−52.8 (−63.0)	−45.6 (−50.1)	−41.5 (−42.7)	−32.7 (−26.9)	−12.0 (10.4)	−2.0 (28.4)	1.8 (35.2)	−1.4 (29.5)	−7.0 (19.4)	−22.8 (−9.0)	−35.9 (−32.6)	−45.0 (−49.0)	−52.8 (−63.0)
Average precipitation mm (inches)	17.6 (0.69)	16.7 (0.66)	20.3 (0.80)	20.9 (0.82)	41 (1.6)	63.8 (2.51)	77.5 (3.05)	73.3 (2.89)	51.5 (2.03)	39.5 (1.56)	25 (1.0)	22.9 (0.90)	469.9 (18.50)
Average snowfall cm (inches)	26.5 (10.4)	28.7 (11.3)	26.5 (10.4)	17.8 (7.0)	5.9 (2.3)	0.1 (0.0)	0.0 (0.0)	0.0 (0.0)	1.5 (0.6)	21.4 (8.4)	33.1 (13.0)	33.6 (13.2)	195.1 (76.6)
Average precipitation days	14.5	12.2	10.9	8.1	11.0	12.0	13.4	12.8	12.6	13.3	14.5	14.2	149.5
Source: Environment Canada

== Treaty and York Boat Days ==
The Treaty and York Boat Days are annually each summer from the beginning of August for a week; the York Boat events serve as the main attraction. These are team boat races with participants aged 8–18. This event is to honor the traditions of the ancestors who once used York Boats as a means of transportation. Treaty and York Boat Days has a variety of hosts each year who set up food booths for the community to come together, often these booths prepare meals that are homemade.

== See also ==
- York Factory Express
- Voyageurs
- North American fur trade
- Norwegian Canadians
