= Cross Lake (Charlie Sinclair Memorial) Airport =

Airport in Manitoba, Canada

- IATA: YCR; ICAO: CYCR

Summary
- Airport type: Public
- Operator: Government of Manitoba
- Location: Cross Lake, Manitoba, Canada
- Time zone: CST (UTC−06:00)
  - Summer (DST): CDT (UTC−05:00)
- Elevation AMSL: 706 ft (215 m)
- Coordinates: 54°36′39″N 097°45′37″W

Map
- Location in Manitoba CYCR (Canada)

Runways
Direction	Length		Surface
Direction	ft	m	Surface
05/23	3,993	1,217	Crushed rock

Statistics (2010)
- Aircraft movements: 1,794
- Source: Canada Flight Supplement; Movements from Statistics Canada

Cross Lake (Charlie Sinclair Memorial) Airport (IATA: YCR, ICAO: CYCR) is located 1 nautical mile (1.9 km; 1.2 mi) east of Cross Lake, Manitoba, Canada.

== Airlines and destinations ==
Airlines	Destinations
Perimeter Aviation	Norway House, Winnipeg

== See also ==
- List of airports in Manitoba
