= Norway House Airport =

Airport in Manitoba, Canada

- IATA: YNE; ICAO: CYNE; WMO: 71141

Summary
- Airport type: Public
- Operator: Government of Manitoba
- Location: Norway House, Manitoba
- Time zone: CST (UTC−06:00)
  - Summer (DST): CDT (UTC−05:00)
- Elevation AMSL: 734 ft / 224 m
- Coordinates: 53°57′30″N 097°50′39″W

Map
- Location in Manitoba CYNE (Canada)

Runways
Direction	Length		Surface
Direction	ft	m	Surface
06/24	3,903	1,190	Crushed rock

Statistics (2010)
- Aircraft movements: 4,408
- Source: Canada Flight Supplement; Environment Canada; Movements from Statistics Canada

Norway House Airport (IATA: YNE, ICAO: CYNE) is located adjacent to Norway House, Manitoba, Canada.

== Airlines and destinations ==
Airlines	Destinations
Perimeter Aviation	Cross Lake, Winnipeg

== See also ==
- List of airports in Manitoba
- Norway House Water Aerodrome
