= Nabisipi River =

Nabisipi River Rivière Nabisipi
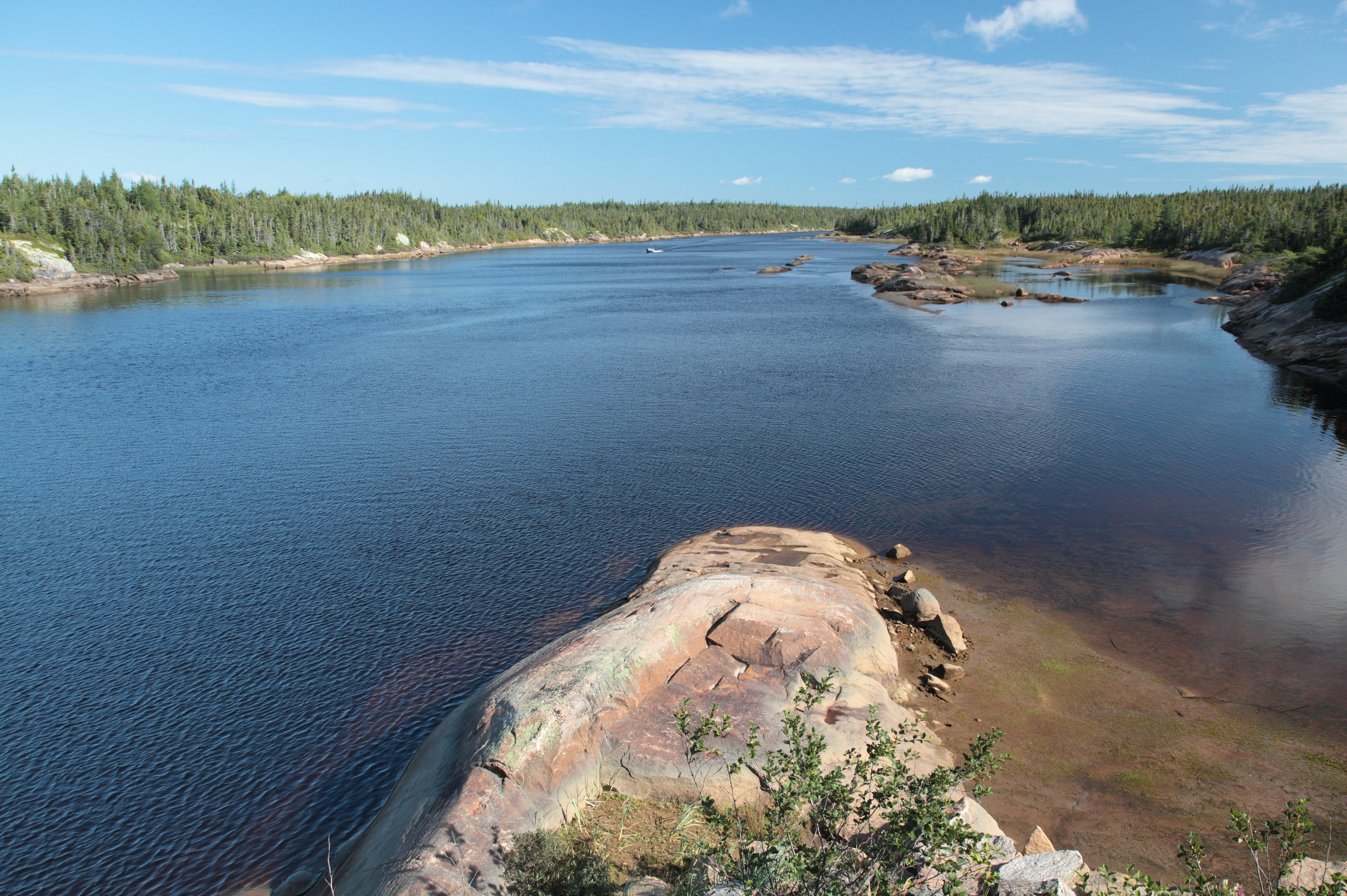
- The river from Quebec Route 138

- Location within Quebec

Location
- Country: Canada
- Province: Quebec
- Region: Côte-Nord
- RCM: Minganie

Physical characteristics
- Mouth: Gulf of Saint Lawrence
  - coordinates: 50.233064°N 62.219446°W
- Length: 158 kilometres (98 mi)
- Basin size: 2,086 square kilometres (805 sq mi)

The Nabisipi River (French: Rivière Nabisipi) is a salmon river in the Côte-Nord region of Quebec, Canada. It flows into the Gulf of Saint Lawrence

== Location ==
The Nabisipi River rises in Lake Saumur. It flows for 158 kilometres (98 mi) to the Gulf of Saint Lawrence west of Aguanish. The river drains an area of 2,086 square kilometres (805 sq mi). It lies between the basins of the Pashashibou River to the west and the Aguanish River to the east. It crosses the Canadian Shield, and has many rapids. At first it flows through the unorganized territory of Lac-Jérôme. The mouth of the river is in the municipality of Aguanish in the Minganie Regional County Municipality. The name in the Innu language means "man's river".

== Description ==
The Dictionnaire des rivières et lacs de la province de Québec (1914) says,

Situated on the north coast of the Gulf of Saint Lawrence, Saguenay County, at the end of the seigneury of Mingan and several miles from the river Agouanus or Goynish. The watercourse which is frequented by salmon and trout is interrupted by several falls during the first thirty miles. One of them has a height of 55 feet. The forest is composed of pine, fir and birch, but is quite poor quality. As for the surrounding land, it is completely unsuitable for agriculture. NABESIPI is a Montagnais word meaning "Man River".

== Fishing ==
The river has always been fished by the aboriginal people. Huard (1897: 349) wrote of the Nabisipi River, "It was about 1855 that the Rochette families settled there, after the Hudson's Bay Company had abandoned the salmon fishing station it had on the little Nabisipi River ... in the latter years [before 1897] the whole of the Nabisippians embarked to seek fortune under a more favorable sky." In the 1960s there was a research station on its banks. There is an old fish ladder that the salmon still use. The Nabisipi Outfitter, co-managed by the Innu, protects the resource, and encourages catch and release of all salmon.

Atlantic salmon typically do not return to the river until July. The last 40 kilometres (25 mi) of the river has five pits that can be used for sport fishing by boat or wading. The average catch weighs 3–5 kilograms (6.6–11.0 lb). As of 2019 the Nabisipi UenapeuHipu outfitters, based at the mouth of the river, arranged for salmon fishing trips with guides and a cook.

In May 2015 the Ministry of Forests, Wildlife and Parks of Quebec announced a sport fishing catch-and-release program for large salmon on sixteen of Quebec's 118 salmon rivers. These were the Mitis, Laval, Pigou, Bouleau, Aux Rochers, Jupitagon, Magpie, Saint-Jean, Corneille, Piashti, Watshishou, Little Watshishou, Nabisipi, Aguanish and Natashquan rivers. The Quebec Atlantic Salmon Federation said that the measures did not go nearly far enough in protecting salmon for future generations. In view of the rapidly declining Atlantic salmon population catch-and-release should have been implemented on all rivers apart from northern Quebec.

== Sources ==
- Bourdon, Philippe; Ibrahim, Ghassen; Luce, Myriam; NantobBikatui, N’Binkéna; Othoniel, Clara; Tremblay, Yohann (April 2015), Portrait préliminaire de la zone de gestion intégrée de l’eau par bassin versant (PDF) (in French), OBV Duplessis, archived from the original (PDF) on 2019-09-02
- Dumont, Jean (June 1986), Prolongement de la route 138 entre Baie Johan-Beetz et la Rivière Pashashibou (PDF) (in French)
- La Pourvoirie Nabisipi en bref (in French), Nabisipi
- "Municipalité d'Aguanish", GrandQuebec.com
- Portrait préliminaire de la zone de gestion intégrée de l'eau par bassin versant Duplessis (PDF) (in French), OBV Duplessis, April 2015, archived from the original (PDF) on 2019-09-02
- Quebec salmon need stronger preservation rules, association says, Montreal: CBC News, 10 May 2015
- Rivière Nabisipi, Natural Resources Canada
- "Rivière Nabisipi", Saumon Québec (in French)
- Rouillard, Eugène (1914), "Nabesipi, (Rivière)", Dictionnaire des rivières et lacs de la province de Québec (in French), Québec. Département des terres et forêts
