= Pigou River =

- Location within Quebec
- Native name: Rivière Pigou (French)

Physical characteristics
- Source
  - location: Petit lac Travers
  - coordinates: 50.542222°N 65.679722°W
  - elevation: 480 metres (1,570 ft)
- Mouth: Gulf of Saint Lawrence
  - coordinates: 50.268511°N 65.621145°W
  - elevation: 0 metres (0 ft)
- Length: 35 kilometres (22 mi)
- Basin size: 169 square kilometres (65 sq mi)

The Pigou River (French: Rivière Pigou) is a salmon river in the Côte-Nord region of Quebec, Canada. It empties into the Gulf of Saint Lawrence.

== Location ==
The Pigou rises on the Laurentian Plateau and empties into the Gulf of Saint Lawrence about 60 kilometres (37 mi) east of Sept-Îles. The river rises in Petit lac Travers at an elevation of 480 metres (1,570 ft). It is about 35 kilometres (22 mi) long. The river flows south through the unorganized territory of Rivière-Nipissis. The East Pigou River, a small tributary, enters about 6 kilometres (3.7 mi) from its mouth. The mouth of the Pigou River is in the municipality of Sept-Îles, Sept-Rivières.

== Name ==
The name "Pigou" may come from the Algonquin language pikiou meaning "gum", referring to a place where resin is extracted from fir or pine, or from the Innu language pikiou meaning "fish". The name is also used for nearby islands and a fishing bank. Another theory, less likely, is that "pigou" is an old navy term for a hanging candle holder. The Pigou River is first mentioned by name in 1892 by the surveyor C. C. Duberger who wrote that "the Pigou River is small and does not appear to be long".

== Description ==
According to the Dictionnaire des rivières et lacs de la province de Québec (1914),

Situated on the north coast of the Gulf of Saint Lawerence, Saguenay County. This watercourse is well wooded with spruce and birch measuring from 12 to 20 inches in diameter, and transport of the wood to the sea is a simple thing. The surveyor C.C. Duberger (1892) wrote that the land on each side is fairly flat and consists of yellow earth. The small watercourse has many fish. According to the dictionary by Trévoux, the word "Pigou" is an old naval term. It is used for an iron chandelier that holds a candle.

== Basin ==
The river basin covers 169 square kilometres (65 sq mi). It lies between the basins of the Loups Marins River and the Bouleau River. It covers part of the unorganized territory of Rivière-Nipissis and part of the municipality of Sept-Îles. The bedrock is Precambrian, covered in typical boreal vegetation. A map of the ecological regions of Quebec shows the Pigou River in sub-regions 6j-T and 6m-T of the east spruce/moss subdomain.

== Salmon ==
Anadromous Atlantic salmon are blocked by a 9 metres (30 ft) waterfall 1.7 kilometres (1.1 mi) above the head of the tidal stretch. The gradient of the section of the river below the waterfall is 12.4 metres per kilometre (65 ft/mi). This section has large pools separated by short sections of rapids. The bed of the river is fine Champlain sediment in parts, bare rock in other parts. Between 1984 and 2017 there were only two reported catches of salmon in the river, both in 1998.

In May 2015 the Ministry of Forests, Wildlife and Parks of Quebec announced a sport fishing catch-and-release program for large salmon on sixteen of Quebec's 118 salmon rivers. These were the Mitis, Laval, Pigou, Bouleau, Aux Rochers, Jupitagon, Magpie, Saint-Jean, Corneille, Piashti, Watshishou, Little Watshishou, Nabisipi, Aguanish and Natashquan rivers. The Quebec Atlantic Salmon Federation said that the measures did not go nearly far enough in protecting salmon for future generations. In view of the rapidly declining Atlantic salmon population catch-and-release should have been implemented on all rivers apart from northern Quebec.

In 2017 all salmon, large and small, had to be released on the Malbaie (Gaspé Peninsula), Pigou, Bouleau, Magpie, Coacoachou, Nétagamiou, Little Mecatina and Véco rivers. Only young salmon could be retained on 51 rivers, and limited retention of large salmon was allowed on 19 rivers.

== Sources ==
- Bilan de l'exploitation du saumon au Québec en 2017 (PDF) (in French), ministère des Forêts, de la Faune et des Parcs, Secteur de la faune, 15 February 2018
- Bourdon, Philippe; Ibrahim, Ghassen; Luce, Myriam; NantobBikatui, N’Binkéna; Othoniel, Clara; Tremblay, Yohann (April 2015), Portrait préliminaire de la zone de gestion intégrée de l'eau par bassin versant (PDF) (in French), OBV Duplessis, archived from the original (PDF) on 2019-09-02
- Quebec salmon need stronger preservation rules, association says, Montreal: CBC News, 10 May 2015
- Randall, Robert G.; Power, Geoffrey (June 1979), "Atlantic salmon (Salmo salar) of the Pigou and Bouleau Rivers, Quebec", Environmental Biology of Fishes, 4 (2): 179–184, doi:10.1007/BF00005451, S2CID 32496235
- Rivière Pigou (in French), Commission de toponymie du Québec
- Rivière Pigou, Natural Resources Canada
- Rouillard, Eugène (1914), "Pigou, (Rivière)", Dictionnaire des rivières et lacs de la province de Québec (in French), Québec. Département des terres et forêts
- Saucier, J.-P.; Robitaille, A.; Grondin, P.; Bergeron, J.-F.; Gosselin, J. (2011), Les régions écologiques du Québec méridional (PDF) (map), 4 (in French), Ministère des Ressources naturelles et de la Faune, archived from the original (PDF) on 2020-06-19
