= Aguanish River =

Aguanish River Aguanus River
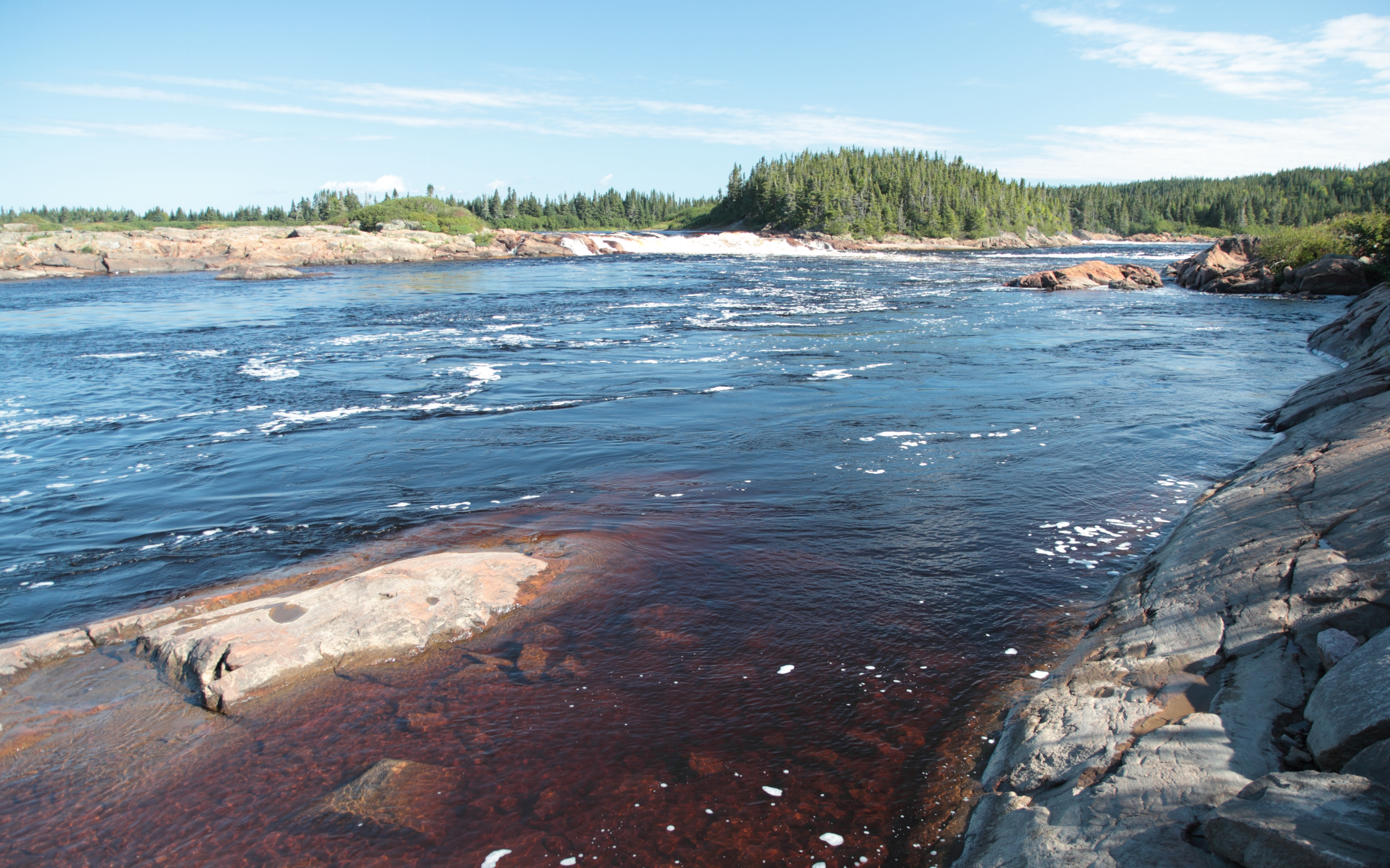
- Upstream from Route 138

- Location within Quebec

Location
- Country: Canada
- Province: Quebec
- Region: Côte-Nord
- RCM: Minganie

Physical characteristics
- Mouth: Gulf of Saint Lawrence
  - coordinates: 50.2180556°N 62.0861111°W
  - elevation: 0 metres (0 ft)
- Length: 280 kilometres (170 mi)
- Basin size: 5,777 square kilometres (2,231 sq mi)

The Aguanish River, Aguanus River official name until 1985, (French: Rivière Aguanish), is a salmon river that flows from north to south, emptying into the Jacques Cartier Strait, the Gulf of St. Lawrence and Aguanish municipality, in Minganie RCM, Côte-Nord region, Quebec, Canada.

== Geography ==
The Aguanish salmon river is more than 280 kilometres (170 mi) long. It is known for The Trait de Scie (Saw Cut), a deep canyon 8 metres (26 ft) wide with several rapids and small waterfalls that are passed by the salmon heading up the river. The current has scoured out large cavities in the pink granite river bed, which are called "giant cooking pots".

In its natural state, the Le Trait de Scie canyon is classified as an impassable obstacle for Atlantic salmon. In 2016, a fish pass was built in the canyon on the Aguanus/Aguanish River.

Aguanish River crosses the southwest of Aguanish municipality, it flows to its mouth in the Gulf of St. Lawrence, on the territory of almost 600 square kilometers of the municipality, in the Minganie RCM. The mouth is 25 kilometres (16 mi) west of Natashquan. The municipality and the Aguanish River were connected to the rest of Quebec by the extension of Route 138 in December 1996.

=== 2021 Major Grant Expedition ===
In July 2021, Noah Booth and the Northern Scavenger expedition team leave for the expedition Maze to the Aguanish journey. The wilds of Labrador and Quebec itinerary has been designed to follow the upper course of the Romaine and Petit-Mécatina rivers — two major rivers on the Côte-Nord currently being developed into hydroelectric complexes.

The Aguanish River (also called the Aguanus) flows through the heart of Côte-Nord, Quebec. Starting among the sphagnum-rich bogs of the Labrador–Quebec plateau, the unassuming river quickly gains momentum as it wathefalls of the ancient Laurentian mountain range through an array of commanding canyons, magnificent drops, and glacial landforms (i.e., eskers, drumlins and kames).

After the descent of the Aguanish, the 680 km journey by canoe, the expedition Royal Canadian Geographical Society-funded ended, in Aguanish municipality, the Jacques-Cartier Strait, and the Gulf of St. Lawrence. Source: Maze to the Aguanish 2021

Map, morning mist, sunny day, sunset on the river

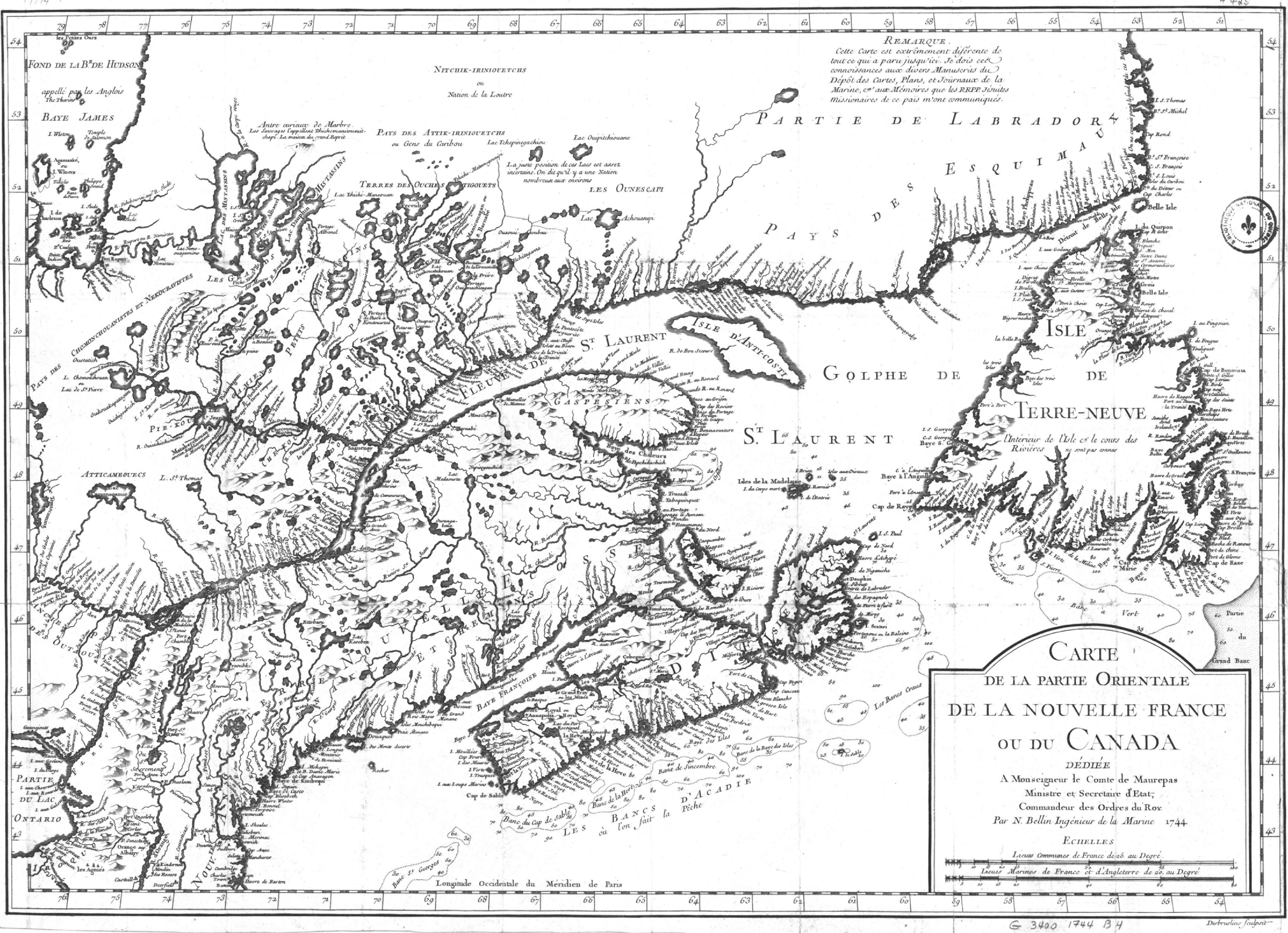
Eastern part of New France or Canada, Jacques Nicolas Bellin, name R. Guana or R. Guano, 1744

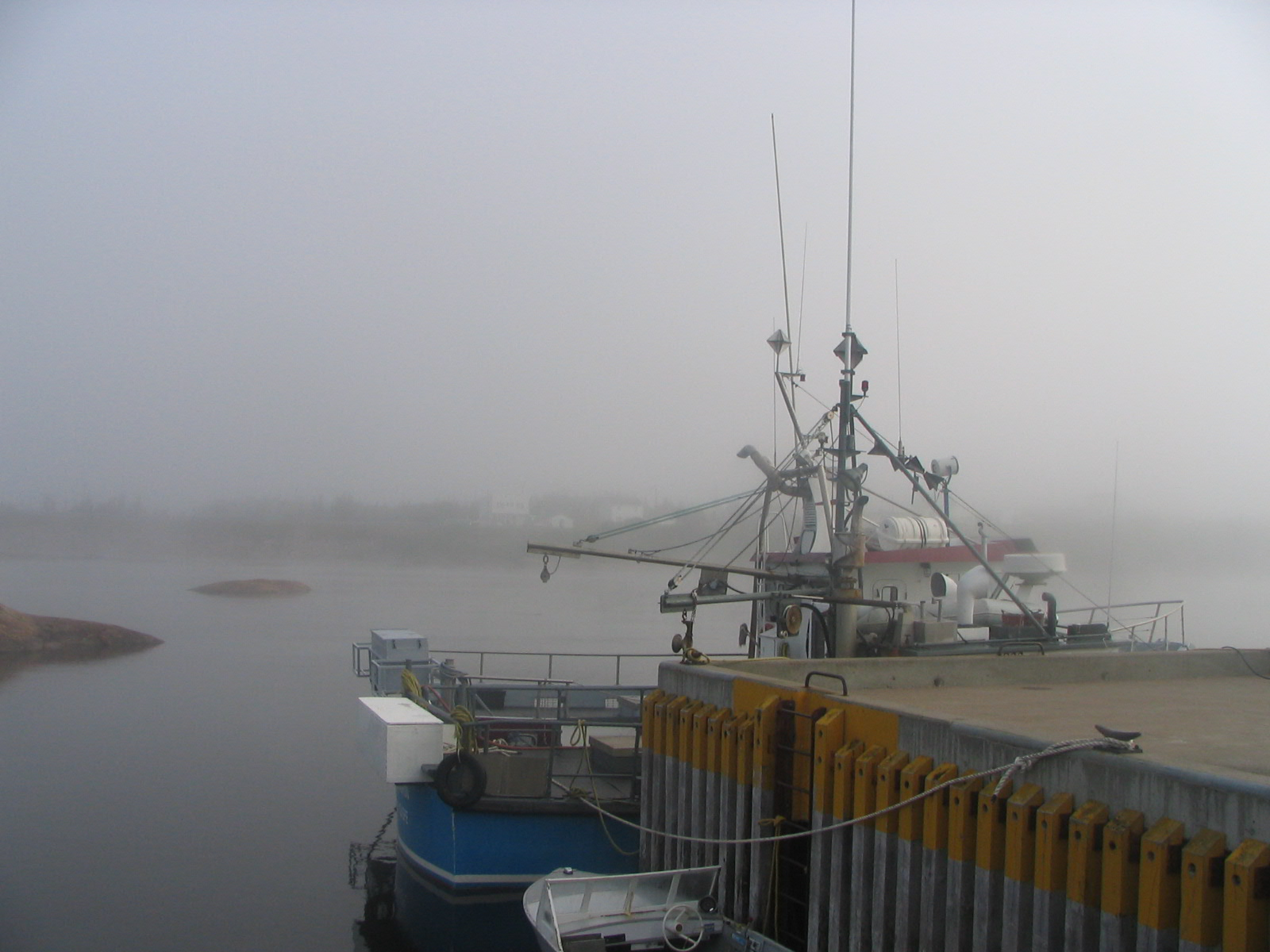
Dock and fishing boats

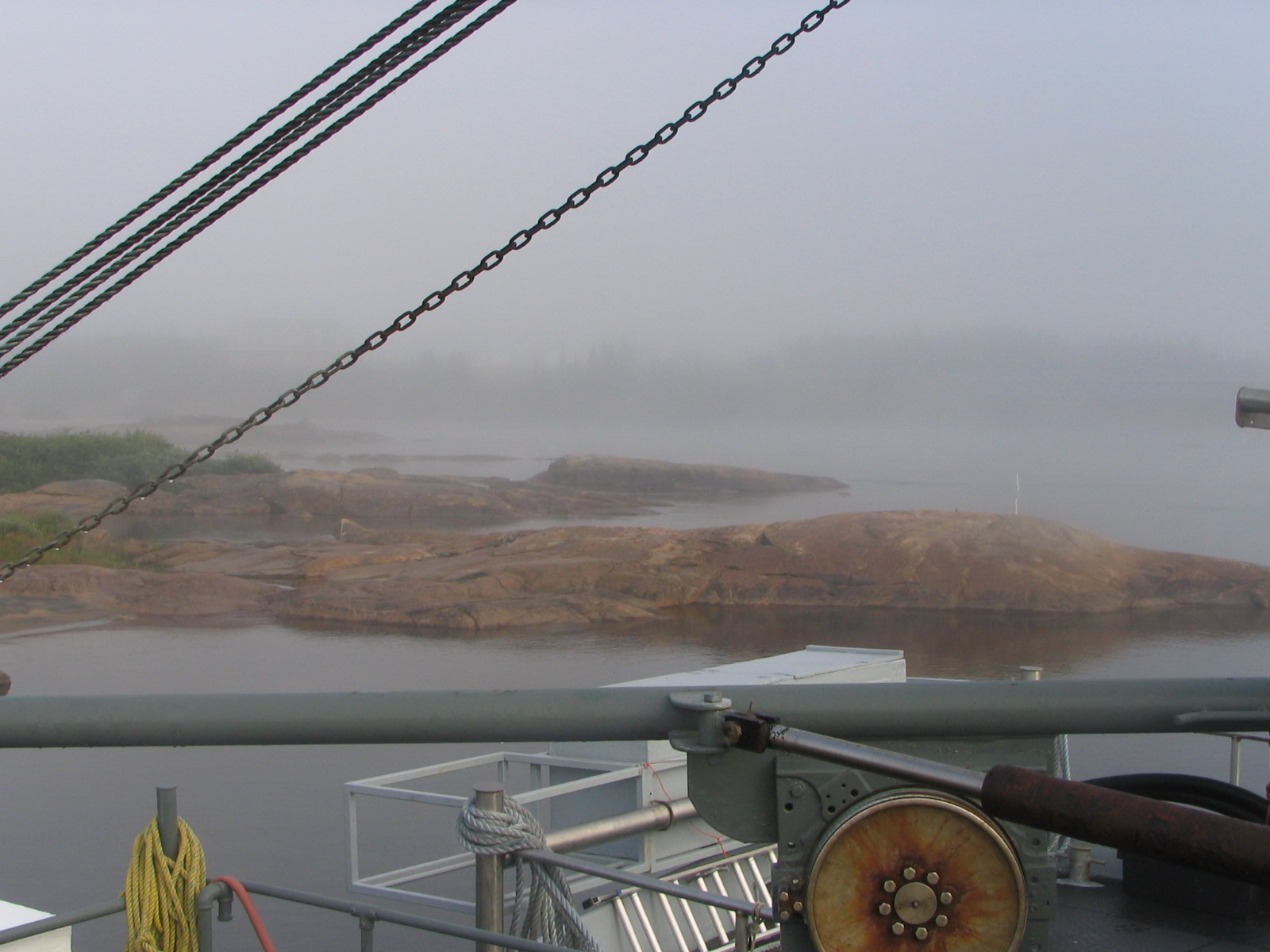
Dock and fishing boats

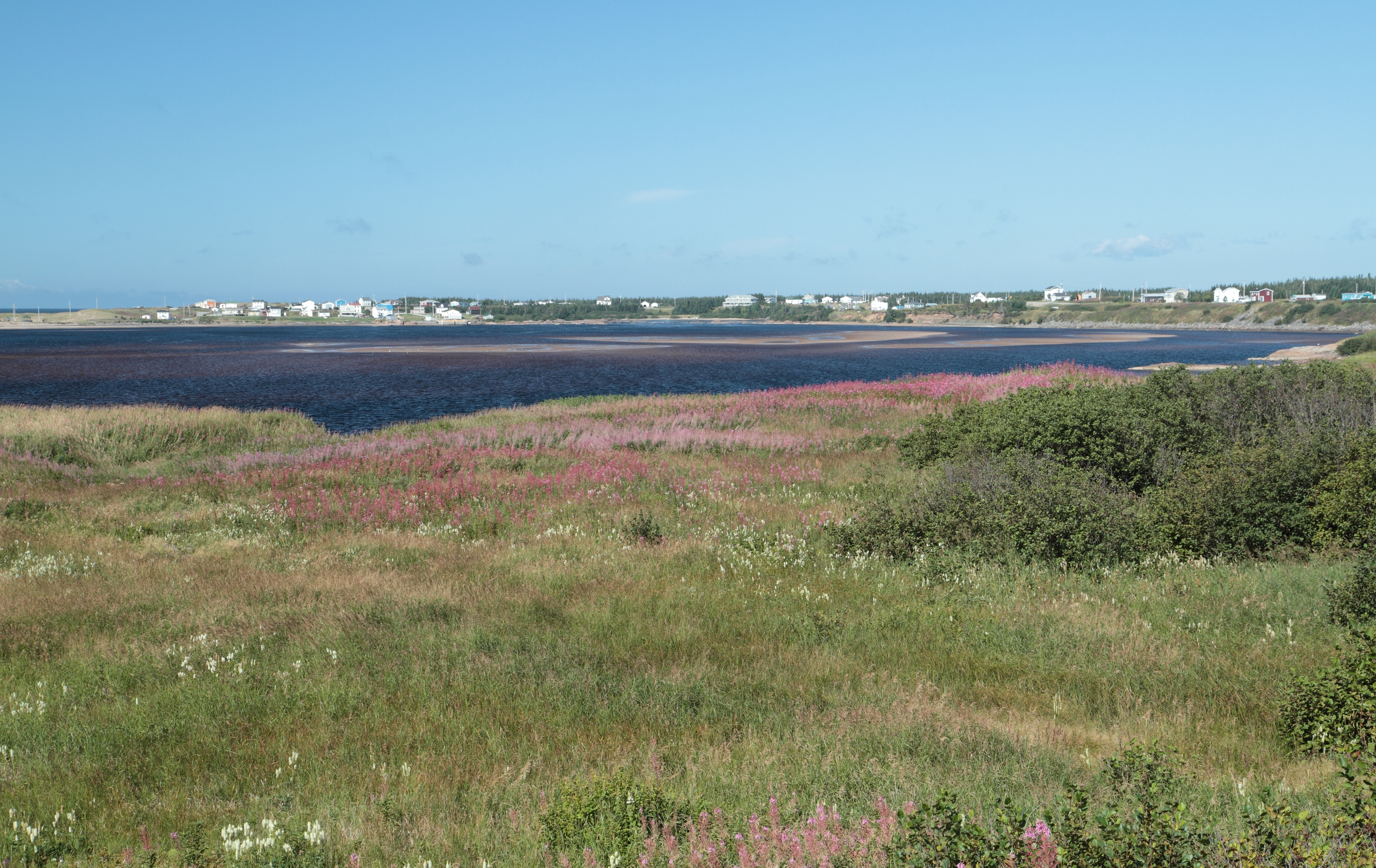
River and Municipality

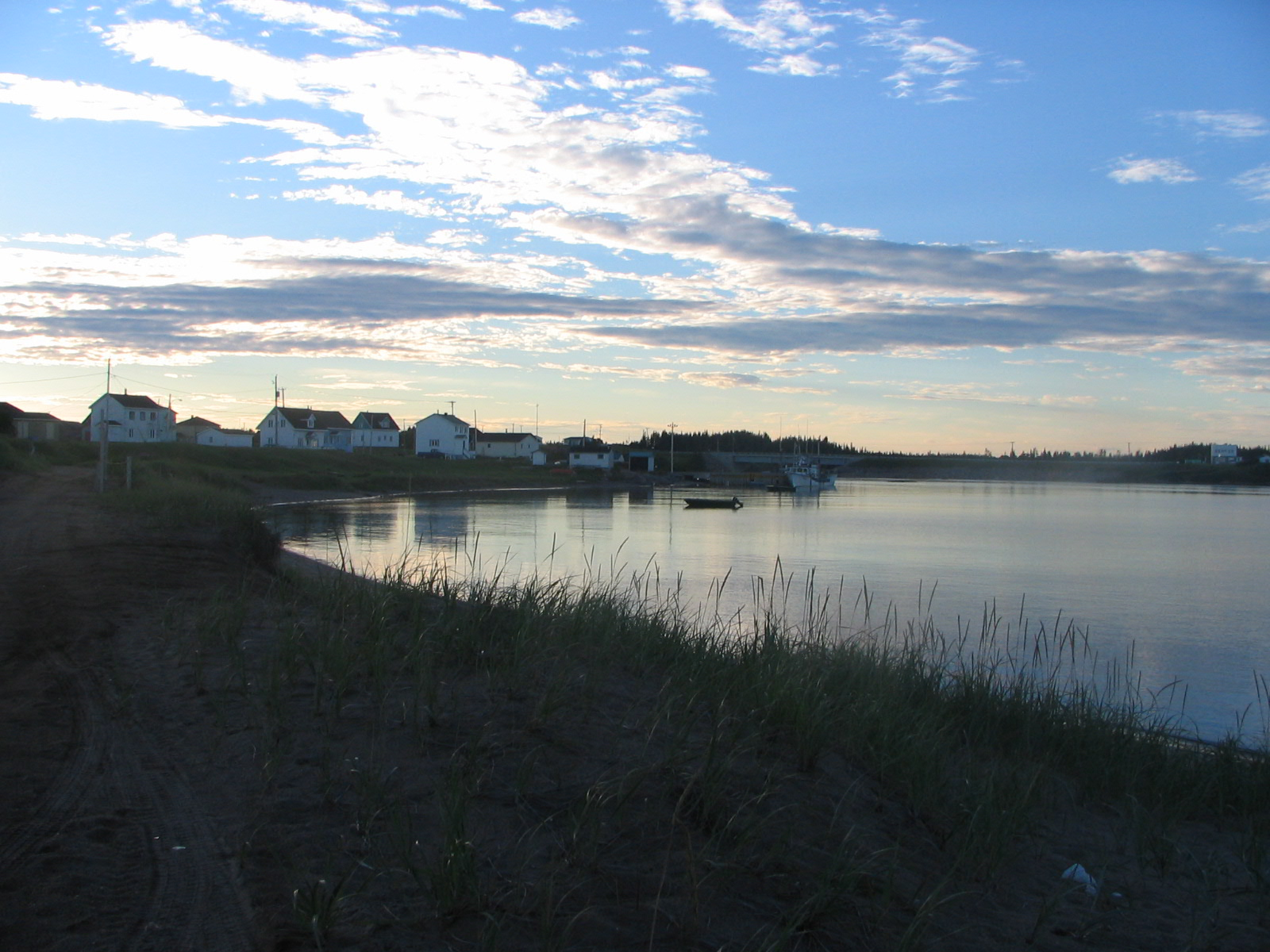
River and Municipality

== Name ==
The name is also given as Goynish River or Aguanus River. It has been spelled Goines (17th century), Guanis, Goinis (Jacques-Nicolas Bellin map of 1744), Goynish (1776 Carver map), Agwanus, Aguanus or Agouanus (19th-century maps). It probably comes from the Innu language akwanich, meaning "small shelter".

The "Aguanish River" name was made official on 11 April 1985.

== Description ==
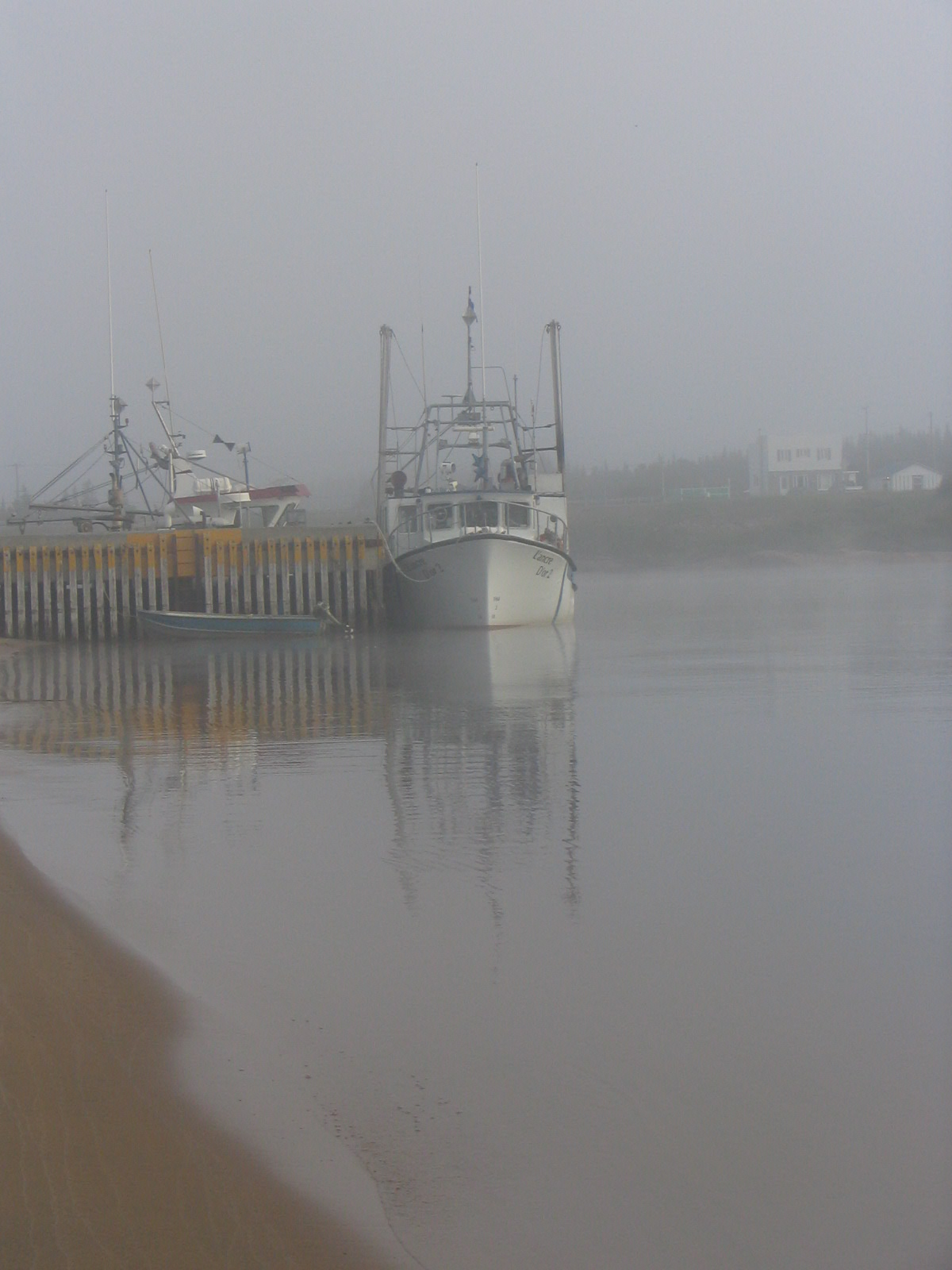
Dock and fishing boats

The Dictionary of rivers and lakes of the province of Quebec (1914) says Agwanus or Agouanus is a Montagnais word that means "where one unloads" boats.

AGWANUS, (RIVIÈRE). - Watercourse of the north coast of the St. Lawrence that forms the eastern boundary of the seigneury of Mingan. The English call it the Goynosh River. It is an excellent river for trout. A village lies on both banks of the river. The land, according to the surveyor Geo. Leclerc (1910) is fairly suitable for cultivation. Vessels drawing eight feet of water can easily enter the river. Eug, Rouillard, 1914, p.2.

Some say it means "poor place" or "place with little". Another theory is it comes from the Innu word akuannis meaning a beaver scooping mud from the river bottom to build its lodge.

== Basin ==
The basin covers 5,777 square kilometres (2,231 sq mi). It lies between the basins of the Nabisipi River to the west and the Natashquan River to the east. It is partly in the unorganized territory of Lac-Jérôme, partly in the municipality of Aguanish.

A map of the ecological regions of Quebec shows the river in sub-regions 6j-T and 6m-T of the east spruce/moss subdomain. Saucier, Robitaille, Grondin, Bergeron, 1998

== Fauna ==
The river has been open to recreational fishing since 1988, the most sought-after takes are:

- Salmo salar. — Saumon atlantique, Saumon ouananiche. — (Atlantic salmon, Landlocked salmon).
- Salvelinus fontinalis. — Omble de Fontaine. — (Brook trout).
- Esox lucius. — Grand brochet. — (Northern pike, Jackfish, Pickerel, Great northern pickerel).

The Innu of Natashquan have exclusive rights to the 4 kilometres (2.5 mi) stretch from the mouth to the Trait-de-Scie. There are six salmon pools below the first falls and three above the second falls. Most catches are 3.6–5.4 kilograms (7.9–11.9 lb). A 1984 study of the river identified 39 obstacles considered impassible to salmon on the river and its tributaries, with nine on the river itself from kilometre 5 upwards. The only significant amount of good habitat is upstream from kilometre 137, including the Aguanish North River.

In May 2015 the Ministry of Forests, Wildlife and Parks of Quebec announced a sport fishing catch-and-release program for large salmon on sixteen of Quebec's 111 salmon rivers. These were the Mitis, Laval, Pigou, Bouleau, aux Rochers, Jupitagon, Magpie, Saint-Jean, Corneille, Piashti, Watshishou, Little Watshishou, Nabisipi, Aguanish and Natashquan rivers. The Atlantic Salmon Federation said that the measures did not go nearly far enough in protecting salmon for future generations. In view of the rapidly declining Atlantic salmon population catch-and-release should have been implemented on all rivers apart from northern Quebec.

== Tourism ==
Located 6 km from the mouth of the Aguanish River, Le Grand-Portage, approximately 1.5 km long, allows you to bypass the Le Trait de Scie canyon. A boardwalk facilitates access to the portage for visitors, salmon fishermen or hikers.

To highlight the canyon site, the will of the villagers, the originality of the site, the retention of visitors, and its economic contribution, combined with the significant traffic, are the main reasons considered for undertaking infrastructure work welcome.

== Also read ==
- List of rivers of Quebec
