= Saint-Jean River (Minganie) =

Saint-Jean River Usasumekw, Patamo, Rivière Saint-Jean (French)
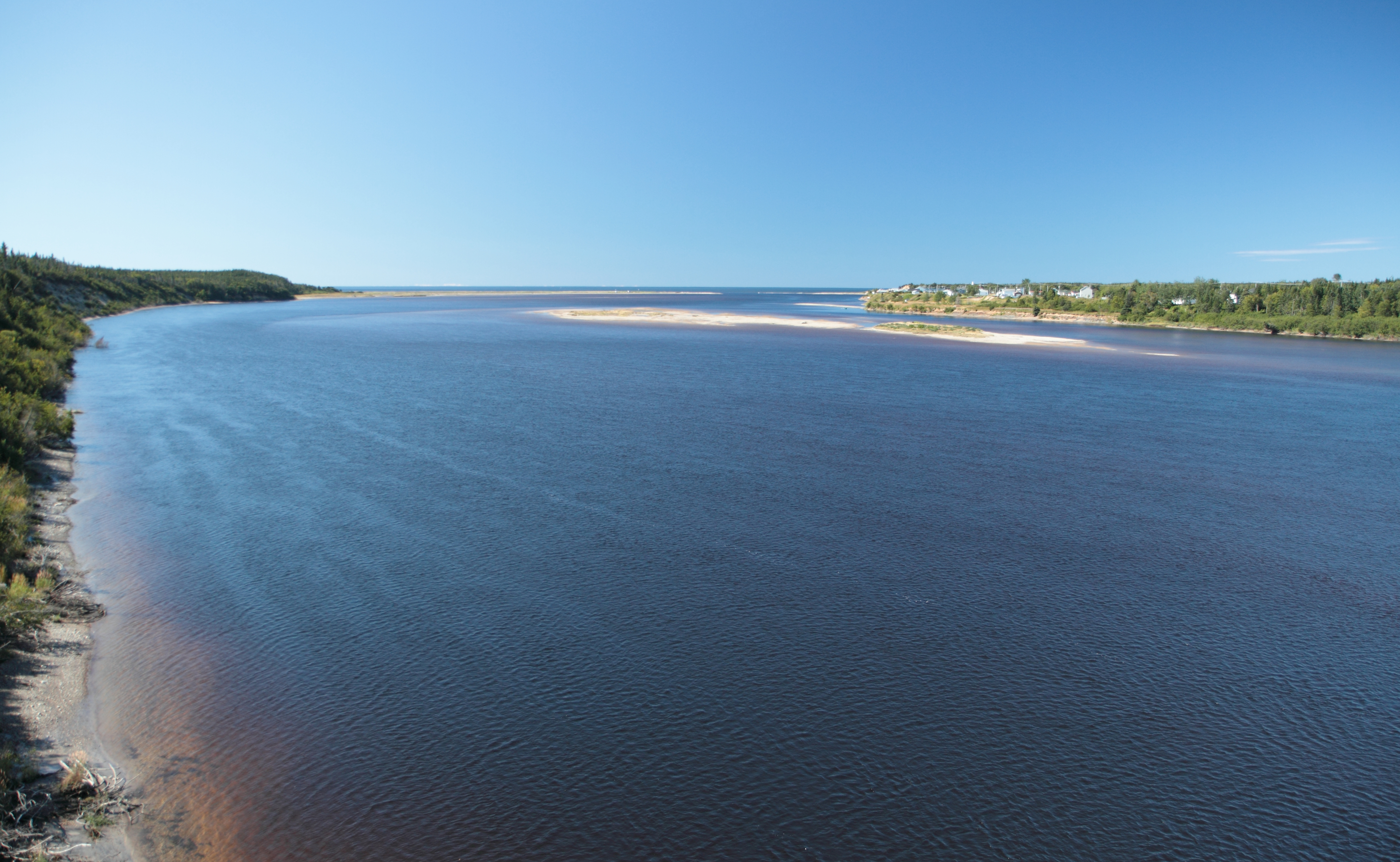
- From Quebec Route 138

- Location within Quebec

Location
- Country: Canada
- Province: Quebec
- Region: Côte-Nord
- RCM: Minganie

Physical characteristics
- Mouth: Gulf of St. Lawrence
  - coordinates: 50.283333°N 64.334444°W
  - elevation: 0 metres (0 ft)
- Length: 240 kilometres (150 mi)
- Basin size: 6,000 square kilometres (2,300 sq mi)

The Saint-Jean River, Usasumekw, Patamo (Traditional indigenous variants), Rivière Saint-Jean (French), is a salmon river that flows from north to south, emptying into the Gulf of St. Lawrence, in Rivière-Saint-Jean municipality, Minganie RCM, Côte-Nord, Quebec, Canada.

Sport fishing for Atlantic salmon in the waters of the Saint-Jean River dates back over 150 years.

== Natural Territory ==
The Saint-Jean River rises at about 500 metres (1,600 ft) above sea level in the southwest of Labrador. It runs through rugged terrain for 240 kilometres (150 mi) to the Gulf of St. Lawrence. Its mouth is 160 kilometres (99 mi) east of Sept-Îles, in Rivière-Saint-Jean Municipality, Minganie RCM. At its mouth the river is crossed by Quebec Route 138, then flows past the village of Rivière-Saint-Jean.

The river basin covers 5,600 square kilometres (2,200 sq mi), is bordered to the northeast by the Romaine watershed, to the east by the Mingan watershed, to the west by the Magpie watershed and a small section to the northwest by Labrador.

=== Ground ===
On the edge of the Gulf of St. Lawrence, the area of the coastal plain, not very rugged, forms a strip of 10 km wide, with some low hills not exceeding 150 m in altitude.
Towards the north, the piedmont area rises to an altitude of 300 m and stretches for 22 km, in a relief of more rugged rounded rocky hills.
Further north, for approximately 100 km, the dominant physiographic zone occupies half of the territory of the Saint-Jean River watershed. It is a high plateau slightly inclined towards the south, very rugged and deeply cut by alluvial valleys, dominated at 1,023 m altitude by the massif located between the Saint-Jean river and the Rapide river.
On the Laurentian Plateau, at an altitude between 600 and 800 m, the north of the Saint-Jean River watershed is characterized by more undulating and less rugged relief.

Saint-Jean River overview

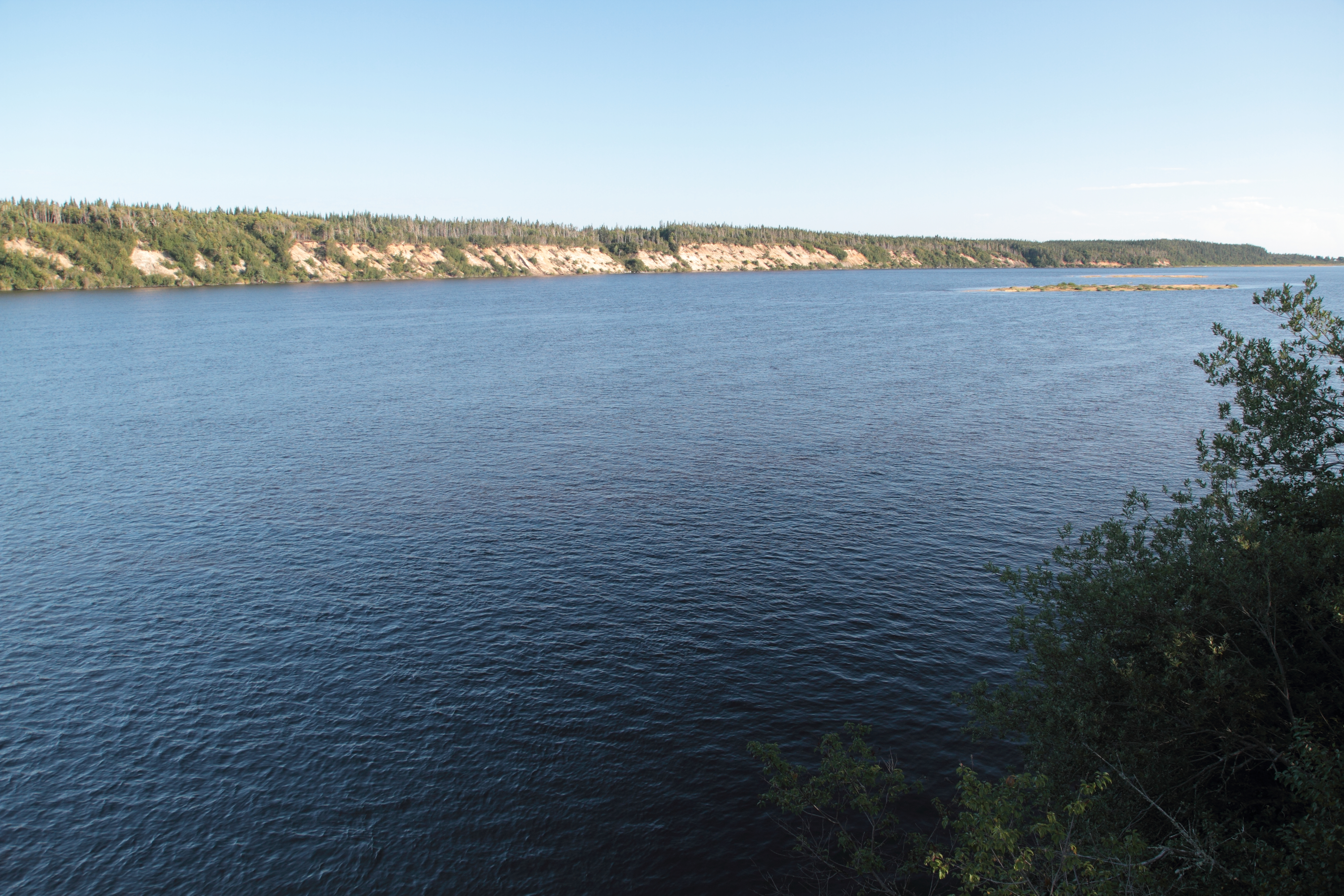

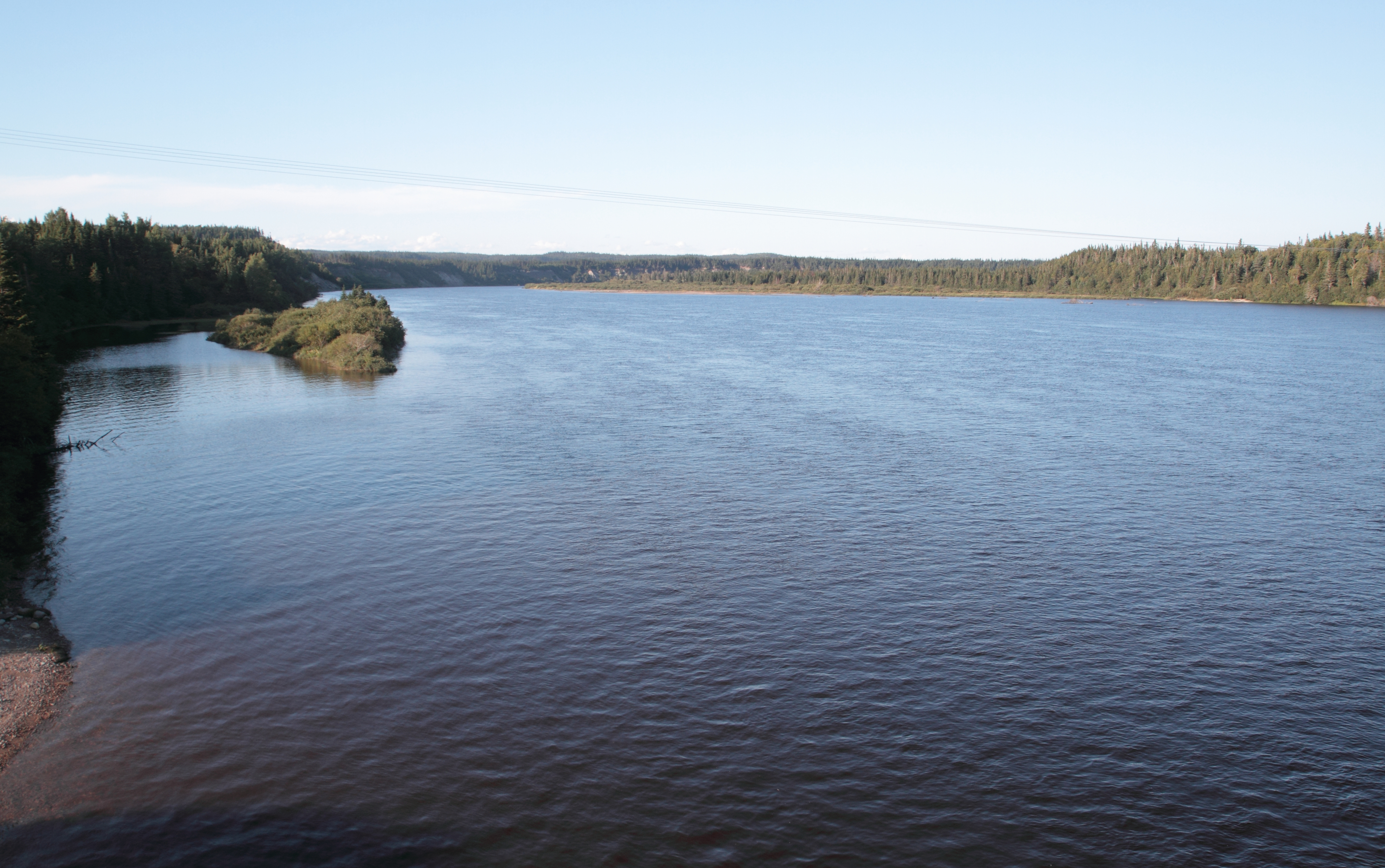

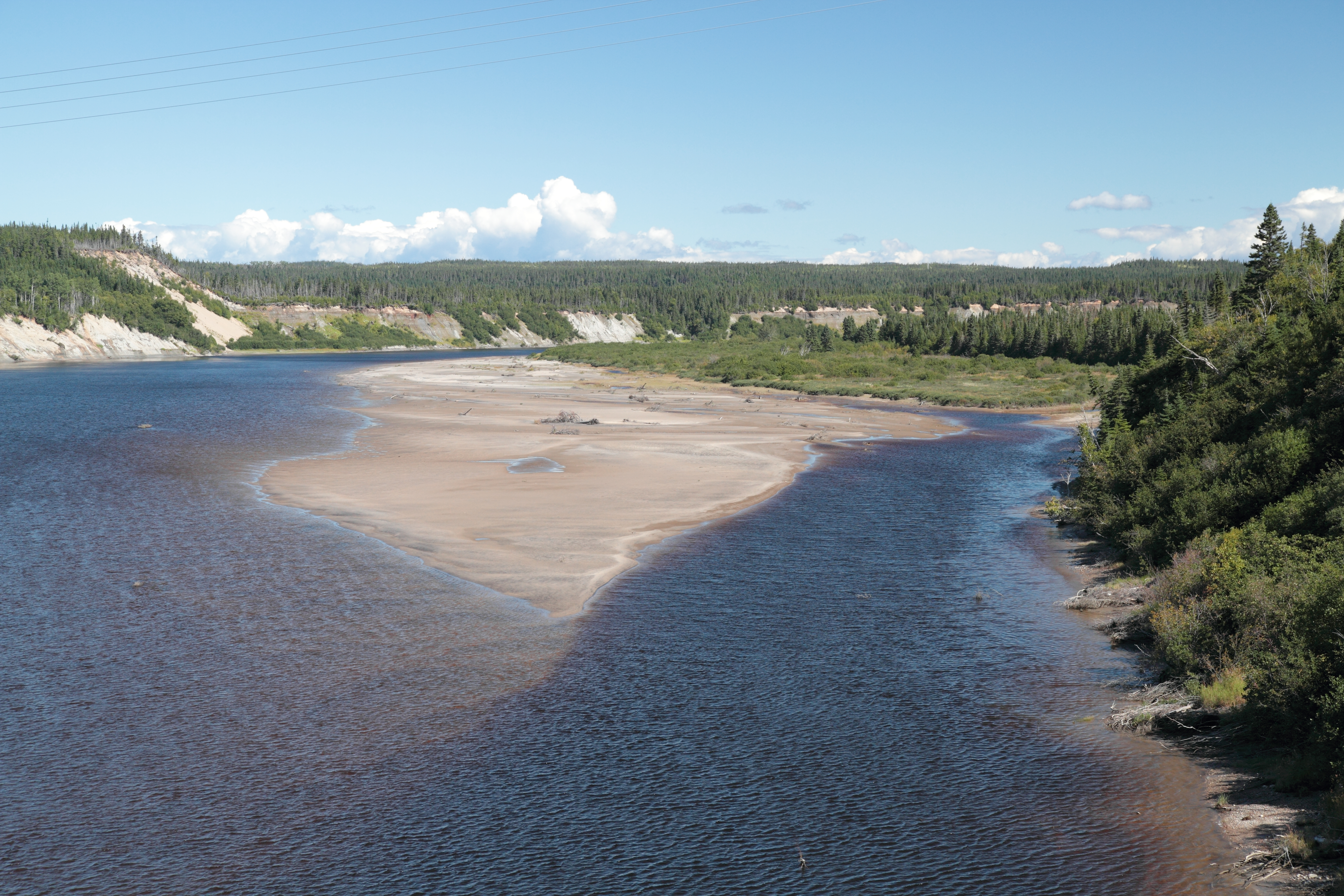

== Geography ==
According to the Dictionary of rivers and lakes of the province of Quebec (1914)

Saint-Jean River, Saguenay County, flows through the Laurentians Mountains and empties into the Gulf of St. Lawrence about (segment of 112 km (70 mi) down from the Moisie River, and (segment of 619 km (385 mi) from Quebec City. It is navigable for canoes for a stretch of (segment of 48 km (30 mi) up to a powerful waterfall that interrupts navigation. The shores from its mouth to about three miles are, according to the surveyor C.E. Forgues (1885), clay cliffs on which there is a layer of sand mixed with black earth, which makes this land suitable for growing potatoes and oats. The same clay extends along the coast for up to fifteen miles, but the terrain is not as good for culture. The main trees are white spruce, fir, birch, alder and willow. The climate is very healthy, but summer is short. According to Henry de Puyjalon (1841–1905), it is a salmon river of the first order. The hunting territories are also of great value. Between the two estuaries of the river there is a large plateau of good land on which the Rivière-Saint-Jean municipality is built, which has a population of 250 souls. The Robin House here has a large cod fishing establishment (Magpie).

== Toponymy ==
The Innu use the word "Usasumekw", which can be translated as Salmon River, "rivière à saumon" (French), to identify the watercourse. The toponym "Rivière Saint-Jean" was formalized on December 5, 1968, by Commission de toponymie du Québec.

== Fishing ==
In May 2015 the Quebec Ministry of Forests, Wildlife and Parks announced a sport fishing catch-and-release program for large salmon on sixteen of Quebec's 111 salmon rivers. These were the Mitis, Laval, Pigou, Bouleau, aux Rochers, Jupitagon, Magpie, Saint-Jean, Corneille, Piashti, Watshishou, Little Watshishou, Nabisipi, Aguanish and Natashquan rivers. The Quebec Atlantic Salmon Federation said that the measures did not go nearly far enough in protecting salmon for future generations. In view of the rapidly declining Atlantic salmon population catch-and-release should have been implemented on all rivers apart from northern Quebec.

The Pourvoirie de la Haute Saint-Jean has exclusive rights to three fishing areas with 55 pools along 30 kilometres (19 mi) of the Saint-Jean and 14 kilometres (8.7 mi) of the Salmon River (Rivière aux Saumons). Between 2012 and 2016 the annual average reported catch of salmon was 123 juveniles and 28 large fish, with 412 returned to the water.

== See also ==
- Louis Babel
- Estuary of Saint Lawrence
- List of rivers of Quebec
