= Corneille River =

Corneille River Rivière de la Corneille
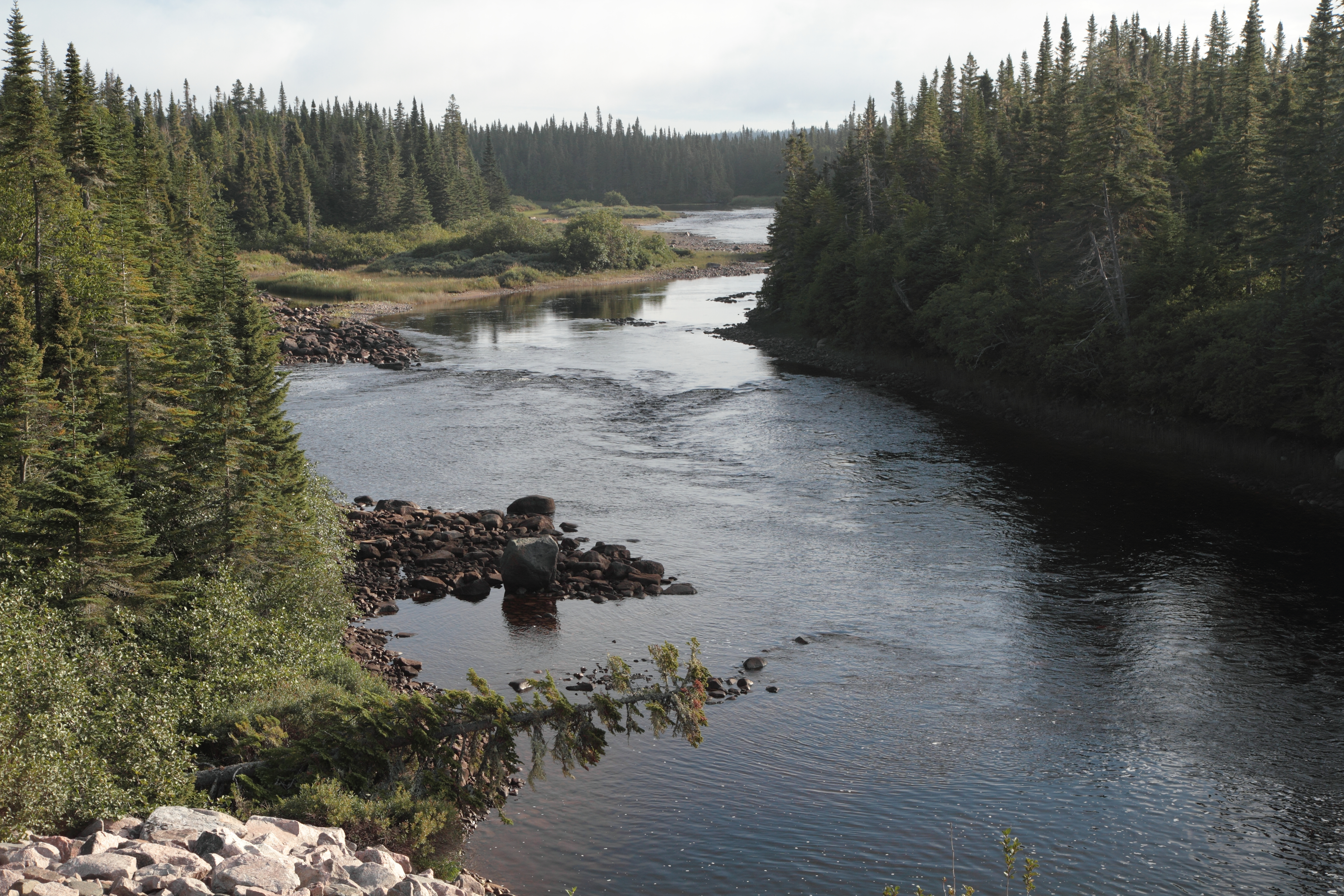
- Corneille River looking north from Quebec Route 138

- Location within Quebec

Location
- Country: Canada
- Province: Quebec
- Region: Côte-Nord
- RCM: Minganie

Physical characteristics
- Mouth
  - coordinates: 50.2844444°N 62.8980556°W
  - elevation: 0 metres (0 ft)
- Length: 82 kilometres (51 mi)
- Basin size: 563 square kilometres (217 sq mi)

The Corneille River (French: Rivière de la Corneille; River of the crow) is a river in the Côte-Nord region of Quebec, Canada. It empties into the Gulf of Saint Lawrence opposite Anticosti Island.

== Location ==
The Corneille River is about 82 kilometres (51 mi) long. The watershed covers an area of 563 square kilometres (217 sq mi). It lies between the basins of the Ours River to the west and the Piashti River to the east. The river basin covers part of the unorganized territory of Lac-Jérôme, and parts of the municipalities of Baie-Johan-Beetz and Havre-Saint-Pierre. The mouth of the river is in the municipality of Baie-Johan-Beetz in the Minganie Regional County Municipality. The origin of the name is unknown.

A map of the ecological regions of Quebec shows the river in sub-regions 6j-T and 6m-T of the east spruce/moss subdomain.

== Description ==
According to the Dictionnaire des rivières et lacs de la province de Québec (1914),

Situated on the north coast of the Saint Lawrence, Saguenay County, to the east of the Romaine and Ours rivers. Its flow is quite fast, and is interrupted by several falls. The river drains several beautiful lakes enclosed in mountains with a height that varies from 100 to 300 feet. According to the surveyor B.A. Houde (1899 report), there is no wood to speak of along this river; from the first lake to the third, one finds nothing but burned trees and rocks. This river has great value for hunting and fishing. The trout bite very well, and there are many fur animals.

== Fishing ==
The La Corneille outfitter has exclusive fishing rights to 19 kilometres (12 mi) of the Corneille River. They provide accommodation, and easy access to productive Atlantic salmon pools. There is also plentiful brook trout. The outfitter is based on a granite island at the confluence of the Corneille River and the Gulf of St. Lawrence. It is 60 kilometres (37 mi) east of Havre-St-Pierre, accessible by car along Quebec Route 138. The island is in the Mingan Archipelago National Park Reserve.

Only the first 9.3 kilometres (5.8 mi) of the river is readily accessible to salmon, which cannot pass a waterfall 5.6 metres (18 ft) high at the confluence of Lake Tanguay and the Corneille River. In 2014 a program funded by Hydro-Québec as part of the development of the Romaine River hydroelectric project built a path by which the salmon could pass this obstacle. Controlled blasting in the bedrock created an excavated channel near the left bank that carried about 10% of the river's flow to create a salmon run. This gave the fish access to an additional 60 kilometres (37 mi) of the river, and reduced the time they spent at the foot of the falls, where they were at risk of poaching.

Follow-up activities include inventories using electrical fishing, a scientific research project to measure the interaction between the salmon and other fish species in the upstream section, including landlocked salmon, and a camera system to monitor several sites where intruders could access the river for illegal fishing.

In May 2015 the Ministry of Forests, Wildlife and Parks of Quebec announced a sport fishing catch-and-release program for large salmon on sixteen of Quebec's 118 salmon rivers. These were the Mitis, Laval, Pigou, Bouleau, Aux Rochers, Jupitagon, Magpie, Saint-Jean, Corneille, Piashti, Watshishou, Little Watshishou, Nabisipi, Aguanish and Natashquan rivers. The Quebec Atlantic Salmon Federation said that the measures did not go nearly far enough in protecting salmon for future generations. In view of the rapidly declining Atlantic salmon population catch-and-release should have been implemented on all rivers apart from northern Quebec.

== Sources ==
- "La Corneille", Québec Original (in French), Tourisme Québec
- Portrait préliminaire de la zone de gestion intégrée de l'eau par bassin versant Duplessis (PDF) (in French), OBV Duplessis, April 2015
- Quebec salmon need stronger preservation rules, association says, Montreal: CBC News, 10 May 2015
- Rapport annuel 2014 (PDF) (in French), Programme de mise en valeur des habitats du saumon atlantique de la Côte-Nord
- Rivière de la Corneille (in French), Commission de toponymie du Québec
- Rivière de la Corneille (in French), Natural Resources Canada
- Rivière de la Corneille (in French), Saumon Québec
- Rouillard, Eugène (1914), "Coacoachou, (Rivière)", Dictionnaire des rivières et lacs de la province de Québec (in French), Québec. Département des terres et forêts
- Saucier, J.-P.; Robitaille, A.; Grondin, P.; Bergeron, J.-F.; Gosselin, J. (2011), Les régions écologiques du Québec méridional (PDF) (map), 4 (in French), Ministère des Ressources naturelles et de la Faune, archived from the original (PDF) on 2020-06-19
