= Laval River =

River in Quebec (Canada)

- Location within Quebec
- Native name: Rivière Laval (French)

Location
- Country: Canada
- Province: Quebec
- Region: Côte-Nord
- RCM: La Haute-Côte-Nord

Physical characteristics
- Source
  - location: Lac Septembre
  - coordinates: 49.1116667°N 69.3°W
- Mouth
  - coordinates: 48.773104°N 69.050295°W

The Laval River (French: Rivière Laval) is a salmon river in the Côte-Nord region of Quebec, Canada.

== Location ==
The mouth of the Laval River is in Forestville, La Haute-Côte-Nord. Route 385 roughly follows the course of the river. The Commission de toponymie du Québec does not have information about the name, which was made official on 5 December 1968. A map of the ecological regions of Quebec shows the Laval River in sub-region 5g-T of the east fir/white birch subdomain.

== Course ==
The Laval River originates in Lac Septembre and flows generally southeast through Lac Roger, Lac Kinney, Lac Stanley and Lac Laval, which it enters at the southwest angle and leaves from the southeast end. The 656 hectares (1,620 acres) Lac Laval, 42 kilometres (26 mi) from its mouth, is sometimes taken as the source of the river. The river then flows through Lac Éric and Lac Courdeau, then enters a flat-bottomed valley where it is fed by the Adam River, receives water from Lac MacDonald and Lac Madeleine, and then enters Lac à Jacques.

Below this lake, after some rapid sections, the river passes under Quebec Route 138 at Pont-Laval, near its mouth. The 33 hectares (82 acres) Laval River Rare Forest (Forêt rare de la Rivière-Laval) is on the east side of the river between Lac à Jacques and Route 138. It is unusual in including red pines (Pinus resinosa), which are very rare on the Côte-Nord. The river enters the Saint Lawrence in the Baie Laval just north of the community of Forestville. The Pointe Laval defines the southeast point of the bay, and the Île Laval is in the mouth of the bay.

The rate of flow of the river varies considerably, from slow to fast. The bed of the river is rather dark, the waters are not very clear, and some of the pools are black. After rain the river level and color change significantly.

== Fishing ==
For many years Anglo Pulp and Paper, a paper mill, owned the fishing rights, until the government of Quebec made the river a wildlife reserve. The Forestville Hunting and Fishing Association was formed on 16 October 1968, and in 1978 became responsible for a 1,325 square kilometres (512 sq mi) reserve known as the Forestville ZEC (zone d’exploitation contrôlée: controlled use zone). The Association took over management of the Laval River in spring of 1980. The Forestville Hunting and Fishing Association now manages the River Laval ZEC. There are 67 salmon pools and 45 trout pools. Both the Atlantic salmon (Salmo salar) and the sea trout (Salmo trutta) are plentiful and are much larger than average. The large Lac à Jacques holds excellent northern pike (Esox lucius).

In May 2015 the Ministry of Forests, Wildlife and Parks of Quebec announced a sport fishing catch-and-release program for large salmon on sixteen of Quebec's 118 salmon rivers. These were the Mitis, Laval, Pigou, Bouleau, Aux Rochers, Jupitagon, Magpie, Saint-Jean, Corneille, Piashti, Watshishou, Little Watshishou, Nabisipi, Aguanish and Natashquan rivers. The Quebec Atlantic Salmon Federation said that the measures did not go nearly far enough in protecting salmon for future generations. In view of the rapidly declining Atlantic salmon population catch-and-release should have been implemented on all rivers apart from northern Quebec.

In 2019 the Upper North Shore Watershed Agency (Organisme des bassins versants de la Haute-Côte-Nord) conducted inventories of the fish in the Laval River's tributaries. They had studied the spawning grounds of the river in 2018, and concluded there was no obstacle to the salmon run on one of the tributaries. Three more tributaries had been identified that could be accessible. By better understanding the streams used for reproduction by the Atlantic salmon they would be able to better protect the environment and thus protect the fish.

== Sources ==
- Forêt rare de la Rivière-Laval (PDF) (in French), Ministère des Ressources naturelles, de la Faune et des Parcs, Direction de l’environnement forestier
- Kennedy, Shirley (9 August 2019), "La faune piscicole de la rivière Laval dans l'œil de l'OBVHCN", Journal Haute-Côte-Nord (in French)
- Notre organisme (in French), Forestville ZEC
- Quebec salmon need stronger preservation rules, association says, Montreal: CBC News, 10 May 2015
- Rivière Laval (in French), Commission de toponymie du Québec
- Rivière Laval, Natural Resources Canada
- Rivière Laval (in French), Saumon Québec
- Saucier, J.-P.; Robitaille, A.; Grondin, P.; Bergeron, J.-F.; Gosselin, J. (2011), Les régions écologiques du Québec méridional (PDF) (map), 4 (in French), Ministère des Ressources naturelles et de la Faune, archived from the original (PDF) on 2020-06-19
