= Piashti River =

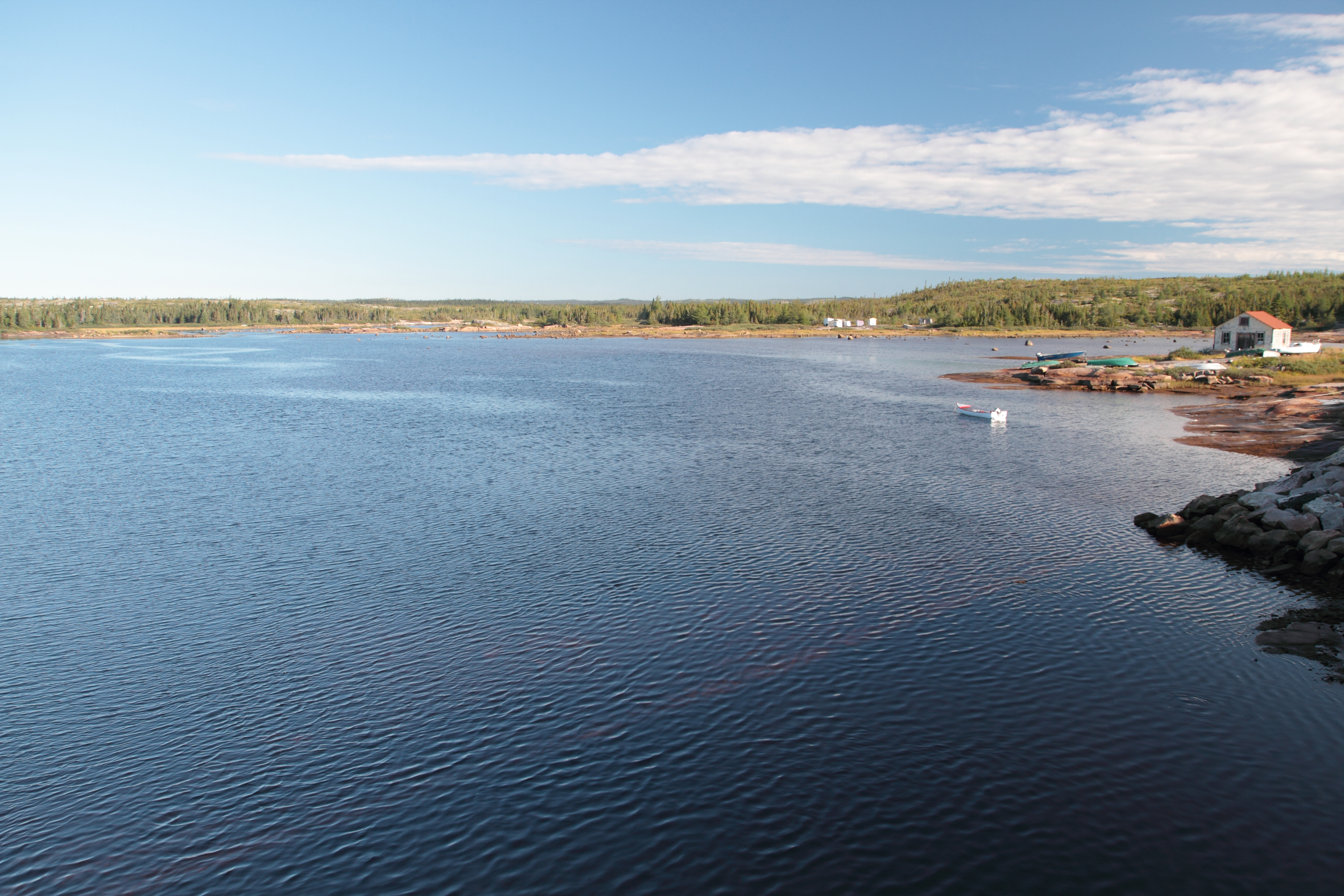
- Bay, close to river's mouth, from Route 138

- Location within Quebec

Location
- Country: Canada
- Province: Quebec
- Region: Côte-Nord
- RCM: Minganie

Physical characteristics
- Mouth: Gulf of Saint Lawrence
  - coordinates: 50.2863889°N 62.8052778°W
  - elevation: 0 metres (0 ft)
- Length: 20 kilometres (12 mi)
- Basin size: 386 square kilometres (149 sq mi)

Piashti River (French: Rivière Piashti) is a salmon river, tributary of the Gulf of St. Lawrence, located in Baie-Johan-Beetz municipality, Minganie RCM, Côte-Nord region, Quebec, Canada.

== Location ==
The Piashti River flows in a north-south direction for 20 kilometres (12 mi) from Lake Piashti via Little Lake Piashti into Johan-Beetz Bay.

The river basin covers 386 square kilometres (149 sq mi). It is between the basins of the Corneille River to the west and the Quetachou River to the east.

The basin is partially in the unorganized territory of Lac-Jérôme. The river flows into Lake Salé (Salt Lake) about 2 kilometres (1.2 mi) from its mouth over a dramatic waterfall. This lake receives the fresh water of the river, but also receives the salt water of Gulf of St. Lawrence during high tides.

Piashti River Cultural and Natural heritages

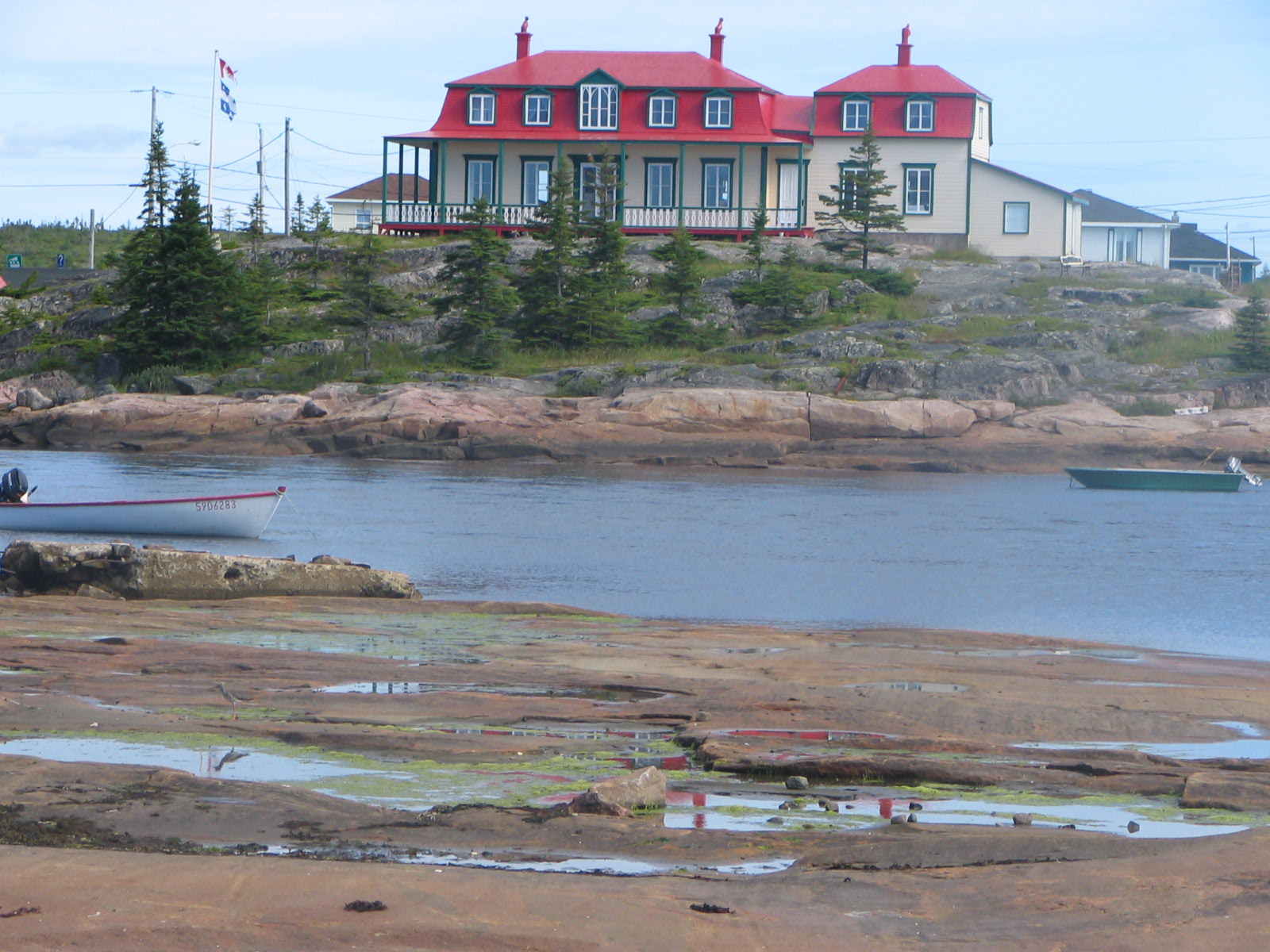
Family residence of Johan Beetz and Adéla Tanguay (Le Chateau)

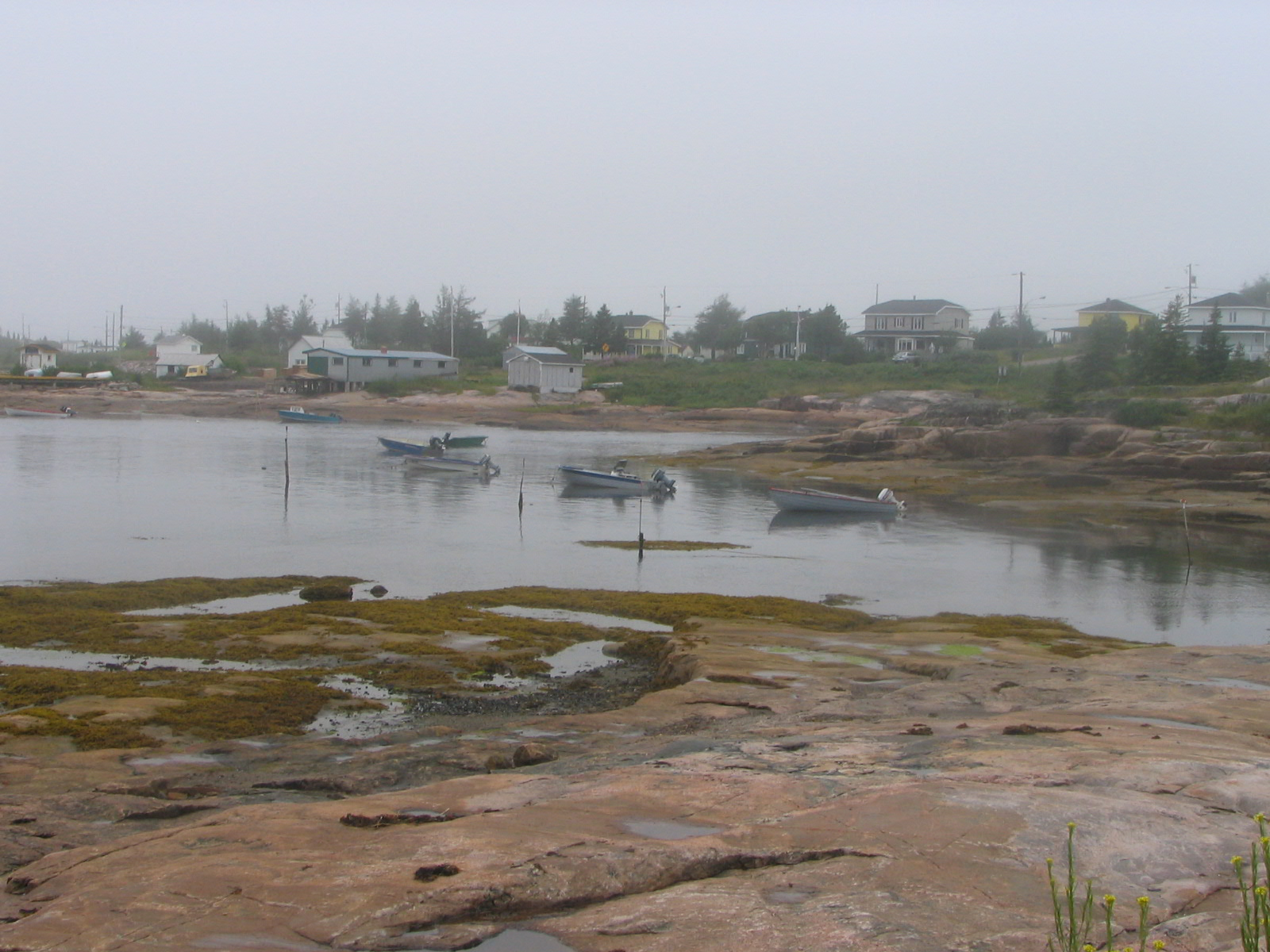
Baie-Johan-Beetz, boats at anchor, sheds and wooden boardwalks

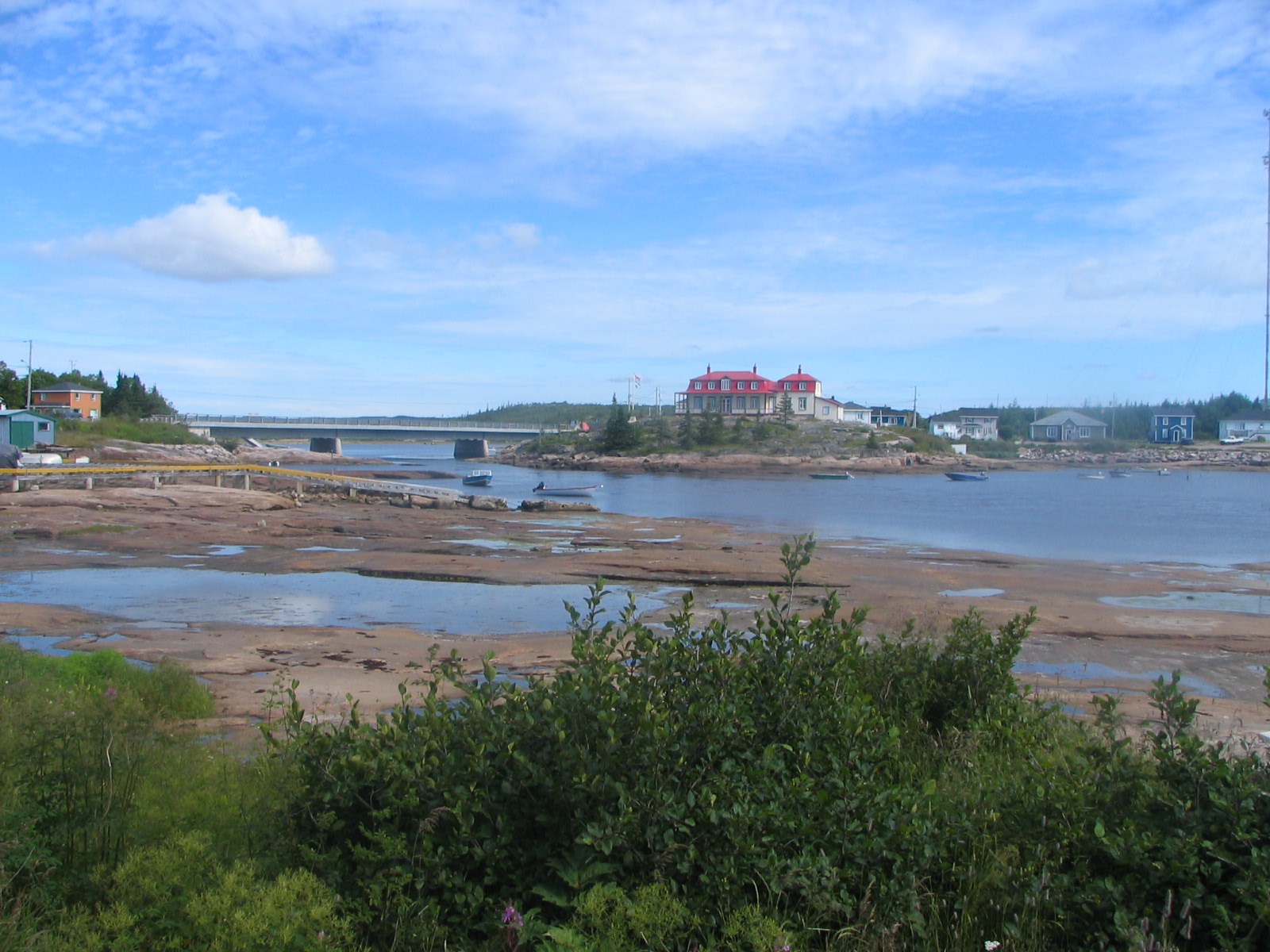
Route 138, steel girder bridge 15881, built in 1989, Chateau Johan Beetz, the river and outcropping rocks of the Canadian Shield

== Name ==
The name "Piashti" originally applied only to the bay, and was later used for the river and the lakes. It means "dry bay", and perhaps refers to the fact that the bay is only accessible at high tide for vessels of average draft. The 1685 map by Jean-Baptiste-Louis Franquelin shows "Piastebe" as a place frequented by the Innu. In 1908 Eugène Rouillard sometimes wrote "Rivière Piasthi Bay" or "Rivière Piashbe Bay. The 1913 Regional Map of the North Shore of the Gulf of St. Lawrence named it "Piashtibaie River". In 1914 the Geography Commission used the form "Piashtih" for the bay.

== Description ==
According to the Dictionnaire des rivières et lacs de la province de Québec (1914), PIASHTI-BAIE (river)

- Located on the north shore of the St. Lawrence, 14 miles from Pointe-des-Esquimaux and 15 miles from the Corneille River. This watercourse is formed, so to speak, of a succession of lakes connected by short stretches of rapids. Three miles from its mouth, says surveyor H. H. Robertson (1889), there are falls of 150 feet surrounded by fairly good woods. The lakes are beautiful, the mountains low and partly wooded. The territory watered by this river has scarcely any agricultural value, according to the same surveyor, and the forest was burned in the past. There is, however, a new growth of white and black spruce, tamarack and birch. Salmon frequent this river, especially at the foot of the first fall, and it is also considered excellent for hunting. The Piasthi-Baie post, which dates back to 1862, includes a dozen families who live off the cod and lobster fishery. A Belgian has also undertaken breeding of black fox.

== Environment ==
Map of the ecological regions of Quebec shows the river in sub-regions 6j-T and 6m-T of the east spruce/moss subdomain.

The north of the Piashti valley has potential for use by moose (Alces alces), and traces of moose were found in the region in 1978 and 1979. Lake Salé has large beds of aquatic grass, and is frequented by several species of seabirds. A banding station for migratory birds operated at Lake Salé until 2004, and held the record for the highest concentration of green-winged teal (Anas carolinensis) in North America. Birds of prey include the merlin (Falco columbarius) and bald eagle (Haliaeetus leucocephalus).

The river has clear water and a bed of dark-colored gravel and large pebbles. The last 6 kilometres (3.7 mi) are accessible to Atlantic salmon (Salmo salar). Other species of fish are brook trout (Salvelinus fontinalis), Arctic char (Salvelinus alpinus), landlocked salmon and American eel (Anguilla rostrata). Baie-Johan-Beetz Outfitter has exclusive fishing rights to Lake Salé and the Piashti River. There are eight pools where salmon may be caught from a boat or wading.

In May 2015 the Ministry of Forests, Wildlife and Parks of Quebec announced a sport fishing catch-and-release program for large salmon on sixteen of Quebec's 118 salmon rivers. These were the Mitis, Laval, Pigou, Bouleau, Aux Rochers, Jupitagon, Magpie, Saint-Jean, Corneille, Piashti, Watshishou, Little Watshishou, Nabisipi, Aguanish and Natashquan rivers. The Quebec Atlantic Salmon Federation said that the measures did not go nearly far enough in protecting salmon for future generations. In view of the rapidly declining Atlantic salmon population catch-and-release should have been implemented on all rivers apart from northern Quebec.
