= Jupitagon River =

Jupitagon River Rivière Jupitagon
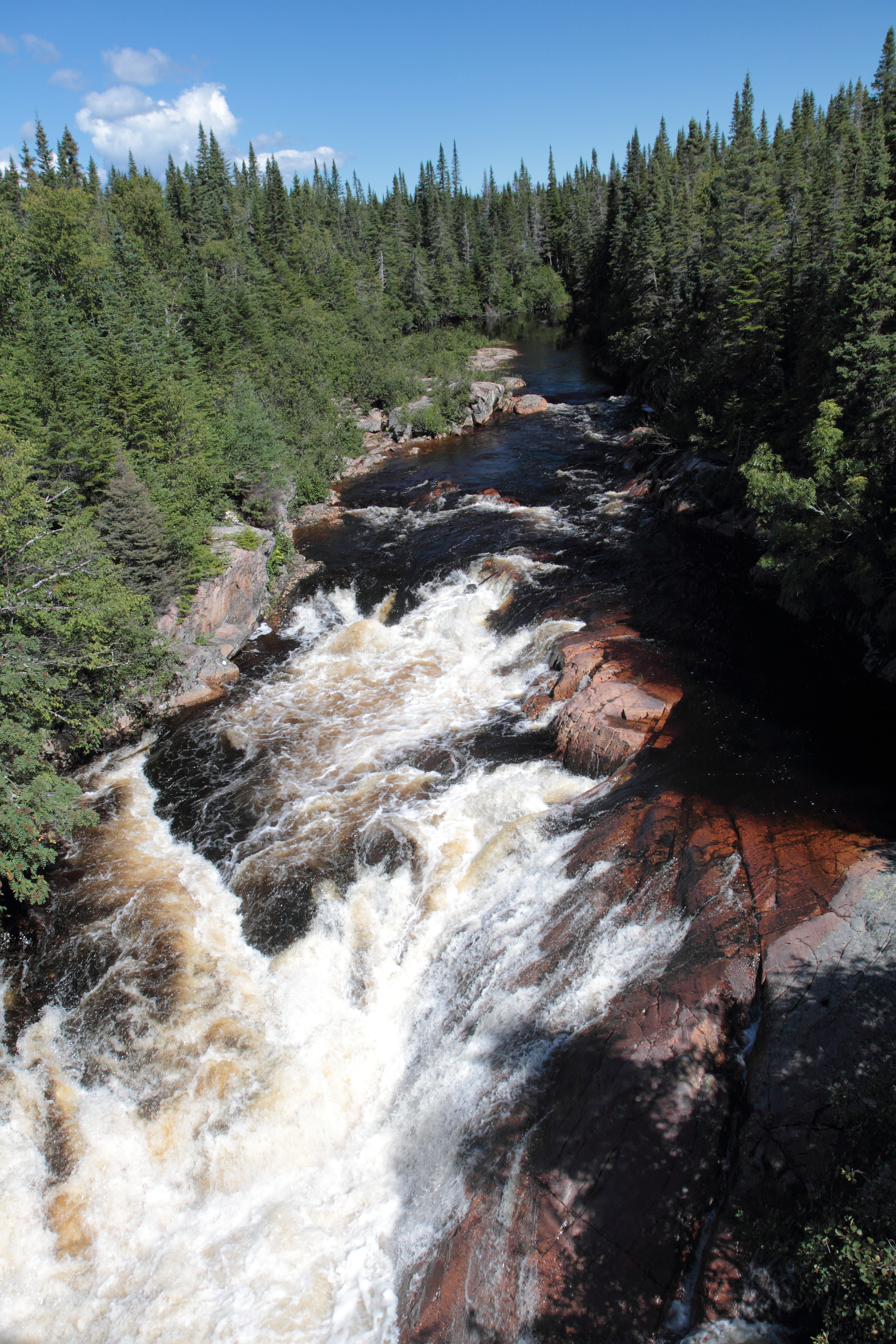
- Looking upstream from Quebec Route 138

- Location within Quebec
- Native name: Atshukupakatan Hipis (Innu)

Location
- Country: Canada
- Province: Quebec
- Region: Côte-Nord
- RCM: Minganie

Physical characteristics
- Source
  - elevation: 366 metres (1,201 ft)
- Mouth: Gulf of Saint Lawrence
  - coordinates: 50.2872222°N 64.5844444°W
  - elevation: 0 metres (0 ft)
- Length: 49 kilometres (30 mi)
- Basin size: 225 square kilometres (87 sq mi)
- Discharge
  - location: Mouth
  - average: 8 cubic metres per second (280 cu ft/s)
  - minimum: 2 cubic metres per second (71 cu ft/s)
  - maximum: 20 cubic metres per second (710 cu ft/s)

The Jupitagon River (French: Rivière Jupitagon) is a salmon river in the Côte-Nord region of Quebec, Canada. It flows south through boreal forests from the Canadian Shield to the Gulf of Saint Lawrence. In 2018 salmon fishing was banned on the river due to critically low stocks.

== Location ==
The Jupitagon River flows south to the Saint Lawrence between the Magpie River to the east and the Tonnerre River to the west. The mouth of the river is in the municipality of Rivière-Saint-Jean in the Minganie Regional County Municipality. The mouth is 12 kilometres (7.5 mi) east of the village of Rivière-au-Tonnerre.

At the start of the 20th century there was a hamlet called Jupitagon at the mouth of the river where some fishermen's families lived. In 1903 there was a Eudist missionary station at the mouth of the river. Père Arthur Gallant (1896-1976) was a Eudist missionary at Rivière-Saint-Jean with responsibility for the dessertes of Longue-Pointe-de-Mingan, Magpie and Jupitagon from 1928 to 1938. Today the location is used by vacationers.

== Name ==
The Innu of Mingan call the river the Atshukupakatan Hipis or Atshukukupitan Hipis, meaning "little river with the sea-lion".

On the 1744 map by Charlevoix, published by Jacques-Nicolas Bellin in the Histoire générale de la Nouvelle-France (General History of New France), the Jupitagon River is referred to as Ouapitougan. The name is written by different sources as Jupitagun, Jupitagan, Jupitagone and Chipitagun. Some say it is derived from the Innu language ouapitagon or shusshupitagan meaning "river with sharpening-stones". Others claim that the word is a distortion of the Cree and Atikamekw chiwitagan, which means "salt". Some 20th century authors think the name has the same origin as the Ouapitagone Archipelago, 300 kilometres (190 mi) west, which some texts call Jupitagan.

== Basin ==
The Jupitagon River watershed is elongated, with a 37 kilometres (23 mi) north-south axis and a width up to 12 kilometres (7.5 mi) downstream. It lies between the basins of the Tonnerre River to the west and the Magpie River to the east. It covers 225 square kilometres (87 sq mi) of the Minganie Regional County Municipality, divided between the unorganized territory of Lac-Jérôme (47.1%) and the municipalities of Rivière-Saint-Jean (34.0%} and Rivière-au-Tonnerre (18.9%).

A small part of the northern watershed is on the plateau of the Canadian Shield, where the land slopes steeply and reaches an elevation of 420 metres (1,380 ft). Most of the watershed is in the piedmont area to the south of the plateau, which falls from 300 to 150 metres (980 to 490 ft) in elevation. This is a belt about 20 kilometres (12 mi) wide of rounded rocky hills. The coastal plain is 8 kilometres (5.0 mi) wide, relatively flat land that slopes from 150 metres (490 ft) down to the shore of the Gulf of Saint Lawrence.

The coastal plain and a small section to the northwest are on orthopyroxene granitoid rocks. The remainder is on an anorthosite massif. The bedrock of the plateau and the piedmont area is covered by an undifferentiated and discontinuous layer of glacial till no more than 2 metres (6 ft 7 in). On the coastal plain the Goldthwait Sea deposited large quantities of marine clay and silt sediments, which were later covered by sandy deltaic sediments.

== Hydrology ==
The streams and rivers follow angular courses dictated by the fractures of the bedrock. On the plateau and in the piedmont area the rivers mostly flow through straight V-shaped valleys, although the Jupitagon River flows through an old U-shaped glacial valley in the center of the catchment area, where it has a winding course. On the coastal plain the river and its tributaries make many meanders through the loose sediment.

The Jupitagon River runs for 49 kilometres (30 mi) from north to south with a vertical drop of 366 metres (1,201 ft). It is generally narrow and shallow, apart from a few places such as Lake Atsuk about 15 kilometres (9.3 mi) upstream and the base of the falls at its mouth. The annual average flow at its mouth is estimated as 8 cubic metres per second (280 cu ft/s), varying from 2 to 20 cubic metres per second (71 to 706 cu ft/s) during the year. The river has two sizable tributaries, the Petite rivière au Foin in the southeast part and an unnamed stream in the southwest.

There are many water bodies, covering 8.22% of the watershed. Most are long and narrow, oriented from north to south. The Maloney, Belley, Panneau, Brochets and Martre lakes each have an area of just over 1 square kilometre (0.39 sq mi). Ombrotrophic bogs cover 2.29% of the basin, mostly on the coastal plain. There are few flat surfaces further inland where wetlands can develop, and no large wetlands.

== Environment ==
The Rivière-au-Tonnerre weather station, 14 kilometres (8.7 mi) from the mouth of the Jupitagon, reports an annual average temperature of 1.1 °C (34.0 °F) and annual average rainfall of 1,080 millimetres (43 in). Temperatures would be lower inland.

A map of the ecological regions of Quebec shows the Jupitagon in sub-regions 6j-T and 6m-T of the east spruce/moss subdomain. Black spruce (Picea mariana) forest dominates the coastal plain. Inland in the piedmont and plateau area the forest is a mix of black spruce and balsam fir (Abies balsamea), with mossy groundcover. There was a serious infestation of hemlock looper moths (Lambdina fiscellaria) in the late 1990s and early 2000s which caused widespread defoliation of the fir trees.

The north shore of the Gulf of Saint Lawrence from the mouth of the Jupitagon to Magpie harbor is the Waterfowl Concentration Area of the Jupitagon River, Magpie Harbor (Aire de concentration d'oiseaux aquatiques de la Rivière Jupitagon, Havre de Magpie), designated an IUCN Management Category IV water fowl gathering area since 1998. It is managed by the Quebec Ministère des Forêts, de la Faune et des Parcs.

== Fish ==
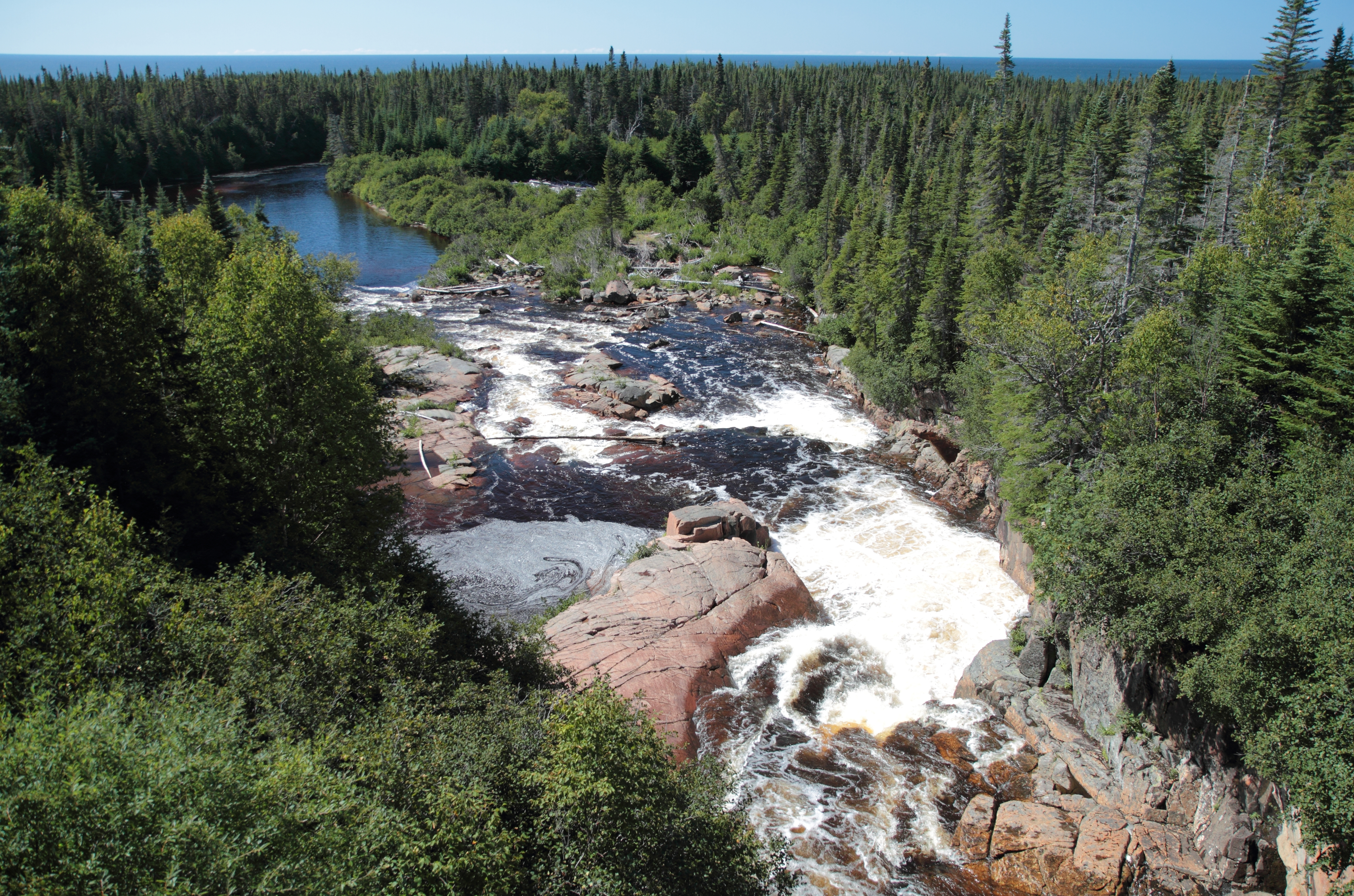
The river looking south towards the Gulf from Quebec Route 138

An 1859 account said that salmon were plentiful. The downstream section of the Jupitagon River is known as an Atlantic salmon river, but there is an impassable fall within 1 kilometre (0.62 mi) from its mouth, which would prevent migration. Between 1984 and 2017 annual reported catches of salmon peaked at 92 in 1990 and since then steadily declined, with an average of 4 per year in 2012–2016. Some of the decline may have been due to fishing restrictions. Other species are brook trout (Salvelinus fontinalis), American eel (Anguilla rostrata), rainbow smelt (Osmerus mordax) and three-spined stickleback (Gasterosteus aculeatus).

In May 2015 the Ministry of Forests, Wildlife and Parks of Quebec announced a sport fishing catch-and-release program for large salmon on sixteen of Quebec's 118 salmon rivers. These were the Mitis, Laval, Pigou, Bouleau, Aux Rochers, Jupitagon, Magpie, Saint-Jean, Corneille, Piashti, Watshishou, Little Watshishou, Nabisipi, Aguanish and Natashquan rivers. The Quebec Atlantic Salmon Federation said that the measures did not go nearly far enough in protecting salmon for future generations. In view of the rapidly declining Atlantic salmon population catch-and-release should have been implemented on all rivers apart from northern Quebec.

On 1 April 2018 sport fishing for salmon in the Jupitagon River was prohibited, since the population was critically low. Fishing for other species was allowed, but if a salmon were caught it must be returned to the water.

== Sources ==
- Aire de concentration d'oiseaux aquatiques de la Rivière Jupitagon, Havre de Magpie in Canada, Protected Planet
- Bilan de l'exploitation du saumon au Québec en 2017 (PDF) (in French), ministère des Forêts, de la Faune et des Parcs, Secteur de la faune, 15 February 2018
- "La pêche du saumon atlantique est interdite sur la rivière Jupitagon", Rendez-vous nature (in French)
- "Les Îlets Jérémie du Père Gallant", Les Eudistes (in French), Société Historique de la Côte-Nord
- Portrait du bassin versant Jupitagon (PDF) (in French), OBV Duplessis
- Portrait préliminaire de la zone de gestion intégrée de l'eau par bassin versant Duplessis (PDF) (in French), OBV Duplessis, April 2015
- Postes et dessertes des missionnaires eudistes en 1903 (PDF) (map) (in French), Diocese of Baie-Comeau
- Quebec salmon need stronger preservation rules, association says, Montreal: CBC News, 10 May 2015
- Rivière Jupitagon (in French), Commission de toponymie du Québec
- Rivière Jupitagon (in French), Ressources naturelles Canada
- Rouillard, Eugene (1906), Noms géographiques de la province de Québec et des provinces maritimes (PDF) (in French), Québec: Marcotte
- Saucier, J.-P.; Robitaille, A.; Grondin, P.; Bergeron, J.-F.; Gosselin, J. (2011), Les régions écologiques du Québec méridional (PDF) (map), 4 (in French), Ministère des Ressources naturelles et de la Faune, archived from the original (PDF) on 2020-06-19
