= Mitis River =

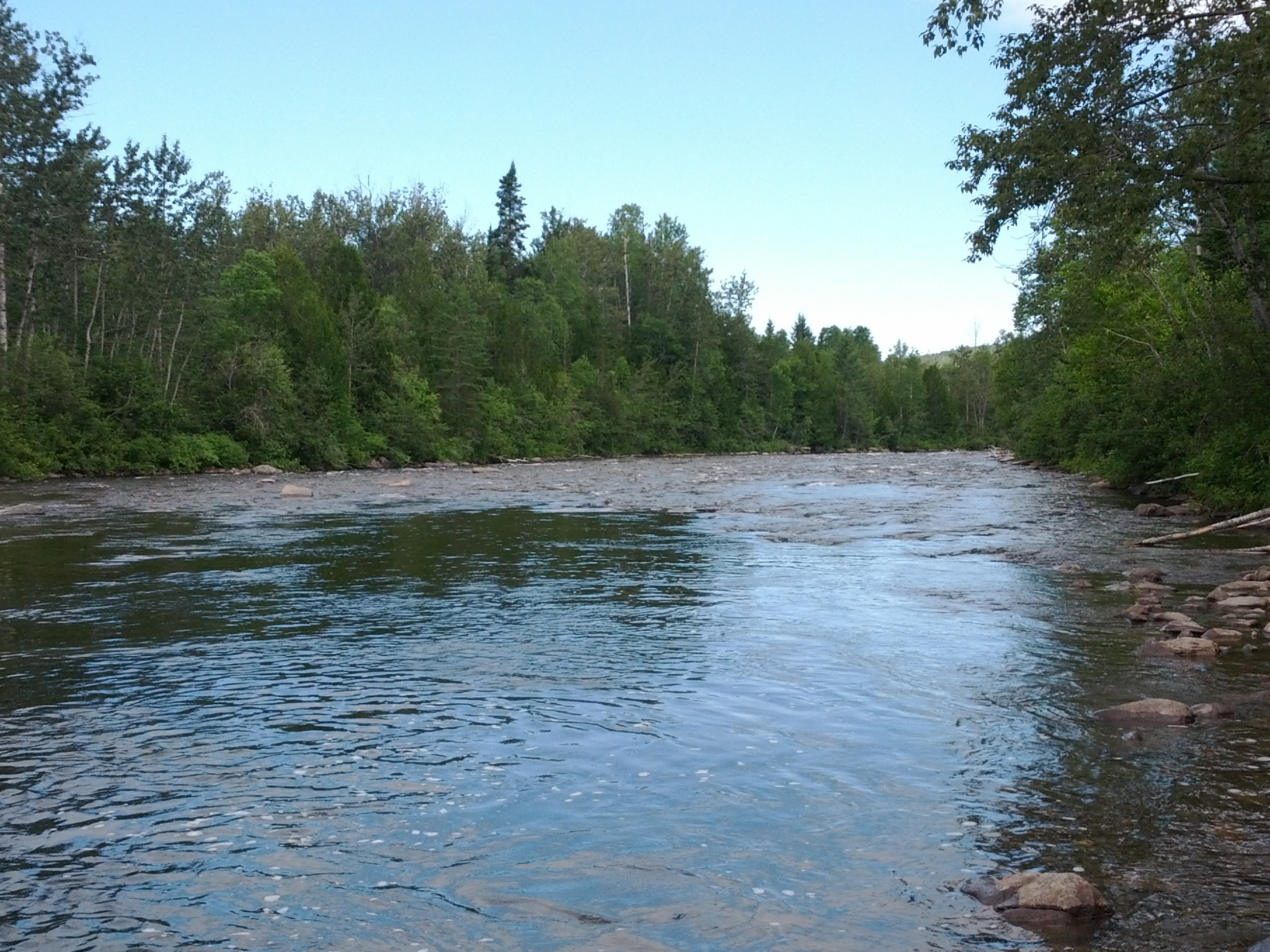
- A reach of the upper river

- Location within Quebec
- Native name: Rivière Mitis (French)

Location
- Country: Canada
- Province: Quebec
- Region: Bas-Saint-Laurent
- RCM: La Mitis Regional County Municipality

Physical characteristics
- Source: Lake Mitis
  - coordinates: 48.2911111°N 67.7547222°W
  - elevation: 305 metres (1,001 ft)
- Mouth: Saint Lawrence River
  - coordinates: 48.63083°N 68.135°W
  - elevation: 0 metres (0 ft)
- Length: 51 kilometres (32 mi)
- Discharge
  - location: Mouth
  - average: 16 cubic metres per second (570 cu ft/s)

The Mitis River (French: Rivière Mitis) is a salmon river in the Bas-Saint-Laurent region of Quebec, Canada. It flows to the south shore of the Saint Lawrence River. There are two hydroelectric dams on the river at a point where a waterfall used to prevent salmon from going further upstream. A system to capture and transport salmon upstream was installed in 1965, and the river now has a healthy salmon population along its whole length.

== Course ==
The Mitis River originates in Lake Mitis in the Notre Dame Mountains, at an elevation of 305 metres (1,001 ft). Lake Mitis is a large reservoir 25 kilometres (16 mi) long formed from the Superior, Croix and Inferior lakes. The Mitis dam and the hamlet of Lac-Mitis are at the source of the river. The river is swelled by many tributaries as it flows north for 74 kilometres (46 mi). (Note: The Commission de toponymie du Québec gives the river's length as 74 kilometres (46 mi). Saumon Québec says it is 48 kilometres (30 mi) long. GrandQuebec says it is 51 kilometres (32 mi) long, or 55 kilometres (34 mi) according to some sources. The Parc régional de la rivière Mitis also gives 51 kilometres (32 mi).) Towards its mouth, in the Price municipality near Mont-Joli, the river meanders before being crossed by the Mitis-1 and Mitis-2 dams. It ends in the Baie Mitis on the south shore of the Saint Lawrence. Its mouth is near Sainte-Flavie, about 32 kilometres (20 mi) east of Rimouski.

The Mitis River is between the Matane and Rimouski rivers. It gives its name to La Mitis Regional County Municipality. The main tributaries are the Neigette and Mistigougèche rivers. The average flow is 16 cubic metres per second (570 cu ft/s), a steady rate due to the two dams built in the first half of the 20th century. (Note: Saumon Québec says the average discharge of the river is 35 cubic metres per second (1,200 cu ft/s).) The river can be accessed from a path that runs along its length. The river bed has fairly large rocks and red clay, but little gravel. The clay gives the clear river water a slightly reddish tinge after a heavy rainfall.

== Name ==
The name was given by the Listuguj Miꞌgmaq First Nation of Restigouche, who used to use it as a route to the Saint Lawrence. It appears in the title deed of the Seigneurie de Mitis, dated 6 May 1675.

== Dams ==
In the early 20th century Jules-André Brillant (1888–1973), a local entrepreneur, formed the Compagnie de Pouvoir du Bas-Saint-Laurent (Lower Saint Lawrence Power Company). He found investors in Rimouski, purchased the Elsie Reford Falls and had a dam built above the falls. On 22 October 1922 the 2.75 MW turbine came into service. It was formally inaugurated in a ceremony on 1 July 1923 attended by various notables. The company grew into the largest power supplier in the region with a network of transmission lines serving Matane, Mont-Joli, Rimouski and beyond. A 3 MW turbine was added in 1930. The second dam, now called Mitis-2, was completed in 1947 below the first dam.

In 1963 the government of Quebec nationalized the production of electricity and created Hydro-Québec as a public utility, which took over management of the Mitis-1 and Mitis-2 dams. In 1965 a salmon capture station was installed at the foot of Mitis-2, with a system to transport the fish above the dams to a point about 12 kilometres (7.5 mi) upstream near the mouth of the Neigette River. With this change the salmon population grew rapidly from an estimated 20 fish in 1965 to 1,200 by 1992.

== Activities ==
The river is used for fishing, canoeing and swimming. Inflatable boats can be used to descend the river from the lake. The Parc de la Rivière Mitis is opposite the historical Jardins de Métis. The regional park has just over 3 kilometres (1.9 mi) of hiking trails. It also provides a dozen camping sites beside the Saint Lawrence.

== Fishing ==
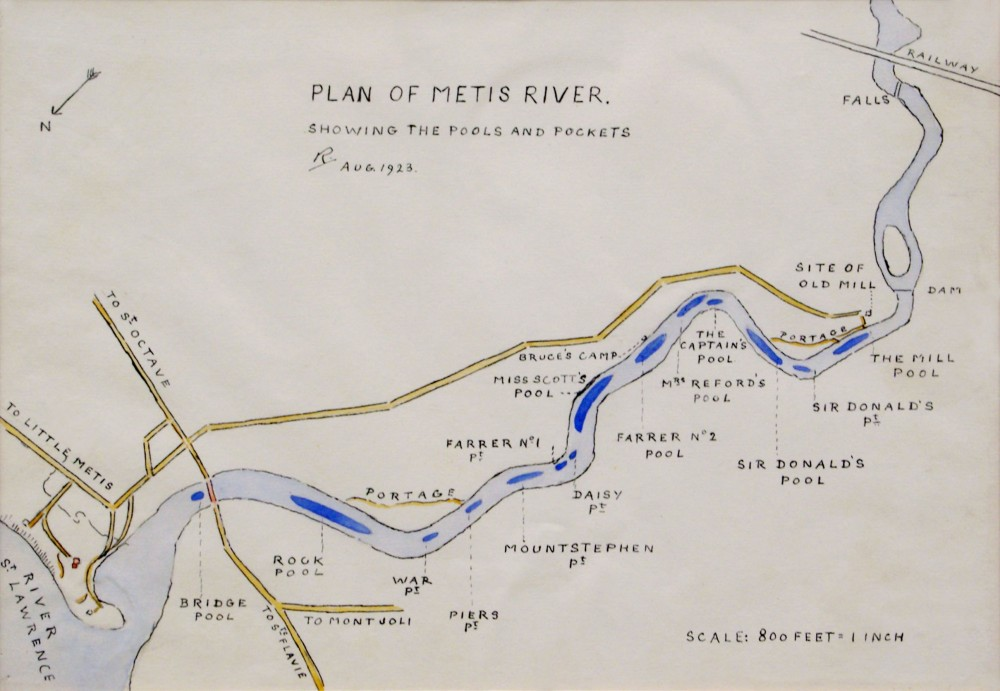
Map of the lower section of the river showing the pools and pockets (1923)

The river is one of 22 salmon rivers in the Gaspé Peninsula. Historians think that the Malécites / Maliseet Indians fished for eel and salmon at the mouth of the river, although they may not have had permanent villages. Fish are numerous, and include Atlantic salmon (Salmo salar), longnose dace (Rhinichthys cataractae), Eastern blacknose dace (Rhinichthys atratulus), slimy sculpin (Cottus cognatus), American eel (Anguilla rostrata) and brook trout (Salvelinus fontinalis). George Stephen, co-founder of the Canadian Pacific Railway, established the first fishing camp on the river in 1886. His niece Elsie Reford converted the camp into the Jardins de Métis. At that time salmon could only reach 4 kilometres (2.5 mi) upstream, where they were stopped by a 35 metres (115 ft) waterfall. Salmon were also affected until 1979 by logs being floated downstream.

The river was opened to the public for salmon fishing in 1977. In 1993 it became a ZEC (zone d'exploitation contrôlée: controlled use zone), Zec de la Rivière-Mitis, managed by the Mitis River Sport Fishing Management Corporation. There are three fishing areas, one private and the other two open to the public, with 33 pools, mostly fished with waders. The ZEC de la rivière Mitis covers about 20 kilometres (12 mi) of the river. Lake Mitis has a large population of lake trout (Salvelinus namaycush). Brook trout is found in Lake Mitis and in several water bodies and streams in the region.

In May 2015 the Ministry of Forests, Wildlife and Parks of Quebec announced a sport fishing catch-and-release program for large salmon on sixteen of Quebec's 118 salmon rivers. These were the Mitis, Laval, Pigou, Bouleau, aux Rochers, Jupitagon, Magpie, Saint-Jean, Corneille, Piashti, Watshishou, Little Watshishou, Nabisipi, Aguanish and Natashquan rivers. The Quebec Atlantic Salmon Federation said that the measures did not go nearly far enough in protecting salmon for future generations. In view of the rapidly declining Atlantic salmon population catch-and-release should have been implemented on all rivers apart from northern Quebec.

== Sources ==
- La centrale hydroélectrique de la rivière Mitis (in French), Musée virtuel du Canada
- "La rivière Mitis", GrandQuebec.com (in French)
- Parc régional de la rivière Mitis: Activités (in French), Parc régional de la rivière Mitis
- Quebec salmon need stronger preservation rules, association says, Montreal: CBC News, 10 May 2015
- Rivière Mitis (in French), Commission de toponymie du Québec
- "Rivière Mitis En Bref", Saumon Québec (in French)
- "ZEC Rivière Mitis", Virtual Museum of Canada (in French)
