= Aguanish, Quebec =

Aguanish
- Municipality
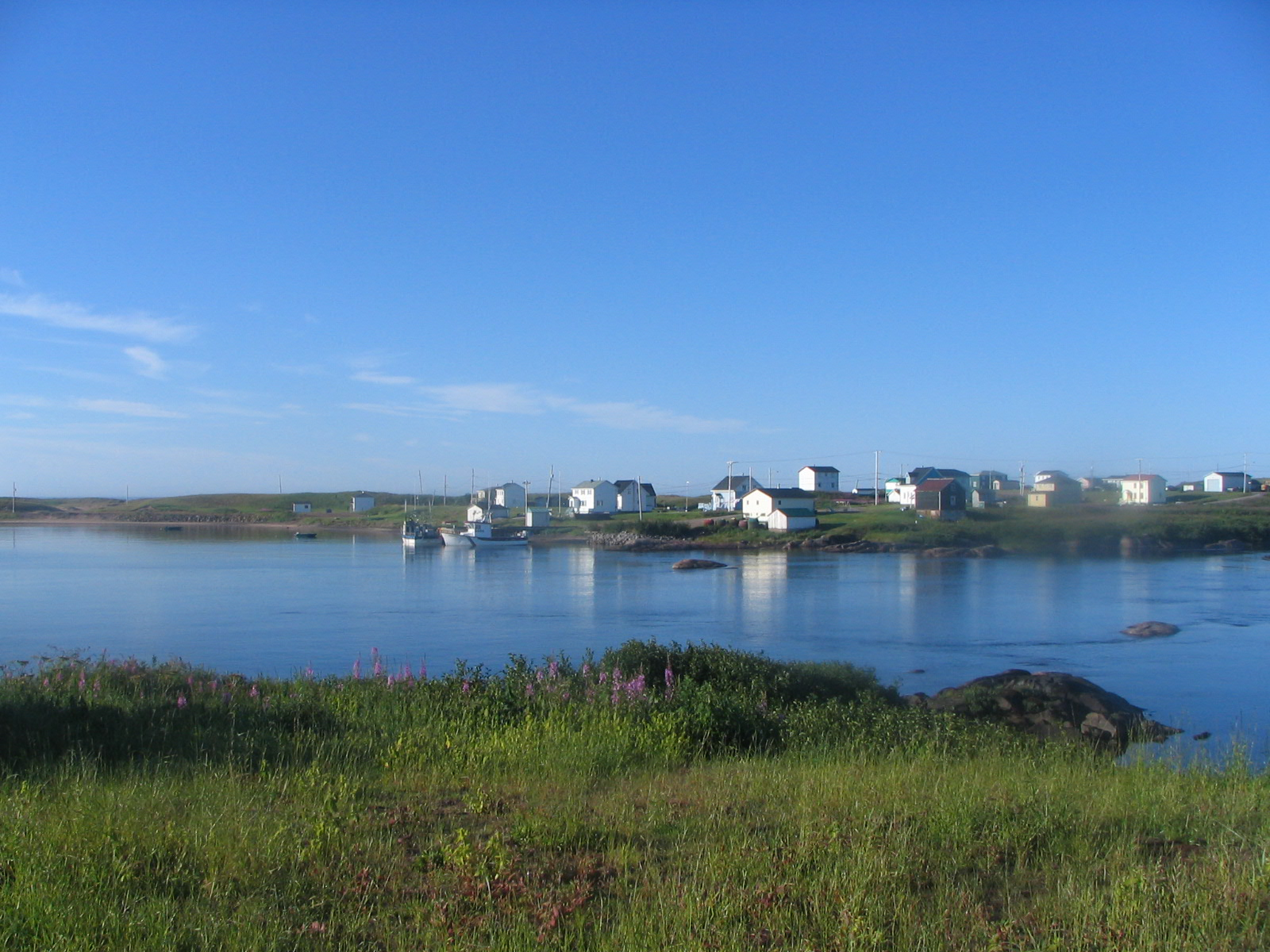
- River and Municipality

- Location in Côte-Nord region of Quebec
- Coordinates: 50°13′N 62°05′W
- Country: Canada
- Province: Quebec
- Region: Côte-Nord
- Regional county municipality: Minganie
- Settled: 1849
- Constituted: January 1, 1957

Government
  - Mayor: Léonard Labrie
  - Federal riding: Côte-Nord—Kawawachikamach—Nitassinan
  - Prov. riding: Duplessis

Area
  - Total: 680.61 km^{2} (262.78 sq mi)
  - Land: 532.04 km^{2} (205.42 sq mi)

Population (2021)
  - Total: 224
  - Density: 0.4/km^{2} (1.0/sq mi)
  - Pop (2016–21): ▼8.6%
  - Dwellings: 152
- Time zone: UTC-5 (Within the AST legislated time zone boundary but observes EST)
  - Summer (DST): UTC-4 (EDT)
- Postal code(s): G0G 1A0
- Area codes: 418 and 581
- Highways: R-138
- Website: www.aguanish.org

Aguanish is a municipality located in Côte-Nord region on the banks of the Aguanish River, on the north shore of Jacques Cartier Strait, in the Gulf of St. Lawrence, in Minganie Regional County Municipality, Quebec, Canada.

In addition to Aguanish itself, the municipality includes the hamlet of L'Île-Michon, 3.5 kilometres (2.2 mi) to the east.

Aguanish has barely 300 inhabitants, the Aguanishoises and Aguanishois live in one of the smallest municipalities in Quebec.

== Toponymy ==
Aguanish is named after the Goynish or Aguanish River (formerly Aguanus River), that flows through the village and drains into the Strait of Jacques Cartier of the Gulf of St. Lawrence. The word, of Innu origin, came from aguanus, in turn from akwanich, from the roots akwan (shelter) and ich (small). It has undergone many different spellings, including: Goines (17th century); Guanis, Goinis (1744 map by Bellin); Goynish (1776 map by Carver); Agwanus, Aguanus or Agouanus (maps of the 19th century).

== History ==
The main prehistoric cultures, called "archaic," were based on three sets of groups coming from the southwest, from as far away as the Great Lakes via the St. Lawrence River, those coming from the great plateaus of the interior and James Bay, and those from Newfoundland, Nova Scotia and New England.

From the 14th to the 17th century, the presence of Europeans in the regions of the North Shore and the Gulf of St. Lawrence began with the periodic visits of the Basques and Breton fishermen.

In 1831, the Hudson's Bay Company opened the Nabisipi trading post (also spelled Nabaysepie, Nabaysippi, or Nabaysipieat) at the mouth of the Nabisipi River (just west of the current town site). After a brief closure, it was reopened in 1832, and operated until circa 1860.

The first European inhabitants, fishermen from the Magdalen Islands, settled in the area circa 1849. They were joined in 1875 by people from Kégashka (today Kegaska) and from Nabisipi River. Until the advent of World War II (1939-1945) the growth of the population occurred in concert with the development of the pulp and paper industry.

The place was incorporated as a municipality in 1957.

== L'Île Michon ==
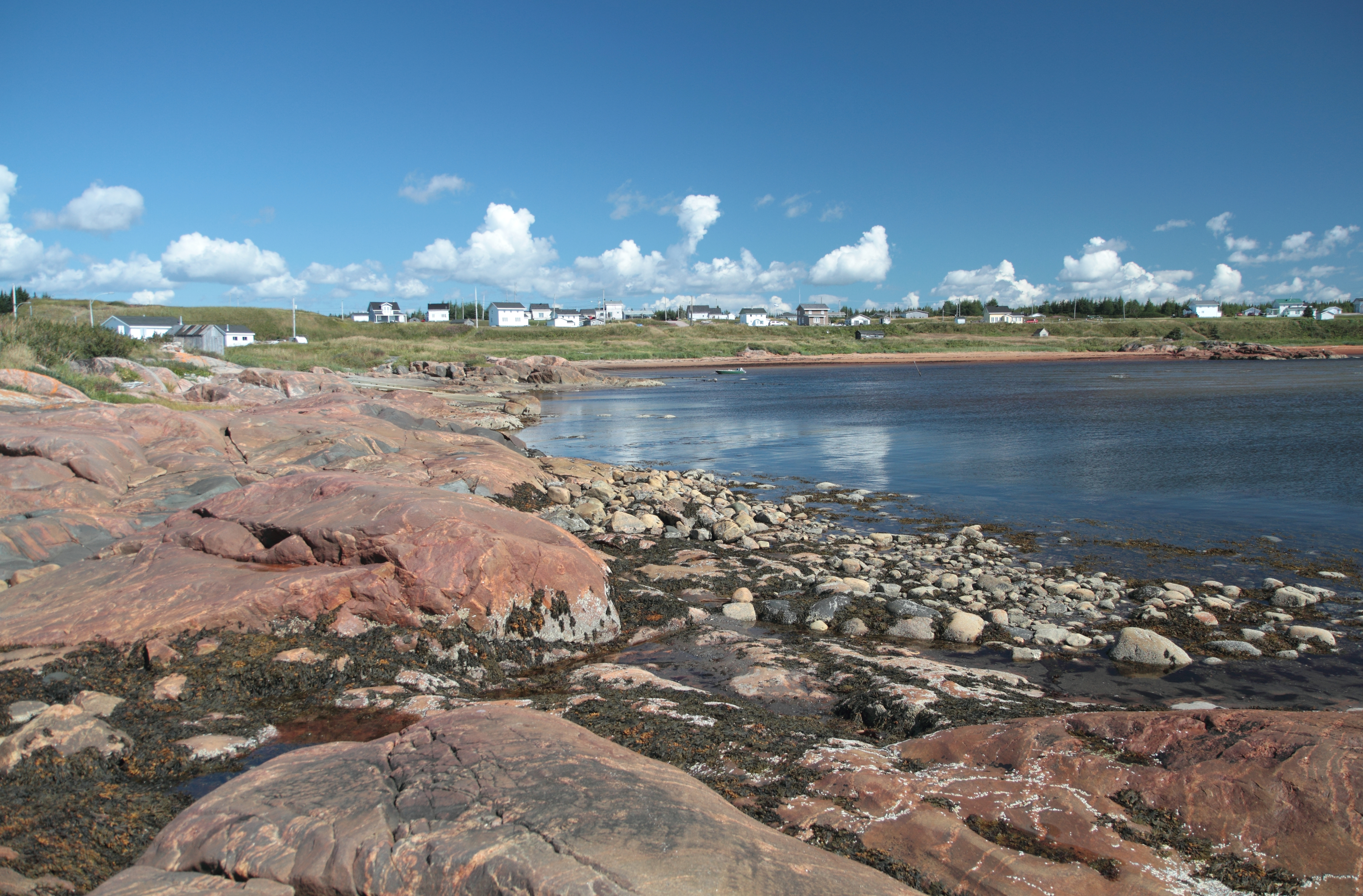
Coastline, rocky base and beach of L'Île-Michon

The hamlet of L'Île Michon is located opposite the island of the same name, 700 metres (2,300 ft) from the coast and 3.5 kilometres (2.2 mi) downstream from Aguanish, on the coast of the Jacques Cartier Strait, in the Gulf of St. Lawrence.

According to certains sources, Île-Michon was founded by Jean Michon, a craftsman who landed on the island opposite the village to build fishing boats.

== Demographics ==
=== Population ===
Canada census – Aguanish community profile

	2021	2016	2011
Population	224 (-8.6% from 2016)	245 (-11.9% from 2011)	278 (-8.3% from 2006)
Land area	532.04 km^{2} (205.42 sq mi)	586.40 km^{2} (226.41 sq mi)	600.61 km^{2} (231.90 sq mi)
Population density	0.4/km^{2} (1.0/sq mi)	0.4/km^{2} (1.0/sq mi)	0.5/km^{2} (1.3/sq mi)
Median age	59.6 (M: 59.6, F: 59.6)	54.1 (M: 56.0, F: 52.8)	49.7 (M: 51.4, F: 48.3)
Private dwellings	152 (total) 119 (occupied)	148 (total)	145 (total)
Median household income	$N/A	$55,936	$N/A

Notes: 2021 and 2011 income data for this area has been suppressed for data quality or confidentiality reasons.
References: 2021 2016 2011

Historical Census Data - Aguanish, Quebec

Year	Pop.	±%
1961	560	—
1966	638	+13.9%
1971	550	−13.8%
1976	530	−3.6%
1981	487	−8.1%
1986	408	−16.2%
1991	402	−1.5%

Year	Pop.	±%
1996	380	−5.5%
2001	343	−9.7%
2006	303	−11.7%
2011	278	−8.3%
2016	245	−11.9%
2021	224	−8.6%

Source: Statistics Canada

=== Language ===
Canada Census Mother Tongue - Aguanish, Quebec
Census	Total	French			English			French & English			Other		
Year	Responses	Count	Trend	Pop %	Count	Trend	Pop %	Count	Trend	Pop %	Count	Trend	Pop %
2016	245	240	▼12.7%	98.0%	0	▼100.0%	0.0%	0	0.0%	0.0%	5	▲ n/a%	2.0%
2011	280	275	▼5.2%	98.2%	5	▲ n/a%	1.8%	0	0.0%	0.0%	0	▼100.0%	0.0%
2006	300	290	▼13.4%	96.7%	0	0.0%	0.0%	0	0.0%	0.0%	10	▲ n/a%	3.3%
2001	335	335	▼10.7%	100.0%	0	0.0%	0.0%	0	0.0%	0.0%	0	0.0%	0.0%
1996	375	375	n/a	100.0%	0	n/a	0.0%	0	n/a	0.0%	0	n/a	0.0%

== Economy ==
Economic activity primarily centers on crab and salmon fishing.

== Transportation ==
By Route 138, according to Google Map, Aguanish is 125 kilometres (78 mi) from Havre-Saint-Pierre and 341 kilometres (212 mi) from Sept-Îles.

Until the arrival of The Whale Route (Route 138) in 1996, a regular means of access to the area was the boat service maintained during the navigation season by Clarke Steamship Company, Ltd, sailing from Montreal and Quebec. Also, numerous lakes of the area provide suitable landings for floatplane based at Mingan and Havre-Saint-Pierre. Canoe travel is difficult in the region and require several portages.

== See also ==
- Aguanish River
- List of municipalities in Quebec
