= Pontbriand River =

River in Côte-Nord, Quebec, Canada

Pontbriand River Former name Ruisseau Kapminau
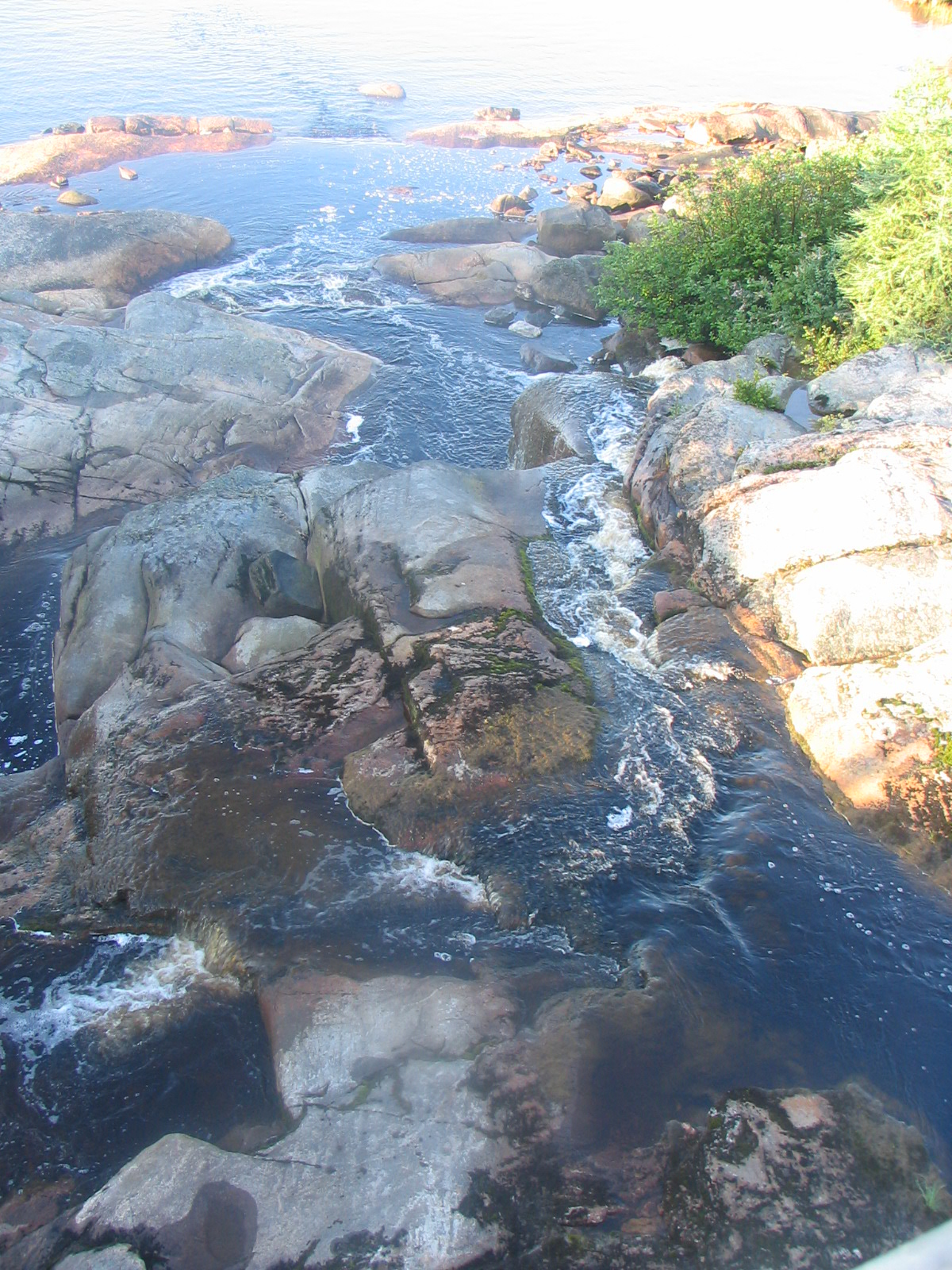
- Flows on the rock of Canadian shield, from Route 138

Location
- Country: Canada
- Province: Quebec
- Region: Côte-Nord
- RCM: Minganie
- Municipalities: Baie-Johan-Beetz and Aguanish

Physical characteristics
- Mouth: Gulf of St. Lawrence
  - coordinates: 50°16′56″N 62°33′05″W
- Length: 15 km (9.3 mi)

Pontbriand River is a river located on the north shore of the Gulf of St. Lawrence, in the Côte-Nord region, Minganie RCM, Quebec, Canada.

== Toponymy ==
Kapminau the old name of the river, designating small birds in Innu language, of which:

- Perisoreus canadensis. — Mésangeai du Canada, Geai du Canada, Geai gris. — (Canada Jay, Canada Jay, Gray Jay, Canada Jay, Gray Jay, Gray Jay, Camp Robber or Whiskey Jack).

The actual name of the River, the Bay and the Pontbriand Lookout recalls Claude de Pontbriand, a member of Jacques Cartier's crew, during his second voyage in 1535. The Pontbriand River lookout offers a parking area, an access trail to the lookout, rest and observation areas, picnic tables, etc.

Pontbriand: River - Bay - Lookout

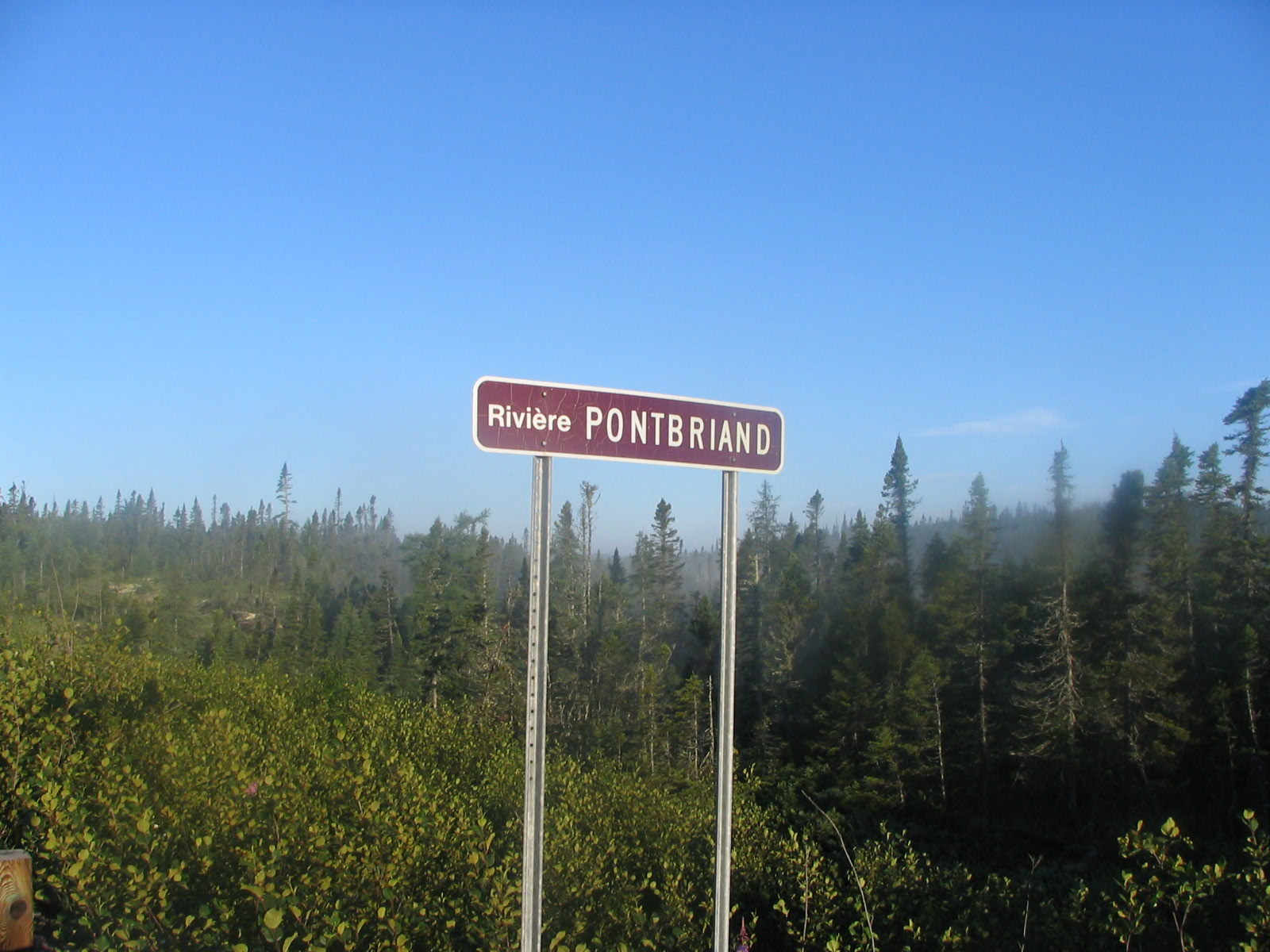
Sign on The Whale Road (Route 138)

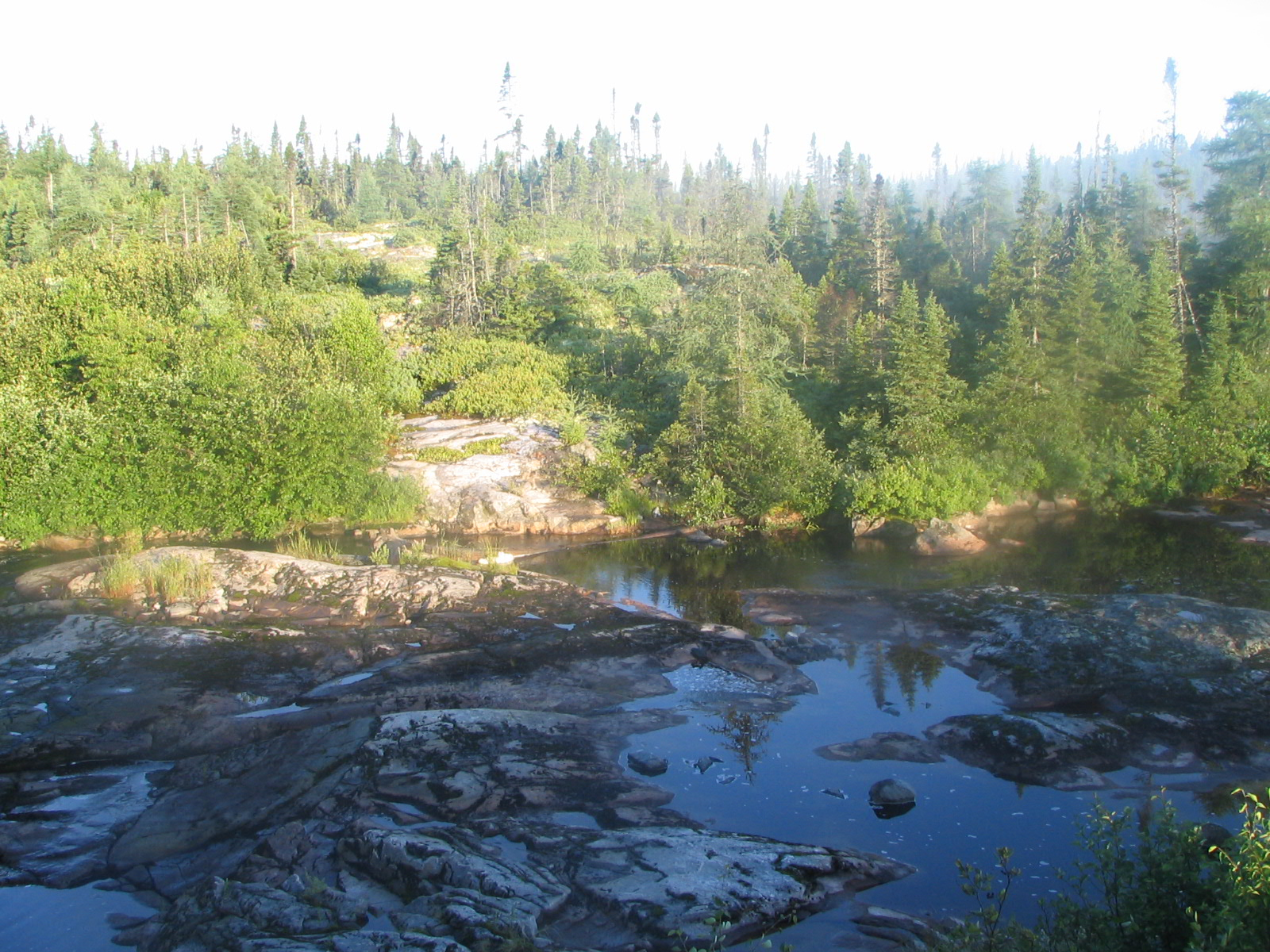
River, rocky outcrop of the Canadian Shield

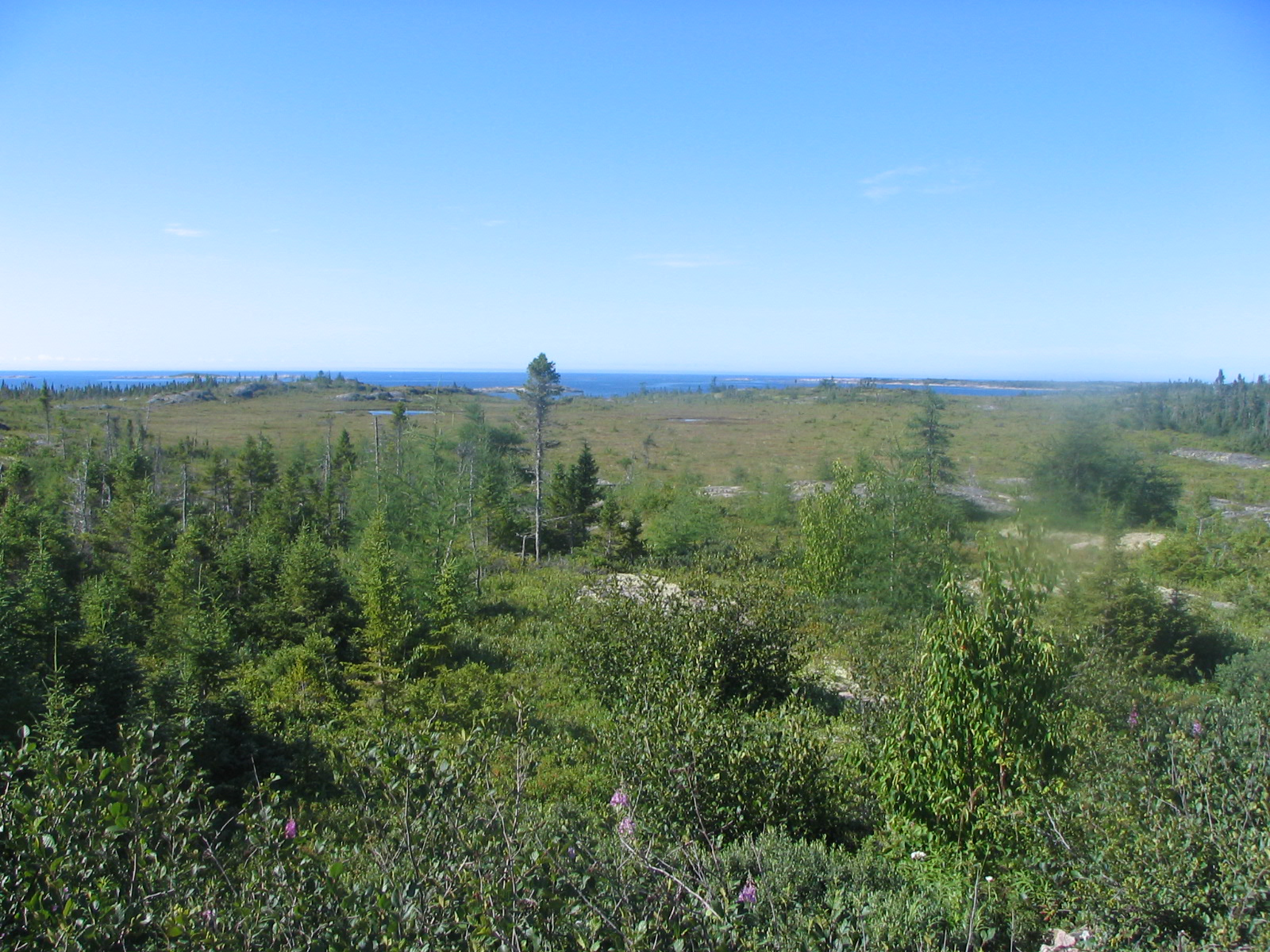
Bay in Gulf of St. Lawrence

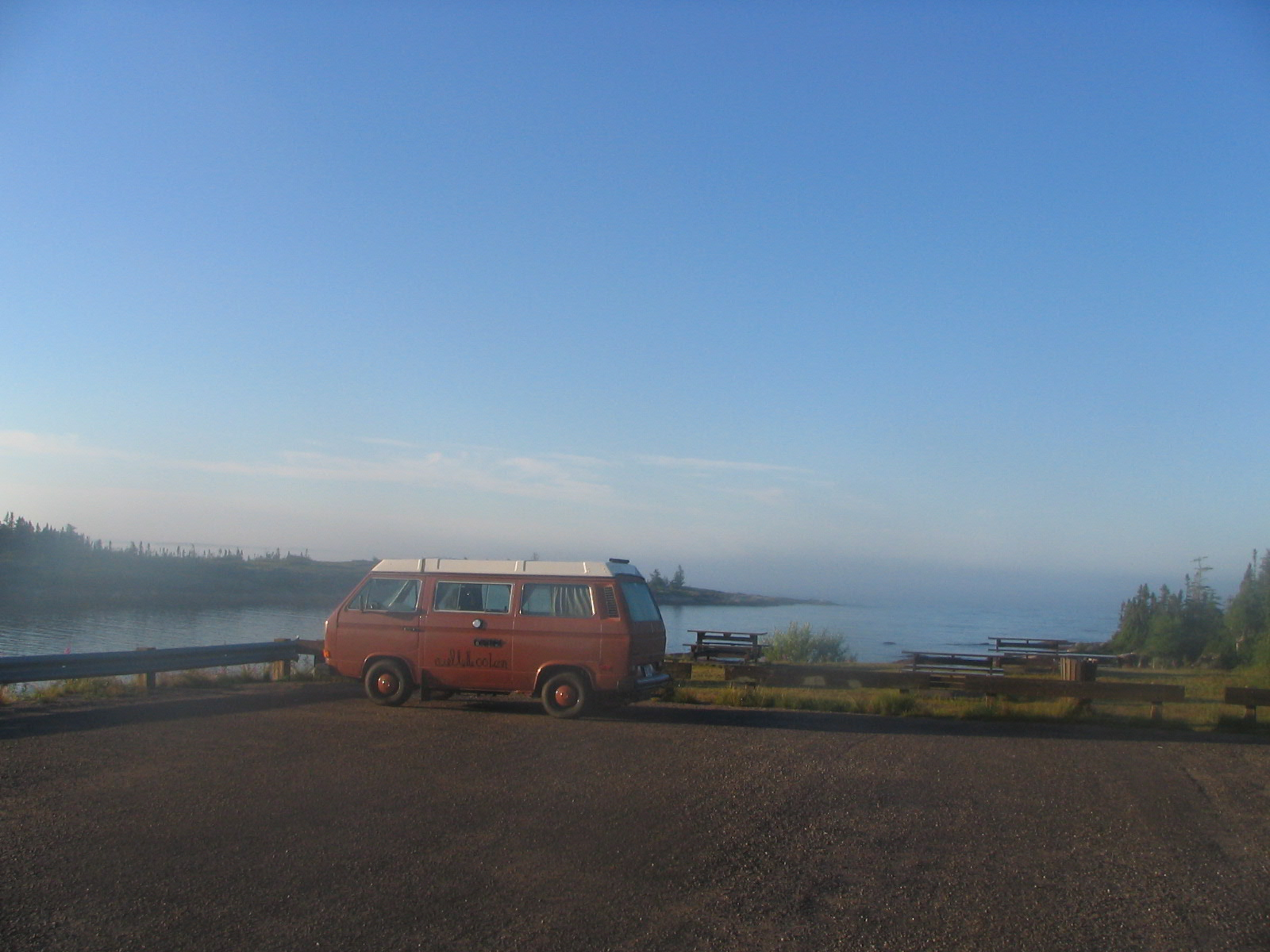
Lookout, picnic and rest area on Route 138

== Territory ==
The Pontbriand river flows through the territories of the municipalities of Baie-Johan-Beetz and Aguanish, for approximately 15 km.

== Watshishou migratory bird sanctuary ==
The Wastishou Migratory Bird Sanctuary includes Pontbriand, Jalobert and Pashashibou bays, all islands, islets and emerging rocks in the area, as well as the offshore waters over a distance of several kilometers from the coast. In fact, the waters cover almost 90% of the refuge's surface area. Vegetation is limited to a few species of moss and lichens, because the terrestrial part of the refuge is mainly made up of rocky outcrops.

Overview of Wastishou Migratory Bird Sanctuary

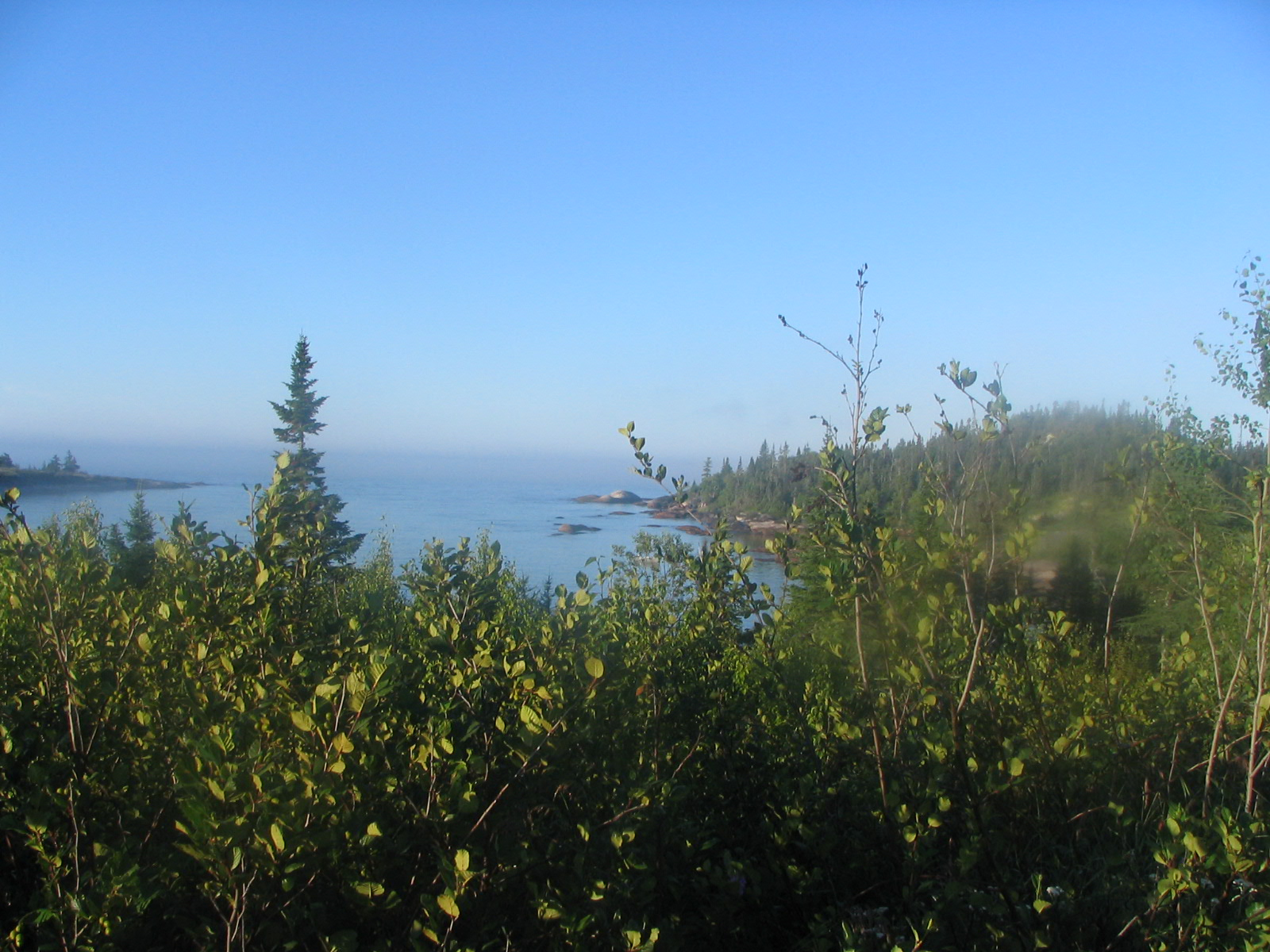
Mouth of the Pontbriand River, in Pontbriand Bay, in Gulf of St. Lawrence

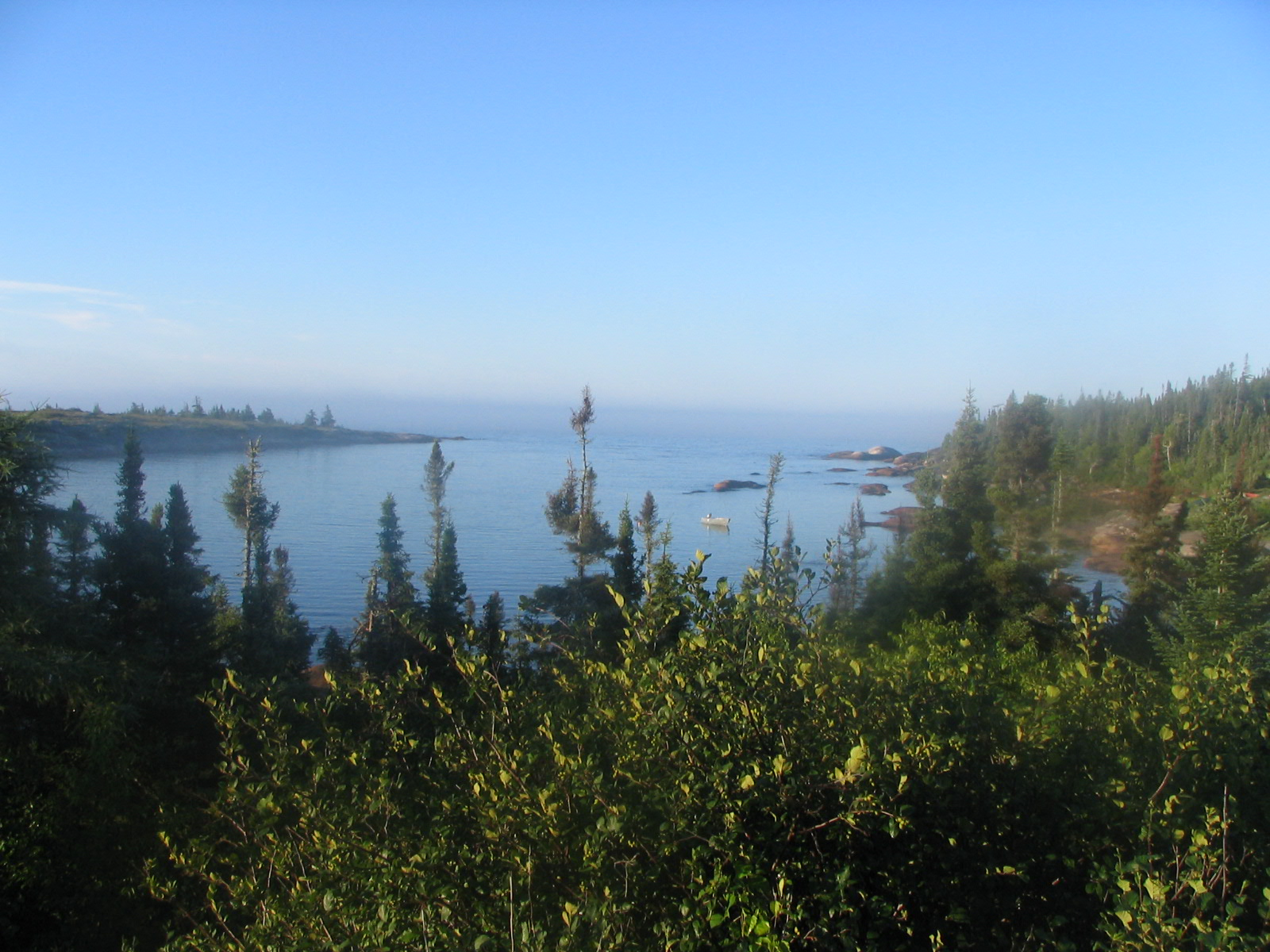
Mouth of the Pontbriand River, some 20 km east in Baie-Johan-Beetz (Municipality)
