= Véronique River =

Véronique River Rivière Véronique
- Location within Quebec

Location
- Country: Canada
- Province: Quebec
- Region: Côte-Nord
- RCM: Minganie

Physical characteristics
- Mouth: Gulf of Saint Lawrence
  - coordinates: 50.3108333°N 62.7033333°W
  - elevation: 0 metres (0 ft)
- Length: 9 kilometres (5.6 mi)
- Basin size: 111 square kilometres (43 sq mi)

The Véronique River (French: Rivière Véronique) is a river in the Côte-Nord region of the province of Quebec, Canada. It flows into the Gulf of Saint Lawrence, opposite to Anticosti Island.

== Location ==
The Véronique River drains Lake Véronique and Little Lake Véronique. It flows for about 9 kilometres (5.6 mi) from Lake Véronique at its mouth. The mouth of the river is in the municipality of Baie-Johan-Beetz in Minganie Regional County Municipality. The river enters the Gulf of Saint Lawrence in the northeast of the Baie Quetchou, just east of the Baie Johan-Beetz. The Quetachou River enters the northwest of the same bay. The bay is about 65 kilometres (40 mi) east of Havre-Saint-Pierre.

== Basin ==
The river basin covers 111 square kilometres (43 sq mi). It lies between the basins of the Watshishou River to the east and the Quetachou River to the west. It includes part of the unorganized territory of Lac-Jérôme as well as part of Baie-Johan-Beetz. The river has low volume and the current is slow. Donat Devost and his sons set up a sawmill on the Véronique River around 1953. Six years later the mill was sold to Lorenzo Tanguay. In 1969 Tanguay moved the sawmill to Lac Salé and closed the business.

== Environment ==
A map of the ecological regions of Quebec shows the river in sub-regions 6j-T and 6m-T of the east spruce/moss subdomain. The north of the Véronique valley has potential for use by moose (Alces alces), and traces of moose were found in the region in 1978 and 1979. Beaver (Castor canadensis) is well represented in the river basin. The Véronique River has low potential for Canada goose (Branta canadensis) and average potential for surface ducks and diving ducks.

== Fish ==
The river is used by Atlantic salmon (Salmo salar), brook trout (Salvelinus fontinalis) and American eel (Anguilla rostrata). Atlantic tomcod (Microgadus tomcod) has also been reported. It is narrow, its bed is littered with trees and the vegetation along its course is dense, so it is not attractive for sport fishing. It is not officially a salmon river, and does not have the physical characteristics preferred by salmon. The bed of the river is clay and mud along almost its entire length. However, juvenile salmon were found in samples in 1980 and 1984, so there must be some good spawning areas.

== Sources ==
- Division du contrôle de la pollution et recherches (22 April 1985), Evaluation environnementale, Ponts et ponceaux Route 138 (PDF) (in French), Service de l'Environnement
- Dumont, Jean (June 1986), Prolongement de la route 138 entre Baie Johan-Beetz et la Rivière Pashashibou (PDF) (in French), Gouvernement du Québec, Ministère des Transports, Service de I'Environnement
- Plan d’action municipal - MICA (PDF) (in French), CLD Minganie
- Portrait préliminaire de la zone de gestion intégrée de l'eau par bassin versant Duplessis (PDF) (in French), OBV Duplessis, April 2015, archived from the original (PDF) on 2019-09-02
- Rivière Véronique (in French), Commission de toponymie du Québec
- Rivière Véronique (in French), Ressources naturelles Canada
- Saucier, J.-P.; Robitaille, A.; Grondin, P.; Bergeron, J.-F.; Gosselin, J. (2011), Les régions écologiques du Québec méridional (PDF) (map), 4 (in French), Ministère des Ressources naturelles et de la Faune, archived from the original (PDF) on 2020-06-19
