= Quetachou River =

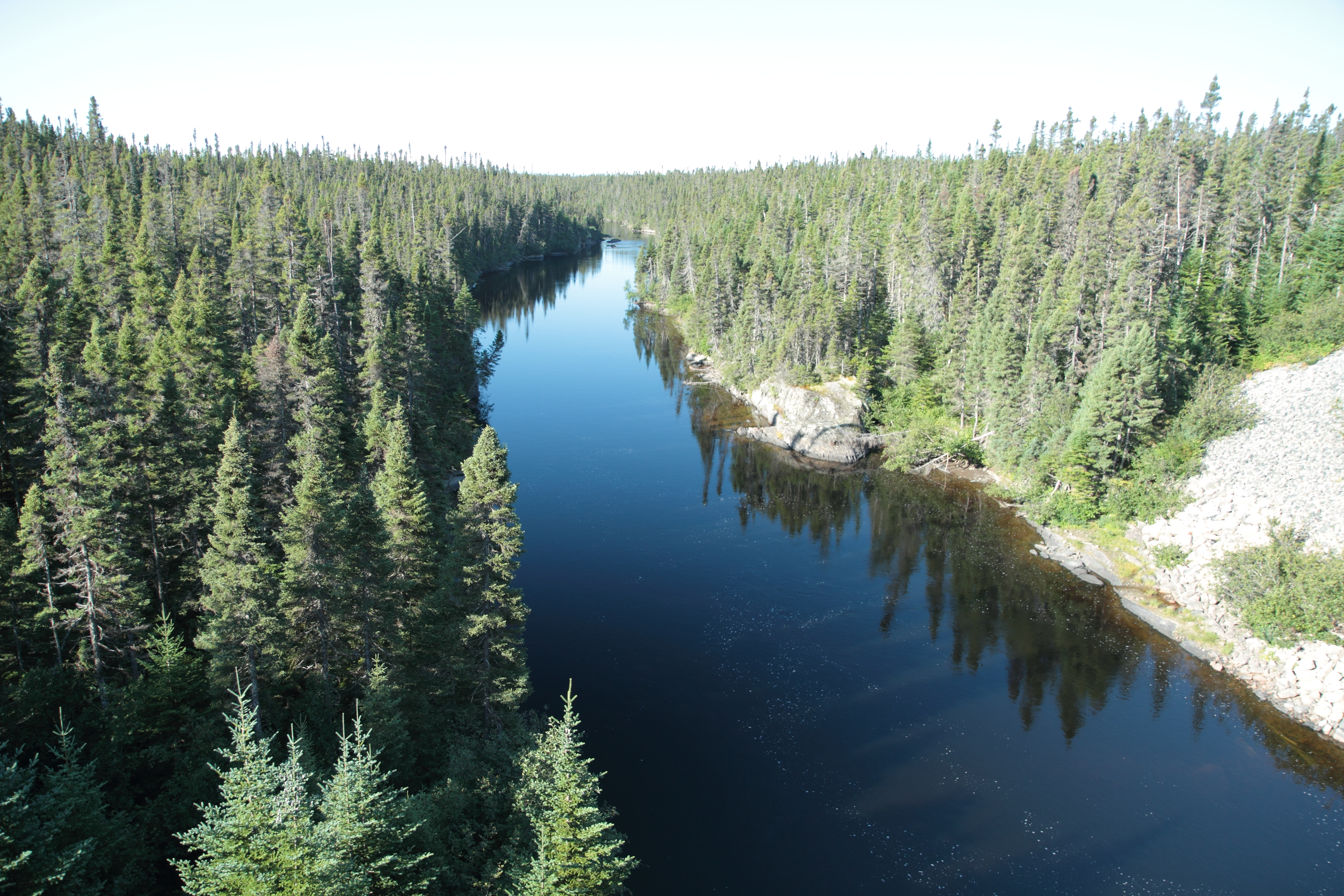
- The river mouth from Quebec Route 138

- Location within Quebec

Location
- Country: Canada
- Province: Quebec
- Region: Côte-Nord
- RCM: Minganie

Physical characteristics
- Source: Lac de la Robe Noire
- Mouth: Gulf of Saint Lawrence
  - coordinates: 50.3102778°N 62.7238889°W
  - elevation: 0 metres (0 ft)
- Basin size: 1,017 square kilometres (393 sq mi)

The Quetachou River (French: Rivière Quetachou) is a river in the Côte-Nord region of the province of Quebec, Canada. It empties into the Gulf of Saint Lawrence.

== Location ==
The Quetachou River rises above Lac de la Robe Noire, which drains Lac François and Lac Gendron. It enters the Baie Quetachou from the northwest. The Veronique River enters the bay from the northeast. The mouth of the river is in the municipality of Baie-Johan-Beetz in the Minganie Regional County Municipality. The origin of the name is not known. It was made official on 5 December 1968.

A footpath runs along the river about 10 kilometres (6.2 mi) from the village of Baie-Johan-Beetz, leading to the chutes Quétachou, a section of waterfalls. In the summer of 2013 the forests to the north of the village were burned by a forest fire, including those along the footpath. Two years later a TV show featured the work of nine artists on restoring the beauty of the trail. The work, titled Quétachou : résilience du territoire (Quétachou: resilience of the territory) was helped by several members of the local community. The semi-permanent works installed in the forest will gradually deteriorate as nature regenerates.

== Basin ==
The Quetachou River basin is partially in the unorganized territory of Lac-Jérôme and partially in the municipality of Baie-Johan-Beetz. The basin covers 1,017 square kilometres (393 sq mi), and lies between the basins of the Piashti River and the Véronique River. Lakes in the watershed include Lac Uhu, Lacs de la Cabane Brûlée, Lac Devost, Lac Croche, Lac Bellanger, Lac Napoléon, Lac Beetz, Lac Noroy, Lac de la Robe Noire, Lac François and Lac Gendron. A map of the ecological regions of Quebec shows the river in sub-regions 6j-T and 6m-T of the east spruce/moss subdomain.

=== Lac de la Robe Noire ===
Lac de la Robe Noire (Black Robe Lake) drains Lac François and Lac Gendron. It is drained by the Quetachou River, which flows through lakes Beaulieu and Beetz to the Gulf. The lake is 16 kilometres (9.9 mi) long and 4 kilometres (2.5 mi) wide. It has many islands, and its shore includes several peninsulas. According to the surveyor Hould (1899) the lake is full of trout, and is near the source of the large river Piasthibaie (Piashti River). The Club Lac de la Robe Noire has exclusive fishing rights as an outfitter.

The 1914 Dictionary of Rivers and Lakes of the Province of Quebec said the name was recent and referred to Catholic missionaries who came to catechise the Innu. Often missionaries were the first Europeans to visit the region. They were called "black robes" (robes noires) after their long black soutances. The Innu language name for the lake is Matnipi, or "Bad Lake".

=== Lac Bellanger ===
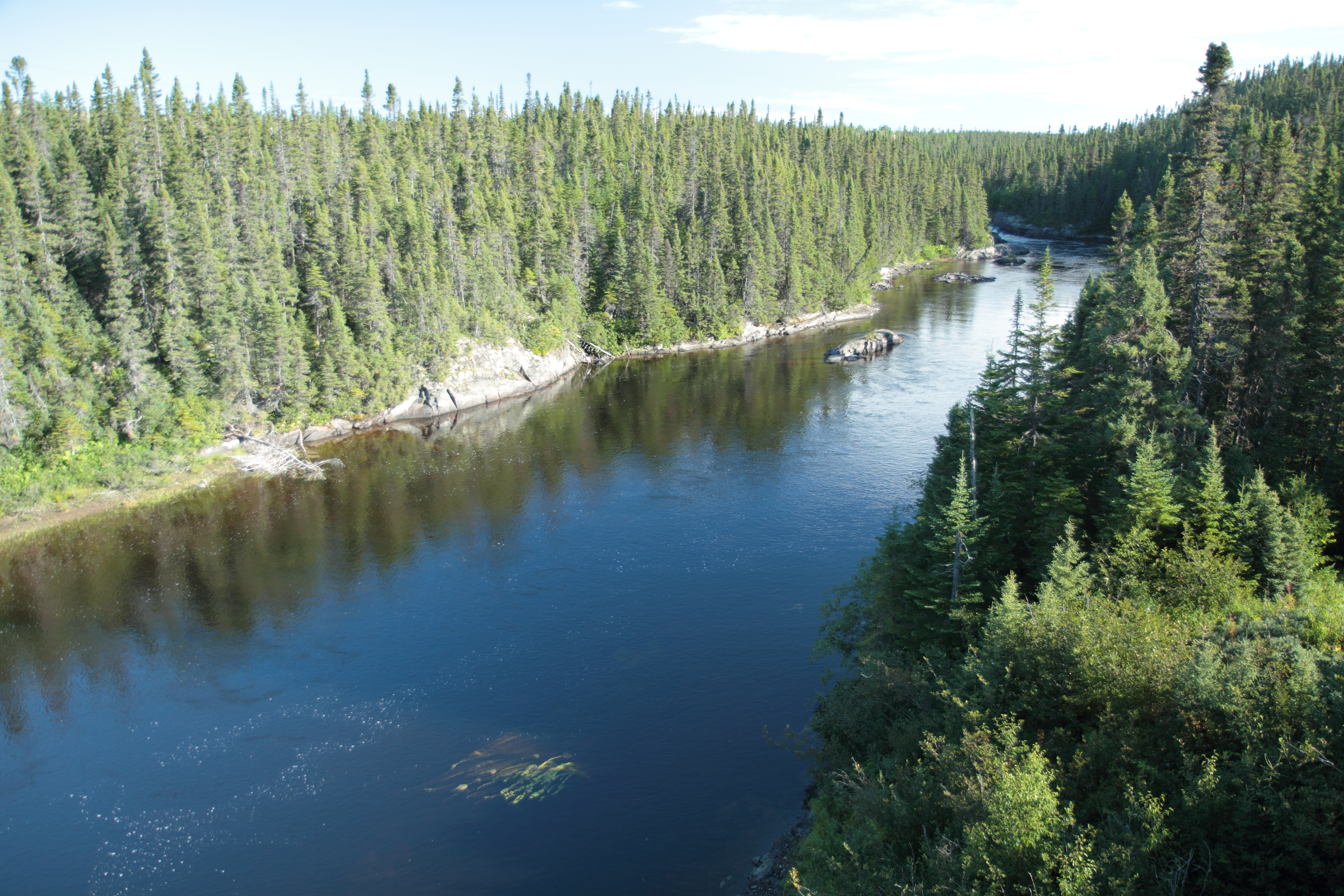
Looking north from Route 138

Lac Bellanger is a large, bay-like widening of the Quetachou River 20 kilometres (12 mi) north of the river's estuary. It is fed by the Bellanger River. The lake has a very irregular shape, and covers 14 square kilometres (5.4 sq mi). It is named after the Abbé Joseph-Marie Bellanger, grand vicar of the bishop of Newfoundland, missionary in La Tabatière, a village of the Basse-Côte-Nord and author of a Grammar of the Mi'kmaq language (1864). The Innu call the lake Pepaukamau, or lake with several straits.

=== Lacs de la Cabane Brûlée ===
The Lacs de la Cabane Brûlée (Burnt Cabin Lakes) are to the west of the Quetachou River. They would be named after a cabin that burned on the edge of one of the lakes. They are also known as the Lacs Brûlé (Burnt Lakes).

=== Lac Noroy ===
Lac Noroy is named after Jean Bochart de Champigny (d. 1720), Lord of Noroy and Verneuil, sixth intendant of New France (1686-1702).

== Sources ==
- Lac Bellanger (in French), Commission de toponymie du Québec
- Lacs de la Cabane Brûlée (in French), Commission de toponymie du Québec
- Lac de la Robe Noire (in French), Commission de toponymie du Québec
- Lac Noroy (in French), Commission de toponymie du Québec
- "Lacs de la Côte-Nord", Grand Quebec
- Le sentier Quétachou renaît de ses cendres à Baie-Johan-Beetz (in French), Tele-Quebec, 21 August 2015
- Panache Art Actuel présente : Quétachou, exposition jusqu’au 4 septembre au Musée régional de la Côte-Nord (in French), Panache Art Actuel, 23 June 2016, archived from the original on 2024-12-01
- Portrait préliminaire de la zone de gestion intégrée de l'eau par bassin versant Duplessis (PDF) (in French), OBV Duplessis, April 2015, archived from the original (PDF) on 2019-09-02
- ""Quétachou : résilience du territoire": Une expérience enlevante vécue par neuf artistes nord-côtiers", Nord-Côtier (in French), 19 August 2015
- Rivière Quetachou (in French), Commission de toponymie du Québec
- Rivière Quetachou, Natural Resources Canada
- Rouillard, Eugène (1914), "Pashashibou, (Rivière)", Dictionnaire des rivières et lacs de la province de Québec (in French), Québec. Département des terres et forêts
- Saucier, J.-P.; Robitaille, A.; Grondin, P.; Bergeron, J.-F.; Gosselin, J. (2011), Les régions écologiques du Québec méridional (PDF) (map), 4 (in French), Ministère des Ressources naturelles et de la Faune, archived from the original (PDF) on 2020-06-19
