= Watshishou Migratory Bird Sanctuary =

Important Bird Area of Canada

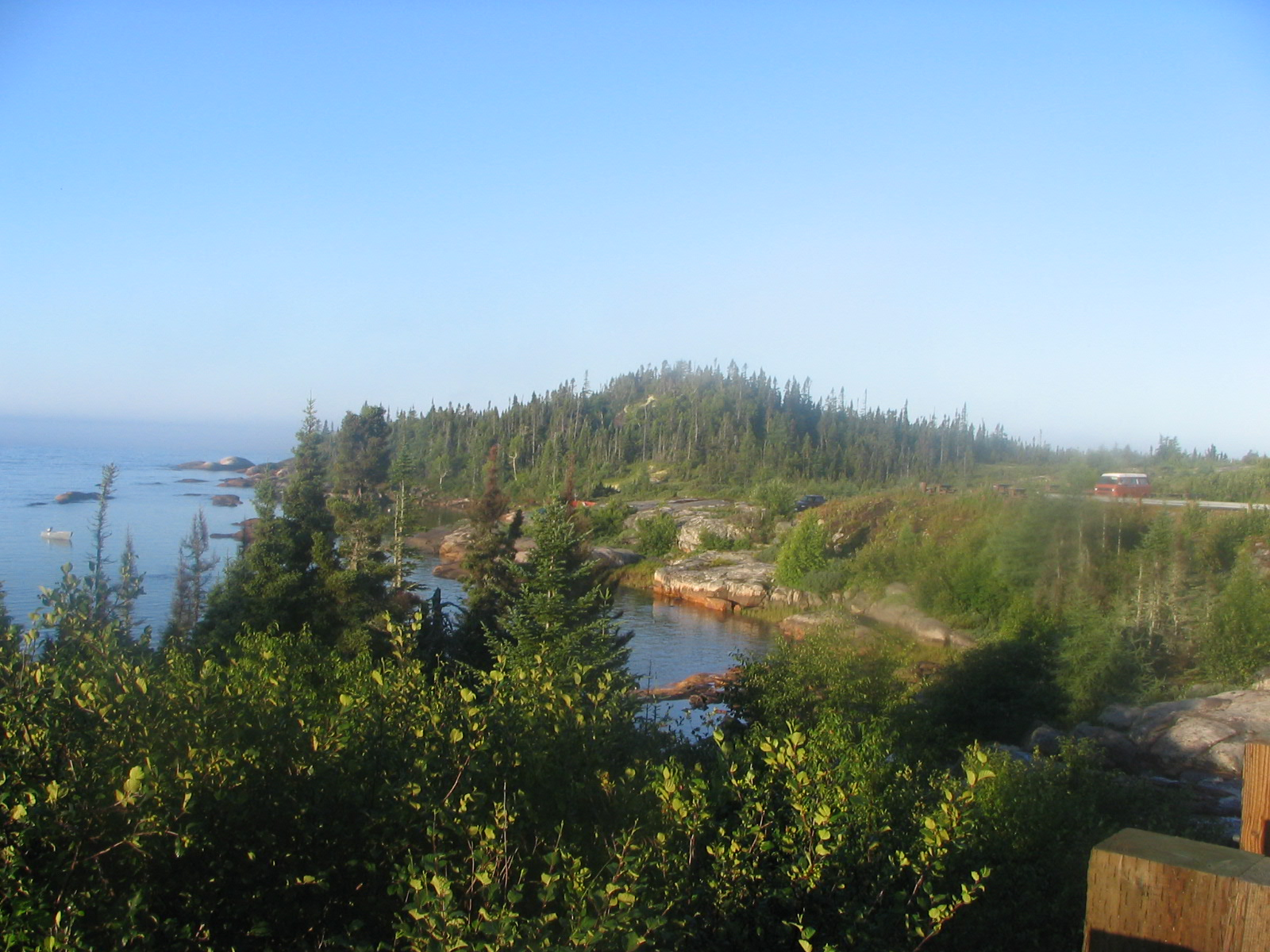
- Mouth of the Pontbriand River, Gulf of St. Lawrence, Belvédère de la Baie-Ponbriand, roadside rest stop from Route 138 (The Whale Route)
- Interactive map of Watshishou Migratory Bird Sanctuary
- Nearest town: Natashquan
- Coordinates: 50°15′0″N 62°28′50″W
- Website: https://www.canada.ca/en/environment-climate-change/services/migratory-bird-sanctuaries/locations/watshishou.html

Watshishou Migratory Bird Sanctuary, an Important Bird and Biodiversity Area of Canada, is located on the north shore of the Gulf of St. Lawrence, in the Côte-Nord region, Minganie RCM, Quebec, Canada.

== Territory ==
Located approximately 40 kilometers west of Natashquan, this 10,673 hectare refuge extends over a little more than 23 kilometers along the coast of the Gulf of St. Lawrence, in the municipality of Baie-Johan-Beetz, and partly in Aguanish and the Mingan Archipelago National Park reserve.

The Wastishou Migratory Bird Sanctuary includes Pontbriand, Jalobert and Pashashibou bays, all islands, islets and emerging rocks in the area, as well as the offshore waters over a distance of several kilometers from the coast. In fact, the waters cover almost 90% of the refuge's surface area. Vegetation is limited to a few species of moss and lichens, because the terrestrial part of the refuge is mainly made up of rocky outcrops.

=== Birds ===
The common eider is the most abundant, the double-crested cormorant is the second most commonly found species, the third most numerous species within this sanctuary is the herring gull.

- Somateria mollissima. — Eider à duvet. — (Common eider).
- Phalacrocorax auritus. — Cormoran à aigrettes. — (Double-crested cormorant).
- Larus argentatus. — Goéland argenté. — (Herring gull).

Bird species present in smaller numbers also benefit from this sanctuary:

- ''Sterna paradisaea. — Sterne arctique. — (Arctic tern).
- Sterna hirundo. — Sterne pierregarin. — (Common tern).
- Gavia stellata. — Plongeon catmarin. — (Red-throated loon).
- Gavia immer. — Plongeon huard. — (Common loon).
- Anas rubripes. — Canard noir. — (American black duck).
- Mergus serrator. — Harle huppé. — (Red-breasted merganser).
- Melanitta deglandi. — Macreuse à ailes blanches. — (White-winged scoter).
- Melanitta perspicillata. — Macreuse à front blanc ou Macreuse à lunettes. — (Surf scoter).
- Melanitta americana. — Macreuse à bec jaune. — (Black scoter).
Wastishou Migratory Bird Sanctuary

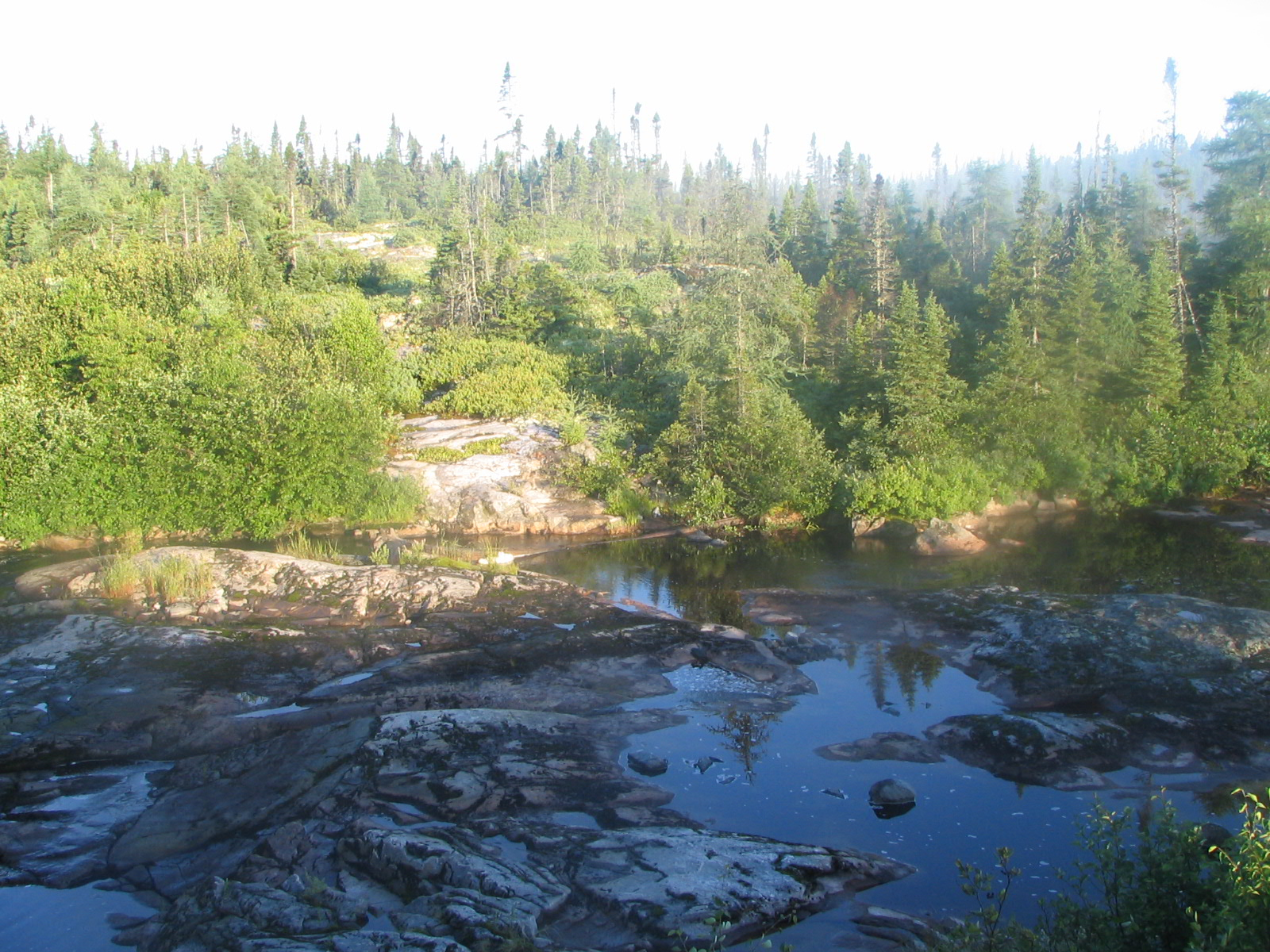
Pontbriand River, rocky outcrop of the Canadian Shield

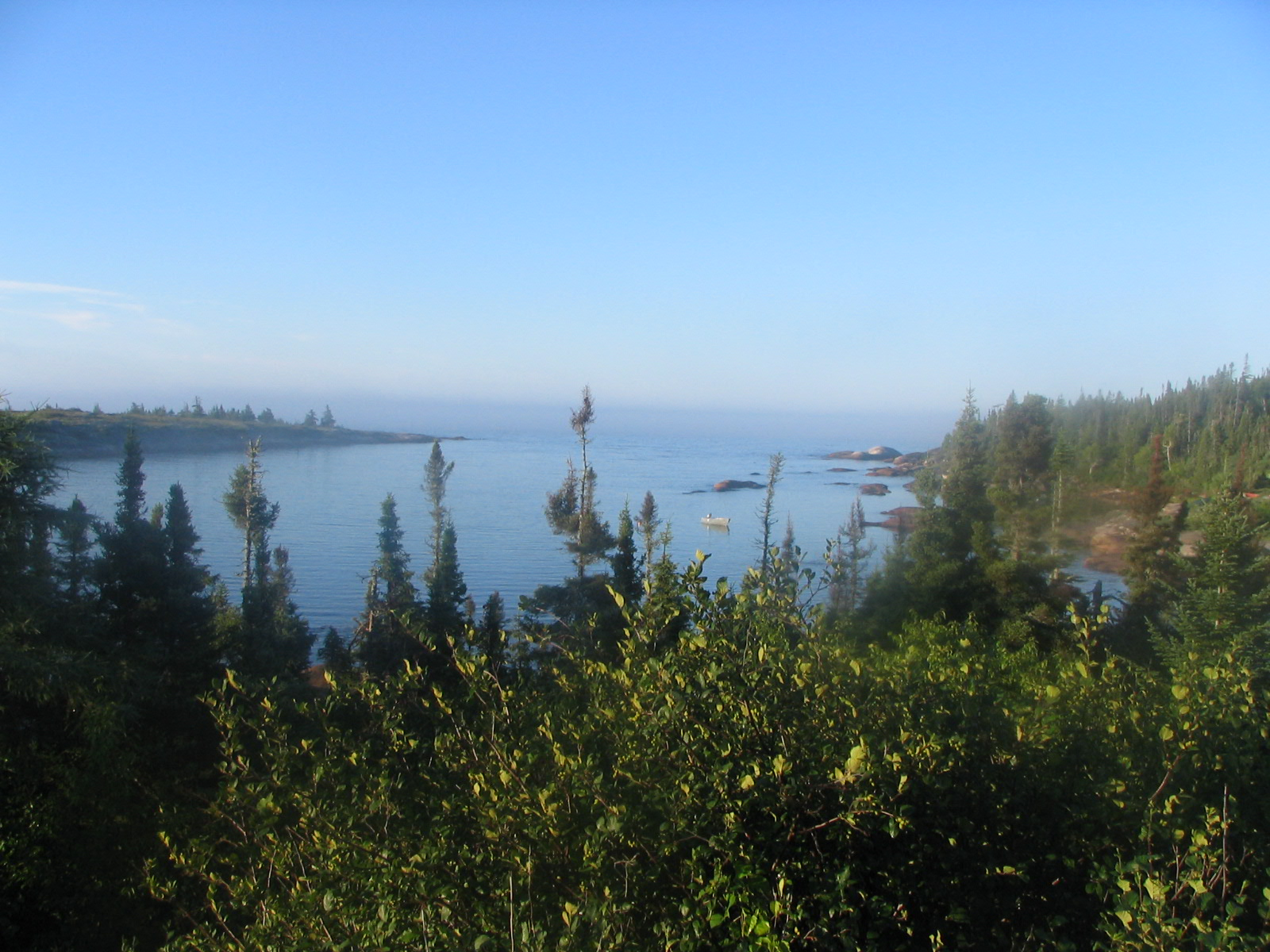
Mouth of the Pontbriand River, some 20 km east in Baie-Johan-Beetz (Municipality)

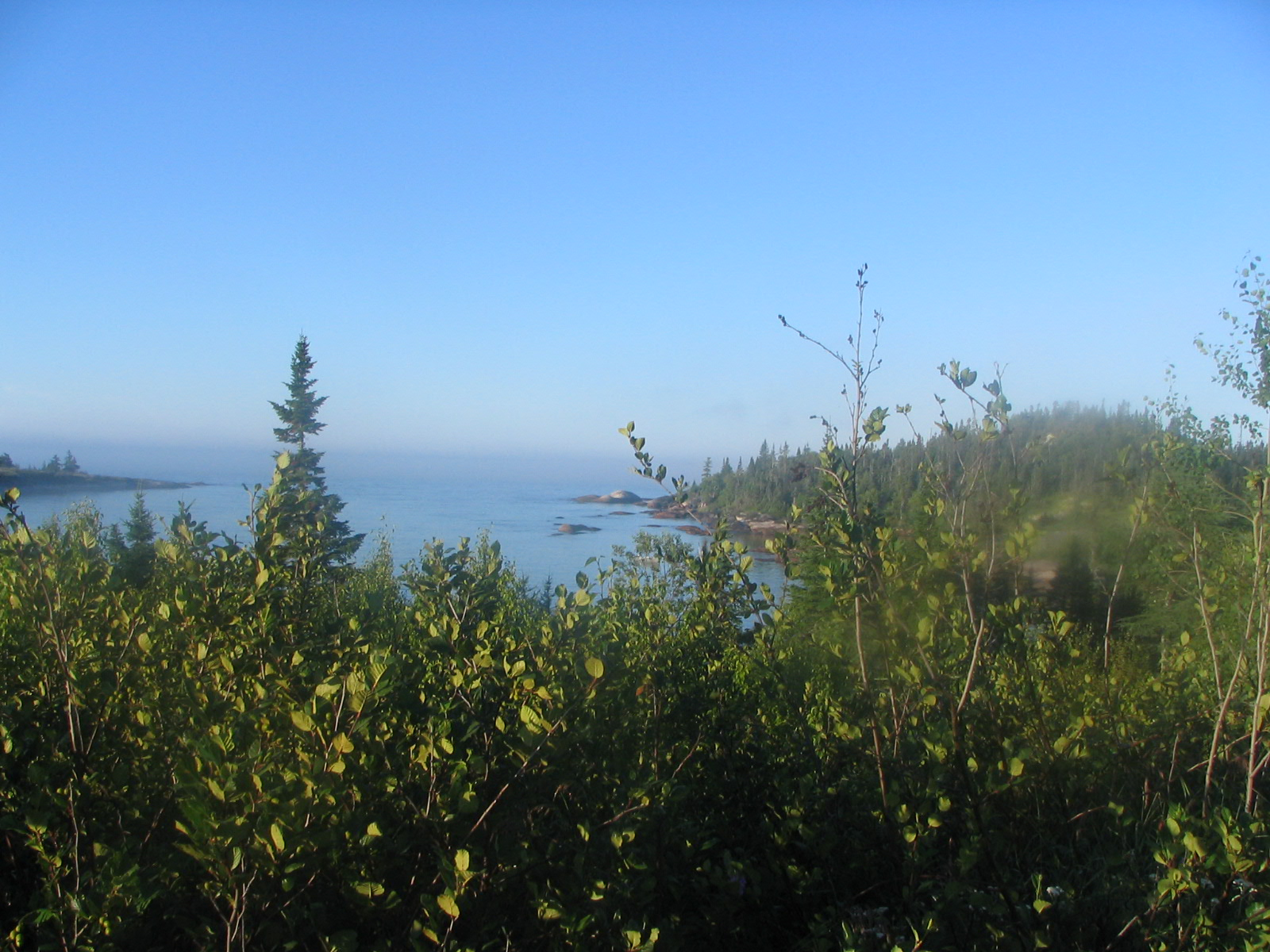
Mouth of the Pontbriand River, in Pontbriand Bay, in Gulf of St. Lawrence

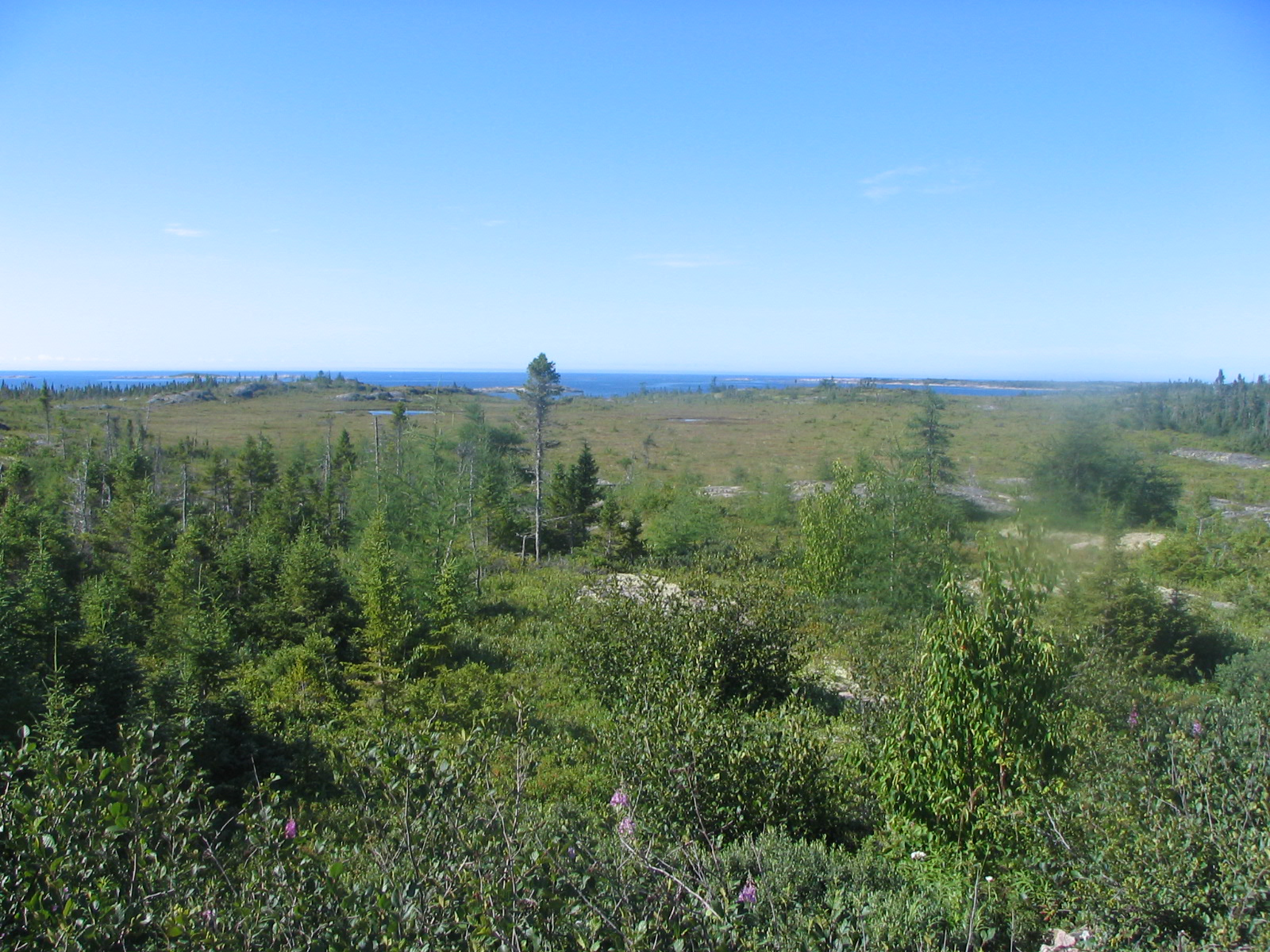
Pontbriand Bay in Gulf of St. Lawrence
