= Baie-Johan-Beetz =

Town Quebec, Canada

- Municipality
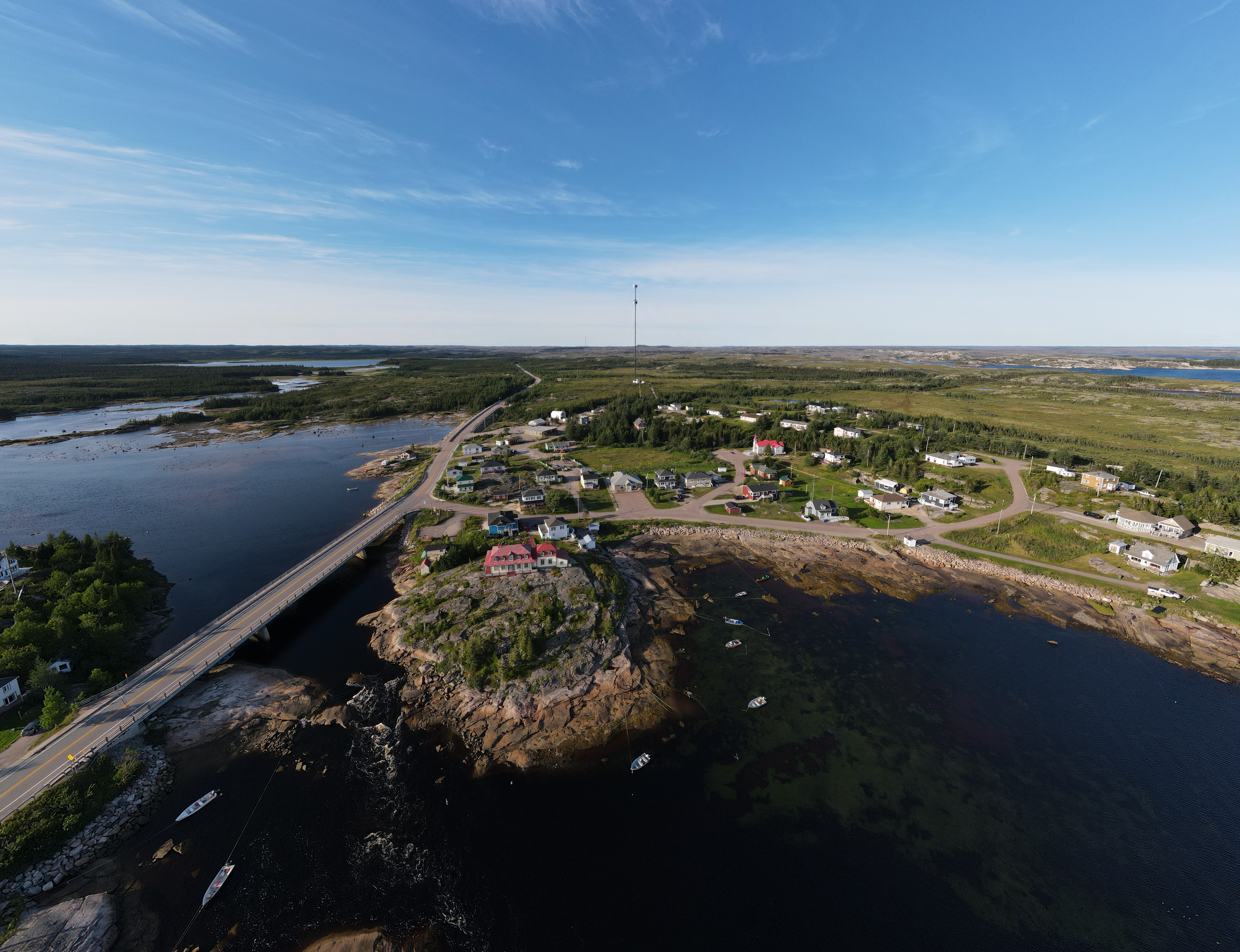
- Piashti River, Route 138, steel girder bridge 15881, Chateau Johan Beetz, Piashti Bay

- Location in Côte-Nord region of Quebec
- Coordinates: 50°17′N 62°48′W
- Country: Canada
- Province: Quebec
- Region: Côte-Nord
- RCM: Minganie
- Constituted: 1 January 1966
- Named for: Johan Beetz

Government
  - Mayor: Martin Côté
  - Federal riding: Côte-Nord—Kawawachikamach—Nitassinan
  - Prov. riding: Duplessis

Area
  - Total: 532.06 km^{2} (205.43 sq mi)
  - Land: 327.46 km^{2} (126.43 sq mi)
- Elevation: 10 m (33 ft)

Population (2021)
  - Total: 84
  - Density: 0.3/km^{2} (0.78/sq mi)
  - Pop (2016-21): ▼2.3%
  - Dwellings: 58
- Time zone: UTC-5 (Within the AST legislated time zone boundary but observes EST)
  - Summer (DST): UTC-4 (EDT)
- Postal code(s): G0G 1B0
- Area codes: 418 and 581
- Highways: R-138
- Website: www.baiejohanbeetz.qc.ca

Baie-Johan-Beetz is a municipality located near the mouth of the Piashti River on the north shore of the Gulf of St. Lawrence, in the Côte-Nord region, Minganie RCM, Quebec, Canada.

== History ==
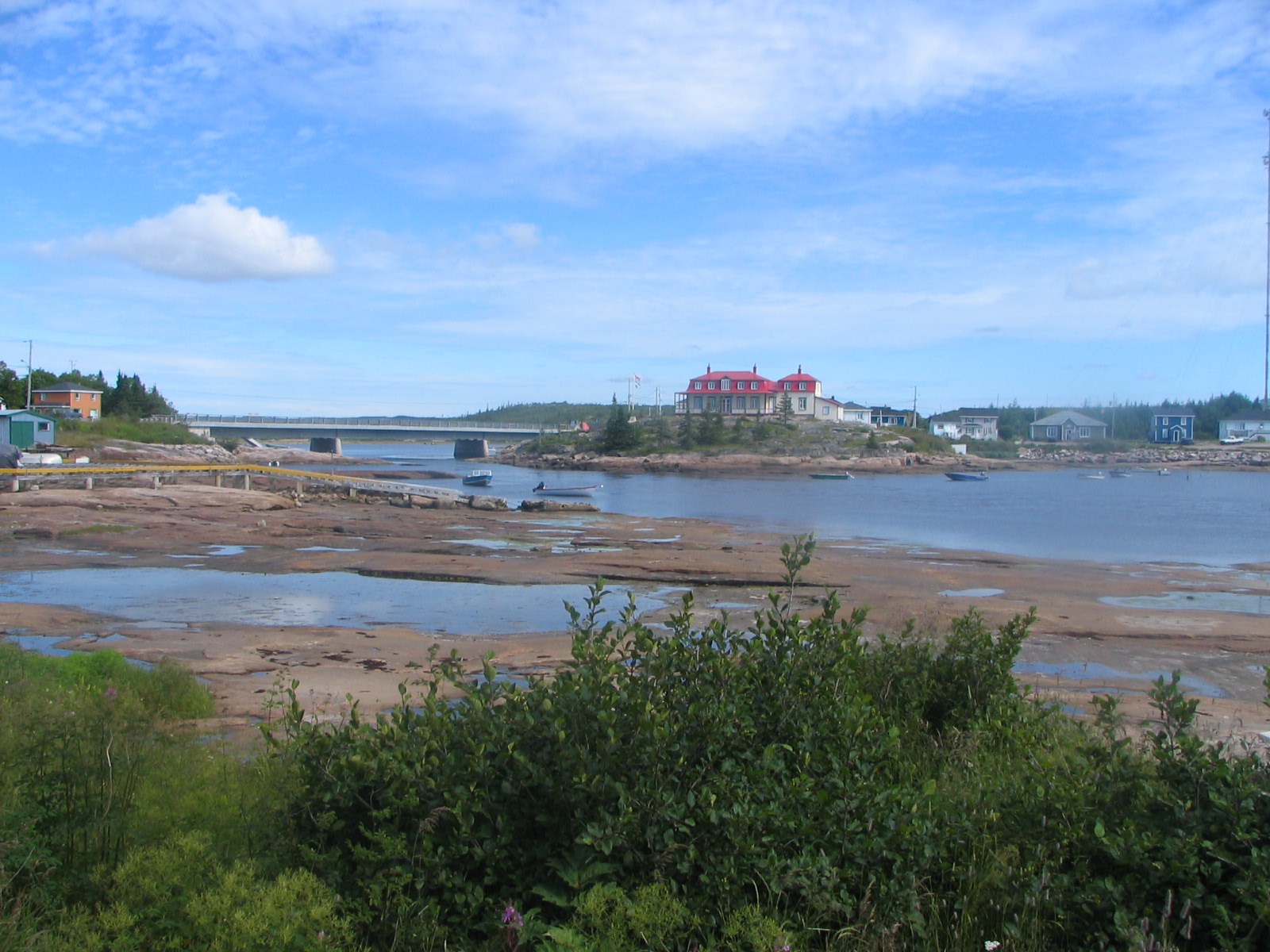
Route 138, steel girder bridge 15881, Chateau Johan Beetz, Piashti River, outcropping rocks of the Canadian Shield

In 1854, Joseph Tanguay, originally from Berthier, settled at the Little Watshishou River. Tanguay and his sons fished mostly for salmon on the Piashti, Corneille, Petite Watshishou, Watshishou and Quetachou rivers.

In 1862 Tanguay moved to Baie Piashti. Other early settlers came from the Magdalen Islands. The place was originally identified as "Piastre Bay", from the Innu expression piashite-pets, meaning "there where the water passes over/on top", or possibly originating from the word piashtibé, meaning "dry bay" or "where the water rises", which is a reference to the local bay that during low tide runs dry.

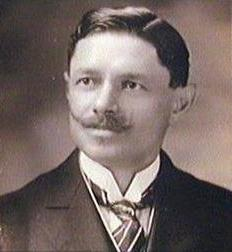
Johan Beetz (1874-1949)

In 1897, Johan Beetz (1874-1949), a Belgian aristocrat, with training in the natural sciences and medicine, immigrated there, and on 27 September 1898, married Adéla Tanguay (1884-1954), daughter of Sébastien Tanguay, a fisherman, and Marie-Louise (Henriette) Arseneault, 11 children were born of this union. Beetz built a Second Empire-inspired rural residence that residents today call Le Château ("the castle"). He hunted, fished, and trapped with the local villagers and raised foxes for their fur. He was a naturalist and ornithologist, and made numerous studies and hand drawings. He also invented a mummification process for preserving animal bodies. The many activities of Johan Beetz brought considerable impetus to the socio-economic development of the locality and that of the North Shore.

The family lived in Piastre Baie until 1922 when they moved to Ville Saint-Laurent.

== Toponymy ==
The bay's name was spelled in a variety of ways, including Piashti Bay, Pillage Bay, Baie-de-Pillage, Piastibe, Piashte Bay, and Piestebé. Perhaps for this reason, its residents expressed a desire to change the village's name to Baie-Johan-Beetz in 1910.

The Piastre Baie was renamed in 1914, but the name was not officially adopted until 1965, when the place was incorporated.

== Watshishou migratory bird sanctuary ==
Located approximately 40 kilometers west of Natashquan, this 10,673 hectare refuge extends over a little more than 23 kilometers along the coast of the Gulf of St. Lawrence, in the municipality of Baie-Johan-Beetz, and partly in Aguanish and the Mingan Archipelago National Park reserve.

The Wastishou Migratory Bird Sanctuary includes Pontbriand, Jalobert and Pashashibou bays, all islands, islets and emerging rocks in the area, as well as the offshore waters over a distance of several kilometers from the coast. In fact, the waters cover almost 90% of the refuge's surface area. Vegetation is limited to a few species of moss and lichens, because the terrestrial part of the refuge is mainly made up of rocky outcrops.

=== Birds ===
The common eider is the most abundant, the double-crested cormorant is the second most commonly found species, the third most numerous species within this sanctuary is the herring gull.

- Somateria mollissima. — Eider à duvet. — (Common Eider).
- Phalacrocorax auritus. — Cormoran à aigrettes. — (Double-crested cormorant).
- Larus argentatus. — Goéland argenté. — (Herring gull).

Bird species present in smaller numbers also benefit from this sanctuary:

- Sterna paradisaea. — Sterne arctique. — (Arctic tern).
- Sterna hirundo. — Sterne pierregarin. — (Common stern).
- Gavia stellata. — Plongeon catmarin. — (Red-throated loon).
- Gavia immer. — Plongeon huard. — (Common loon).
- Anas rubripes. — Canard noir. — (American black duck).
- Mergus serrator. — Harle huppé. — (Red-breasted merganser).Melanitta deglandi. — Macreuse à ailes blanches. — White-winged scoter).
- Melanitta perspicillata. — Macreuse à front blanc ou Macreuse à lunettes. — (Surf scoter).
- Melanitta americana. — Macreuse à bec jaune. — (Black Scoter).
Pontbriand river and Pontbriand bay

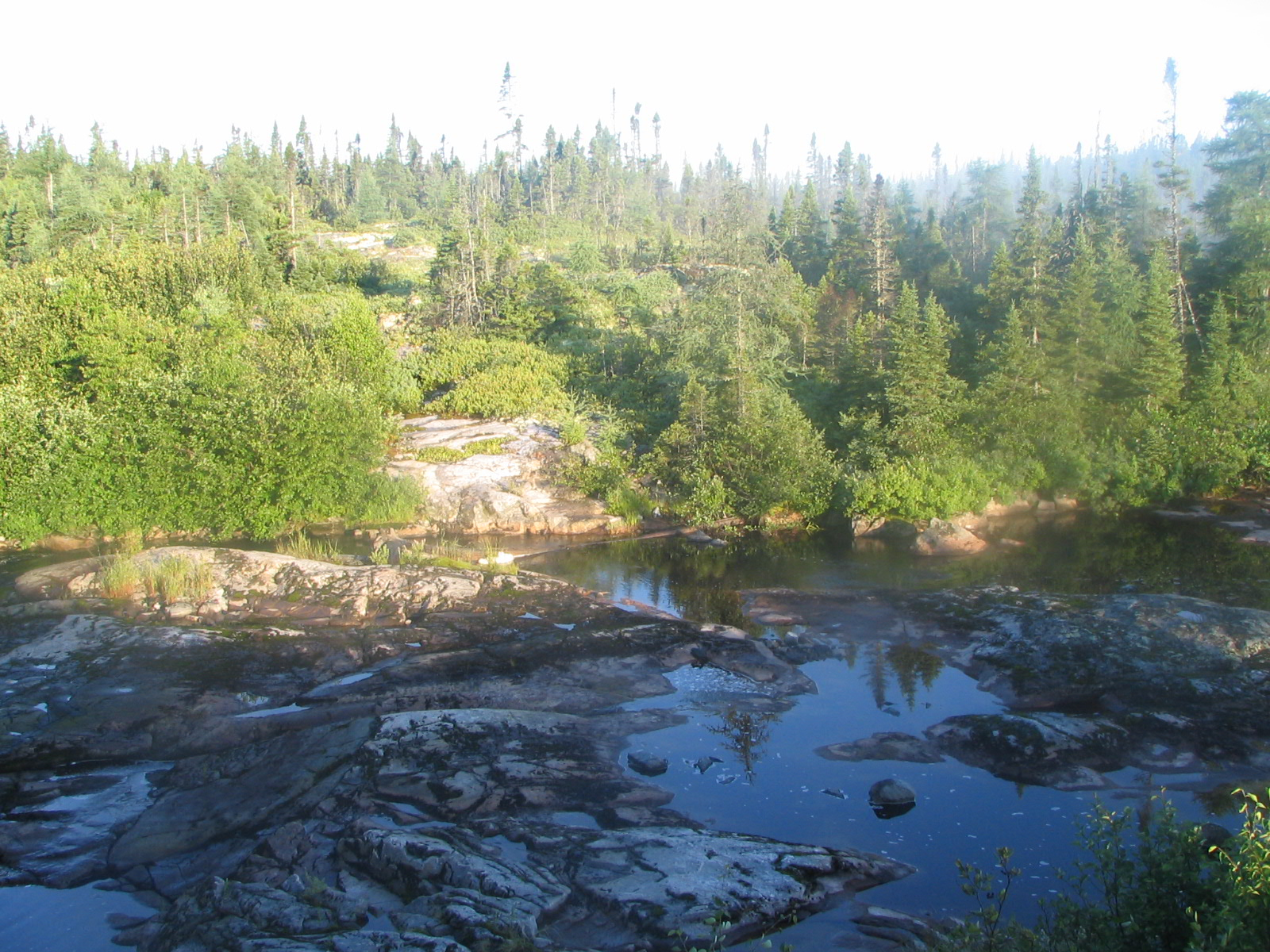
River, rocky outcrop of the Canadian Shield

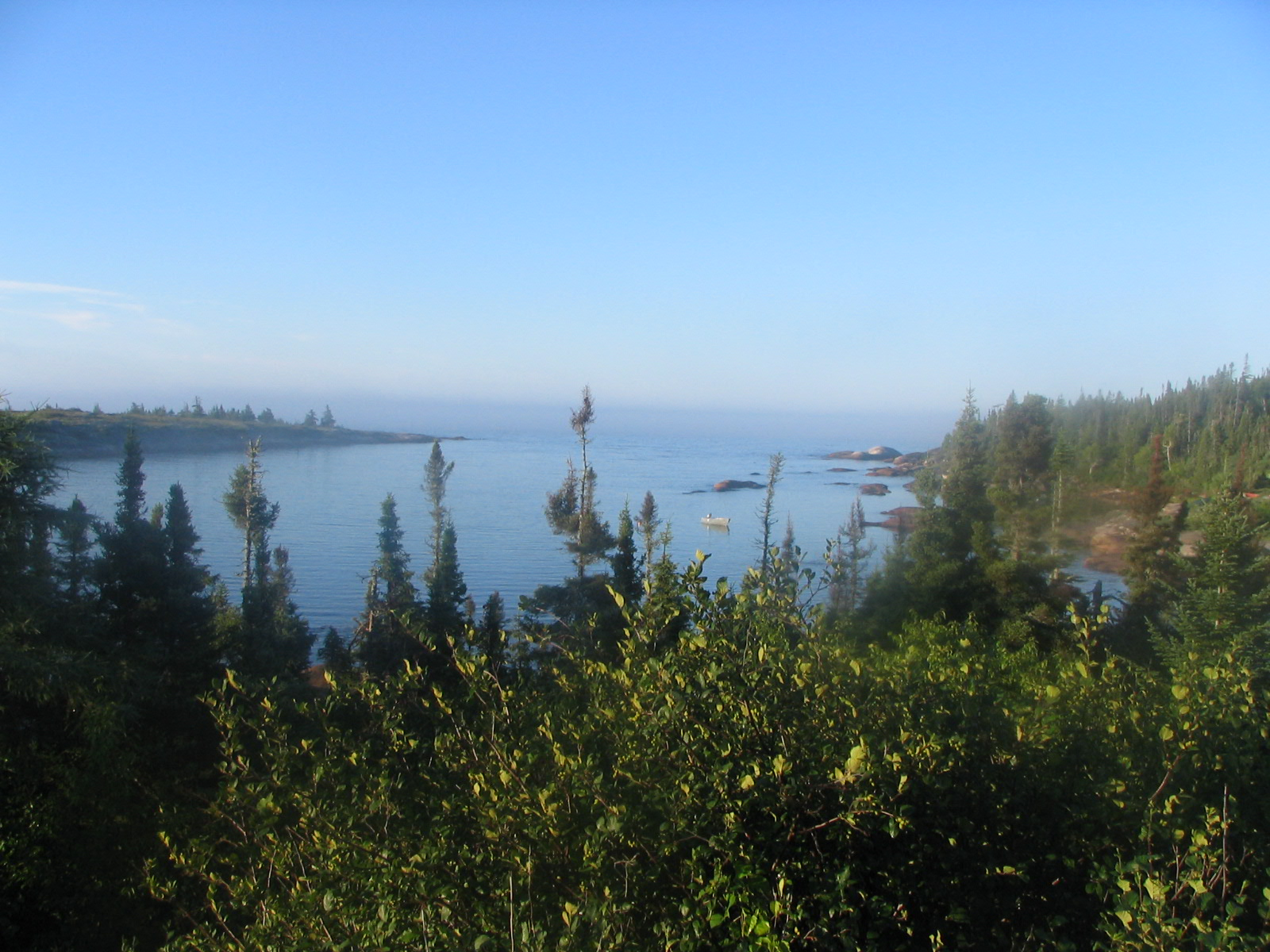
Mouth of the river, some 20 km east in Baie-Johan-Beetz (Municipality)

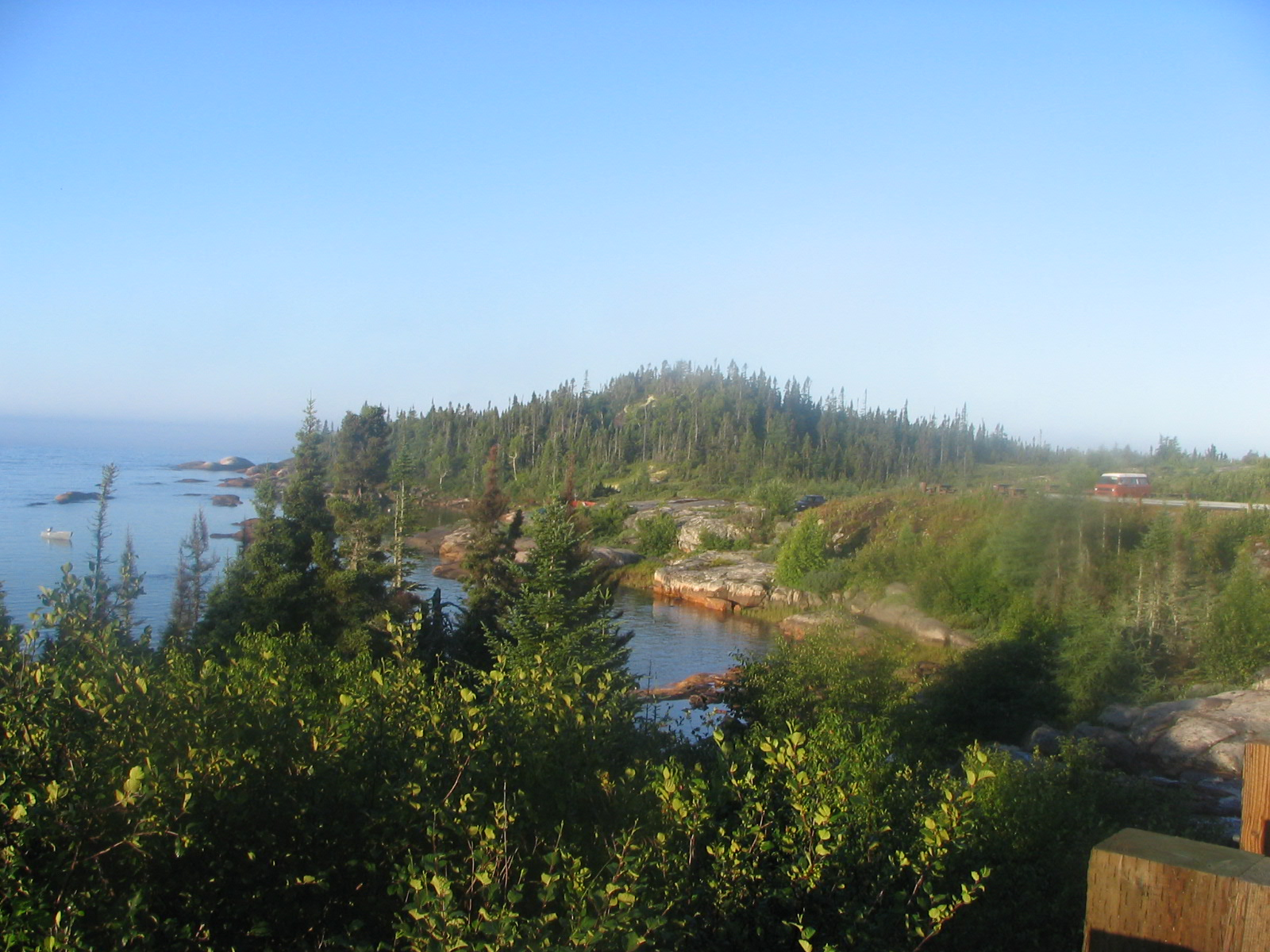
Mouth of the river and rest area from the bridge on Route 138

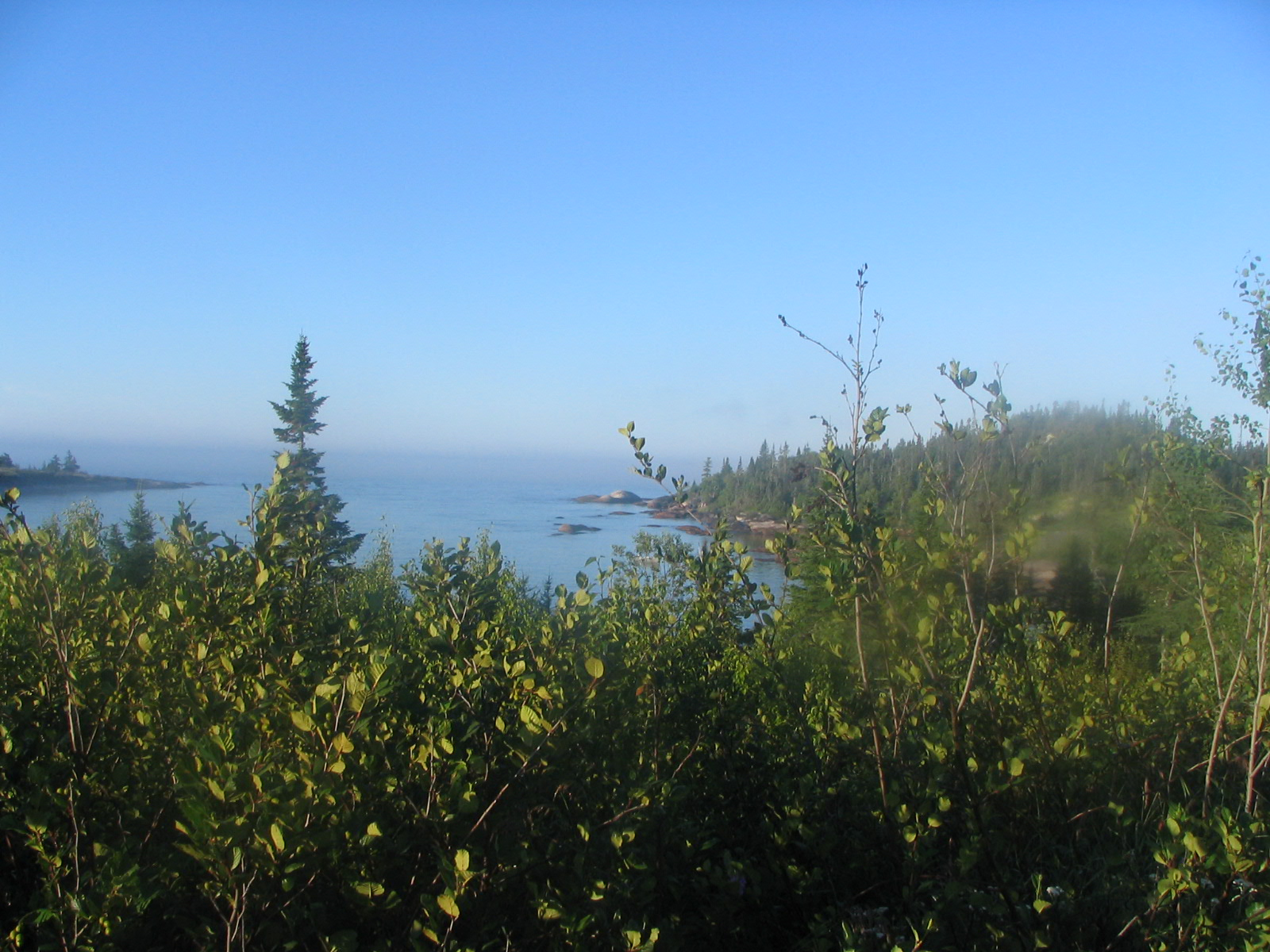
Mouth of the river, in the bay, in Gulf of St. Lawrence

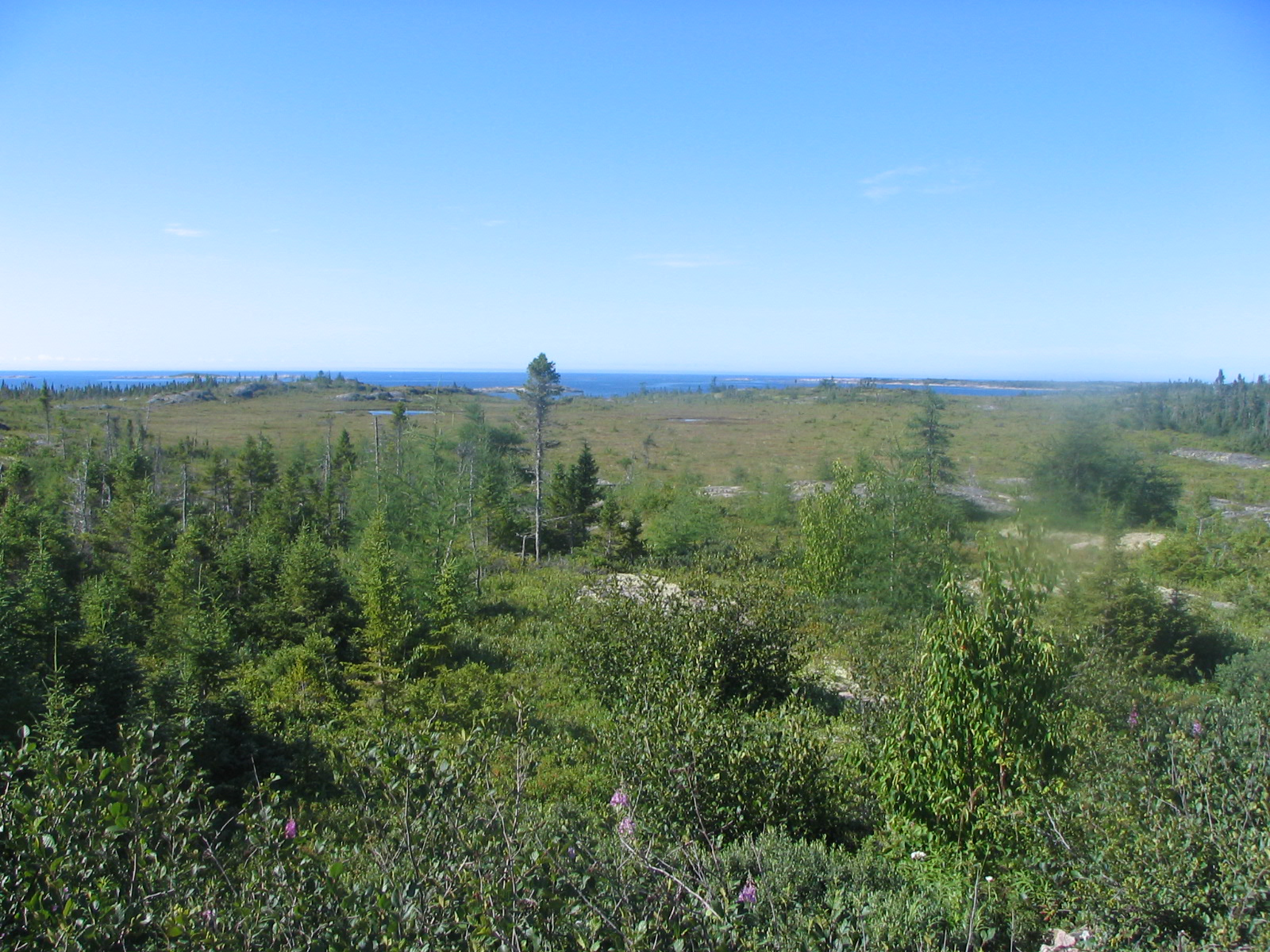
Pontbriand Bay in Gulf of St. Lawrence

== Demographics ==
=== Population ===
Canada census – Baie-Johan-Beetz community profile

	2021	2016	2011
Population	84 (-2.3% from 2016)	86 (+6.2% from 2011)	81 (-14.7% from 2006)
Land area	327.46 km^{2} (126.43 sq mi)	360.47 km^{2} (139.18 sq mi)	360.28 km^{2} (139.10 sq mi)
Population density	0.3/km^{2} (0.78/sq mi)	0.2/km^{2} (0.52/sq mi)	0.2/km^{2} (0.52/sq mi)
Median age	60.0 (M: 60.0, F: 61.2)	54.3 (M: 53.8, F: 55.5)	53.8 (M: 49.5, F: 55.0)
Private dwellings	58 (total) 44 (occupied)	54 (total) 43 (occupied)	46 (total)
Median household income	$.N/A	$.n/a	$.N/A

Notes: Income data for this area has been suppressed for data quality or confidentiality reasons.
References: 2021 2016 2011

Historical Census Data – Baie-Johan-Beetz, Quebec

Year	Pop.	±%
1966	241	—
1971	235	−2.5%
1976	168	−28.5%
1981	150	−10.7%

Year	Pop.	±%
1986	112	−25.3%
1991	107	−4.5%
1996	85	−20.6%
2001	89	+4.7%

Year	Pop.	±%
2006	95	+6.7%
2011	81	−14.7%
2016	86	+6.2%
2021	84	−2.3%

Source: Statistics Canada

=== Language ===
Canada Census Mother Tongue – Baie-Johan-Beetz, Quebec
Census	Total	French			English			French & English			Other		
Year	Responses	Count	Trend	Pop %	Count	Trend	Pop %	Count	Trend	Pop %	Count	Trend	Pop %
2011	80	80	▼11.1%	100.00%	0	0.0%	0.00%	0	0.0%	0.00%	0	0.0%	0.00%
2006	90	90	▲5.6%	100.00%	0	0.0%	0.00%	0	0.0%	0.00%	0	0.0%	0.00%
2001	85	85	▲5.9%	100.00%	0	0.0%	0.00%	0	0.0%	0.00%	0	0.0%	0.00%
1996	80	80	n/a	100.00%	0	n/a	0.00%	0	n/a	0.00%	0	n/a	0.00%

== Climate ==
Climate data for Baie-Johan-Beetz
Month	Jan	Feb	Mar	Apr	May	Jun	Jul	Aug	Sep	Oct	Nov	Dec	Year
Record high °C (°F)	8.9 (48.0)	6.5 (43.7)	11 (52)	16.5 (61.7)	32 (90)	29 (84)	28.5 (83.3)	29 (84)	28.3 (82.9)	20.6 (69.1)	13.3 (55.9)	8.3 (46.9)	32 (90)
Mean daily maximum °C (°F)	−8.3 (17.1)	−7.2 (19.0)	−1.5 (29.3)	4 (39)	10.3 (50.5)	15.7 (60.3)	19.3 (66.7)	18.8 (65.8)	14 (57)	7.8 (46.0)	1.7 (35.1)	−5.1 (22.8)	5.8 (42.4)
Daily mean °C (°F)	−13.7 (7.3)	−12.8 (9.0)	−6.6 (20.1)	0.2 (32.4)	6 (43)	11.2 (52.2)	14.9 (58.8)	14.2 (57.6)	9.7 (49.5)	4.2 (39.6)	−1.9 (28.6)	−9.7 (14.5)	−1.3 (29.7)
Mean daily minimum °C (°F)	−19.1 (−2.4)	−18.4 (−1.1)	−11.7 (10.9)	−3.7 (25.3)	1.6 (34.9)	6.6 (43.9)	10.4 (50.7)	9.7 (49.5)	5.3 (41.5)	0.6 (33.1)	−5.4 (22.3)	−14.2 (6.4)	−3.2 (26.2)
Record low °C (°F)	−37.8 (−36.0)	−38 (−36)	−35 (−31)	−23.5 (−10.3)	−11.1 (12.0)	−2.5 (27.5)	2.8 (37.0)	−0.6 (30.9)	−5.6 (21.9)	−12.2 (10.0)	−21.5 (−6.7)	−33.9 (−29.0)	−38 (−36)
Average precipitation mm (inches)	72.4 (2.85)	40.4 (1.59)	60.5 (2.38)	56.8 (2.24)	90.8 (3.57)	99.4 (3.91)	101.4 (3.99)	95.3 (3.75)	103.9 (4.09)	105.7 (4.16)	89.7 (3.53)	73.3 (2.89)	989.6 (38.96)
Source: Environment Canada

== Cultural heritage ==
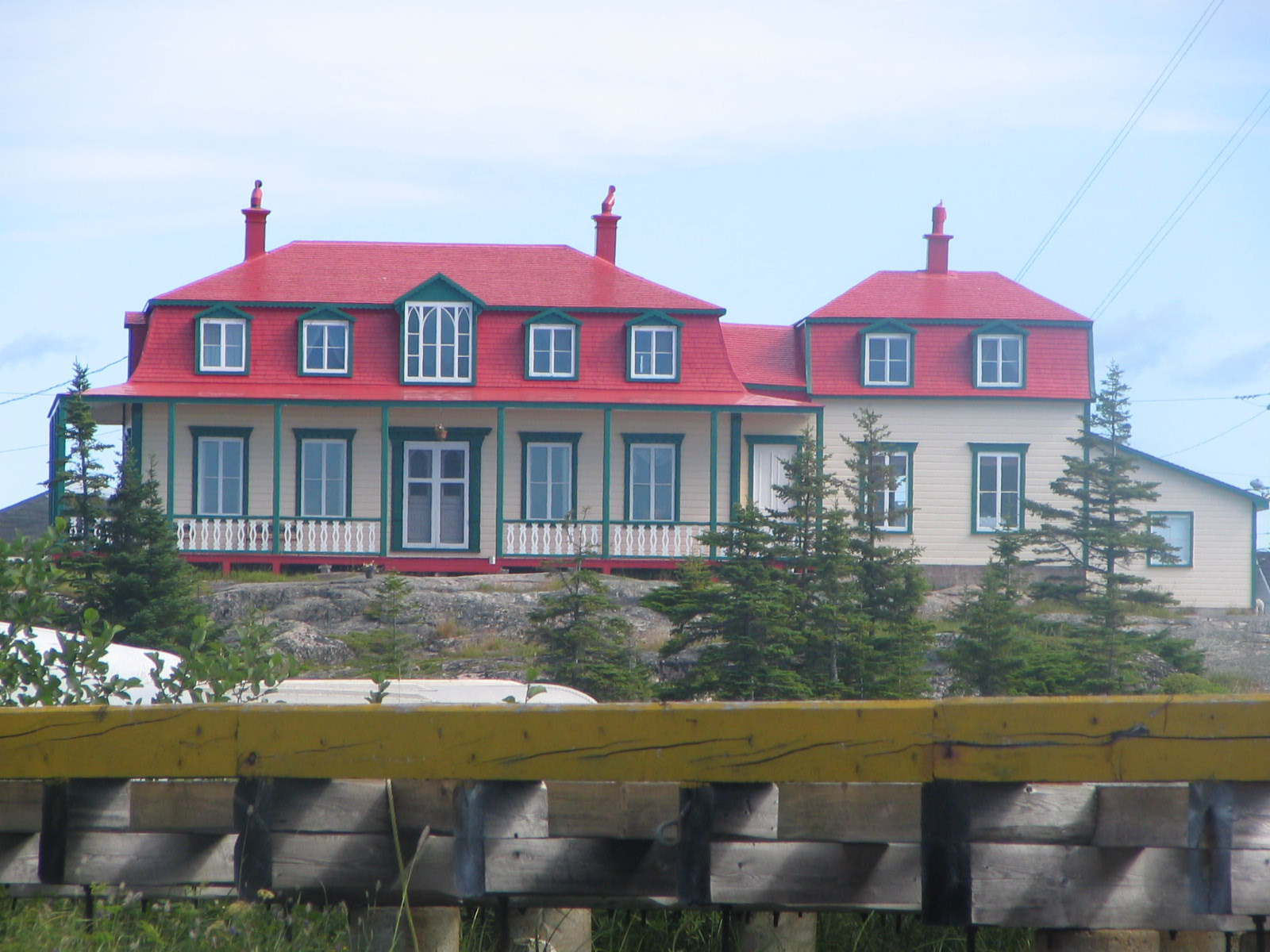
Family residence of Johan Beetz (1874-1949) and Adéla Tanguay (1884-1954)

The Johan-Beetz House, a Second Empire-inspired rural residence built in 1899, dominates the landscape of a rocky promontory jutting into the Gulf of St. Lawrence, at the mouth of the Piashti River. Listed in the Quebec Cultural Heritage directory, this property is classified as a heritage building. The protection applies to the exterior and interior of the building, and not to the land.

Wooden sidewalks, in 1987, a study by Ministry of Transport Quebec mentioned:

…there are more than 600 m of continuous wooden sidewalks along the existing road in Baie-Johan-Beetz. The dismantling of the wooden sidewalks would constitute a loss for local heritage.

In 2020, a municipal regulation recommends rebuilding these picturesque elements that are an integral part of the landscape.

… Not so long ago, the entire village of Baie-Johan-Beetz was crisscrossed by a network of wooden sidewalks. Much of this network has disappeared over time but a few remain. It is important to restore and highlight these wooden sidewalks.

Cultural and Naturel heritages

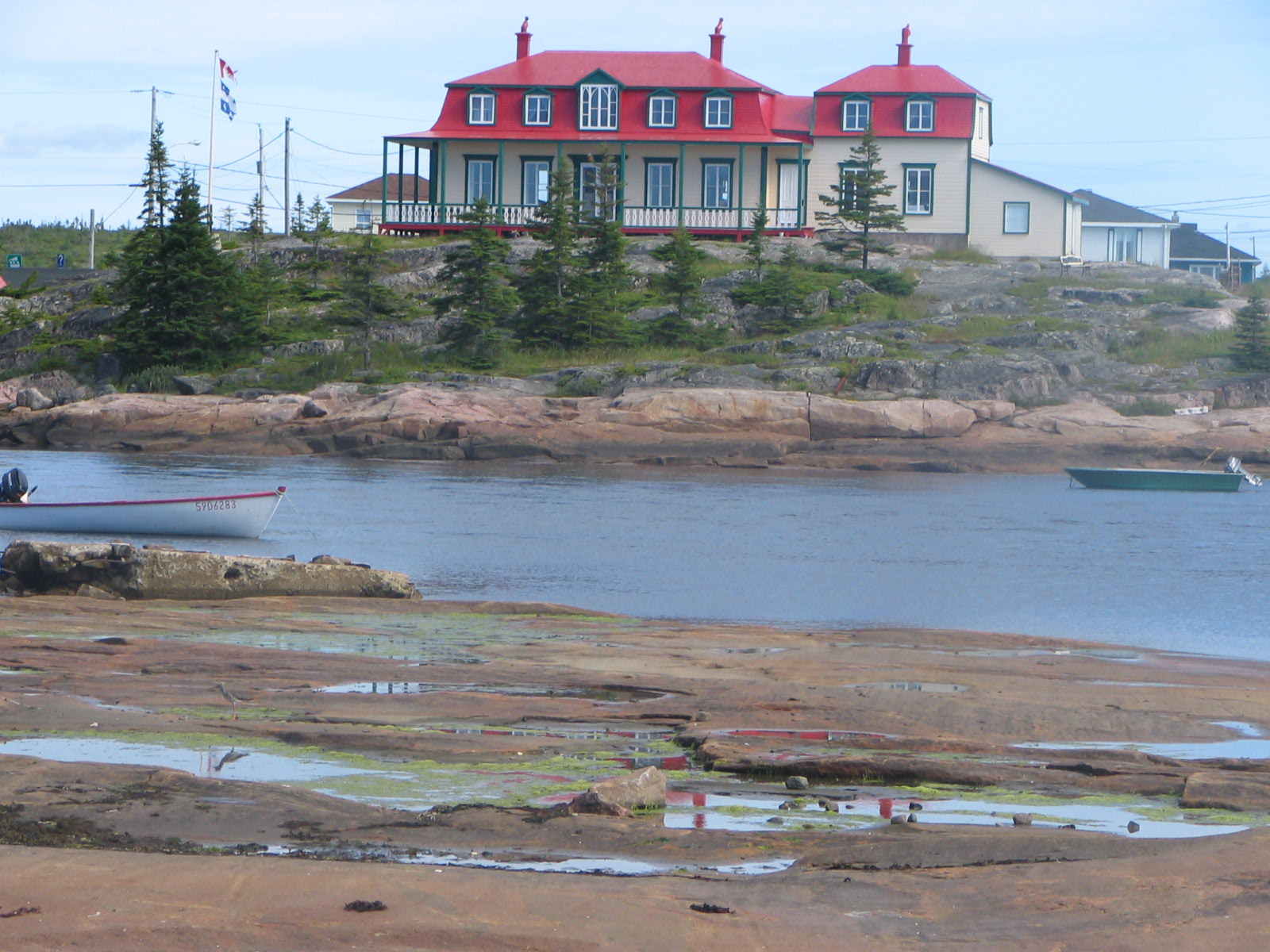
Johan Beetz House (Le Chateau), Piashti River, rock of Canadian Shield

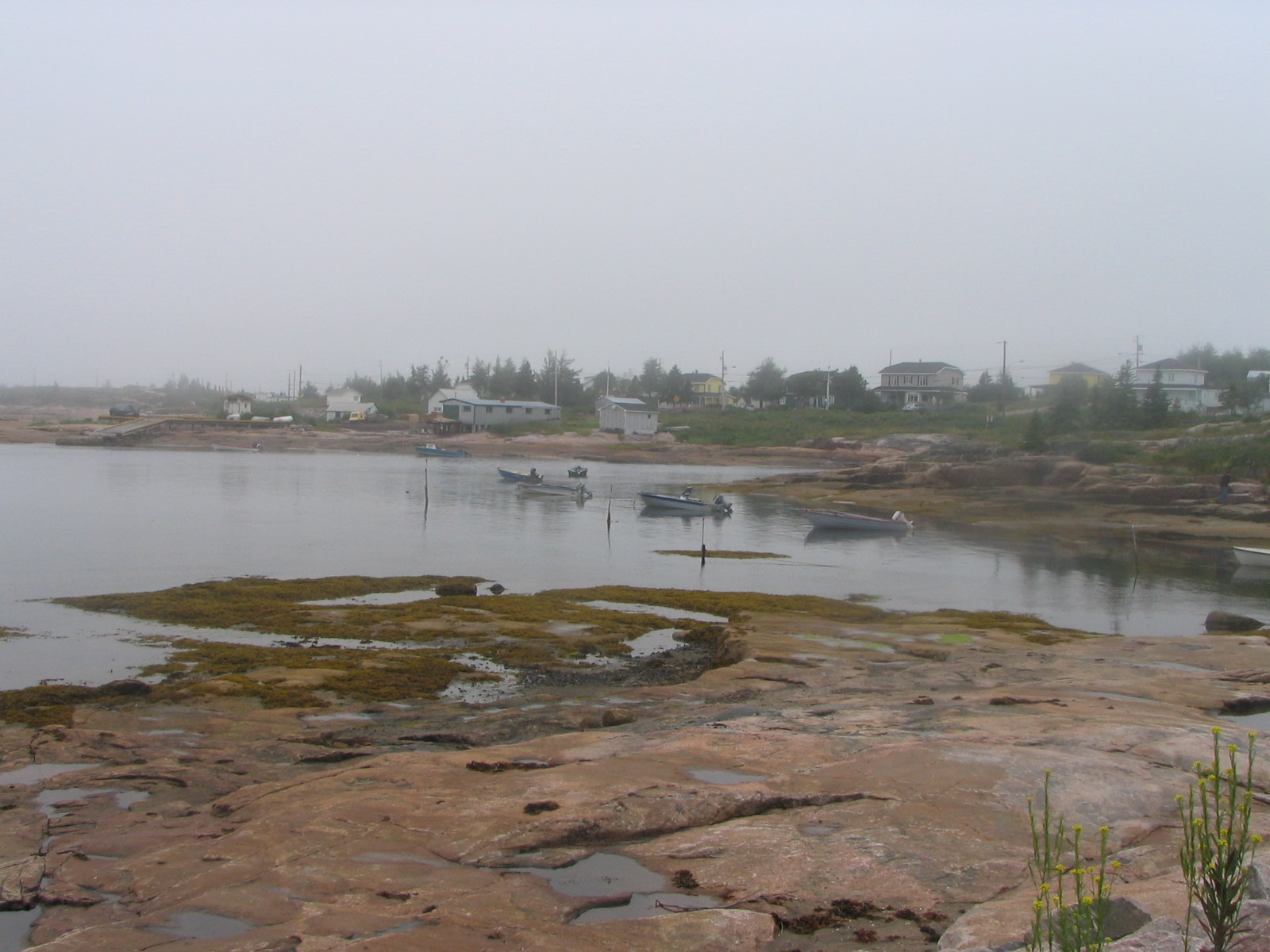
Piashti River, boats at anchor, sheds and wooden boardwalks

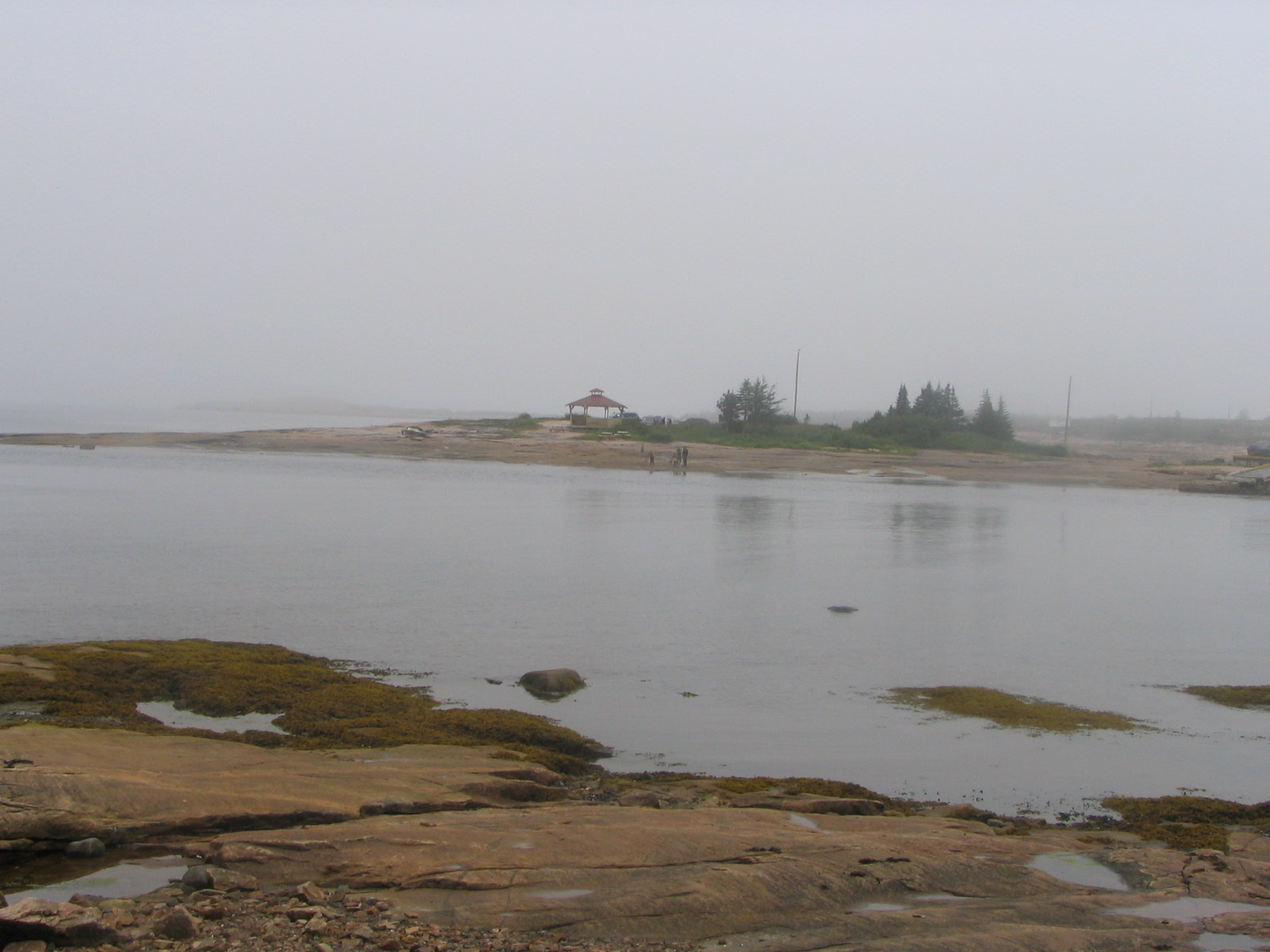
Baie-Johan-Beetz Park

== Transport ==
For the best part of the 20th century, depending on the ice conditions, the Clarke Steamship Co. Ltd. ships, departing from Montreal and Quebec, regularly stopped at Johan Beetz. From the locality to reach the interior of the region, two canoe routes are available to travelers. One follows the Piashti River to Lake Bellanger, and gives access to the western part. The second road follows the Watshishou River to a point two and a half miles north of Véronique Lake. Both rivers contain numerous rapids and falls, and there are eleven portages between the Gulf and Bellanger Lake and 21 portages before reaching Prudent Lake. Several large lakes, particularly in the northern half of the region, are suitable for seaplane landings.

In 1996, Quebec Route 138 (The Whale Route) was extended to Havre-Saint-Pierre, thus connecting the village of Baie-Johan-Beetz to the Quebec road network.

The city is served by the Baie-Johan-Beetz Seaplane Base (SPB) (IATA: YBJ).

== See also ==
- List of municipalities in Quebec
