= Johan Beetz =

Canadian naturalist

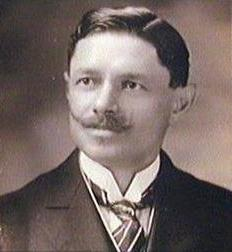
Johan Beetz (1874–1949)

Johan Beetz (1874–1949), a Belgian physician, surgeon, naturalist, painter, illustrator and businessmen, settled in Piastre Baie (Baie-Johan-Beetz) in 1897, on the north shore of the Gulf of St. Lawrence, in the Côte-Nord region, Minganie RCM, in Quebec, Canada.

== Biography ==
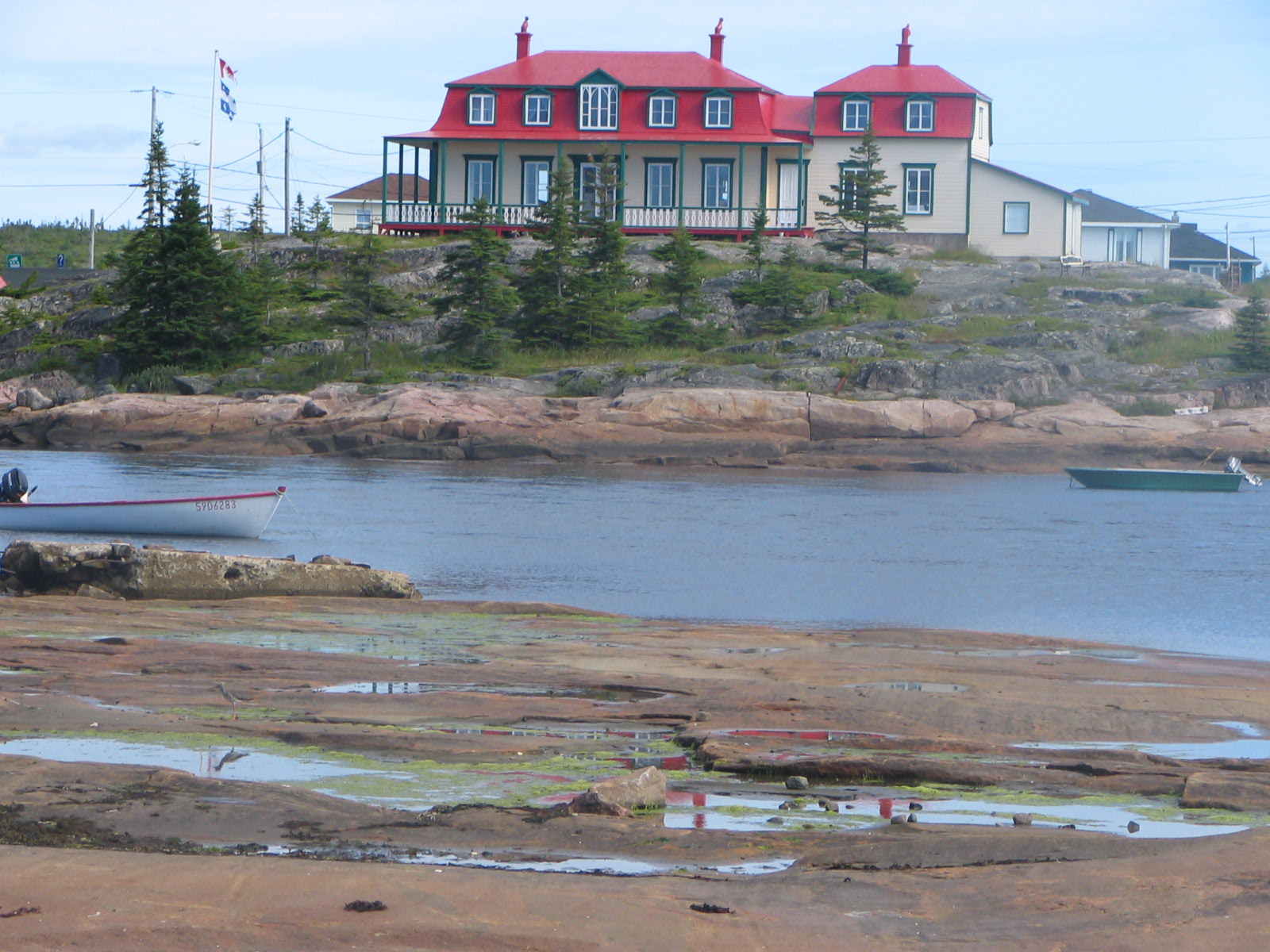
Family residence of Johan Beetz and Adéla Tanguay (Le Chateau) Baie-Johan-Beetz

Johan Beetz was born in 1874, in an aristocratic family, at the château d'Oudenhouven, Boortmeerbeek, Belgium. His father Johannes Beetz died when he was two years old and his mother Céline Verzyl (or Versyl) remarried an English major named Walter Turner. He had a privileged childhood and the future King Albert was among his childhood acquaintances. In his youth, he participated in hunting in Morocco, Algeria and Congo, and took part in archeological digs. He studied medicine and biology.

However, his fiancée (and cousin) Marthe Versyl died of pneumonia. Apparently seeking a change in his life, he considered moving from Belgium to Africa, but then he happened to converse with a certain Monsieur Warner, who talked about the hunting and fishing in Pashti-Baie (or Piastrebaie), rename Baie-Johan-Beetz in Côte-Nord region, along the shore of the Gulf of St. Lawrence in Quebec, Canada, where Warner had a house.

Beetz bought Warner's house on the spot and moved there in May 1897. Within this year, Beetz meet Henry de Puyjalon, a pioneer in Canadian ecology who was among the first to suggest wildlife conservation areas. Beetz married a local girl Adéla Tanguay (1884–1954), on September 27 1898, he built a Second Empire-inspired rural residence that residents today call le château (the castle).

As early as 1910, residents expressed the desire to change the name from Piastre Baie to Baie-Johan-Beetz; this name would become official upon the creation of the municipality on December 5, 1968.

Baie-Johan-Beetz on Piashti River 2004

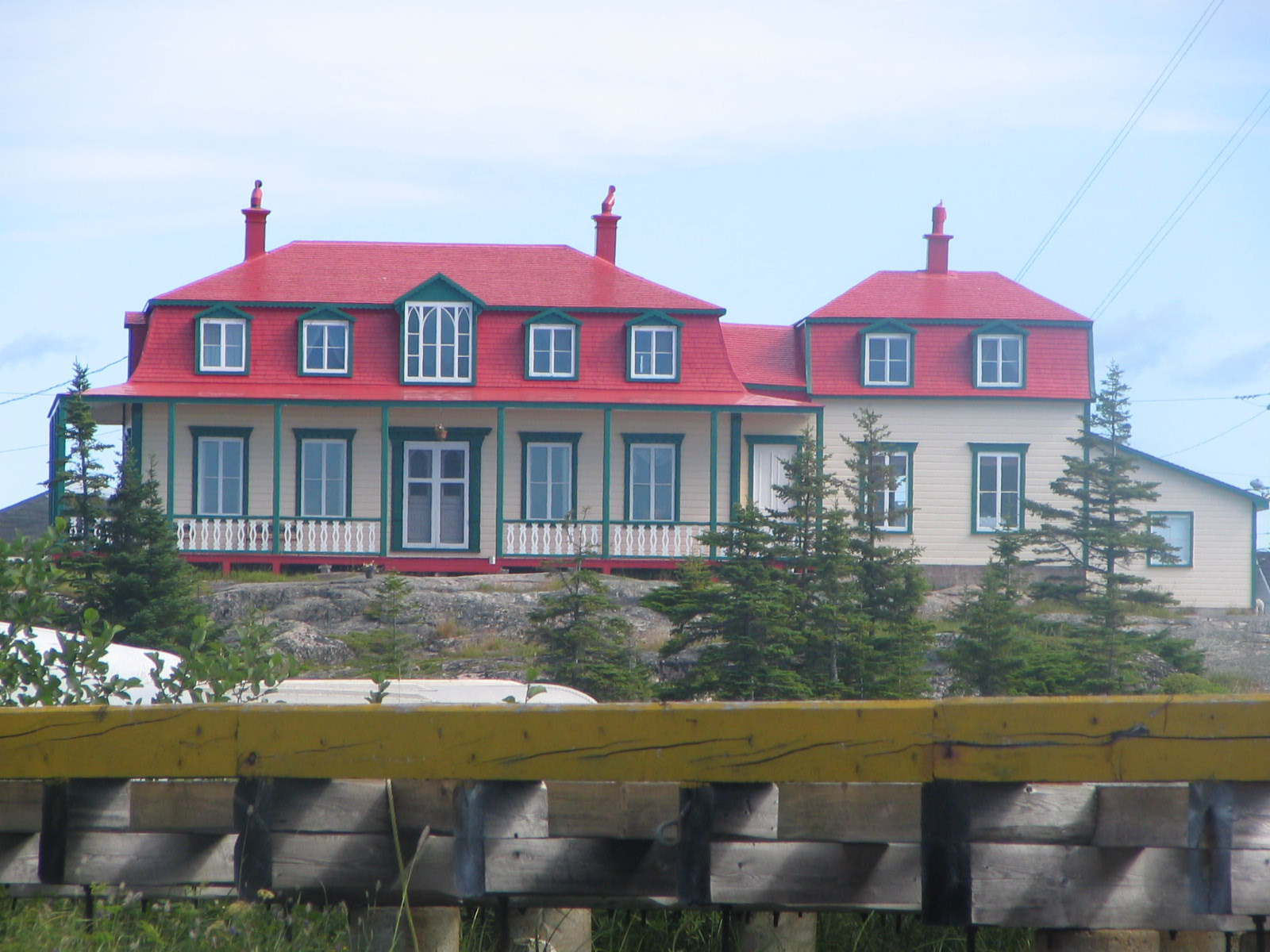
Family residence of Johan Beetz and Adéla Tanguay (Le Chateau)

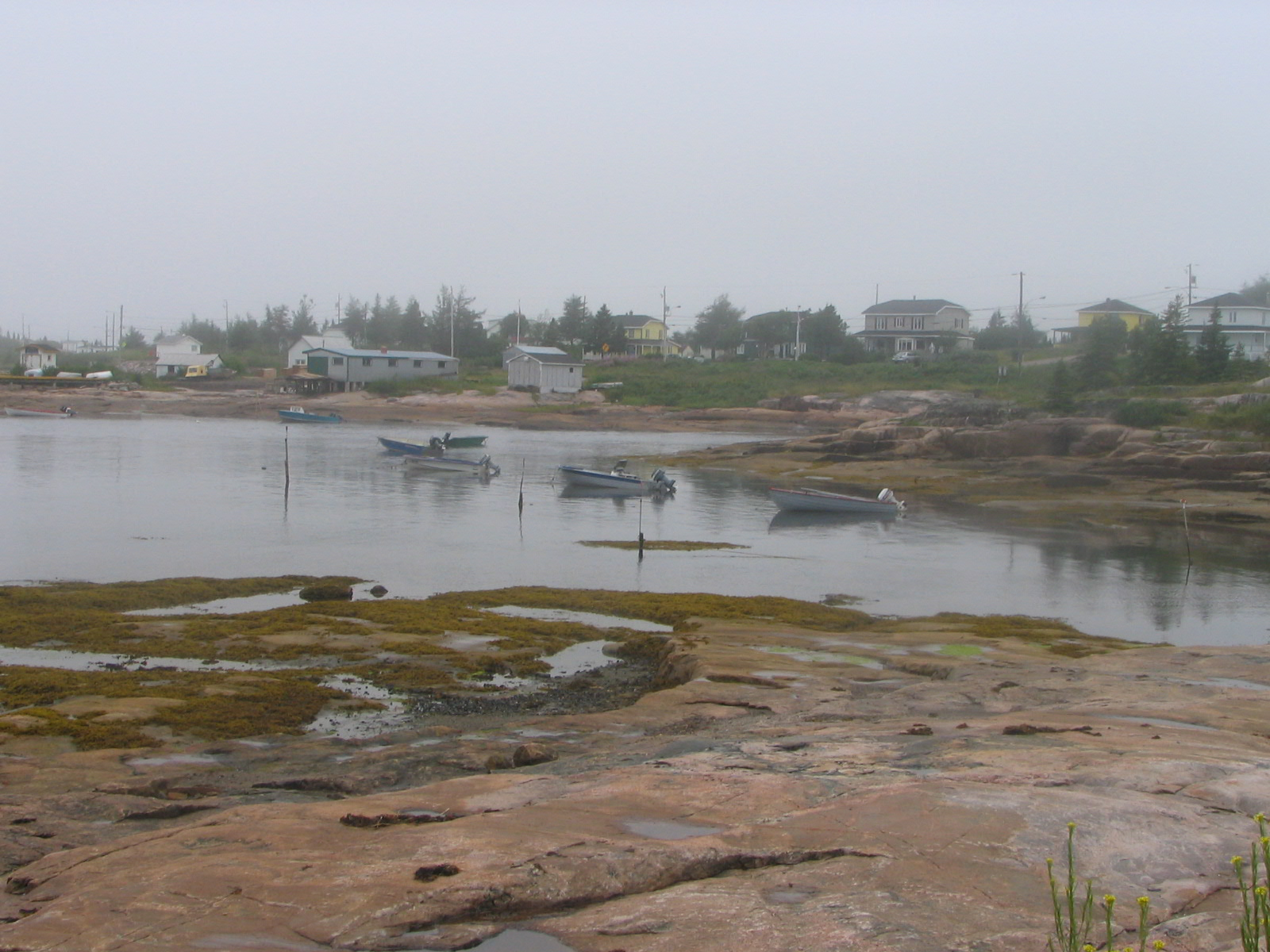
Boats at anchor, sheds and wooden boardwalks

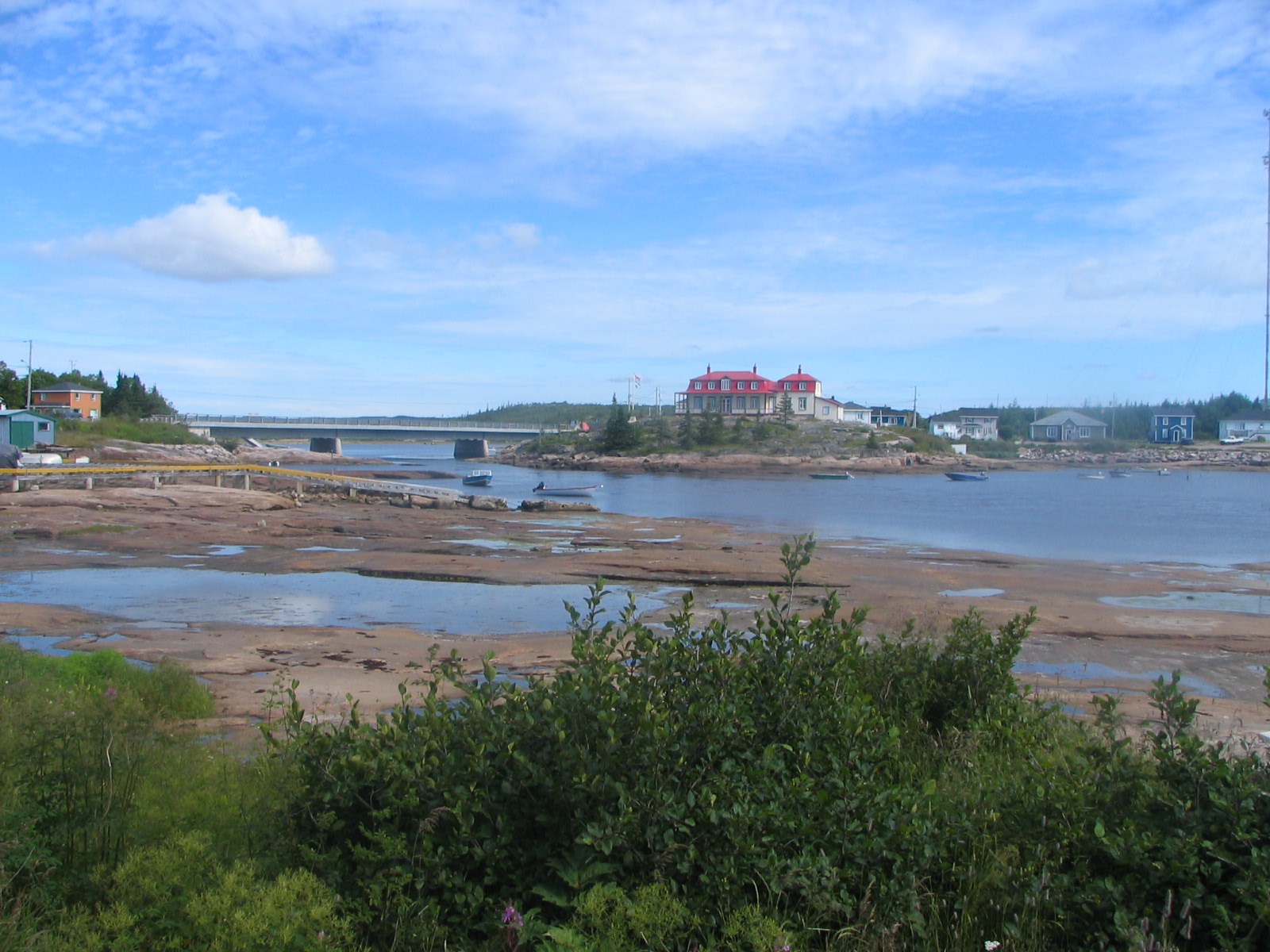
Route 138, outcropping rocks of the Canadian Shield

== Physician, naturalist and businessman ==
Beetz hunted, fished, and trapped with the local villagers, and raised foxes for their fur.

=== Silver fox ===
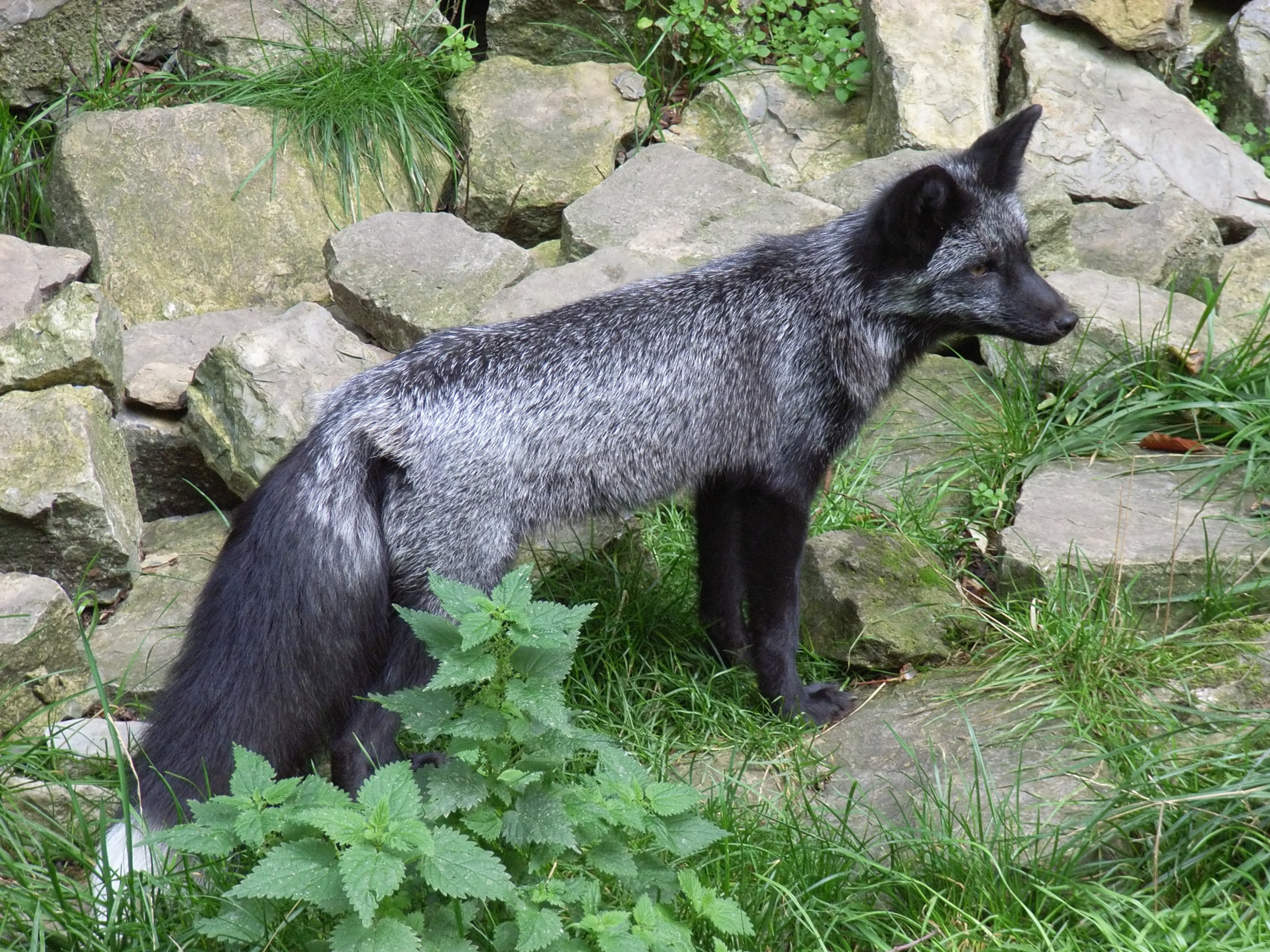
Vulpes vulpes fulva Desmarest. – Renard argenté (French). – American Red Fox, Eastern American Red Fox, Silver Fox.

Johan Beetz's experiences made him the pioneer in vulpiculture farming in Quebec. Around 1900, with the help of Innu guides, Beetz began breeding silver foxes with foxes captured in the wild, inland from Piashtepeu (Baie-Johan-Beetz).

Beetz notes that the silver fox's dark pigmentation appears because of the climate it lives in, its diet and the water it consumes. With years of research and experiments, Beetz succeeded in controlling the heredity of foxes by causing the reproduction of melanism, he arrived at the creation of the silver fox breed through seven generations of matings necessary to form the pure silver breed.

By organizing breedings taking into account his studies, Beetz created a considerable fox park valued at $300,000 in 1913.

=== Naturalist and ornithologist ===
He was a naturalist and ornithologist, and made numerous studies and hand drawings. He also invented a mummification process for preserving animal bodies, however, the technique was lost when he died. From 1903 to 1913 he was the local postmaster, and he often served as a sort of doctor. He was credited with sparing the village from the Spanish influenza in 1918–1919 by restricting external contact and disinfecting mail.

The many activities of Johan Beetz brought considerable impetus to the socio-economic development of the locality and that of the North Shore.

In 1922 the Beetz family moved to Saint-Laurent, then a suburb of Montreal and today a borough of the city. He bought a house there at 54 rue Saint-Germain. In July 1924, he was made a chevalier in the Order of Leopold II by the Belgian government. He later lived at 322 avenue Laurier, in Quebec City, which has a plaque mentioning that fact. In 1931 he founded a zoo in Charlesbourg (today part of Quebec City), later known by the name Jardin zoologique de Québec (it closed in 2006).

He continued to raise foxes at a farm in Vaudreuil. When the business was badly affected by the 1929 stock market crash, he was named director of the fox furring department at the Service de l'élevage des animaux à fourrure of the Quebec government. He wrote a book on the subject entitled "L'Indispensable" à l'éleveur de renards argentés; it was published in English translation as "The Indispensable" for Fox Breeders, translated by Thos. J. Carbray. The Université de Montréal wished to give him an honorary doctorate; however, he preferred to deliver an oral thesis presentation, for which he was granted a Doctor of Science degree (Docteur ès Science agricole (vulpiculture)). The fox breeding industry in Quebec did not survive long after the death of its founder, however.

In 1965, the village where he spent many years of his life was renamed Baie-Johan-Beetz. There are streets named after him in both Baie-Johan-Beetz and Sept-Îles. There is also a lake, Lac Beetz, in the Lac-Jérôme unorganized territory, which may be named for him, although the Commission de toponymie du Québec does not attest this.

Johan Beetz was the grandfather of Jean Beetz, a justice of the Supreme Court of Canada.
