= Pashashibou River =

Pashashibou River Rivière Pashashibou
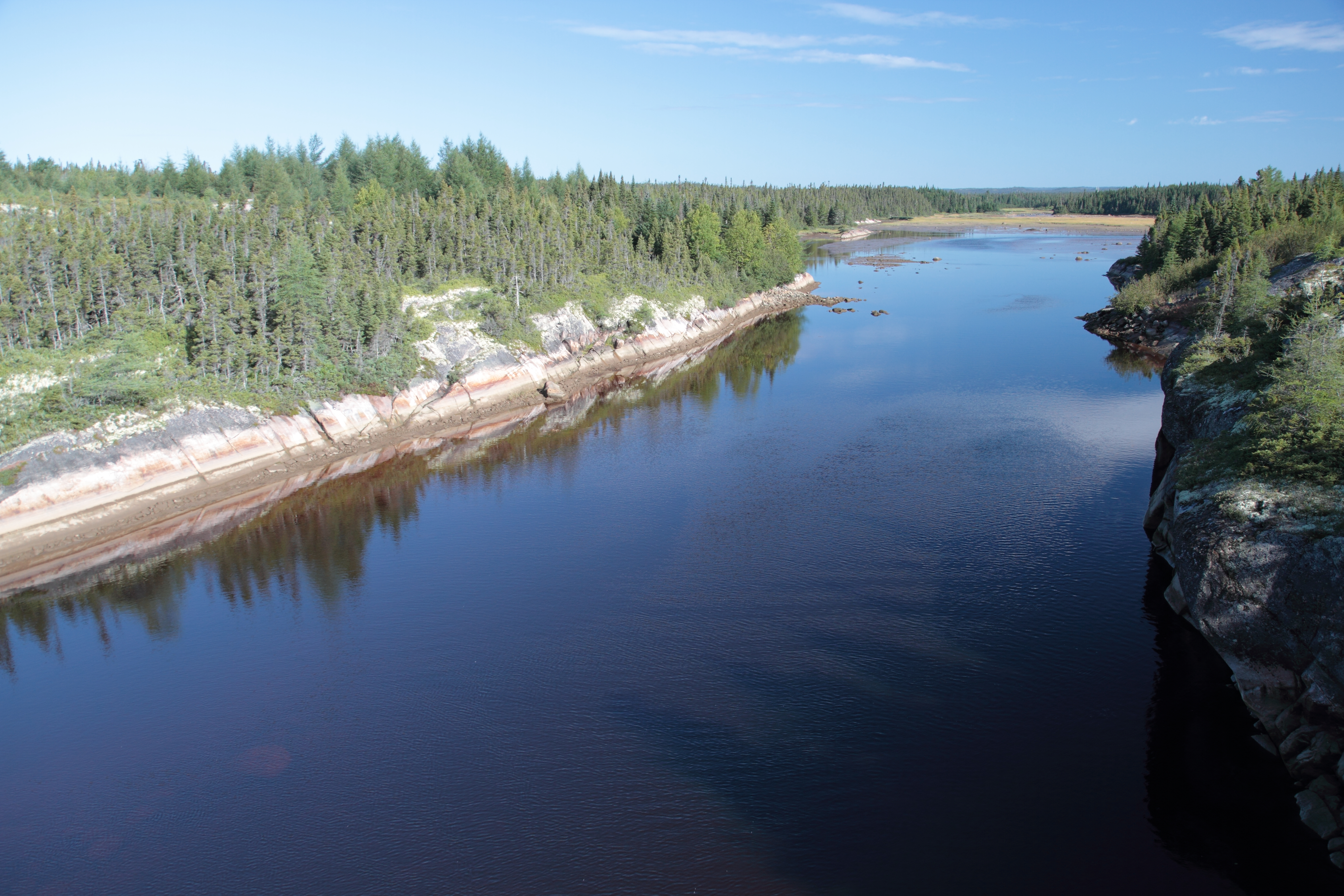
- The river near its mouth, looking north from Quebec Route 138

- Location within Quebec
- Native name: Pihu Hipu (Innu)

Location
- Country: Canada
- Province: Quebec
- Region: Côte-Nord
- RCM: Minganie

Physical characteristics
- Source: Lake Costebelle
- Mouth: Gulf of Saint Lawrence
  - coordinates: 50.2775°N 62.3486111°W
  - elevation: 0 metres (0 ft)
- Length: 17 kilometres (11 mi)
- Basin size: 154 square kilometres (59 sq mi)

The Pashashibou River (French: Rivière Pashashibou) is a river in the Côte-Nord region of Quebec, Canada. It flows into the Gulf of Saint Lawrence.

== Location ==
The Pashashibou River rises in Lake Costebelle and flows south for 17 kilometres (11 mi) to Pashashibou Bay on the Gulf of Saint Lawrence. The river is scarcely navigable in a canoe for the first 10 kilometres (6.2 mi) from its mouth, and then becomes no more than a stream. Its mouth is about 40 kilometres (25 mi) west of Natashquan. The mouth of the Pashashibou River is in the municipality of Aguanish in the Minganie Regional County Municipality.

The shoreline extending to both sides of the river mouth is protected by the 10.88 square kilometres (4.20 sq mi) Pashashibou Bay Waterfowl Concentration Area (Aire de concentration d'oiseaux aquatiques de la Baie Pashashibou), an IUCN Management Category IV region designated in 2005 and managed by the Ministry of Forests, Wildlife and Parks.

== Name ==
The Innu of Natashquan call the river Pihu Hipu, which means "river with a lynx". Jacques Cartier named the bay Havre sainct Nicollas in 1535. The present name is derived from the Innu language term pishi-shebau. This can be interpreted as meaning "sharp rock" or "dry river".

== Description ==
The Dictionnaire des rivières et lacs de la province de Québec (1914) says,

This watercourse on the north coast of the Saint Lawrence is east of the Corneille River, more than 400 miles downstream from Quebec. It is small but can be mounted fairly easily in a canoe up to the first lake, which is seven miles from the sea. From there, the river is just a stream and cannot carry canoes for a distance of about ten miles, to the large lake three miles in diameter that is the source of this river. The land beside the river is flat and clay, and is suitable for cultivation as far as the first lake. From there, there are only mountains and rocks. The dominant plants, according to the surveyor Hould (1894), are pines and fir. In several places the trees are large enough for commercial use.

== Basin ==
Part of the river basin is in the unorganized territory of Lac-Jérôme and part in the municipality of Aguanish. The river basin covers 154 square kilometres (59 sq mi). It lies between the basins of the Little Watshishou River to the west and the Nabisipi River to the east. A map of the ecological regions of Quebec shows the river basin in sub-regions 6j-T and 6m-T of the east spruce/moss subdomain.

== Sources ==
- Aire de concentration d'oiseaux aquatiques de la Baie Pashashibou in Canada, Protected Planet
- Portrait préliminaire de la zone de gestion intégrée de l'eau par bassin versant Duplessis (PDF) (in French), OBV Duplessis, April 2015, archived from the original (PDF) on 2019-09-02
- Rivière Pashashibou (in French), Commission de toponymie du Québec
- Rivière Pashashibou, Natural Resources Canada
- Rouillard, Eugène (1914), "Pashashibou, (Rivière)", Dictionnaire des rivières et lacs de la province de Québec (in French), Québec. Département des terres et forêts
- Saucier, J.-P.; Robitaille, A.; Grondin, P.; Bergeron, J.-F.; Gosselin, J. (2011), Les régions écologiques du Québec méridional (PDF) (map), 4 (in French), Ministère des Ressources naturelles et de la Faune, archived from the original (PDF) on 2020-06-19
