= Petite rivière Manitou =

- Location within Quebec

Location
- Country: Canada
- Province: Quebec
- Region: Côte-Nord
- RCM: Minganie

Physical characteristics
- Source: Lac non identifié
  - location: Lac-Jérôme
  - coordinates: 50.98426°N 64.99840°W
  - elevation: 698
- Mouth: Manitou River
  - location: Lac-Jérôme
  - coordinates: 50.70722°N 65.17333°W
  - elevation: 279 metres (915 ft)
- Length: 55.1 kilometres (34.2 mi)

Basin features
- River system: Gulf of Saint Lawrence

The Petite rivière Manitou (English: Little Manitou River) is a tributary of Manitou River, flowing in the unorganized territory of Lac-Jérôme, in the Minganie Regional County Municipality, in the administrative region of Côte-Nord, in province of Quebec, in Canada.

This wild territory does not have a motorized access road. The closest route is route 138 which runs along the north shore of the Gulf of St. Lawrence. You can only access this area by seaplane or snowmobile in winter.

== Geography ==
The Little Manitou River originates from an unidentified lake in the unorganized territory of Lac-Jérôme, in the Minganie Regional County Municipality.

The course of the Little Manitou River descends southward between the Sheldrake River (east side) and Manitou River (west side).

From the mouth of Lac de Tête, the course of the Petite Rivière Manitou descends on 55.1 kilometres (34.2 mi), with a drop of 419 metres (1,375 ft), according to the following segments:

Upper course of the Little Manitou River (31.4 kilometres (19.5 mi) segment)

- 5.7 kilometres (3.5 mi) first south, up to a river T, then west, forming a hook to the south; finally by crossing a lake (length: 0.6 kilometres (0.37 mi); altitude: 644 m (2,113 ft)) towards the south, to its mouth;
- 3.9 kilometres (2.4 mi) towards the southwest, first crossing a lake (length: 0.7 kilometres (0.43 mi); altitude: 644 metres (2,113 ft)), then crossing the western end of a second lake, up to a bend in the river, corresponding to the discharge (coming from the east) of a small lake;
- 7.2 kilometres (4.5 mi) westward first, crossing four small lakes, then forming a few hooks, especially in areas of rapids, up to a bend in the river;
- 6.4 kilometres (4.0 mi) towards the south in an increasingly deep valley, forming a small hook towards the west, then descending relatively in a straight line, until a bend of the river corresponding to the discharge (coming from the west) of a set of lakes;
- 8.2 kilometres (5.1 mi) towards the south, crossing a lake (length: 3.3 kilometres (2.1 mi); altitude: 462 metres (1,516 ft)), to its mouth;

Lower course of the Little Manitou River (segment of 23.7 kilometres (14.7 mi))

- 2.7 kilometres (1.7 mi) towards the east forming a hook towards the south, then again towards the east, until the discharge (coming from the north) of a river;
- 8.6 kilometres (5.3 mi) towards the south, crossing an unidentified lake (length: 2.0 kilometres (1.2 mi); altitude: 455 metres (1,493 ft)) over its full length, up to a bend in the river; then east to a bend in the river corresponding to the discharge (coming from the east) of a lake;
- 5.2 kilometres (3.2 mi) towards the south-east in a deep valley, to a bend in the river, corresponding to the discharge (coming from the west) of a lake;
- 3.3 kilometres (2.1 mi) towards the south-east, to a bend in the river corresponding to the discharge (coming from the east) of a lake;
- 3.9 kilometres (2.4 mi) towards the south, first forming a loop towards the north, a large S, a loop towards the south, then orienting towards the southeast, until its mouth.

The Little Manitou River empties on the north shore of the Manitou River, either 0.55 kilometres (0.34 mi) upstream from Lac du Canot and 4.9 kilometres (3.0 mi) downstream from lake Manitou. This confluence is located 46 kilometres (29 mi) northwest of the confluence of the Manitou River with the Gulf of St. Lawrence.

From the mouth of the Little Manitou River, the current follows the course of the Manitou River over 36.4 km (22.6 mi) to flow onto the north shore of Gulf of St. Lawrence.

== Toponymy ==
The toponym "Petite rivière Manitou" is linked to the toponym "rivière Manitou" of which it is a tributary.

The toponym “Petite rivière Manitou” was made official on December 5, 1968.

== See also ==
- Minganie Regional County Municipality
- Lac-Jérôme, a TNO
- Manitou River
