= Saint-Jean North-East River =

Saint-Jean North-East River Rivière Saint-Jean Nord-Est (French)
- Location within Quebec

Location
- Country: Canada
- Province: Quebec
- Region: Côte-Nord
- RCM: Minganie

Physical characteristics
- Source: Charpeney Lake
  - location: Lac-Jérôme
  - elevation: 541
- Mouth: Gulf of Saint Lawrence
  - coordinates: 50.283333°N 64.334444°W
  - elevation: 0 metres (0 ft)
- Length: 70.4 kilometres (43.7 mi)

Basin features
- Progression: Saint-Jean River, Gulf of Saint Lawrence

The Saint-Jean North-East River (French: Rivière Saint-Jean Nord-Est) is a tributary of the north shore of the Saint-Jean River, flowing in the unorganized territory of Lac-Jérôme, in the Minganie Regional County Municipality, in the administrative region of Côte-Nord, in province of Quebec, Canada.

== Geography ==
The course of the North-East Saint-Jean river descends from the north, between the Mingan River and Mingan North-West River (located on the east side), as well as the Saint-Jean River (located on the west side).

The Saint-Jean Nord-Est River has its source at Charpeney Lake (length: 6.7 km (4.2 mi); altitude: 541 m (1,775 ft)), enclosed between the mountains, in the unorganized territory of Lac-Jérôme. This lake has two parts separated from each other by the Kauapauakaht Pass. This lake is fed in particular by five discharges (coming from the east) of streams, by the discharge (coming from the south) of the Fauteux lake, at:

- 74.4 km (46.2 mi) southeast of the boundary between Labrador and Quebec;
- 46.7 km (29.0 mi) north of the mouth of the Rivière Saint-Jean Nord-Est;
- 31.2 km (19.4 mi) southwest of a curve in the Romaine River;
- 95.7 km (59.5 mi) north-west of downtown Havre-Saint-Pierre.

From the mouth of Charpeney Lake, the course of the Saint-Jean Northeast River descends on 70.4 km (43.7 mi), with a drop of 490 m (1,610 ft), depending on the segments following:

Upper course of the Saint John River Northeast (segment of 8.2 km (5.1 mi))

- 4.7 km (2.9 mi) towards the north, crossing consecutively a first lake (length: 1.3 km (0.81 mi); altitude: 541 m (1,775 ft)); a second lake (length: 2.8 km (1.7 mi); altitude: 539 m (1,768 ft)); a third lake (length: 0.9 km (0.56 mi); altitude: 538 m (1,765 ft) which has an island in its center and a peninsula) and collects a stream (coming from the north-west ), up to its mouth;
- 3.5 km (2.2 mi) first to the north in an increasingly deep valley, up to a bend in the river; then east across the Portage Kapapuanapestshepant, as well as across a lake formed by the widening of the river, to its mouth. Note: this lake receives the discharge (coming from the north-west) of Lac des Caps;

Intermediate course of the North-East Saint-Jean River (downstream of the Lac des Caps outlet) (20.5 km (12.7 mi) segment)

- 7.0 km (4.3 mi) first east to a bend in the river; then to the south, crossing successively three bodies of water (formed by the outgrowth of the river) whose altitude of the first two is 434 m (1,424 ft) and the last 432 m (1,417 ft) which is rather misshapen, up to the mouth of the latter. In this segment, the river collects the discharge (coming from the northeast) of a set of lakes; while the third lake receives on the east side the discharge of a set of lakes;
- 7.8 km (4.8 mi) towards the south-east in a deep valley, first forming an easterly curve around a mountain, collecting the discharge (coming from the north-east) of two lakes, crossing a few series of rapids to a bend in the river (corresponding to the discharge (coming from the north) of a set of lakes) where the current bypasses two islands, then southwards crossing a lake (length: 0.6 km (0.37 mi); altitude: 390 m (1,280 ft)), up to its mouth;
- 5.7 km (3.5 mi) towards the south-east in a deep valley, passing the west side of Mount Uhukanatshehu, collecting the discharge (coming from the south-west) of a set of lakes, collecting a stream (coming from the northeast), collecting the discharge (coming from the southwest) of a lake, collecting the discharge (coming from the north) of a lake, curving towards the south where it crosses a few series of rapids, then south-west, to the confluence of the brook of Antan (coming from the west);

Intermediate course of the Saint John River Northeast (segment of 19.7 km (12.2 mi))

- 7.5 km (4.7 mi) southward in a deep valley, collecting a stream (coming from the northwest), collecting a stream (coming from the northeast), collecting discharge (coming from the west) of a set of lakes, and collecting discharge (coming from the east) of some small lakes, up to a river bend (corresponding to a stream (coming from the east);
- 7.8 km (4.8 mi) towards the south-west collecting 4 streams (coming from the west), collecting 3 discharges from lakes (coming from the south-east), up to a bend in the river (corresponding at the outlet (coming from the south-east) of a set of small lakes)); forming a loop to the north,
- 4.4 km (2.7 mi) first towards the west collecting the discharge (coming from the north) of some small lakes, as well as a stream (coming from the south); then to the south-west, collecting the discharge (coming from the north-west) of two small lakes, crossing the Kakahtshekauh Rapids, forming a loop to the south; collecting a small river (coming from the north), up to the confluence of a river (coming from the north-west);

Lower St. John River Northeast (22.0 km (13.7 mi) segment)

- 8.6 km (5.3 mi) towards the south first in a small forest valley, then in a deep valley, collecting a stream (coming from the northeast), passing at the foot of the Kaiamehenant Cliff (located on the west shore), collecting the discharge (coming from the northeast) of two lakes, curving towards the southwest, collecting the discharge (coming from the northwest) of two lakes, passing the place - said Uhukanatshehu (located on the mountainside on the east bank), up to a bend in the river;
- 6.7 km (4.2 mi) first towards the south, first forming a curve towards the west, in a deep valley, collecting the discharge (coming from the north) of some lakes, passing the Elbow Kanatuapiaht, collecting discharge (coming from the northwest) of a lake, forming a small hook to the west, collecting a stream (coming from the north), collecting the Uhtshisk stream (coming from the north), forming a loop west near the end of the segment, to the river? (coming from the west);
- 6.7 km (4.2 mi) southward in a deep valley, forming a large loop eastward around a mountain, crossing a series of rapids, to its mouth.

The Rivière Saint-Jean Nord-Est flows into a bend in the river on the north bank of the Rivière Saint-Jean. This confluence is located at:

- 59.5 km (37.0 mi) northwest of the center of the village of Havre-Saint-Pierre;
- 49.4 km (30.7 mi) north of the mouth of the Saint John River;
- 172.8 km (107.4 mi) north-west of downtown Sept-Îles.

From this confluence, the current descends the Saint John River on 65.7 km (40.8 mi) towards the south to flow on the north shore of the Gulf of St. Lawrence, that is to say in the Jacques Cartier Strait.

== Toponymy ==
The toponym "Rivière Saint-Jean Nord-Est" was made official on December 5, 1968, at the Place Names Bank of the Commission de toponymie du Québec.

== See also ==
- List of rivers of Quebec
