= Lake Manitou (Lac-Jérôme) =

Lake in Quebec, Canada

Manitou Lake
- Lac Manitou
- Location within Quebec
- Location: Lac-Jérôme, Minganie RCM, Quebec
- Coordinates: 50.87361°N 65.28778°W
- Max. length: 25 kilometres (16 mi)
- Max. width: 2 kilometres (1.2 mi)
- Surface area: 41.7 square kilometres (16.1 sq mi)

Lake Manitou (French: Lac Manitou) is a lake located in the unorganized territory of Lac-Jérôme, in the Minganie Regional County Municipality, in the Côte-Nord, in the province of Quebec, Canada. The Manitou River flows through the lake from north to south, and continues to the Gulf of Saint Lawrence.

== Location ==
It is one of three large lakes on the Manitou River, the others being Aigle Lake in the north and Eudist Lake in the south. It is in the center-south of the Manitou River basin and covers 41.7 square kilometres (16.1 sq mi). The lake is almost 25 kilometres (16 mi) long but only 1–2 kilometres (0.62–1.24 mi) wide, formed by flooding an old trough-shaped glacial valley with steep sides that rise to over 500 metres (1,600 ft) in places. The lake is 75 kilometres (47 mi) from the river's mouth. It is accessible only by float plane.

== Environment ==
A map of the ecological regions of Quebec shows the lake is in sub-region 6j-S of the east spruce/moss subdomain.

== Fish ==
The Pourvoirie Mabec provides outfitting services for fishing and hunting on and around the lake. The Pourvoirie Mabec has exclusive rights. Eugène Rouillard wrote in 1908 that trout were abundant in the Manitou River and Lake Manitou, with a length of 25 to 30 inches (640 to 760 mm). Brook trout are often over 2 pounds (0.91 kg), and Arctic char are often over 4 pounds (1.8 kg). A survey of the Innu population of Mingan in 2007 reported that many of them practiced both ice fishing and summer fishing on the lake.

== Sources ==
- Cabana, Julien (19 June 2012), "Mouchetées géantes au lac Manitou", Journal de Montréal (in French)
- Complexe de la Romaine, Étude d’impact sur l’environnement (PDF) (in French), vol. 5 Milieu humain – Minganie, Hydro-Québec Production, December 2007
- Lac Manitou, Natural Resources Canada
- Monfette, Richard (February 2019), Des gagnants à la pourvoirie Mabec (PDF) (in French)
- Portrait du bassin versant Manitou (in French), OBV Duplessis
- Rouillard, Eugène (1908), La côte nord du Saint-Laurent et le Labrador canadien (in French)
- Saucier, J.-P.; Robitaille, A.; Grondin, P.; Bergeron, J.-F.; Gosselin, J. (2011), Les régions écologiques du Québec méridional (PDF) (map), 4 (in French), Ministère des Ressources naturelles et de la Faune, archived from the original (PDF) on 2020-06-19
- Théberge, Claude (August 2008), Étude de mise en valeur des rivières – Phase 1 MRC de la Minganie (PDF) (in French), Genivar
