= Charpeney Lake =

Lake in Quebec, Canada

- Location within Quebec
- Location: Lac-Jérôme, Minganie Regional County Municipality (RCM), Côte-Nord, Quebec, Canada
- Coordinates: 51°03′56″N 63°51′45″W
- Type: Natural
- Primary inflows: (clockwise from the mouth); Five streams (from East); outlet of Fauteux Lake (from South)
- Primary outflows: Saint-Jean North-East River
- Basin countries: Canada
- Max. length: 6.7 kilometres (4.2 mi)
- Max. width: 1.6 kilometres (0.99 mi)
- Surface elevation: 541 metres (1,775 ft)

Charpeney Lake is the main body of fresh water at the head of the Saint-Jean North-East River (slope of the Saint-Jean River), flowing in the unorganized territory of Lac-Jérôme, in the Minganie Regional County Municipality, in the administrative region of Côte-Nord, in the province of Quebec, in Canada.

== Geography ==
Lake Charpeney has a length of 6.7 km (4.2 mi), a maximum width of 1.6 km (0.99 mi) in its northern part and an altitude of 541 m (1,775 ft). This lake between the mountains, in the unorganized territory of Lac-Jérôme, has two parts separated from each other by the Kauapauakaht Pass. This lake is fed in particular by five discharges (coming from the east) of streams, by the discharge (coming from the south) of the Fauteux lake.

The mouth of Lake Charpeney is located at:

- 74.4 km (46.2 mi) southeast of the boundary between Labrador and Quebec;
- 46.7 km (29.0 mi) north of the mouth of the Rivière Saint-Jean Nord-Est;
- 31.2 km (19.4 mi) southwest of a curve in the La Romaine River;
- 95.7 km (59.5 mi) north-west of downtown Havre-Saint-Pierre.

Lake Charpeney flows into its northeastern part. From the mouth of Charpeney Lake, the current descends the course of the Saint-Jean North-East River over 70.4 km (43.7 mi), then the course of the Saint-Jean River (Minganie) on 65.7 km (40.8 mi), which empties on the north shore of Gulf of St. Lawrence.

== Toponymy ==
The term "Charpeney" and its variant "Charpenay" turn out to be a French family name. There is a Charpeney township on the North Shore, in Quebec.

The toponym "Lac Charpeney" was formalized on December 5, 1968, by the Commission de toponymie du Québec, that is to say with the creation of this commission.

== See also ==
- Saint-Jean North-East River, a stream
- Minganie Regional County Municipality
- Lac-Jérôme, an unorganized territory (Canada)
- List of lakes in Canada
