= Sheldrake River (Minganie) =

Sheldrake River Rivière Sheldrake
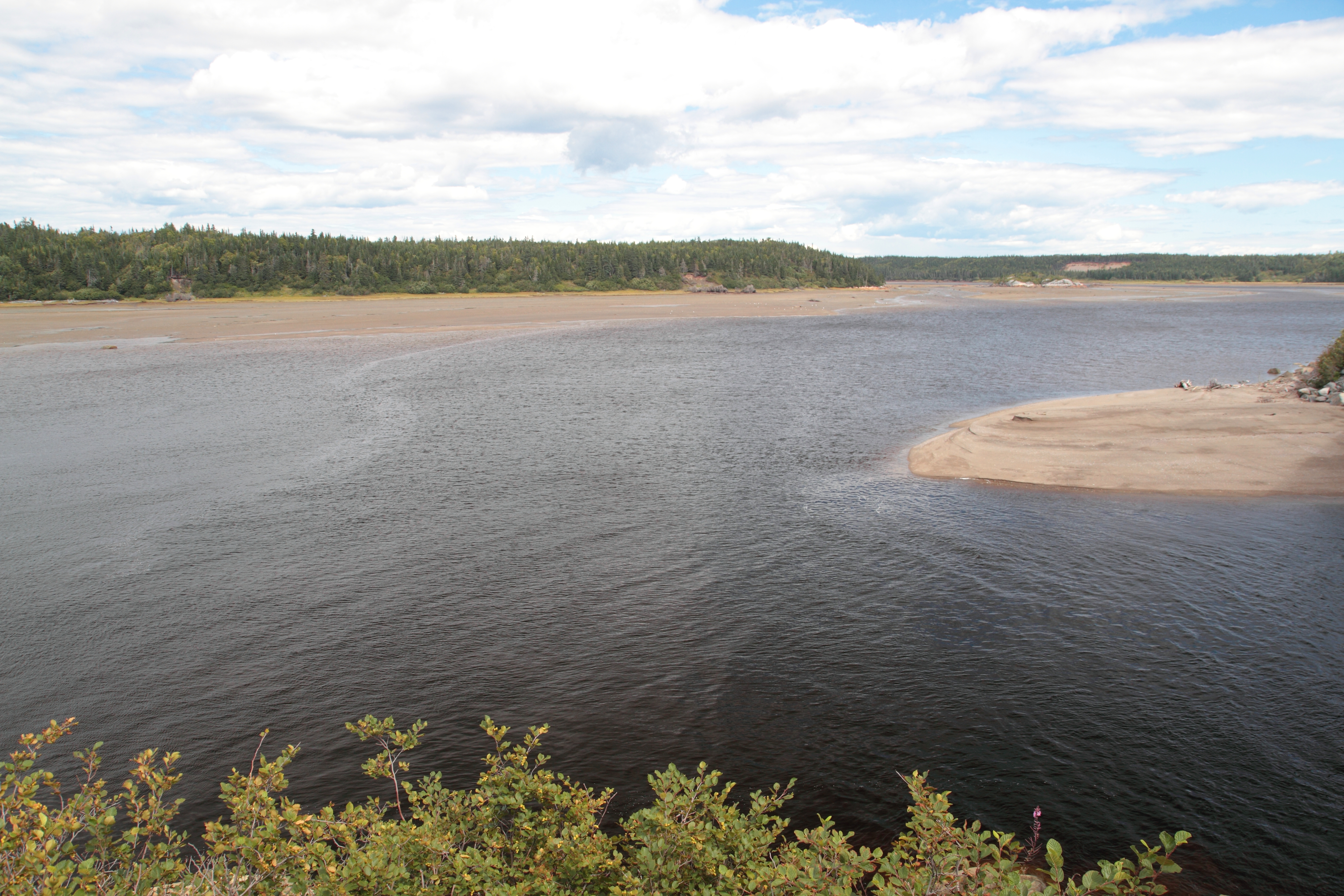
- The river near its mouth, from Quebec Route 138

- Location within Quebec
- Native name: Manto Sipo (Innu)

Location
- Country: Canada
- Province: Quebec
- Region: Côte-Nord
- RCM: Minganie

Physical characteristics
- Mouth: Gulf of Saint Lawrence
  - coordinates: 50.271667°N 64.929167°W
  - elevation: 0 metres (0 ft)
- Length: 106 kilometres (66 mi)
- Basin size: 1,183 square kilometres (457 sq mi)

The Sheldrake River (French: Rivière Sheldrake) is a river in the Côte-Nord region of Quebec, Canada. It flows into the Gulf of Saint Lawrence. There is a 25 MW hydroelectric power station on the river.

== Location ==
The Sheldrake River rises between Lake Manitou and Lake Magpie in a mountainous area where the peaks reach heights of almost 850 metres (2,790 ft). The river flows south in a winding course of 106 kilometres (66 mi), with a series of waterfalls and rapids. The East Sheldrake River, a tributary, joins the main river about 30 kilometres (19 mi) upstream from its mouth. It enters the Saint Lawrence to the west of the village of Sheldrake, halfway between Sept-Îles and Havre-Saint-Pierre. The entrance to the river is blocked to vessels of any size by a shifting sandbar and a steel bridge. The mouth of the river is in the municipality of Rivière-au-Tonnerre in the Minganie Regional County Municipality.

P.J. Touzel, from Jersey, was the first European to settle on the Sheldrake in 1851, where he founded a large fishing station. Lake Touzel, on the course of the Sheldrake river, is named after him.

== Name ==
The Innu call the river Manto Sipo, or Manitou River, after the Manitou spirit or life force. They call the Manitou River, 25 kilometres (16 mi) to the west, Manto Sipis, or Little Manitou River. The river is shown as "Sheldrake R." on the 1829 map of the Saint Lawrence by William Sax. The 1833 map by Captain Bayfield calls it "Sawbill". Sheldrake (Tadorna) and Sawbill (Mergus) are both waterfowl in the family Anatidae. The Innu call the Tonnerre River, about 10 kilometres (6.2 mi) to the east, Ursuk Sipo, meaning "Sawbill River".

== Hydroelectric project ==
A hydroelectric power station on the "Courbe du Sault" section of the river was proposed in the early 2000s. It would have a maximum capacity of 25 MW. In September 2007 it was decided that an environmental assessment was needed. In April 2011 it was found that project was unlikely to cause significant adverse environmental effects. In August 2011 it was reported that work had started in March 2010 and the plant was expected to be commissioned by early December 2012.

== Basin ==
The Sheldrake River basin is partially in the unorganized territory of Lac-Jérôme, partly in the municipality of Rivière-au-Tonnerre. The river basin covers 1,183 square kilometres (457 sq mi). It lies between the basins of the Chaloupe River to the west and the Tonnerre River to the east. A map of the ecological regions of Quebec shows the river basin in sub-regions 6j-T and 6m-T of the east spruce/moss subdomain.

== Salmon repopulation ==
In June 2015 the municipality of Rivière-au-Tonnerre signed an agreement with Université Laval to repopulate the salmon of the Sheldrake River. Fishing had been banned since 2002 due to the critically low number of salmon, and the Ministry of Wildlife carried out a study on how to revitalize the river. The ministry planned to start capturing smolts in the Corneille River, a tributary of the Sheldrake, in 2016. They would be sent to the Tadoussac fish station and to Laval University to be kept until they reached adult size. Roe would be collected and placed in incubators in the Sheldrake electric minicentral. The fry would then be placed in the Sheldrake River. On 9 July 2015 over 89,000 juvenile salmon were released upstream from the impassable Courbe du Sault, a waterfall.

The salmon seeding program was part of the Côte-Nord Atlantic Salmon Habitat Enhancement Program, created as part of the La Romaine hydroelectric complex construction project, a partnership between Hydro-Québec, the Ministry of the Environment, the Ministry of Forests, Wildlife and Parks (MFFP) and the Quebec Federation for Atlantic Salmon. The municipality of Rivière-au-Tonnerre was providing some of the financing and management. The Baie-Trinité Development Corporation was to contribute 200 smolts captured in the Trinité River, which would be raised to the breeding adult stage at Tadoussac and the Aquatic Sciences Research Laboratory at Laval University. Five vertical incubators were to be installed at the Sheldrake River hydroelectric facility, with a capacity of 275,000 eggs per year.

== Sources ==
- Cellier, François G. (1 August 2011), "25 MW sur la rivière Sheldrake", Portail Constructo (in French)
- Construction of a hydroelectric power station on Rivière Sheldrake (Courbe du Sault sector), Canadian Environmental Assessment Agency
- Le saumon sera réintroduit dans la rivière Sheldrake (in French), Radio Canada, 11 June 2015
- Portrait préliminaire de la zone de gestion intégrée de l'eau par bassin versant Duplessis (PDF) (in French), OBV Duplessis, April 2015
- Rivière Sheldrake (in French), Commission de toponymie du Québec
- Rivière Sheldrake, Natural Resources Canada
- Rouillard, Eugène (1914), "Touzel, (Lac)", Dictionnaire des rivières et lacs de la province de Québec (in French), Québec. Département des terres et forêts
- Saucier, J.-P.; Robitaille, A.; Grondin, P.; Bergeron, J.-F.; Gosselin, J. (2011), Les régions écologiques du Québec méridional (PDF) (map), 4 (in French), Ministère des Ressources naturelles et de la Faune
- "Saumon atlantique: La rivière Sheldrake sera ensemencée durant six ans", Le Nord-Côtier (in French), 19 August 2015
