= Chaloupe River =

Chaloupe River Rivière à la Chaloupe
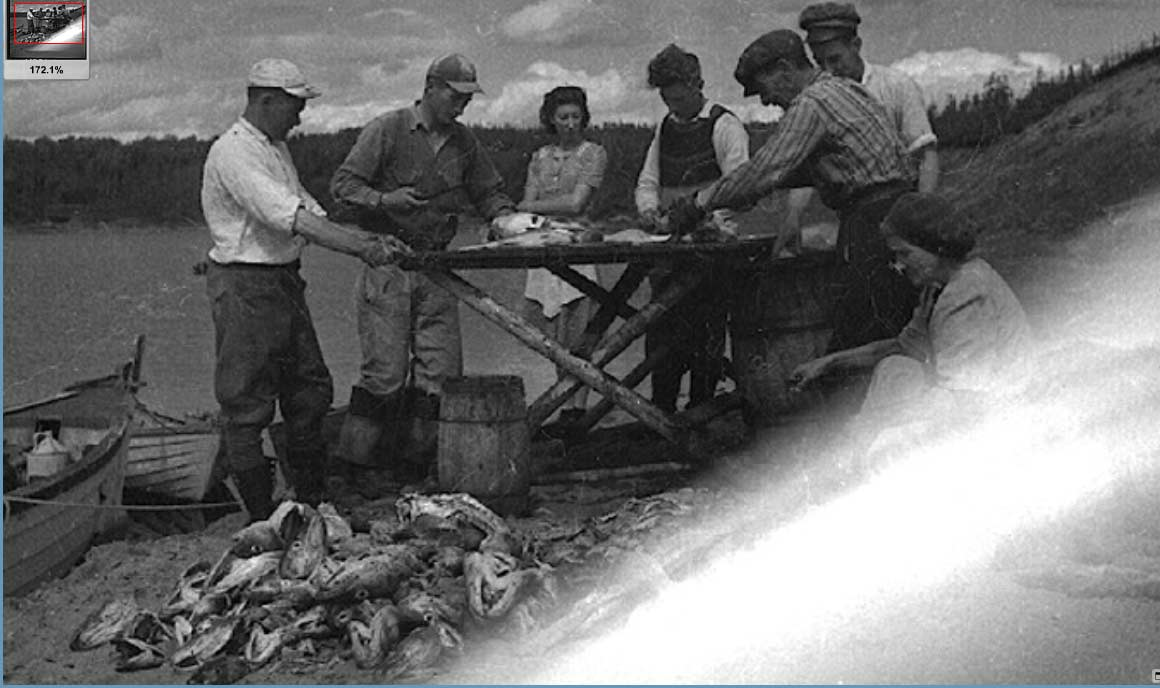
- Slicing cod in Rivière-à-la-Chaloupe

- Location within Quebec

Location
- Country: Canada
- Province: Quebec
- Region: Côte-Nord
- RCM: Minganie

Physical characteristics
- Mouth: Gulf of Saint Lawrence
  - coordinates: 50.293056°N 65.121944°W
  - elevation: 0 metres (0 ft)
- Length: 32 kilometres (20 mi)
- Basin size: 201 square kilometres (78 sq mi)

The Chaloupe River (French: Rivière à la Chaloupe, Shallop River) is a 32 kilometres (20 mi) river of the Côte-Nord region of Quebec. It flows from north to south and empties into the Gulf of Saint Lawrence.

== Location ==
The mouth of the Chaloupe River is halfway between Sept-Îles and Havre-Saint-Pierre. It flows from north to south. The river can only be navigated in small craft. Tributaries include the Guillaume, Vibert and Robichaud rivers, which are all small. The mouth of the Chaloupe River is in the municipality of Rivière-au-Tonnerre in the Minganie Regional County Municipality. The hamlet of Rivière-à-la-Chaloupe is on the east of the river's estuary.

== Name ==
A chaloupe is a small French boat such as a lug-rigged fishing boat. The Abbé Huard visited the hamlet of La Chaloupe on the east shore at the end of the 19th century. When he asked what the name meant, he was told it was a river with greater volume than the Rivière aux Graines [nearby to the west], and it is precise to call it the Rivière Chaloupe. He added that boats of this type were much used in these parts, and found an excellent harbor there. An English variant of the name is Shallop River. A peat bog that extends 4 kilometres (2.5 mi) northeast of the hamlet is called the Grande Plaine de la Chaloupe.

== Description ==
The Dictionnaire des rivières et lacs de la province de Québec (1914) describes the river as,

Small watercourse of the north coast of the Saint Lawrence, in Saguenay County. Its source is about 25 miles from its mouth, but navigation in canoes is obstructed by the falls and rapids that are found in the last seven or eight miles. The savages, according to the surveyor C.C. Duberger (report of 1861), do not use this river to reach the interior. In winter the inhabitants of the region go to its source and there find game in abundance. The soil is poor and the small trees are only useful for burning. It has many small tributaries: the rivers Bonne, Porc-Epic, Hilaire, Vibert, Robichaud. There are abundant trout of average size.

== Terrain ==
The coastal plain along the Gulf of Saint Lawrence is 2 kilometres (1.2 mi) wide in this region, with relatively flat terrain rising gradually to 100 metres (330 ft) of elevation in the north. The Goldthwait Sea deposited large amounts of clay and silt on the plain, later covered by deltaic sandy sediments. Most of the basin is in the piedmont region of rounded rocky hills, with average altitude increasing to 400 metres (1,300 ft) in the north. The highest point is 488 metres (1,601 ft) high in the northern end. The bedrock is undeformed magmatic rock. The north part is an anorthositic massif. The south is granitoid orthopyroxene and an assemblage of granite and pegmatite. In the piedmont the rock is covered with a thin layer of glacial till less than 2 metres (6 ft 7 in) thick, with areas of exposed rock on the hills and valley walls. An old U-shaped valley in the north of the watershed holds some glaciofluvial deposits.

== Basin ==
The Chaloupe River basin is partially in the unorganized territory of Lac-Jérôme (74.8%), partly in the municipality of Rivière-au-Tonnerre (25.2%). It covers 201 square kilometres (78 sq mi). It is elongated, with north-south length of 26 kilometres (16 mi) and an average east-west width of 10 kilometres (6.2 mi). It lies between the basins of the Manitou River to the west and the Sheldrake River to the east. The 84.1 hectares (208 acres) Lake Vibert, at the source of the Vibert River, is the only lake of any size. Water bodies cover 2.37 of the river basin, and ombrotrophic peatlands cover 2.18%.

The streams and rivers follow angular courses dictated by fractures in the bedrock, with straight line sections and right-angled junctions. In the downstream section of the Chaloupe in the south of the piedmont section the river winds through its alluvial sediments, and in the coastal plain it meanders. There is a 1 kilometre (0.62 mi) estuary at the river mouth with several channels and shoals. The river is 32 kilometres (20 mi) from north to south, with a vertical drop of 305 metres (1,001 ft). The annual average flow at its mouth is estimated at 7.5 cubic metres per second (260 cu ft/s). Flow varies during the year from 1.6 to 18 cubic metres per second (57 to 636 cu ft/s).

== Environment ==
The Rivière-au-Tonnerre weather station is 24 kilometres (15 mi) east of the river mouth. It records an average annual temperature of 1.1 °C (34.0 °F) and average annual precipitation of 1,080 millimetres (43 in). A map of the ecological regions of Quebec shows the river in sub-regions 6j-T and 6m-T of the east spruce/moss subdomain. Black spruce (Picea mariana) dominate the forests on the coastal plain, while the piedmont area has mixed black spruce and balsam fir (Abies balsamea). In the past there has been heavy logging in the lower part of the river basin. In the late 1990s and early 2000s there was a major infestation of hemlock looper (Lambdina fiscellaria) moths, which caused large scale defoliation of the firs. Fish in the river consist of brook trout (Salvelinus fontinalis), American eel (Anguilla rostrata) and rainbow smelt (Osmerus mordax).

There is no wildlife sanctuary, controlled use zone or outfitter in the watershed. The Aire de concentration d'oiseaux aquatiques de la Rivière aux Graines, Anse à Georges (River Aux Graines – George's Cove water fowl gathering area), a 9.28 square kilometres (3.58 sq mi) IUCN Management Category IV protected area, extends along the coast at the river mouth and includes the estuary.

== Sources ==
- Aire de concentration d'oiseaux aquatiques de la Rivière aux Graines, Anse à Georges in Canada, Protected Planet
- "Definition of chaloupe", Merriam-Webster
- Portrait du bassin versant à la Chaloupe (PDF) (in French), OBV Duplessis
- Portrait préliminaire de la zone de gestion intégrée de l'eau par bassin versant Duplessis (PDF) (in French), OBV Duplessis, April 2015
- Rivière à la Chaloupe (in French), Commission de toponymie du Québec
- Rivière à la Chaloupe, Natural Resources Canada
- Rouillard, Eugène (1914), "Chaloupe, (Rivière)", Dictionnaire des rivières et lacs de la province de Québec (in French), Québec. Département des terres et forêts
- Saucier, J.-P.; Robitaille, A.; Grondin, P.; Bergeron, J.-F.; Gosselin, J. (2011), Les régions écologiques du Québec méridional (PDF) (map), 4 (in French), Ministère des Ressources naturelles et de la Faune, archived from the original (PDF) on 2020-06-19
