= Tortue River =

Tortue River Rivière Tortue
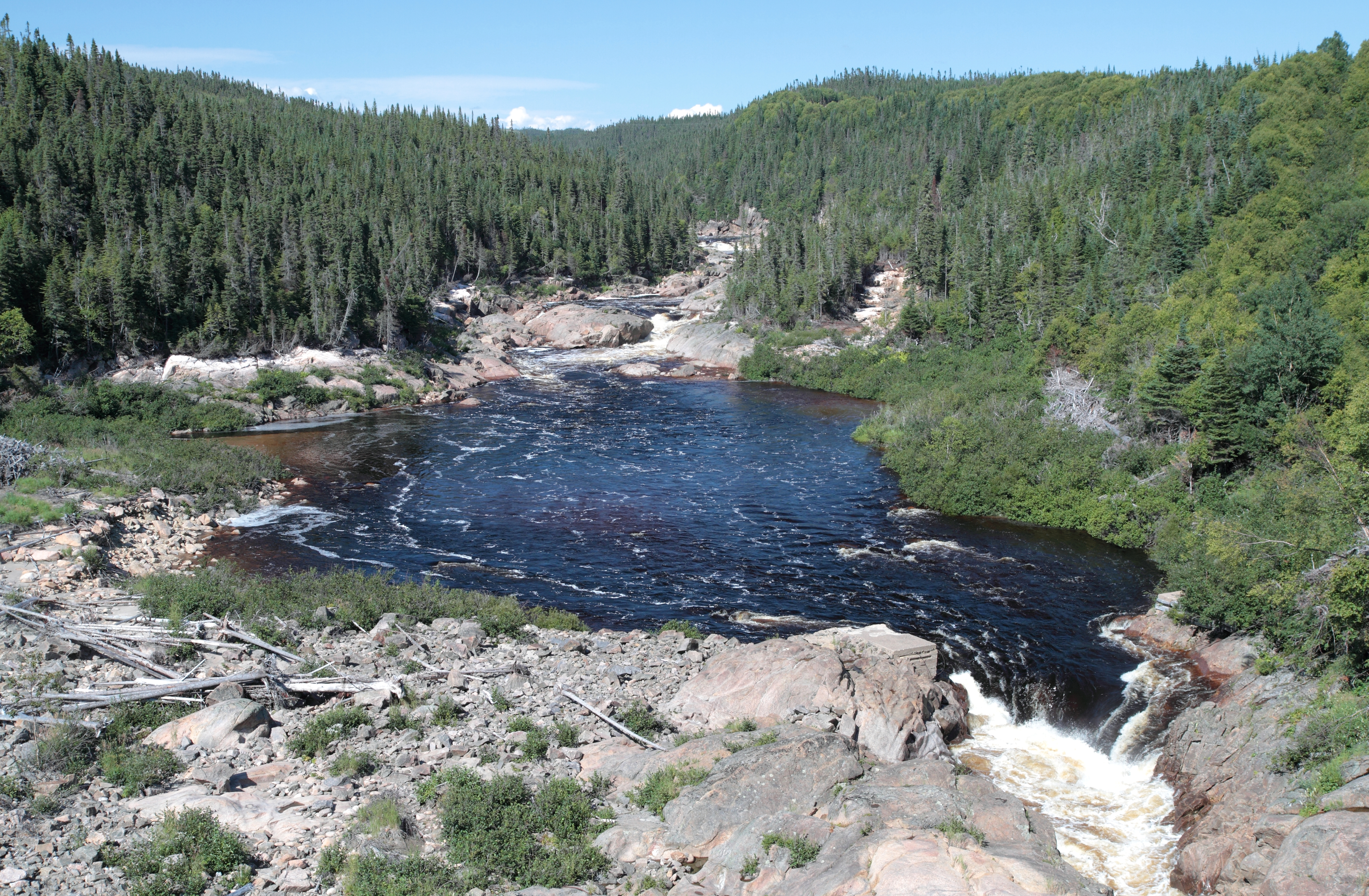
- The river near its mouth, looking north from Quebec Route 138

- Location within Quebec

Location
- Country: Canada
- Province: Quebec
- Region: Côte-Nord
- RCM: Minganie; Sept-Rivières Regional County Municipality

Physical characteristics
- Source: Lake Tortue
  - location: Rivière-Nipissis
  - coordinates: 50.924719°N 65.506111°W
  - elevation: 620 m (2,030 ft)
- Mouth: Gulf of Saint Lawrence
  - location: Rivière-au-Tonnerre
  - coordinates: 50.300833°N 65.374167°W
  - elevation: 0 metres (0 ft)
- Length: 79.4 km (49.3 mi)
- Basin size: 793 square kilometres (306 sq mi)

Basin features
- Tributaries
  - left: (upstream) seven streams, Philippe-Henley stream, three streams, discharge of a set of small lakes, eight streams, stream (via Lac Élinore), two lake discharges.
  - right: (upstream) four streams, discharge of a set of lakes including Lac Fabien, discharge of a small lake, stream, Petite rivière Tortue, rivière aux Chutes, discharge of a small lake, six streams, rivière aux Îlets, discharge of a small lake, discharge of a set of lakes, three streams, Plat stream.
- Bridges: Route 138

The Tortue River (French: Rivière Tortue; English: Turtle River) is a river in the Côte-Nord administrative region, in the province of Quebec, Canada. The course of this river successively crosses the RCM of:

- Sept-Rivières Regional County Municipality: in unorganized territory of Rivière-Nipissis;
- Minganie Regional County Municipality: in unorganized territory of Lac-Jérôme, then the municipality of Rivière-au-Tonnerre.

It flows into the Gulf of Saint Lawrence.

The southern part of the Tortue River watershed is served by the route 138 which runs along the north shore of the estuary of Saint Lawrence.

== Location ==
The river originates from Turtle Lake (length: 3.5 km (2.2 mi) octopus-shaped; altitude: 620 m (2,030 ft)). This lake has an island in its center-north. It is fed mainly by: (clockwise) the discharge of a small lake, the discharge (coming from the west) of a group of lakes, the discharge (coming from the north) of a lake, a stream (coming from the north), the discharge (coming from the northeast) of a set of lakes, the discharge (coming from the east) of some lakes. The mouth of Tortue Lake is located 14.6 km (9.1 mi) west of a bay in lake Manitou, 19.2 km (11.9 mi) east of lake Nipisso and 67.0 km (41.6 mi) northwest of the north shore of the Gulf of St. Lawrence.

The river flows more or less in parallel to the west of the Manitou River and to the east of the Bouleau River.

The Tortue River flows on 79.4 km (49.3 mi) towards the south, with a drop of 620 m (2,030 ft), according to the following segments:

Upper course of the Turtle River (segment of 27.3 km (17.0 mi))

- 14.0 km (8.7 mi) first to the south, crossing a lake (altitude: 621 m (2,037 ft)), then to the southwest; finally, to the south, crossing Lake Eliniore (length: 1.7 km (1.1 mi); altitude: 494 m (1,621 ft)) to the south-east, to its mouth;
- 13.3 km (8.3 mi) towards the south-east in a deep valley and down the mountain, forming a hook towards the south at the end of the segment, to the confluence of the rivière aux Îlets (coming from the west);

Lower course of the Turtle River (segment of 21.6 km (13.4 mi))

- 7.6 km (4.7 mi) first south, curving east, until a bend in the river, corresponding to a stream (coming from the northeast);
- 14.0 km (8.7 mi) first to the south, then to the southeast, to a bend in the river (corresponding to a stream (coming from the east), then to the west, to the confluence of the rivière aux Chutes (coming from the west);
- 10.0 km (6.2 mi) towards the south-west, forming a few streamers, until the confluence of the Petite rivière Tortue (coming from the north-west);

Lower course of the Turtle River (segment of 30.5 km (19.0 mi))

- 12.0 km (7.5 mi) towards the south-east, forming a few coils and collecting the discharge (coming from the west) of Lake Fabien, up to the Philippe-Henley stream (coming from the north-east);
- 18.5 km (11.5 mi) towards the southeast, collecting five streams on the northeast side and passing under the route 138 bridge, up to its mouth.

The mouth of the Tortue River is in the municipality of Rivière-au-Tonnerre in the Minganie Regional County Municipality. A painted metal bridge carries Quebec Route 138 over the river nears its mouth.

== Toponymy ==
The origin of the name is unknown. It was made official on 5 December 1968. The names of local European settlers are reflected in Moïse Maher Lake, located between the Manitou River and the Tortue River, and in the Ruisseau Philippe Henley, a tributary of the Tortue river.

== Basin ==
Part of the river basin is in the unorganized territories of Rivière-Nipissis and Lac-Jérôme and part in the municipality of Rivière-au-Tonnerre. The river basin covers 793 square kilometres (306 sq mi). It lies between the basins of the Sault Plat River to the west and the Manitou River to the east. A map of the ecological regions of Quebec shows the river basin in sub-regions 6j-T and 6m-T of the east spruce/moss subdomain.

== Sources ==
- Des noms, pour se souvenir (in French), Rivière-aux-Graines
- Peinture de la structure métallique du pont de la rivière Tortue sur la route 138 (Rivière-au-Tonnerre), SEAO, 28 February 2018
- Portrait préliminaire de la zone de gestion intégrée de l'eau par bassin versant Duplessis (PDF) (in French), OBV Duplessis, April 2015
- Rivière Tortue (in French), Commission de toponymie du Québec
- Rivière Tortue, Natural Resources Canada
- Saucier, J.-P.; Robitaille, A.; Grondin, P.; Bergeron, J.-F.; Gosselin, J. (2011), Les régions écologiques du Québec méridional (PDF) (map), 4 (in French), Ministère des Ressources naturelles et de la Faune
