= Eudist (disambiguation) =

Eudist is a member of the Congregation of Jesus and Mary, a Society of Apostolic Life in the Roman Catholic Church.

Eudist may also refer to:

- Eudist Servants of the 11th Hour, a religious community in Tijuana, Mexico, founded by Antonia Brenner
- Eudist Lake (French: Lac des Eudistes), a lake in the Côte-Nord region, in Quebec, Canada

== See also ==
- Eudes (disambiguation)
