= Manitou River (Quebec) =

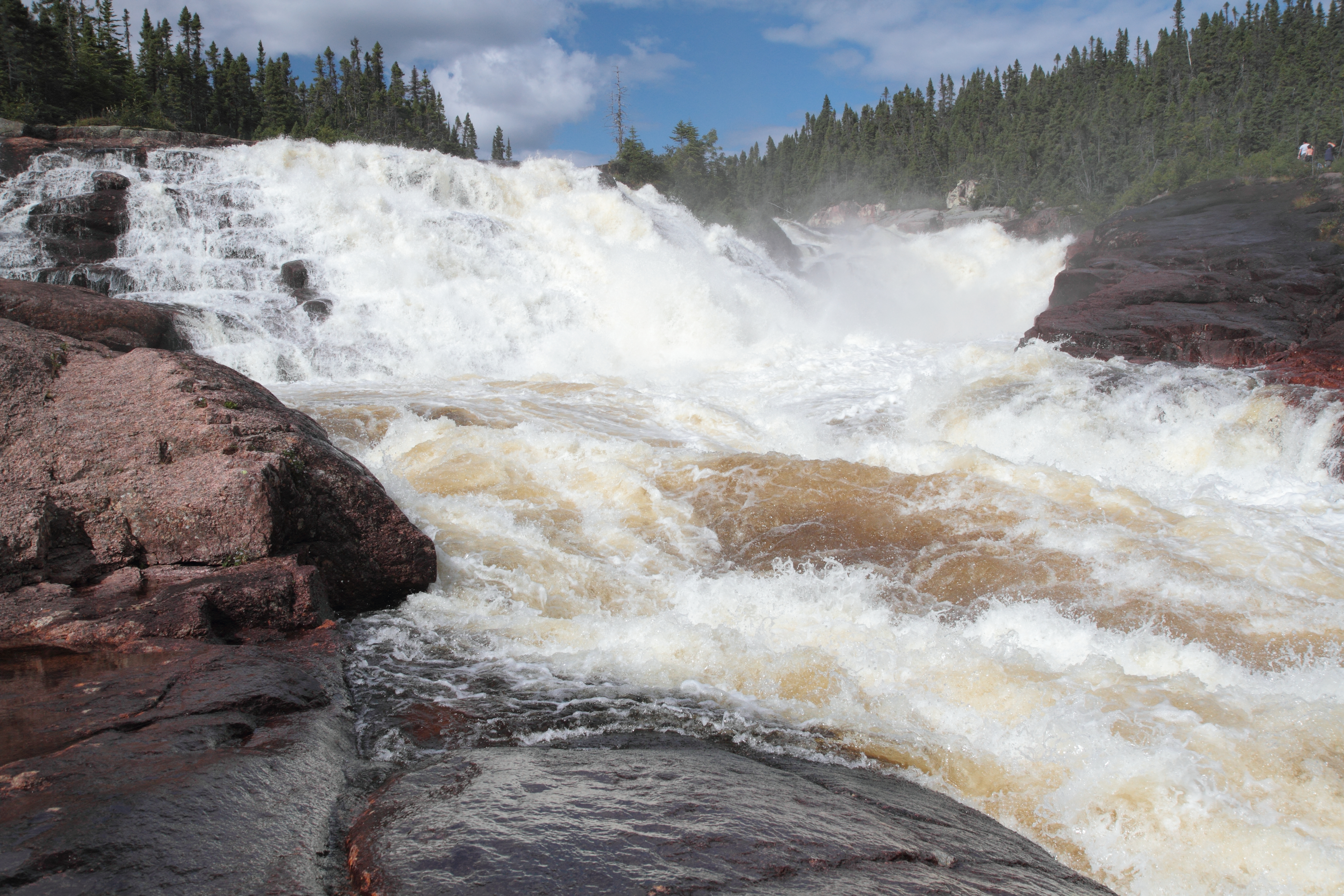
- Falls on Manitou river

- Location within Quebec
- Native name: Rivière Manitou (French)

Location
- Country: Canada
- Province: Quebec
- Region: Côte-Nord
- RCM: Minganie

Physical characteristics
- Source: Lac Caobus
  - location: Lac-Jérôme
  - coordinates: 51.35177°N 65.46590°W
  - elevation: 584
- Mouth: Gulf of Saint Lawrence
  - location: Rivière-du-Tonnerre
  - coordinates: 50.29778°N 65.24139°W
  - elevation: 0 metres (0 ft)
- Length: 148 kilometres (92 mi)
- Basin size: 2,642 square kilometres (1,020 sq mi)
- Discharge
  - average: 79 cubic metres per second (2,800 cu ft/s)

Basin features
- River system: Gulf of Saint Lawrence
- Tributaries
  - left: (upstream) discharge of Lac à la Truite (via Eudist lake), discharge of lake Brézel, Petite rivière Manitou, 17 discharges (via lake Manitou), 16 discharges of a set of lakes.
  - right: (upstream) ruisseau à Marcel, discharge of a set of lakes, discharge of lac à Farine and lac à Goémon, discharge of lake Rond (via lake Manitou), rivière à la Truite (via lake Manitou), discharge of Lac à Nazaire (via lake des Eudistes), ruisseau de l'Épinette (via lake des Eudistes), Lavaivre River (via lake des Eudistes), Lloyd River (via le lake Manitou).
- Waterbodies: Eudist Lake, Lac du Canot, Lake Manitou
- Waterfalls: Chute à Wallace,
- Bridges: Route 138
- NRC Id: EHDEJ

The Manitou River (French: Rivière Manitou) is a river flowing in the unorganized territory of Lac-Jérôme and in the municipality of Rivière-au-Tonnerre, in the Minganie Regional County Municipality, in the Côte-Nord region in the province of Quebec, Canada.

It flows through largely unspoiled wilderness, and has spectacular falls nears its mouth.

Although there is hydroelectric potential, projects to develop the river in this way have met popular resistance, and instead it has been proposed to protect the river with a national part or indigenous reserve.

== Course ==
The Manitou River has its origin in Lac Caobus in the unorganized territory of Lac-Jérôme, Minganie Regional County Municipality, and lower down flows through the municipality of Rivière-au-Tonnerre, Minganie. The river flows south, widening in two places to form Lake Manitou and Eudist Lake. (Note: Lac des Eudistes is named after the Eudists, a religious community that settled on the north shore in 1903.) It reaches the Saint Lawrence in the Canton de Coopman, near the community of Manitou halfway between Sept-Îles and Havre-Saint-Pierre. The river basin lies between that of the Tortue River to the west and the Chaloupe River to the east.

The river is 148 kilometres (92 mi) long, with an average flow of 79 cubic metres per second (2,800 cu ft/s). It has a basin of 2,642 square kilometres (1,020 sq mi). Three falls with heights of 55 metres (180 ft), 20 metres (66 ft) and 40 metres (130 ft) have hydroelectric potential of 40, 30 and 20 megawatts respectively. There was a proposal in May 2001 to build 36 small (less than 50 MW) hydroelectric power stations on rivers throughout Quebec, including the Manitou. Due to popular pressure, most of the projects were abandoned. It has been proposed to instead make it a national park, or else a reserve, since the territory is claimed by the Innu.

== Name ==
The name is based on the belief among several indigenous people that the manitou represents the powers of life, and is the great spirit, and that the manitou is in the waterfall. The phrase Tché-Manitou means "good spirit" while Matchi-Manitou means "bad spirit" or "devil". Manitou is the French form of the word, while the English used the forms manitto, manetto or manitoa.

The name is common throughout Quebec except in the region south of the Saint Lawrence, and is even found in Inuit territories in the hybrid form Manitounuk.

The toponym "Manitou River" was formalized on December 5, 1968 at the Commission de toponymie du Québec.

== Chute Manitou ==
The coastal plain in this area is about 75 metres (246 ft) above sea level. Less than 1 kilometre (0.62 mi) from its mouth the river descends through falls 37 metres (121 ft) high. There is a tourist information center at the Chute Manitou, with a parking lot and picnic tables. At the fall the river is flanked on either side by trails through the boreal forest. The La Chute trail, which goes down to the bottom of the falls, has wooden stairs in places and landings giving views of the falls at different levels, including one with a height of almost 40 metres (130 ft). A small part of the trail passes over a red granite beach. The trails to the falls were closed in June 2017 for safety-related improvements.

== River basin ==
The Manitou River basin is elongated from north to south, with a length of about 120 kilometres (75 mi) and average width upstream of 30 kilometres (19 mi). Lower down the basin is narrower. The basin is divided between the unorganized territory of Rivière-Nipissis in the Sept-Rivières RCM (9.4%), and the unorganized territory of Lac-Jérôme (88.7%) and the municipality of Rivière-au-Tonnerre (1.9%) in the Miganie RCM.

The coastal plain is about 4 kilometres (2.5 mi) wide. Along the southern shore there is a steep escarpment. North of that the plain is fairly flat, with altitudes between 75 and 135 metres (246 and 443 ft). Above this there is a piedmont area that extends for 25 kilometres (16 mi) upstream, with average altitude rising from 150 metres (490 ft) in the south to 300 metres (980 ft) in the north. The piedmont has steep rounded hills up to 450 metres (1,480 ft) above sea level, rising 200–250 metres (660–820 ft) above water levels. North of the piedmont the Laurentian plateau region covers more than half the watershed. It contains massifs with undulating reliefs and altitudes of 600–700 metres (2,000–2,300 ft). Mount Manitou, which also contains part of the Tortue River watershed, has an elevation of 1,036 metres (3,399 ft).

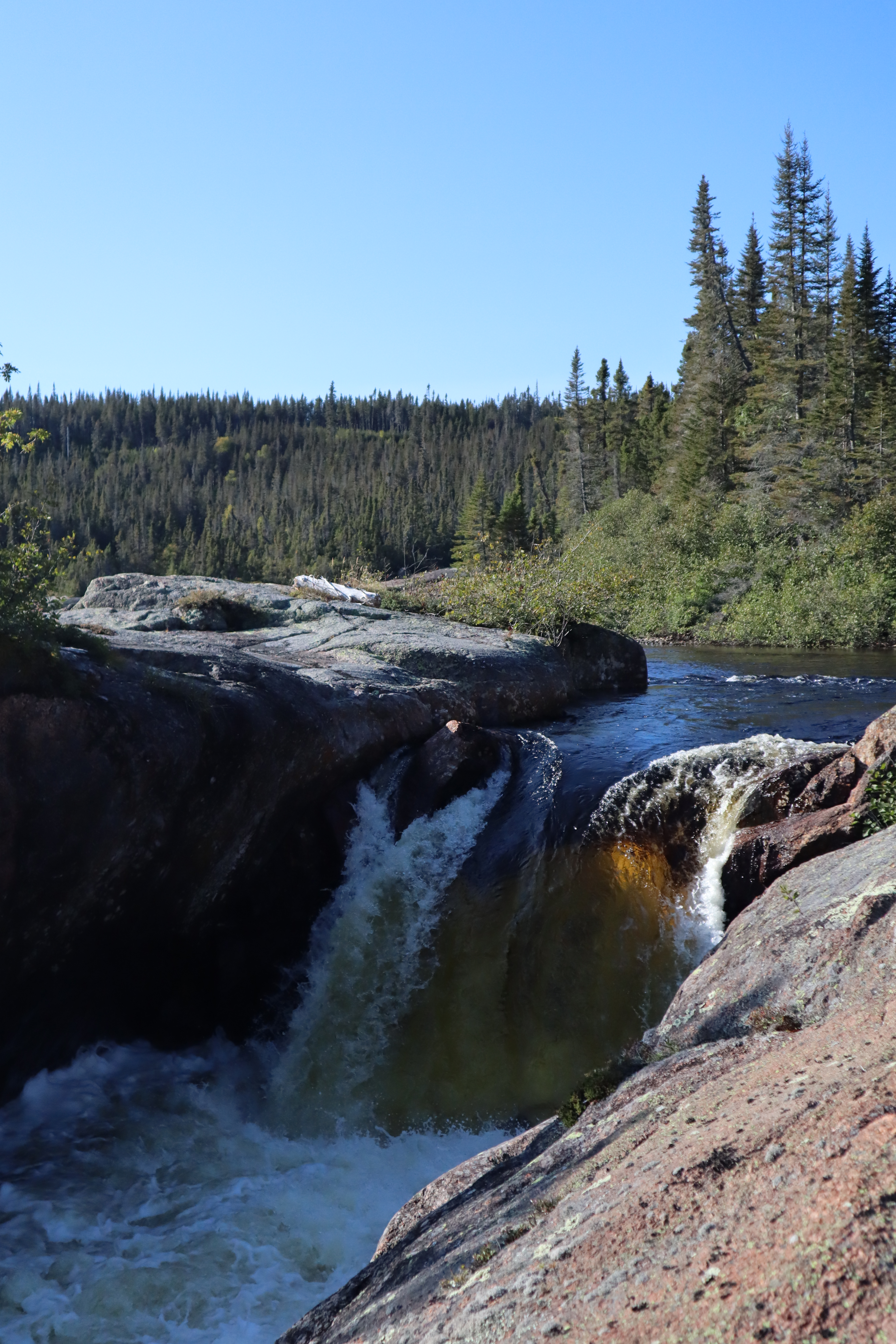
Waterfall on the river

The bedrock includes eight types of magmatic or metamorphosed rock complexes: mixed paragneiss, granite and pegmatite, anorthosite, granitoid rocks, granodiorite and charnockite gneisses, gabbro and migmatite. The bedrock on the plateau and piedmont is covered only by a thin and discontinuous layer of undifferentiated deposits that rarely is more than 1 metre (3 ft 3 in) thick. However, there are significant layers of glacial tills and glaciofluvial sediments in the alluvial valleys. In the coastal plain the Goldthwait Sea, which advanced after the last ice age and then retreated when the land rebounded from the weight of the ice, left large quantities of clay and silt sediments. These were later covered by deltaic sandy sediments.

== Hydrology ==
The streams and rivers in the north follow angular courses dictated by fractures in the hard bedrock, with straight line segments meeting at right angles. Valleys are typically V-shaped, rising up to 300 metres (980 ft) from water level. In the center the courses become more winding, and sometimes meander, as they flow through old U-shaped glacial valleys.

In the coastal plain the Manitou River has cut a straight valley through the soft sediments. The estuary is a bay 1.1 kilometres (0.68 mi) long and 800 metres (2,600 ft) wide, closed at the mouth by a long sandy spit with a small 150 metres (490 ft) opening into the Gulf. The river runs for 150 kilometres (93 mi) from north to south, with a vertical fall of 640 metres (2,100 ft). The average annual flow at its mouth is estimated at 75 cubic metres per second (2,600 cu ft/s), ranging from 18 to 168 cubic metres per second (640 to 5,930 cu ft/s) during the year. There are three large falls in the lower section of the river: the 35 metres (115 ft) high Grosse Chute, 0.8 kilometres (0.50 mi) from the river mouth, and the Aubin and Wallace falls respectively 2.4 kilometres (1.5 mi) and 3.3 kilometres (2.1 mi) from the river mouth. Tributaries include the Lavaivre River, which drains the northwest of the watershed, the Lloyd and Trout rivers, which drain the west-central portion and the Little Manitou River, which drains the east-central portion.

Waterbodies cover 9.99% of the basin. There are three large lakes. Aigle Lake in the north covers 23.6 square kilometres (9.1 sq mi), with an irregular shape. The 41.7 square kilometres (16.1 sq mi) Lake Manitou in the center-south of the basin is almost 25 kilometres (16 mi) long but only 1–2 kilometres (0.62–1.24 mi) wide, formed by flooding an old glacial valley with steep sides that rise to over 500 metres (1,600 ft) in places. Eudist Lake in the south covers 30.2 square kilometres (11.7 sq mi).

== Environment ==
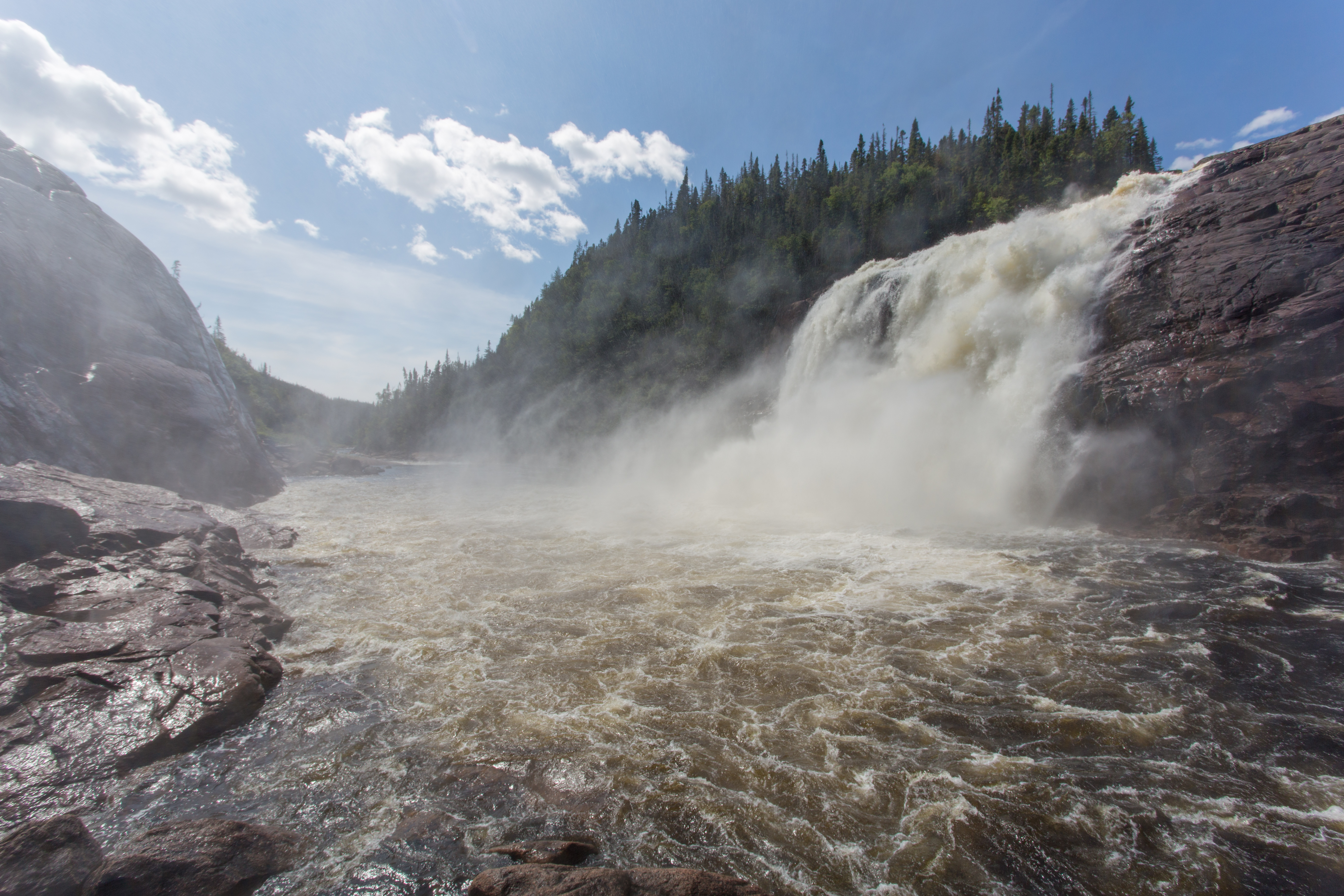
Another of the waterfalls

The coastal plain extends up to 6 kilometres (3.7 mi) from the river mouth and contains a large number of peat bogs, although only three are more than 500 hectares (1,200 acres). Further north, peat bogs are found only in the foot of valleys, and are mostly uniform and covered by shrubs. In the north, the section on the Canadian Shield is partly covered by fens. The forest has never been exploited except in a small area in 1910–1920, which is now colonized with hardwood. Otherwise the vegetation is typical of the region. There was a large fire to the east of Lake Aigle, date unknown, that burned more than 9,000 hectares (22,000 acres). There was another large fire along the railway in 1961–1970.

The number of fish species is estimated at 27. The river does not have the status of a salmon river, although the fish may enter the river estuary below the falls. It is estimated that up to 139 species of birds may nest in the watershed, taking advantage of the vast peat bogs of the coastal plain and the stretches of still water. Cliffs near the Eudistes, Canot and Manitou lakes also provide potential habitat for birds of prey.

A 2008 study identified potential for canoeing or kayaking down the river from upstream of Lake Manitou, 75 kilometres (47 mi) upstream, to Eudistes Lake, 20 kilometres (12 mi) upstream. Access would be by float plane, and camping sites would have to be prepared.

== Sources ==
- "Chute Manitou", québec original, Gouvernement du Québec
- Chutes Manitou (in French), Rando Québec
- Fermeture des sentiers des chutes Manitou (in French), Radio Canada, 30 June 2017
- "La rivière Manitou", PVP interactif (in French), Les Productions Vic Pelletier
- Portrait du bassin versant Manitou (in French), OBV Duplessis
- Portrait préliminaire de la zone de gestion intégrée de l'eau par bassin versant Duplessis (PDF) (in French), OBV Duplessis, April 2015, archived from the original (PDF) on 2019-09-02
- Rivière Manitou, Commission de toponymie du Québec
- Rivière Manitou, Natural Resources Canada
- Théberge, Claude; Massuard, Marie (August 2008), Étude de mise en valeur des rivières – Phase 1 MRC de la Minganie (PDF) (in French), Genivar S.E.C
