= Eudist Lake =

Lake in Quebec, Canada

- Lac des Eudistes, Lac à Sec
- Mantu Nipi (Innu)
- Location within Quebec
- Location: Lac-Jérôme, Minganie RCM, Quebec
- Coordinates: 50.5027778°N 65.2472222°W
- Primary inflows: Manitou River
- Primary outflows: Manitou River
- Max. length: 10 kilometres (6.2 mi)
- Max. width: 4 kilometres (2.5 mi)
- Surface area: 30.2 square kilometres (11.7 sq mi)
- Surface elevation: 148 metres (486 ft)
- Islands: 7

Eudist Lake (French: Lac des Eudistes) is a lake in the Côte-Nord region of the province of Quebec, Canada. The Manitou River flows through the lake from north to south, and continues to the Gulf of Saint Lawrence.

The Manitou River crosses the lake from north to south and continues to Gulf of St. Lawrence.

== Location ==
Eudist Lake is in the unorganized territory of Lac-Jérôme in the Minganie Regional County Municipality of Quebec. It is 10 kilometres (6.2 mi) long and 4 kilometres (2.5 mi) wide, and is 20 kilometres (12 mi) upstream from the mouth of the Manitou River. The lake has an area of 30.2 square kilometres (11.7 sq mi).

This lake has the following bays (clockwise from the mouth): Eugène-Francis Cove, Johnny-Tremblay Bay, Imbeault Bay, Trois Soeurs Bay, baie du Lac in Nazaire, Gaudreau Cove, Pilot Bay, Baie des Tugs.

The course of the Manitou River crosses the Lac des Eudistes from north to south over 10.7 kilometres (6.6 mi). The mouth of the lake is located at the bottom of a triangular bay in the south-east.

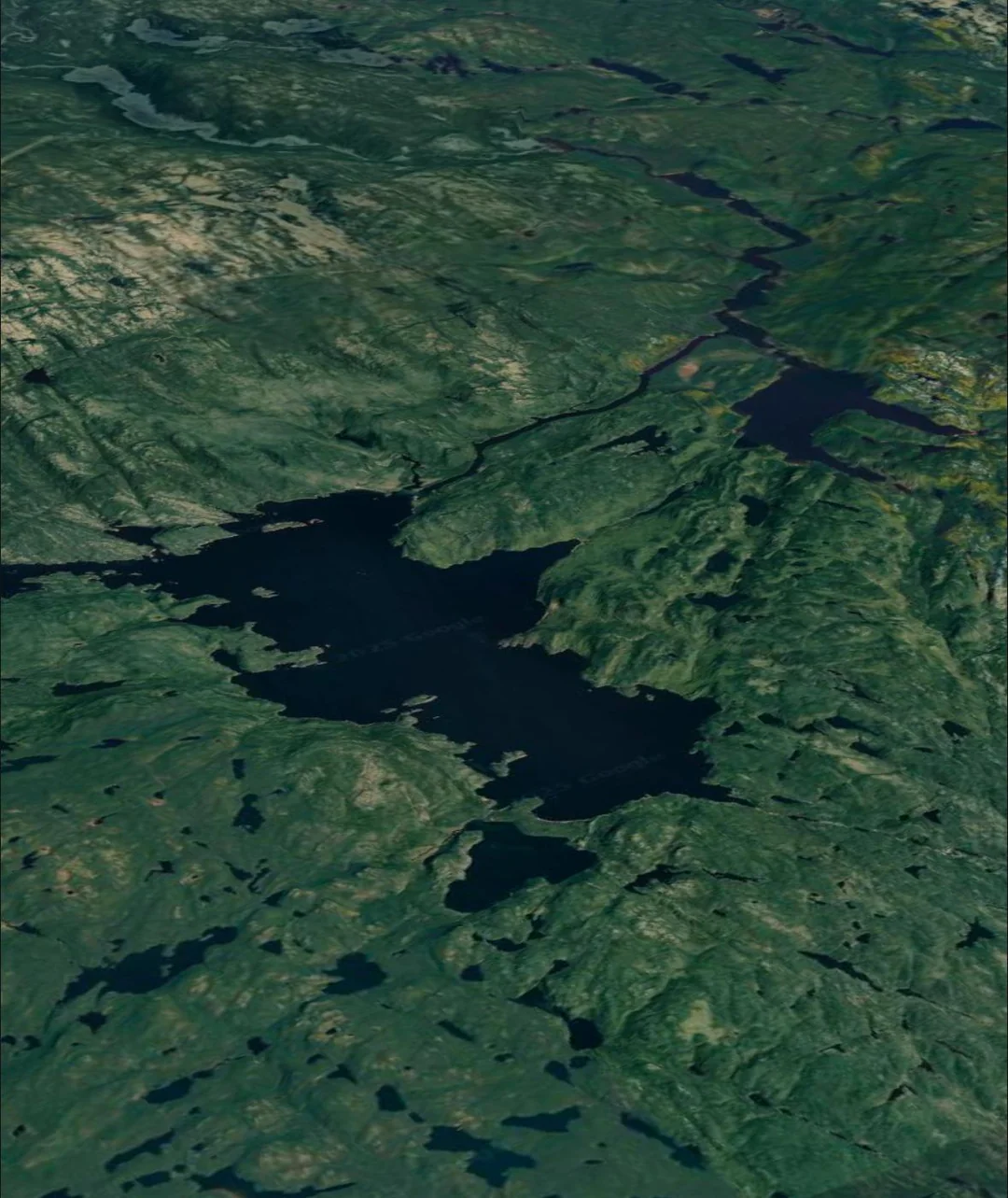

== Name ==
The Innu call the lake Mantu Nipi, meaning "lake of the great spirit", or Manitou. The French name is in honor of the Congregation of Jesus and Mary, or Eudists, an order that was founded in 1643 in Caen by Saint John Eudes (1601–1680). The order was broken up during the French Revolution, then reformed in 1826 with the mission of education and propagation of the Christian faith. The Eudists settled in the Maritimes in 1890, and in Quebec from 1903. They were given responsibility for the whole of the Côte-Nord, including Anticosti Island, and founded many parishes, missions and schools. The lake was first given this name in 1916 in the Nomenclature des noms géographiques de la province de Québec published by the Geography Commission. It was formerly called Lac à Sec (Dry Lake).

== Fishing ==
The Pourvoirie Mabec provides outfitter services in 105 square kilometres (41 sq mi) of water including the Eudist and Brézel lakes. The main fish species are Brook trout (Salvelinus fontinalis) and Arctic char (Salvelinus alpinus), with trout often weighing 3–5 pounds (1.4–2.3 kg). Fishing is allowed in June and August, but not in July. At the start of the season the fish are found in the main lakes, but by the end of summer they migrate to the Manitou River.

== Sources ==
- Cabana, Julien (8 January 2014), "Mabec, un rêve réalisable", Le Journal de Québec (in French)
- Cabana, Julien (26 August 2014b), "Mabec, un exemple de gestion à succès", Le Journal de Montréal (in French)
- Campeau, Patrick (28 January 2014), "Les ogresses de Mabec", Le Journal de Montréal (in French)
- Lac des Eudistes (in French), Commission de toponymie du Québec
- Lac des Eudistes, Natural Resources Canada
- Portrait du bassin versant Manitou (in French), OBV Duplessis
