= Minganie Regional County Municipality =

Minganie
- Regional county municipality
- Coordinates: 50°14′N 63°36′W
- Country: Canada
- Province: Quebec
- Region: Côte-Nord
- Effective: January 1, 1982
- County seat: Havre-Saint-Pierre

Government
  - Type: Prefecture
  - Prefect: Meggie Richard

Area
  - Total: 63,731.31 km^{2} (24,606.80 sq mi)
  - Land: 53,340.31 km^{2} (20,594.81 sq mi)
- Includes native reserves

Population (2021)
  - Total: 6,467
  - Density: 0.1/km^{2} (0.26/sq mi)
  - Pop (2016-21): ▼1.8%
  - Dwellings: 3,306
- Includes native reserves
- Time zone: UTC−5 (EST)
  - Summer (DST): UTC−4 (EDT)
- Area codes: 418 and 581
- Website: mrc.minganie.org

Minganie (French pronunciation: [mɛ̃ɡani]) is a regional county municipality on the north shore of the Gulf of St. Lawrence, in the Côte-Nord region of Quebec, Canada. Its territory includes Anticosti Island.

== Toponymy ==
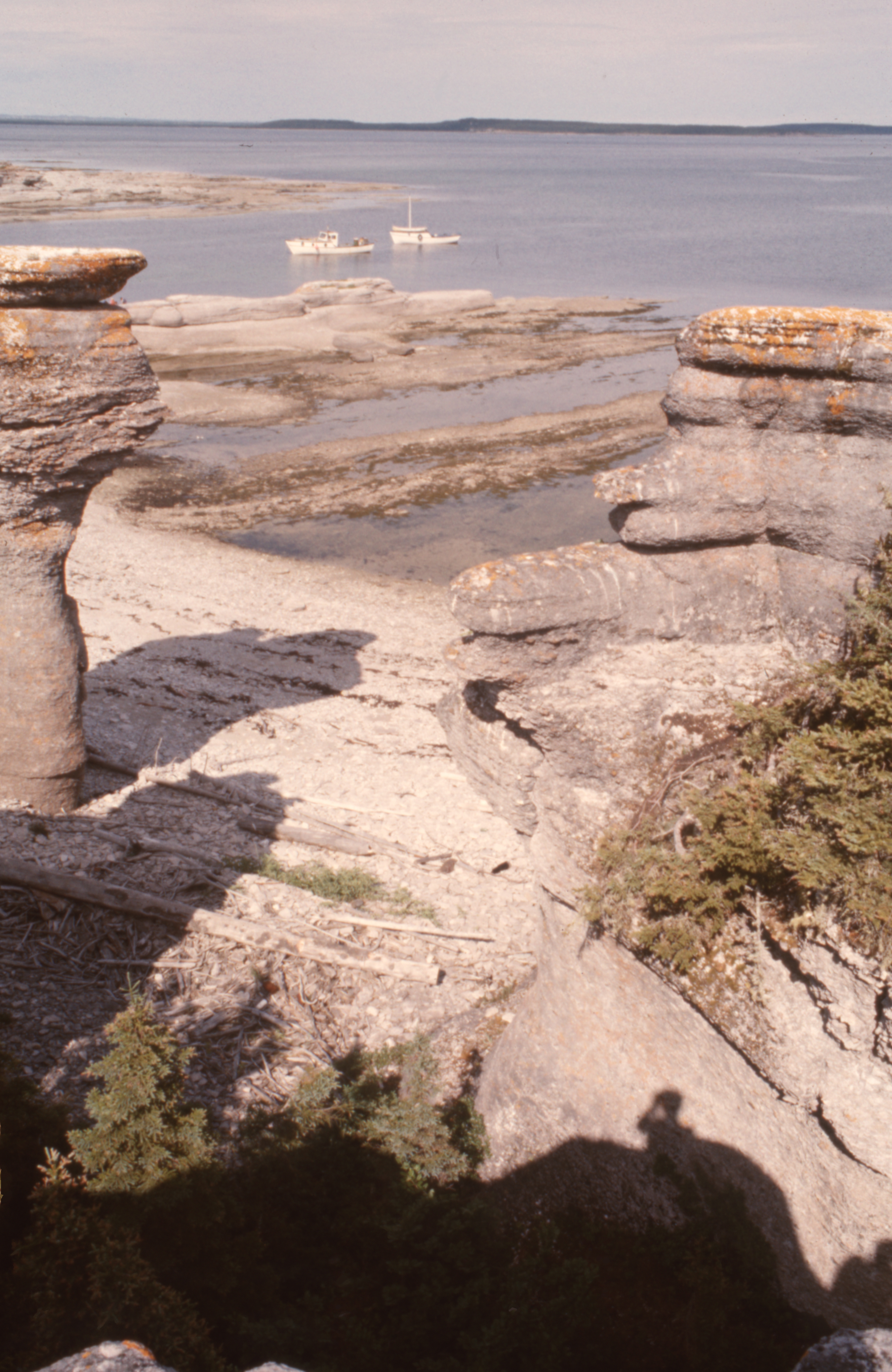
Gulf of St. Lawrence, Niapiskau island, Mingan Archipelago National Park Reserve

Both the largest (128,473 km²) and the second least populated, the regional county municipality of Minganie extends from Labrador to the middle of the Honguedo Strait in the St. Lawrence River and includes the hinterland of Le Golfe-du-Saint-Laurent RCM and Anticosti Island.

Construction workers, transport workers, miners, fishermen and trappers are also found there in larger proportions than in Quebec in general.

The origins of Minganie's population can be traced to Innu, Acadian and Gaspesians pioneers and its new residents who arrived via Route 138 (The Whale Route - Route Jacques-Cartier), opened in 1976.

== Administration ==
The RCM administration is seat is Havre-Saint-Pierre. It has an area of 63,731.31 square kilometres (24,606.80 sq mi) according to Quebec's Ministère des Affaires municipales, des Régions et de l'Occupation du territoire (which includes coastal, lake, and river water territory), or a land area of 53,340.31 square kilometres (20,594.81 sq mi) according to Statistics Canada. Its population in the 2021 Canadian census was 6,467. The majority live in Havre-Saint-Pierre.

Minganie and the neighbouring Le Golfe-du-Saint-Laurent Regional County Municipality are grouped into the single census division of Minganie—Le Golfe-du-Saint-Laurent (known as Minganie–Basse-Côte-Nord before 2010). The combined population at the 2021 Canadian census was 9,849.

Until 2002, Minganie RCM encompassed the entire lower north shore right up to Blanc-Sablon. In 2002, it lost all the coastal communities east of the Natashquan River when the Basse-Côte-Nord Territory was formed. In July 2010, the RCM lost another 44% of its territory when the (uninhabited) Petit-Mécatina unorganized territory was transferred to the newly created Le Golfe-du-Saint-Laurent Regional County Municipality, which superseded Basse-Côte-Nord.

== Overview of the region ==
Several portions of territory on the Minganie are dedicated specifically to the protection and maintenance of heritages.

Heritages sites in the region

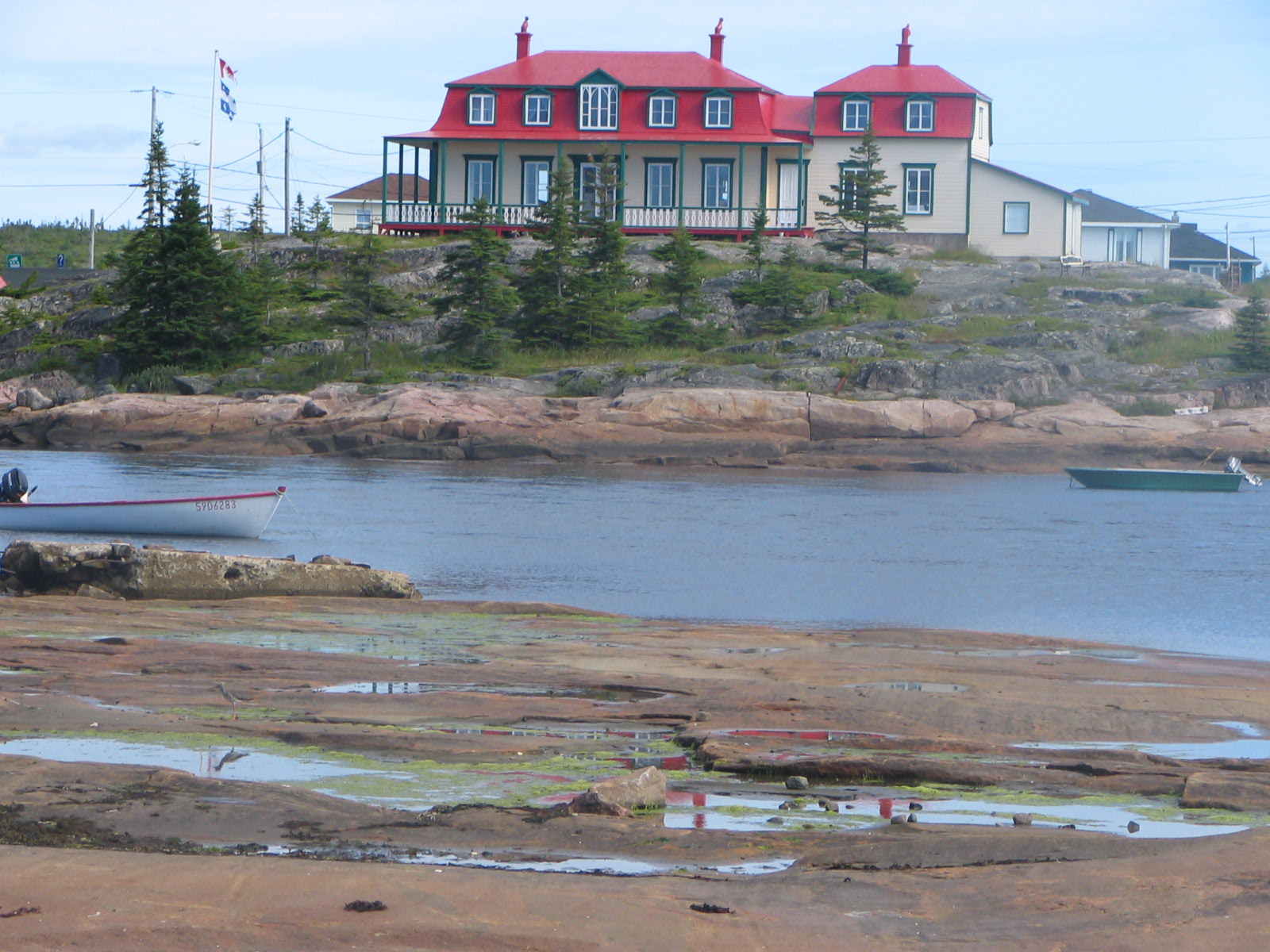
Johan Beetz House (Le Chateau)

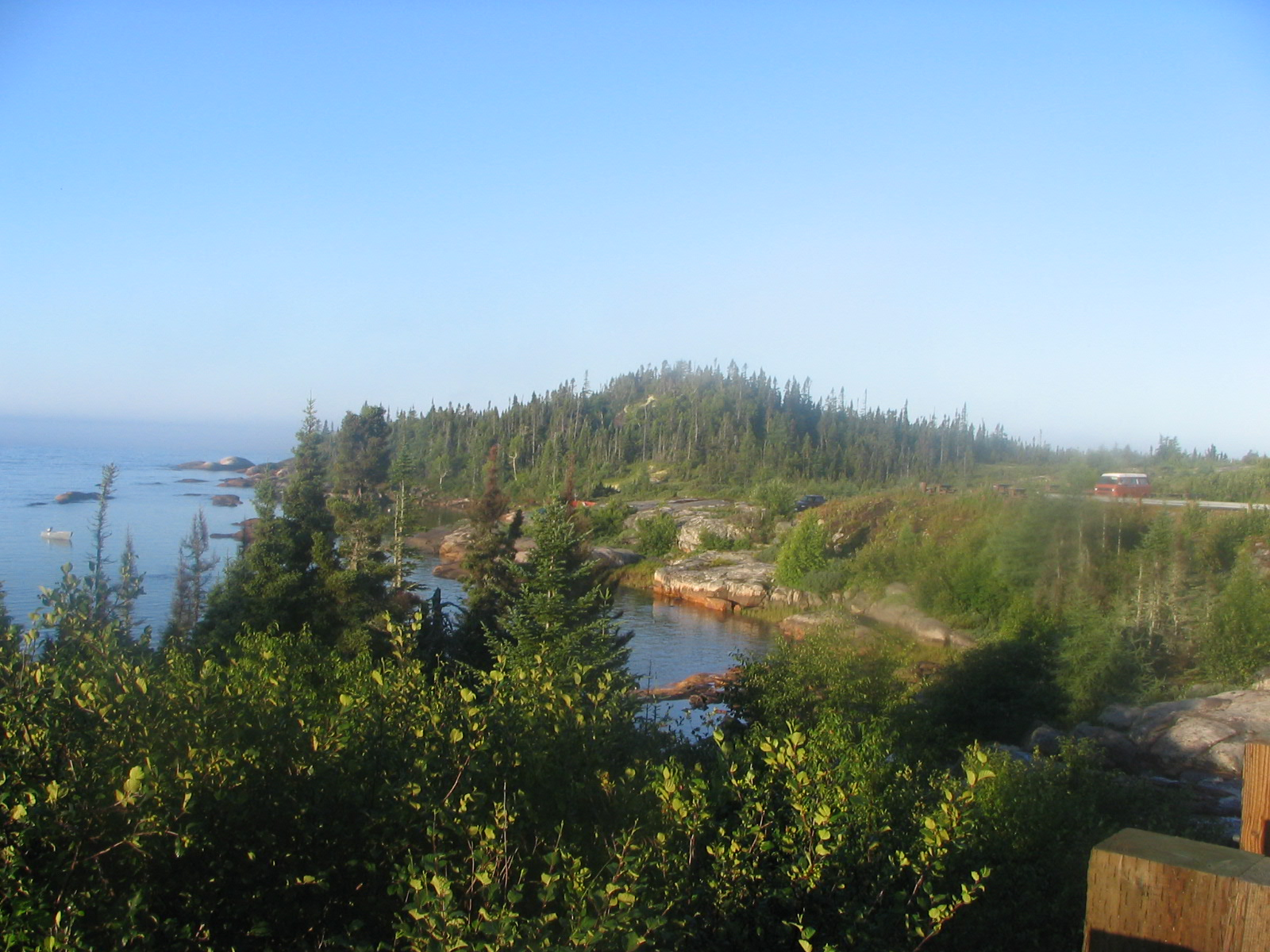
Wastishou Migratory Bird Sanctuary

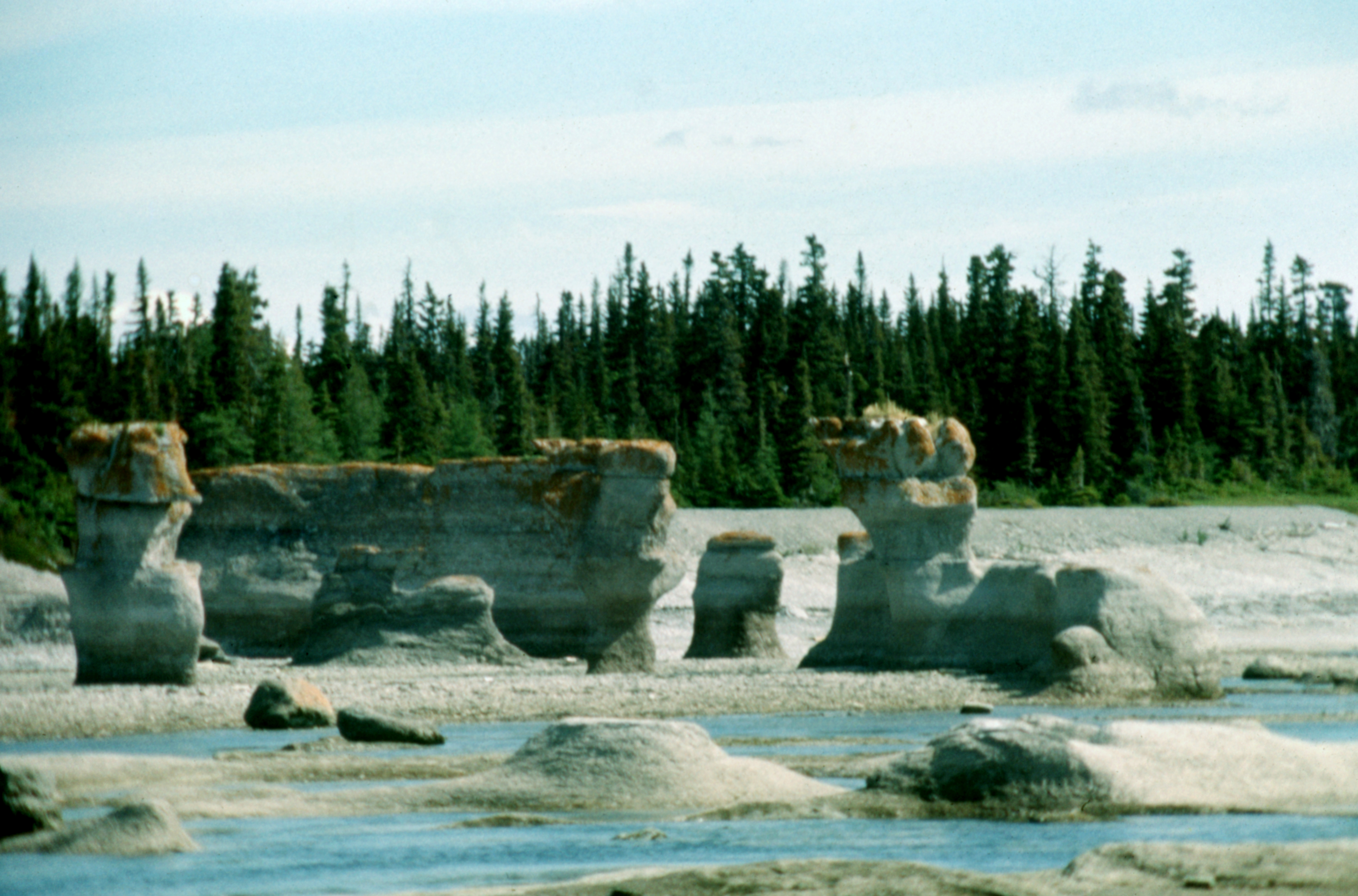
Mingan Archipelago National Park Reserve, geological site

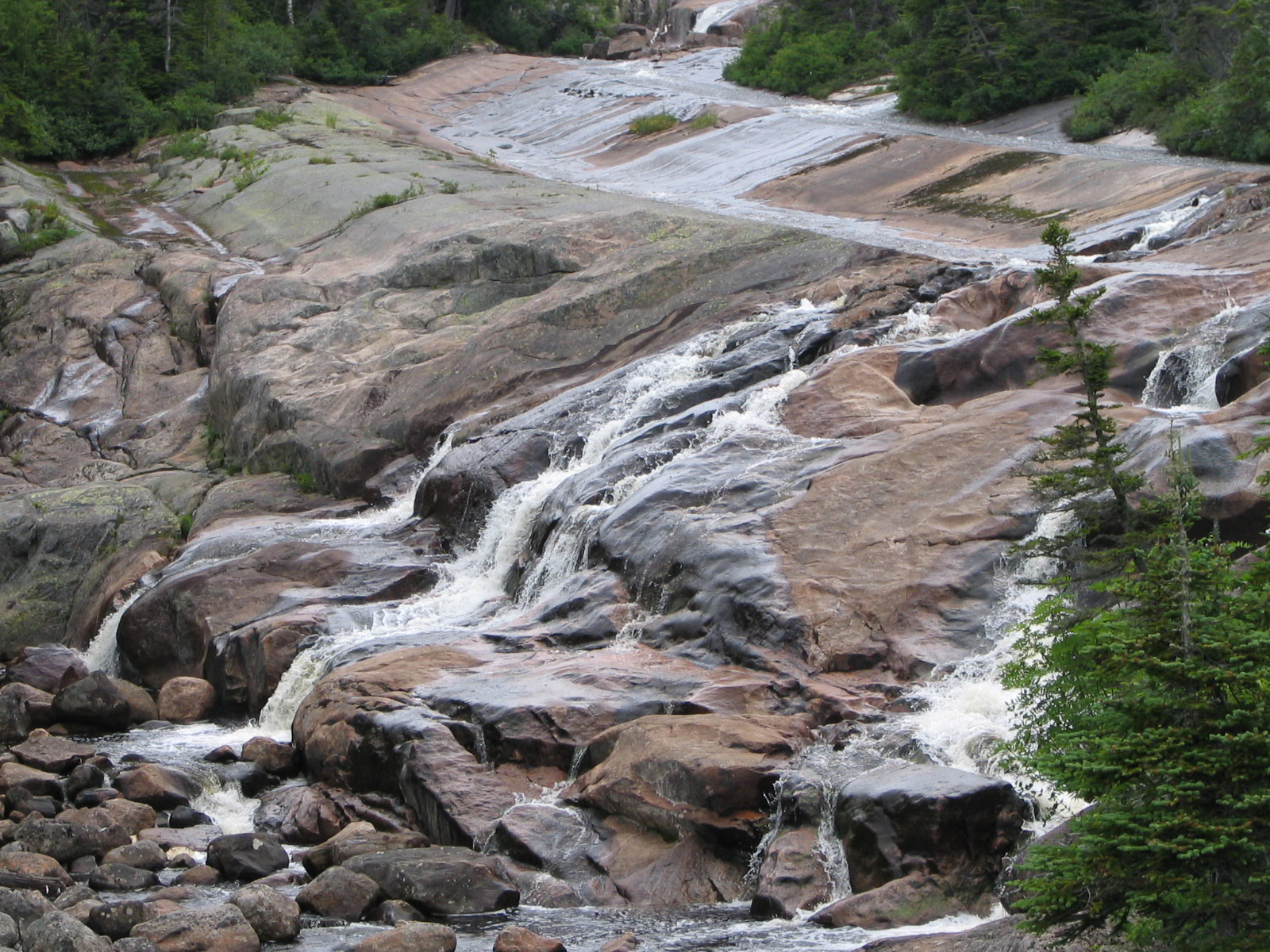
Sault Plat River, geological site

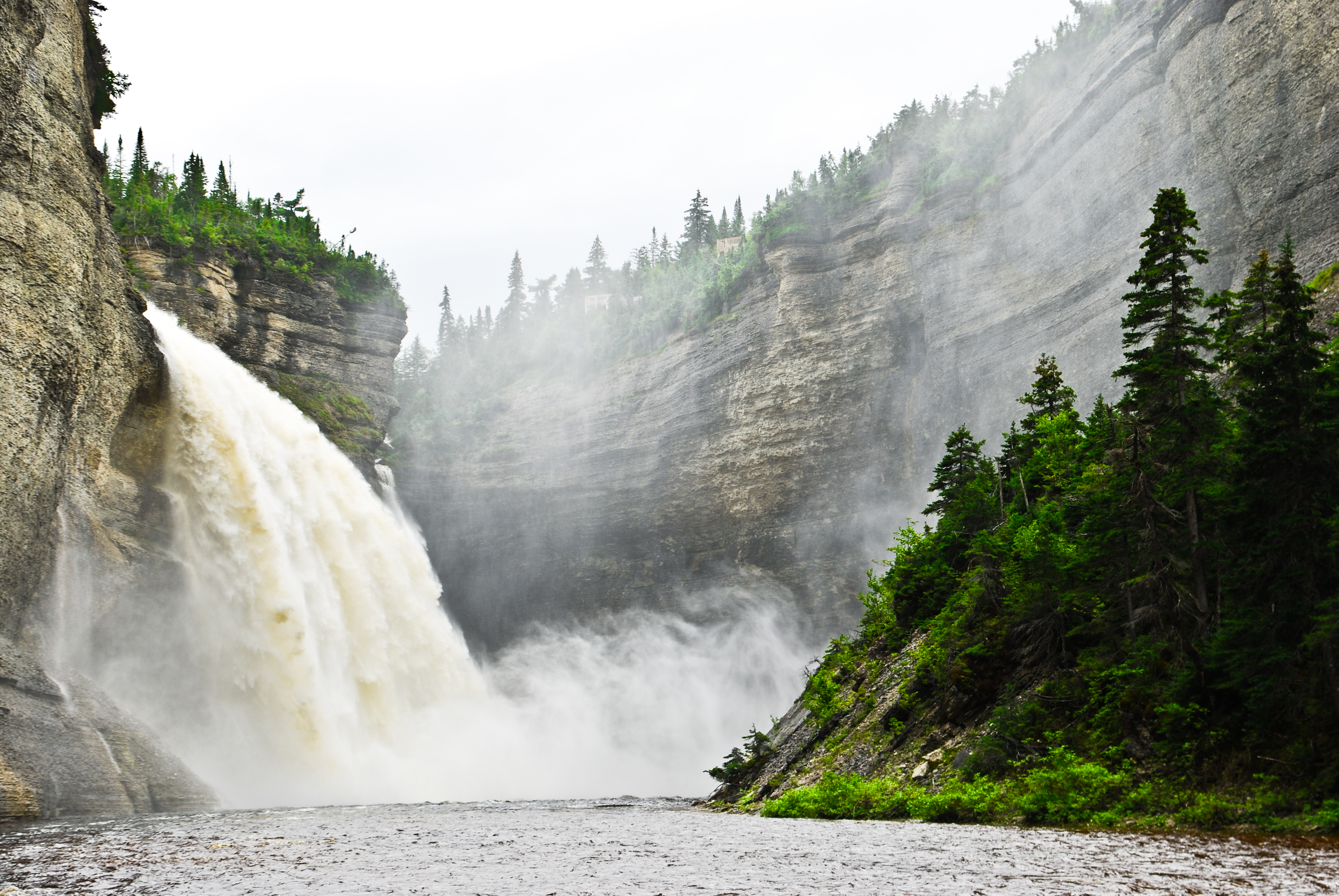
Anticosti Island UNESCO's World Heritage

== Subdivisions ==
There are 9 subdivisions and 2 native reserves within the RCM:

Municipalities (8)

- Aguanish
- Baie-Johan-Beetz
- Havre-Saint-Pierre
- L'Île-d'Anticosti
- Longue-Pointe-de-Mingan
- Natashquan
- Rivière-au-Tonnerre
- Rivière-Saint-Jean

Unorganized Territory (1)

- Lac-Jérôme

Native Reserves (2)
(not associated with RCM)

- Mingan
- Nutashkuan

== Demographics ==
Historical census populations – Minganie Regional County Municipality
Year	Pop.	±%
2011	6,613	—
2016	6,587	−0.4%
2021	6,467	−1.8%
Population amounts include native reserves. Source: Statistics Canada

== Transportation ==
=== Sea - Air - Ground ===
Until the arrival of The Whale Route (Route 138) in 1976 and 1996, the only regular means of access to the area was the boat service maintained during the navigation season by Clarke Steamship Company, Ltd. The regularity of the service becomes more and more uncertain from the month of September, depending on the date of the arrival of winter with its snow, ice, storms and fog. However, it is possible to reach the area by chartering seaplanes that can easily land under favourable atmospheric conditions in many deep bays and on windward waters sheltered by islands.

=== Route & trails ===
Highways and numbered routes that run through the RCM, including external routes that start or finish on its borders.

- Autoroutes
  - None
- Principal Highways
  - R-138 - The Whale Route
- Secondary Highways
  - None
- External Routes
  - None

In 2024, the Côte-Nord region is part of the network of the 33 000 km of trails of The Federation of Snowmobile Clubs of Quebec and La Minganie Snowmobile Club, based in Les Escoumins, offer detailed interactive maps on the different circuits and their points of services.

== River basins ==
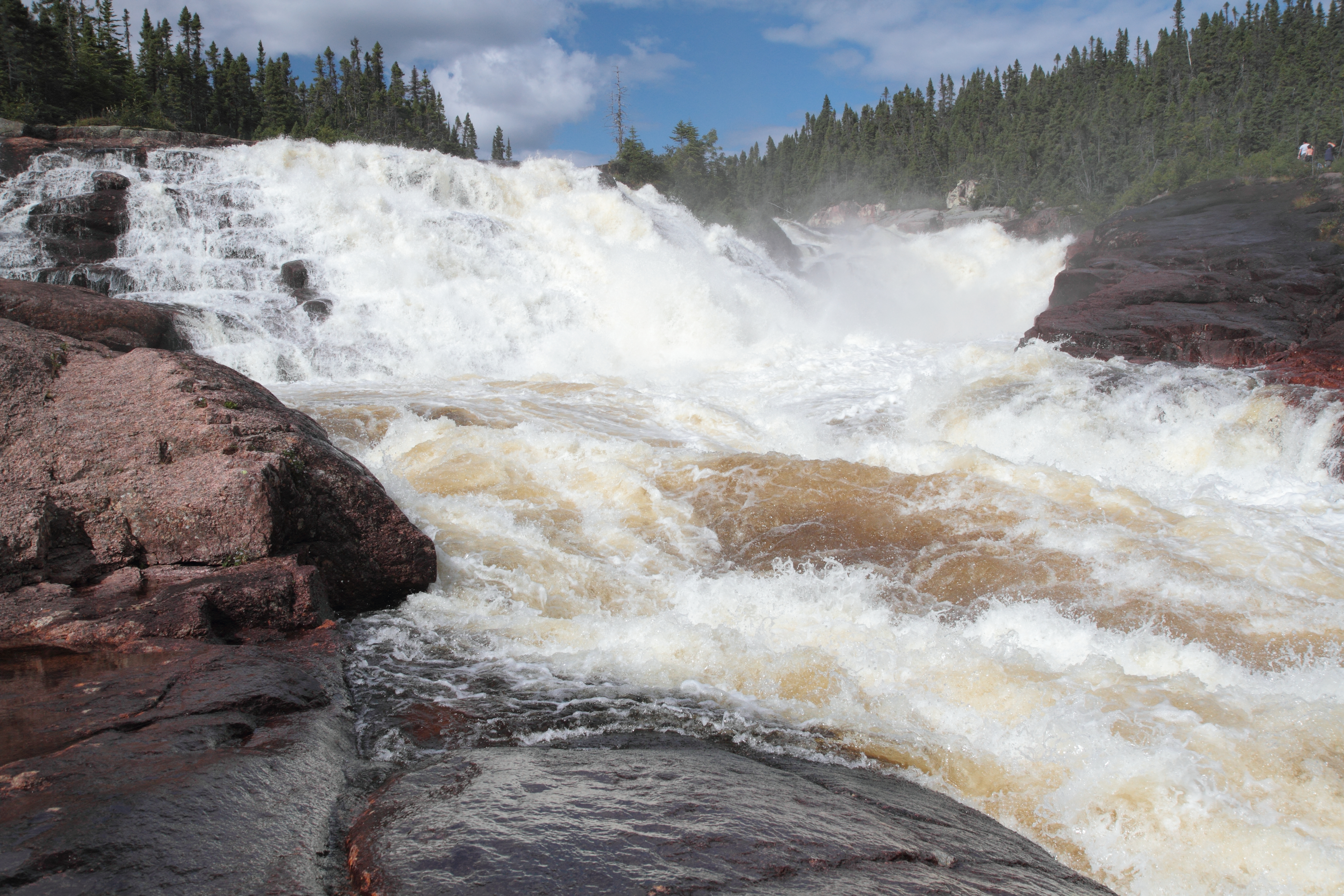
Falls on the Manitou River

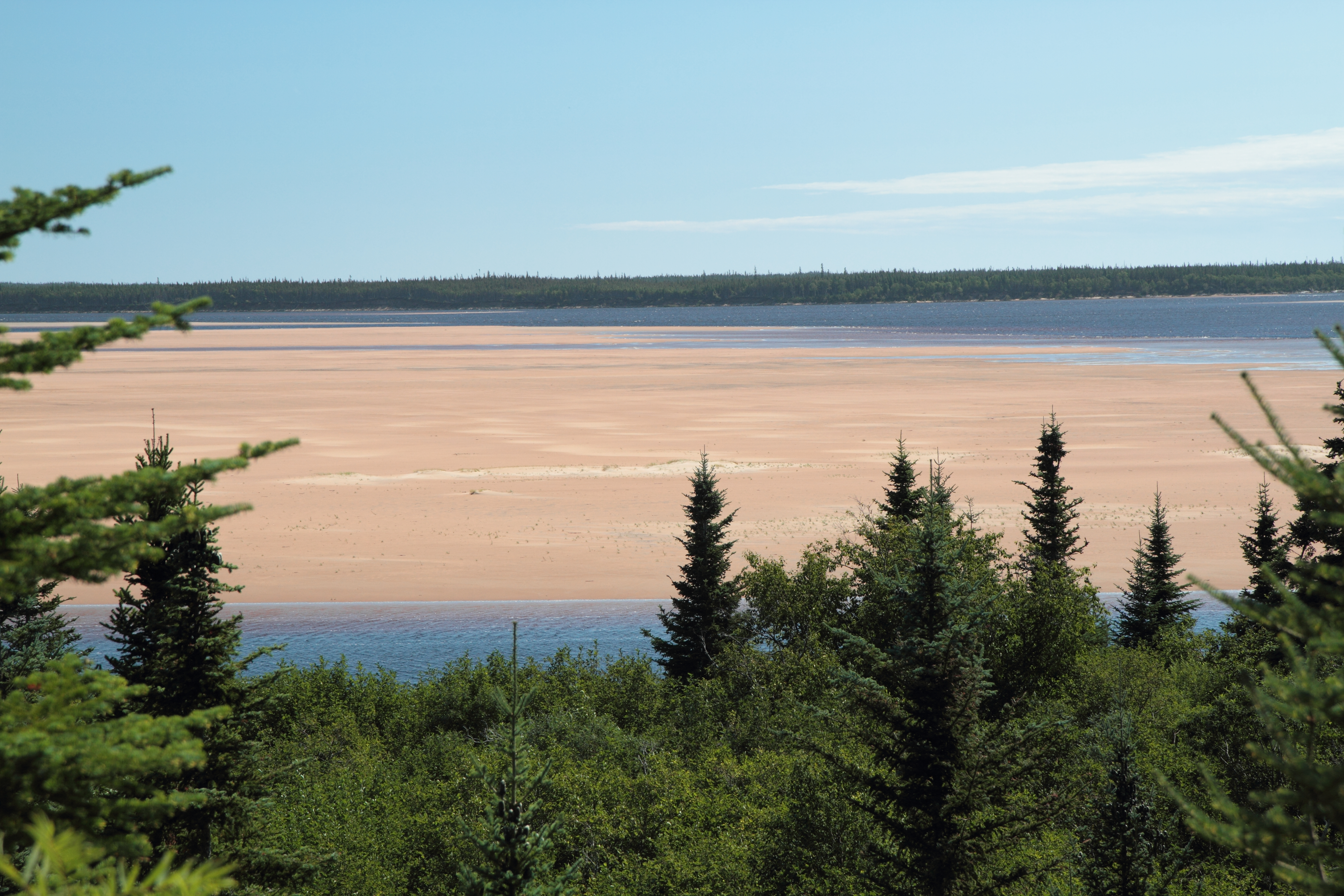
Natashquan River near its mouth

There are a number of large rivers that flow in a generally north–south direction through Minganie to enter the Gulf. Near the coast the river basins tend to narrow in towards the river mouth, and between their mouths are areas that drain into the Gulf through smaller streams. From west to east, the larger river basins, which may cover parts of Labrador, Sept-Rivières or Le Golfe-du-Saint-Laurent, are:

River	Basin size		Mouth coordinates	Map link
River	km^{2}	sq. mile	Mouth coordinates	Map link
Bouleau	684	264	50.281944°N 65.514722°W	EFPVK
Sault Plat	87.7	33.9	50.292778°N 65.443056°W	EIBXJ
Tortue	793	306	50.300833°N 65.374167°W	EIHTJ
Manitou	2,653	1,024	50.297778°N 65.241389°W	EHDEJ
Chaloupe	202	78	50.293056°N 65.121944°W	EFVQV
Sheldrake	1,183	457	50.271667°N 64.929167°W	EIDHB
Tonnerre	692	267	50.273611°N 64.779444°W	EIHQL
Jupitagon	223	86	50.287222°N 64.584444°W	EGURN
Magpie	7,646	2,952	50.319722°N 64.458889°W	EHCNP
Saint-Jean	5,599	2,162	50.283333°N 64.334444°W	EIACM
Mingan	2,321	896	50.295833°N 63.989444°W	EHGSU
Romaine	14,510	5,600	50.302222°N 63.803333°W	EHXDD
Ours	260	100	50.298333°N 63.058056°W	EHMZM
Corneille	563	217	50.2844444°N 62.8980556°W	EFZNQ
Piashti	386	149	50.2863889°N 62.8052778°W	EHQDT
Quetachou	1,017	393	50.3102778°N 62.7238889°W	EHTZO
Véronique	111	43	50.3108333°N 62.7033333°W	EIKWH
Watshishou	1,044	403	50.2694444°N 62.6925°W	EIMMB
Little Watshishou	413	159	50.2719444°N 62.6316667°W	EIMMC
Pashashibou	154	59	50.2775°N 62.3486111°W	EHOAQ
Nabisipi	2,086	805	50.2330556°N 62.2205556°W	EHJDV
Aguanish	5,777	2,231	50.2180556°N 62.0861111°W	EKVRE
Natashquan	16,005	6,180	50.1186111°N 61.8072222°W	EHJNH

== Flora ==
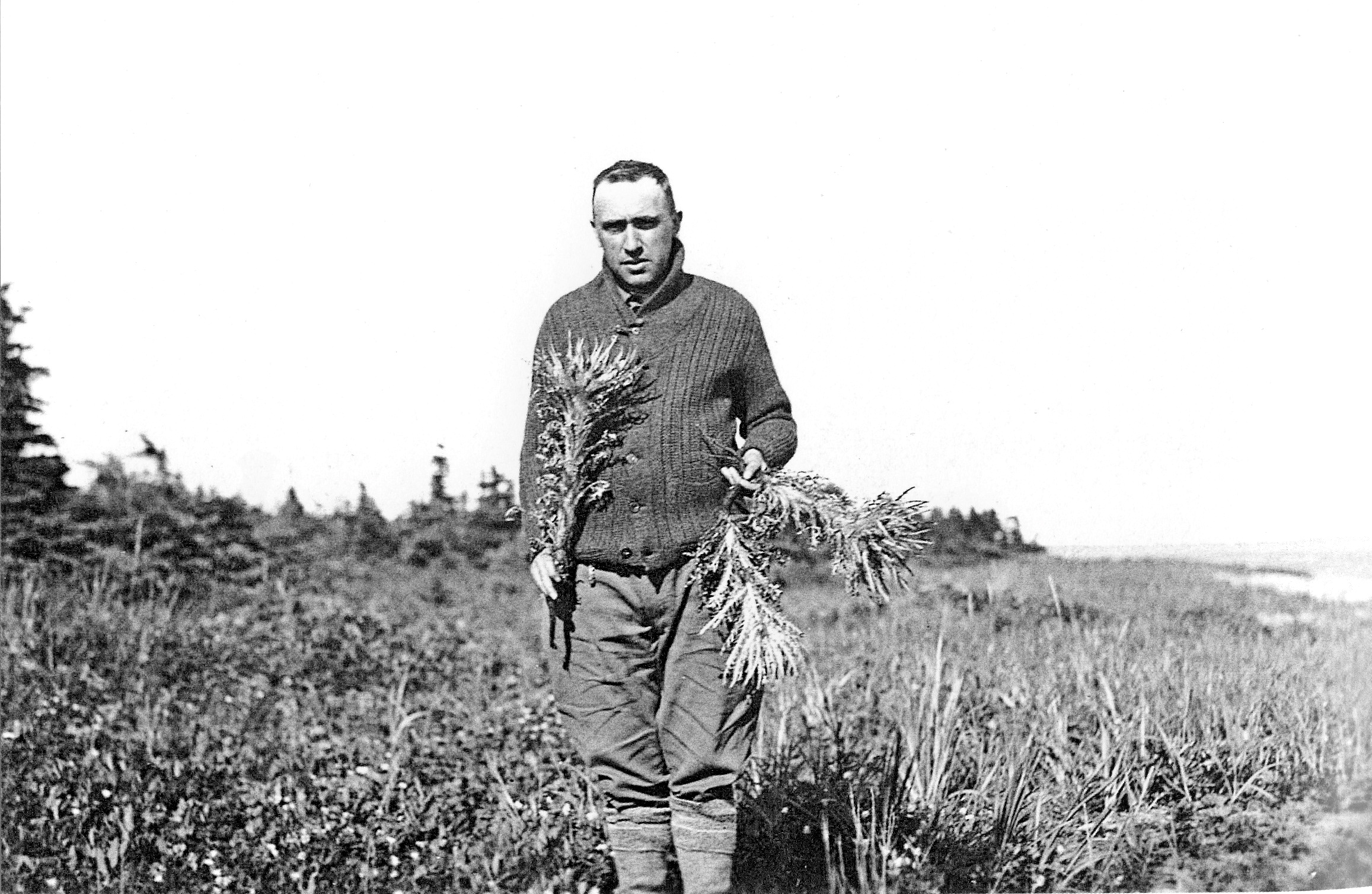
Frère Marie-Victorin (1885–1944), Mingan archipelago 1928, in hand, the C. minganense (large pale plant, with flower heads gathered in a mass surpassed by the leaves

With the exception of a few enclaves, the ecological region of Minganie is mainly covered by large Spruce forests and a few laricinin fields (Larix laricina (Du Roi) K. Koch). There are also White spruce (Picea glauca (Moench) Voss.), Dwarf birch (Betula glandulosa Minchx), Rough alder (Alnus rugosa (DuRoi Spreng.) and Trembling aspen (Populus tremuloides Michaux).

Brothers Marie-Victorin and Rolland Germain F.E.C. explored the region from 1924 to 1928. Their work has raised awareness in the scientific community of the enormous value of the Mingan Archipelago. Since then, other scientists have added to the ecology and phytogeography knowledge of this sector.

The vegetation of the Mingan Islands belongs to the Chibougamau-Natashquan boreal forest region, which is dominated by Black spruce. The high latitude and low altitude, combined with the proximity of the cold currents of Labrador, explain the subarctic vegetation specific to the Minganie.

The entirely calcareous nature of the horizontal stratified rocks, which make up the Anticosti - Minganie, exerts a profound influence on the structure of the flora and on the choice of species.

Remarkable for its richness, the flora includes 350 vascular plants including the presence of two rare taxa: Cirsium foliosum var. Minganense and Cypripedium passerinum var. Minganense. Sixty species are new to the list of Minganie harvests compiled by Marie-Victorin and Rolland-Germain (1969). There were also 150 bryophytes and 152 lichens, 29 of which were additions to the Nouveau Catalogue des lichens, published by Lepage (1972).

Overwiew of the diversity

Vegetation of Quebec's Cold Sea Shores

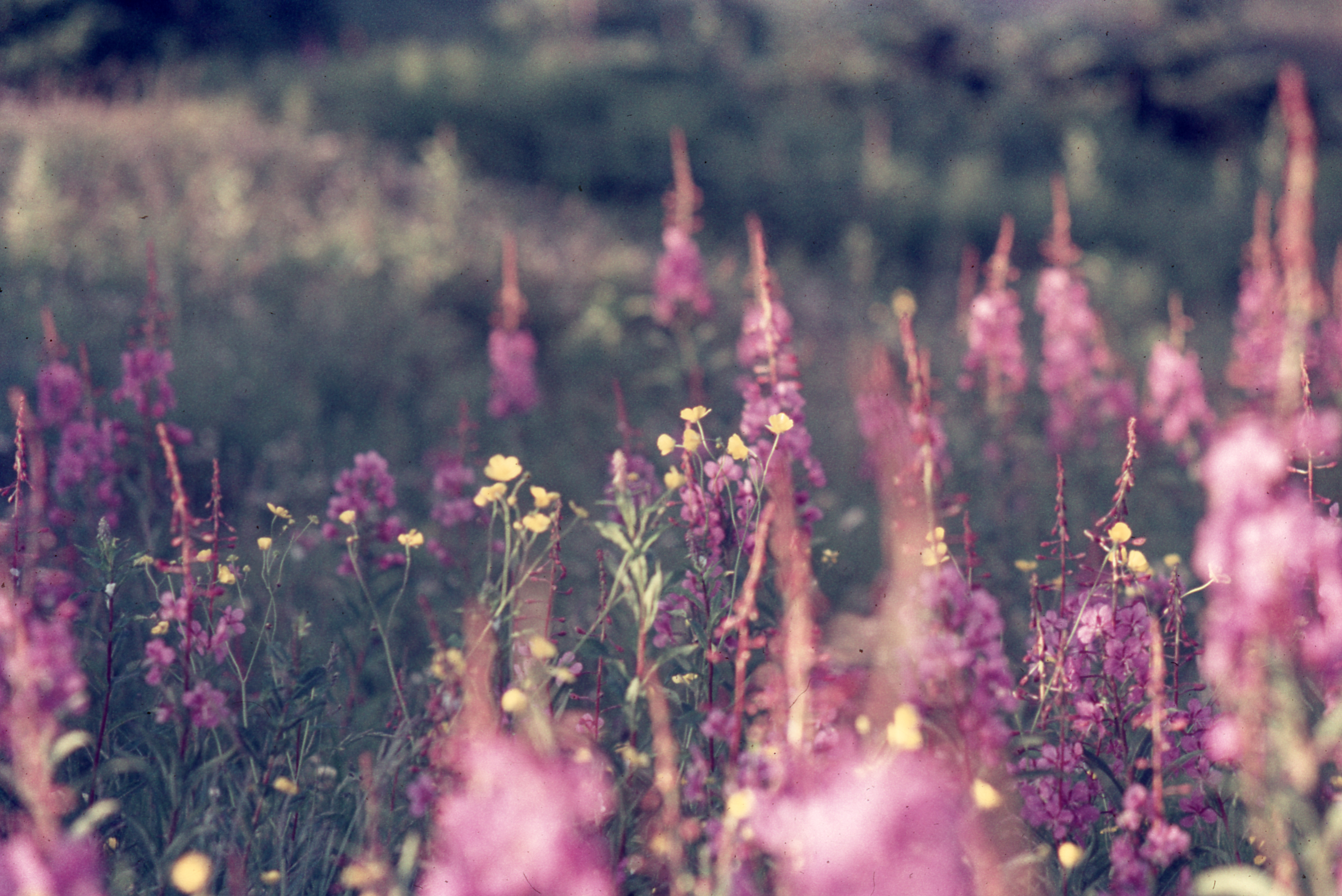
Epilobium angustifolium Linné. — Épilobe à feuilles étroites. — Bouquets rouges. — (Fireweed).

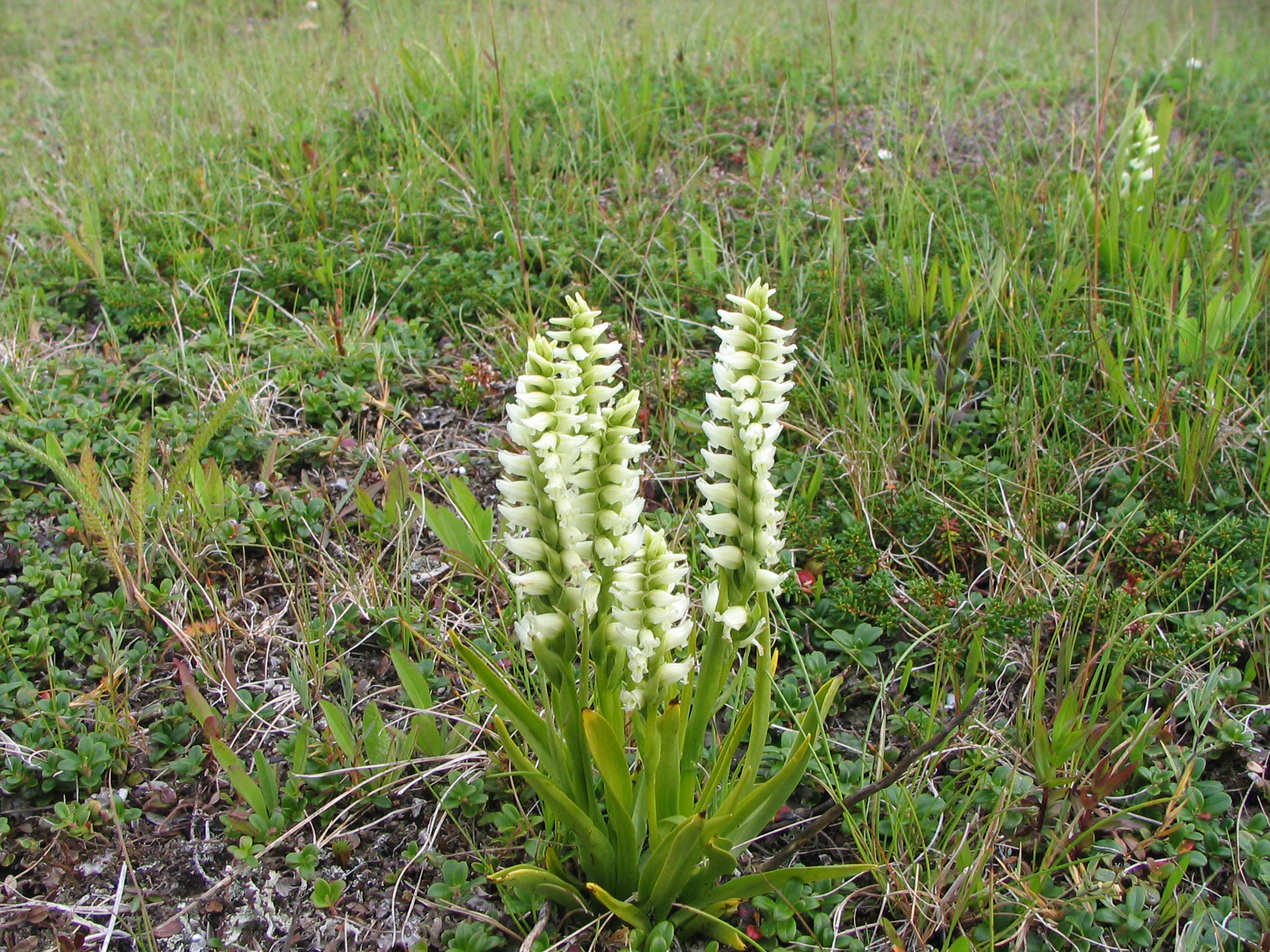
Spiranthes romanzoffiana Chamisso. – Spiranthe de Romanzoff. – (Romanzoff's ladies'-tresses).

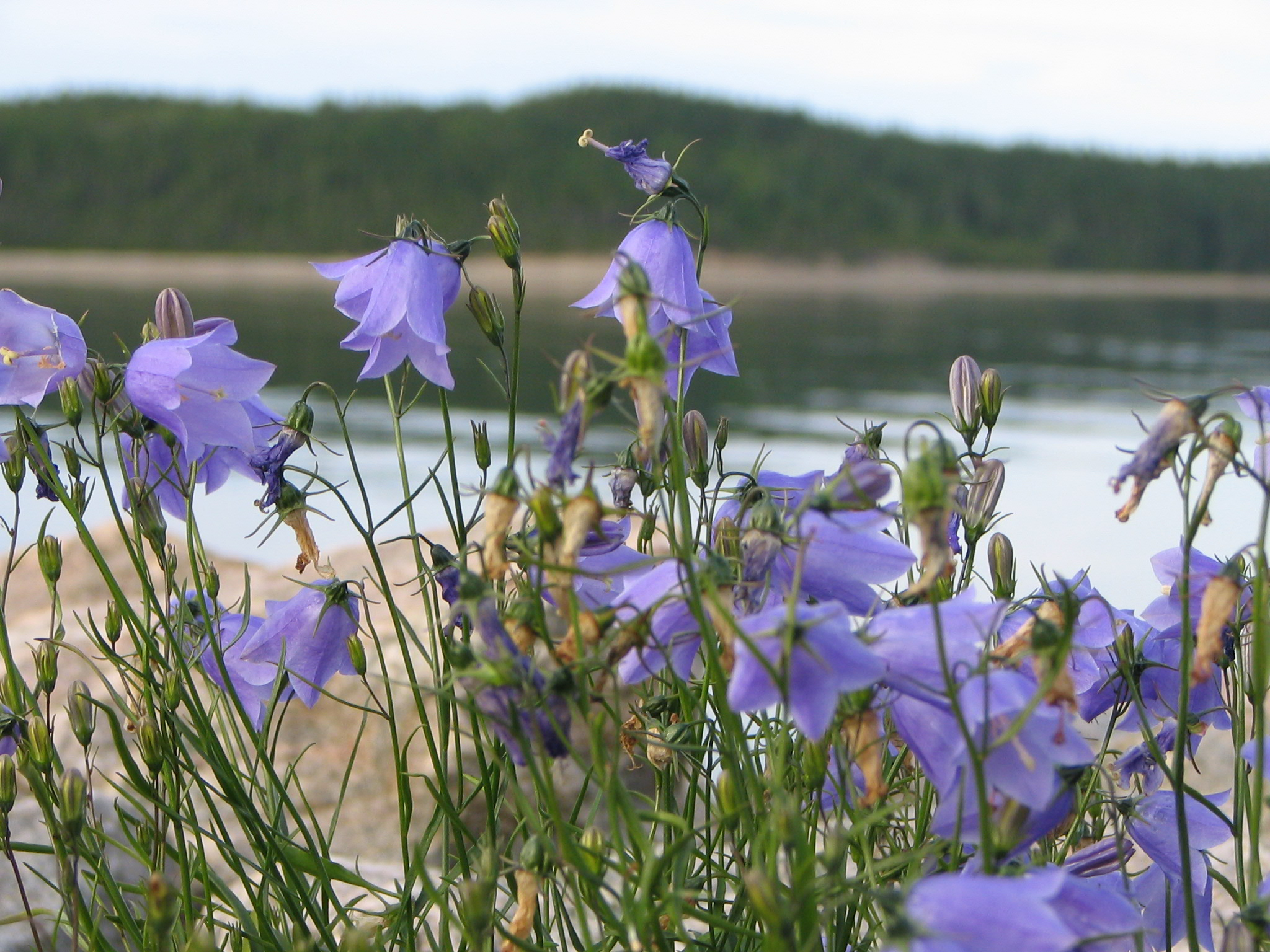
Campanula rotundifolia Linné. – Campanule à feuilles rondes. – (Bluebell).

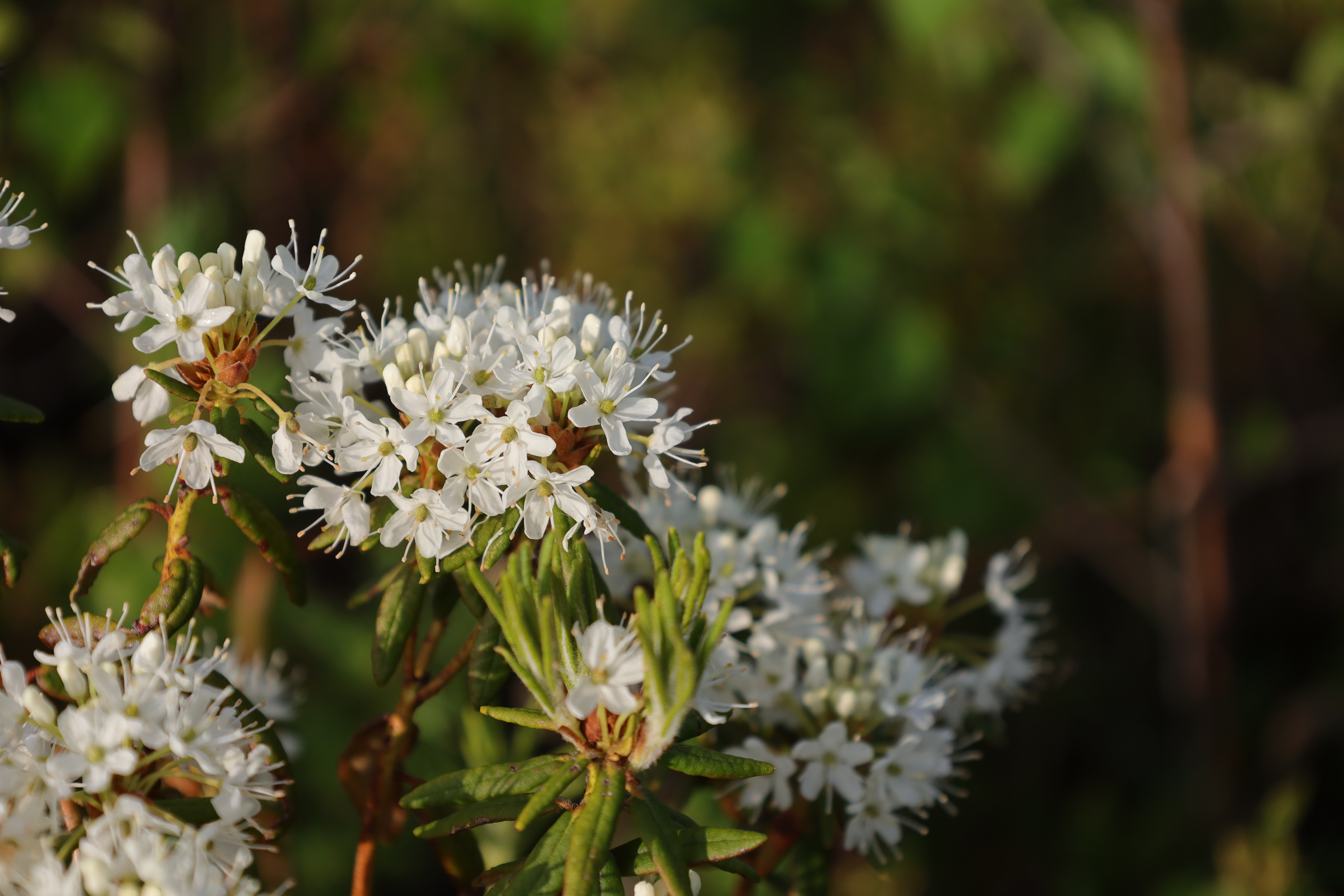
Ledum groenlandicum. — Lédon du Groenland. — Thé du Labrador, Thé velouté. — (Labrador Tea).

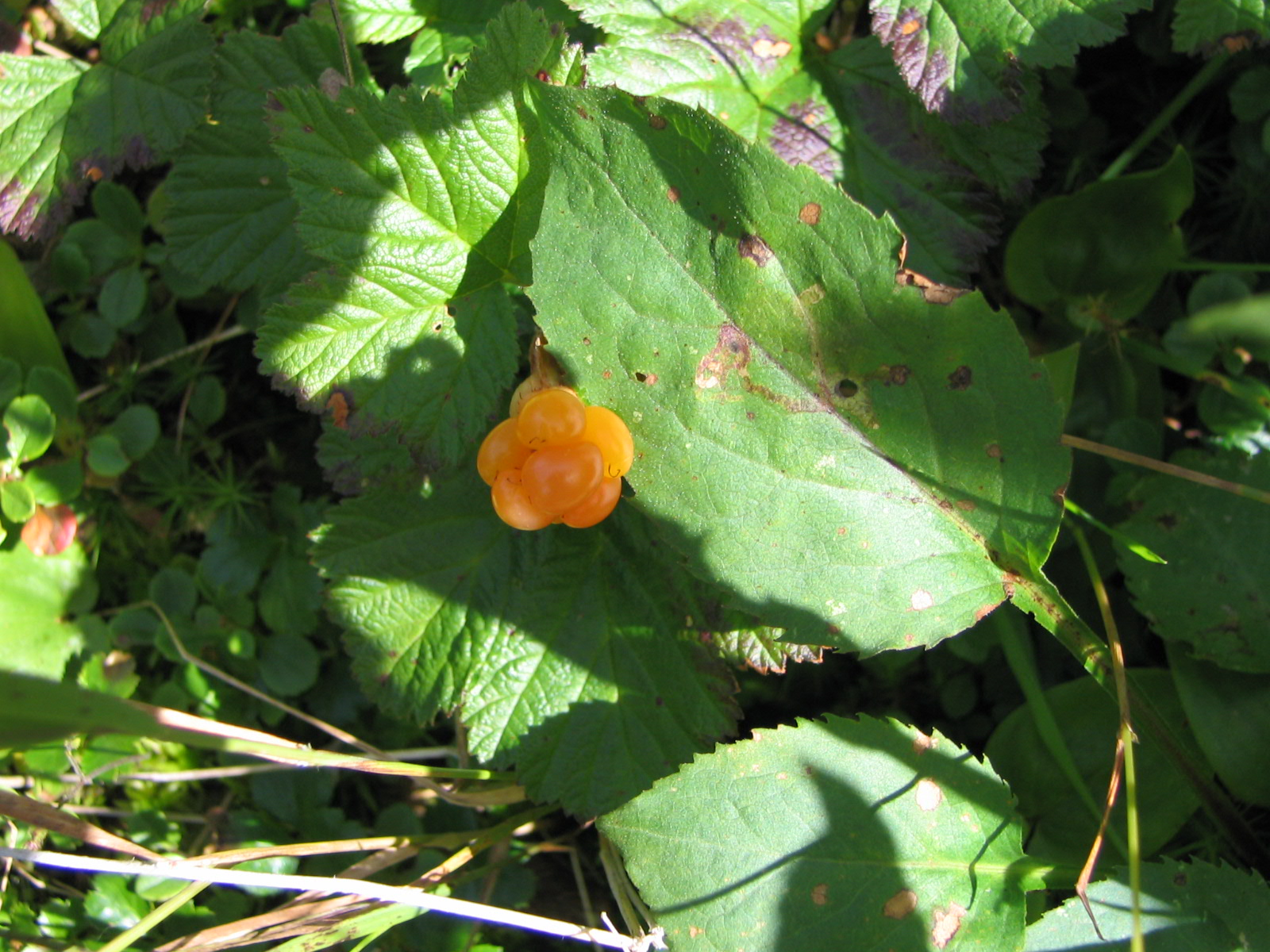
Rubus chamaemorus Linné. — Ronce petit-mûrier. — Mûres blanches, Blackbières, Plaquebières, Chicoutés. — (Cloudberry).

== Fauna ==
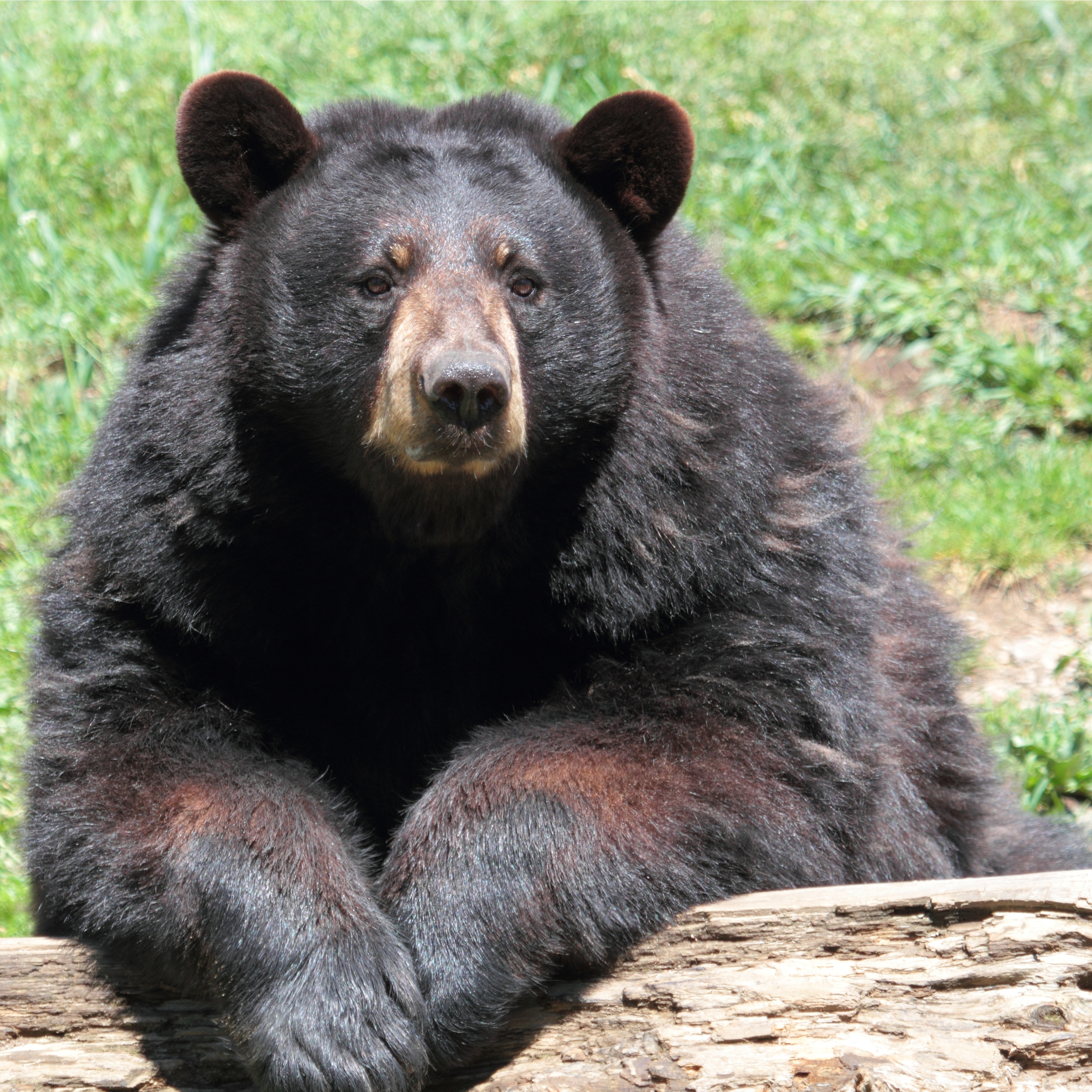
Ursus americanus. - Ours noir. - (Black Bear)

=== Terrestrial mammals ===
During the summers of 1964 and 1965, during geological research, Jean Depatie with a team of geologists and students, assisted by 3 canoemen and lumberjacks, plus a cook, explored 440 square miles of a territory stretching from Sept-Îles to Blanc Sablon, in the Lac à l'Ours region. In the field, scientists noted an abundance of Canadian beavers, a few otters and American mink, many hares, partridges and a multitude of ducks. Caribou and moose are scarce while black bears and red foxes abound.

- Castor canadensis. -Castor du Canada -North American Beaver.
- Lontra canadensis. – Loutre du Canada. -North American river otter
- Ondatra zibethicus L. – Rat musqué. -Muskrat
- Vulpes vulpes L. -Renard roux. -Red fox
- Tamiasciurus hudsonicus. -Écureil roux - American red squirrel
- Lepus americanus. – Snowhoe hare. Lièvre d'Amérique
- Mustela erminea L. – Stoat. -Hermine
- Ursus americanus. - Ours noir. - (Black Bear)
- Alces alces. Orignal, Élan. -(Moose)
- Certain species of bats and a number of small rodents

=== Marine mammals ===
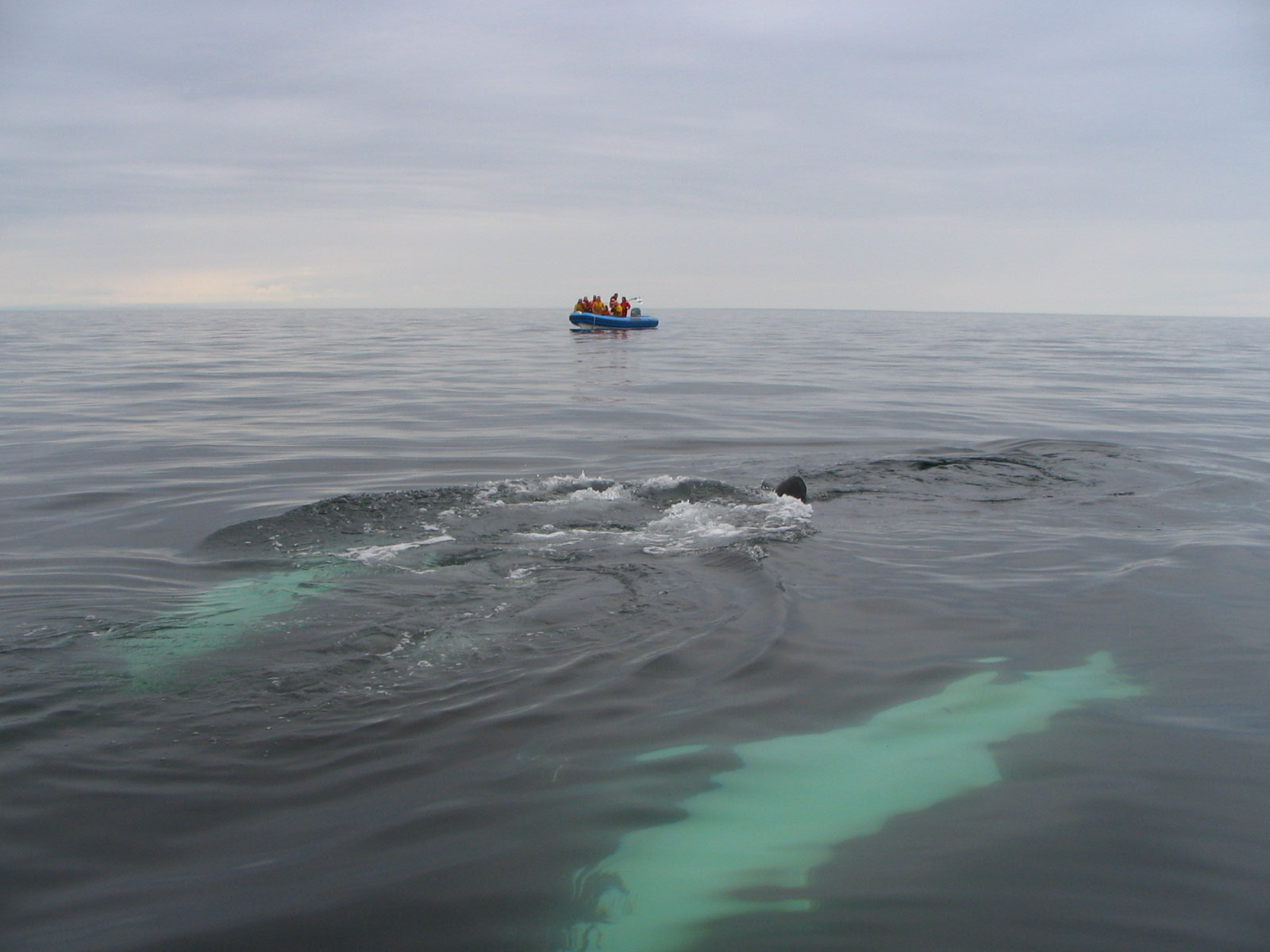
Whale watching, with members of the Mingan Island Cetacean Study (MICS) team 2004

The waters of the St. Lawrence Estuary are internationally recognized as a vital feeding ground for rare or common species of marine mammals.

- Blue whale, Right whale, St. Lawrence beluga, Harbour porpoise, Fin whale, Harbour seal, Humpback whale, Minke whale, Atlantic white-side dolphin, Sperm whale, Grey seal, Harp seal

=== Birds ===
Many species of birds can be observed in the Côte-Nord region and the Mingan RCM, including Havre-Saint-Pierre and in Mingan Archipelago National Park Reserve

- Warblers, Terns, Ospreys, Passerines, Razorbills, many waders
- Haliaeetus leucocephalus. -Bald Eagle. -Pygargue à tête blanche
- Somateria mollissima. -Common Eider. -Eider à duvet
- Fratercula arctica. Macareux moine. -Atlantic Puffin
- Bucephala islandica. -Barrow's Goldeneye. -Garrot d'Islande

== See also ==
- List of regional county municipalities and equivalent territories in Quebec
