= Lac-Jérôme =

- Unorganized territory
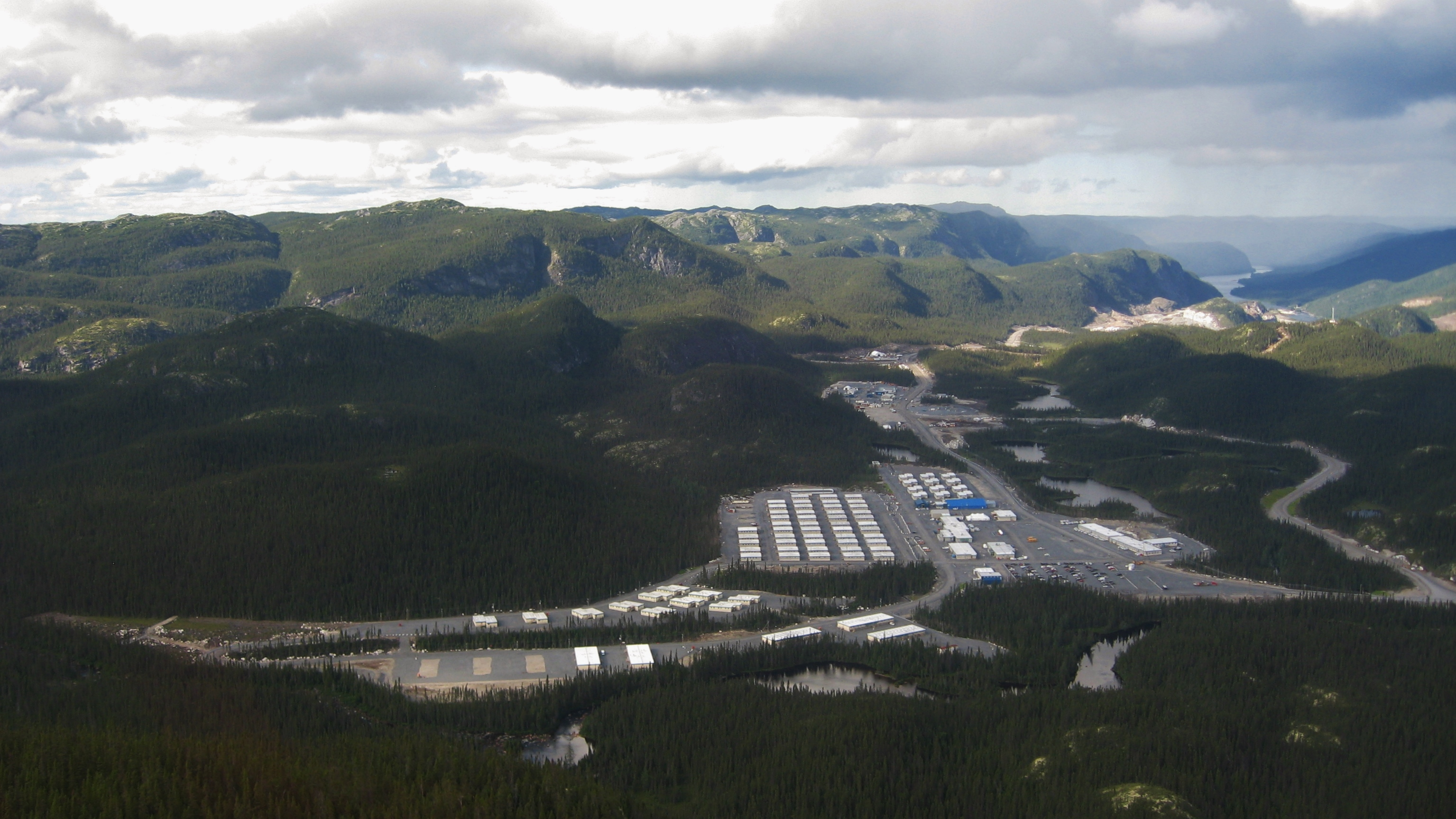
- Hydroelectric complex at Romaine-3

- Location in Côte-Nord region of Quebec
- Coordinates: 50°51′N 63°33′W
- Country: Canada
- Province: Quebec
- Region: Côte-Nord
- RCM: Minganie
- Constituted: January 1, 1986

Government
  - Federal riding: Côte-Nord—Kawawachikamach—Nitassinan
  - Prov. riding: Duplessis

Area
  - Total: 46,531.86 km^{2} (17,966.05 sq mi)
  - Land: 42,689.68 km^{2} (16,482.58 sq mi)

Population (2021)
  - Total: 0
  - Density: 0/km^{2} (0/sq mi)
  - Pop (2016-21): N/A
  - Dwellings: 0
- Time zone: UTC−05:00 (EST)
  - Summer (DST): UTC−04:00 (EDT)
- Highways: No major routes

Lac-Jérôme (French pronunciation: [lak ʒeʁom]) is an unorganized territory in the Côte-Nord region of Quebec, Canada, part of the Minganie Regional County Municipality. It is named after Lake Jérôme, a small lake on the Mingan River. The Manitou River originates in Lac-Jérôme in Lake Caobus.

== Demographics ==
The area has been completely uninhabited since at least 1991.

Historical Census Data - Lac-Jérôme, Quebec

Year	Pop.
1991	0
1996	0
2001	0
2006	0

Year	Pop.
2011	0
2016	0
2021	0

Source: Statistics Canada

== See also ==
- List of unorganized territories in Quebec
