= Zec Trinité =

- Location within Quebec
- Location: Canada, Quebec, Manicouagan Regional County Municipality
- Nearest city: Baie-Trinité
- Coordinates: 49°30′10″N 67°21′50″W
- Area: 328.20 square kilometres (126.72 sq mi)
- Established: 1986

The ZEC Trinity is a "zone d'exploitation contrôlée" (controlled harvesting zone) (ZEC) in the municipality of the town of Baie-Trinité, in the Manicouagan Regional County Municipality (RCM), in the administrative region of Côte-Nord (North Shore), in Quebec, in Canada.

Zec Trinity administers a territory that is connected to the south and west to the Zec de la Rivière-de-la-Trinité which administers the area of the river for recreational fishing.

== Geography ==
Zec Trinity is bounded on:

- South by the Trinity River which then flows west to east to go pour into Trinity Bay West; and route 138 between the hamlet "Les Islets-Caribou" (north) and Nadeau Lake (southwest);
- West by the Trinity River, which then flows from north to south;
- East by Little Trinity River, which flows from north to south.

The main streams of Zec are: Caribou, "du Dôme", Deroy and Genest.

== History ==
The "Company St Laurence Paper Ltd" held exclusive fishing rights on the rivers Great Trinity and Little Trinity from 1930s to early 1960s, when it has assigned its rights to Domtar. Formerly, many wealthy people have joined the Domtar exclusive club.

In May 1976, the Trinity River was released, after about half a century of exclusive lease for end to private, where only the leaders and guests of the company had the privilege to access it. Several speakers from the public yearned to participate in the management of wildlife, recreation and tourism resources of the area. Following representations of Baie-Trinité citizens, the MTCP has transferred property, facilities and proprietary rights of the company to "Société d'Aménagement de Baie-Trinité inc" (Development Company Trinity Bay Inc) newly formed. At the time, this new mode of management of a salmon river by a non-profit set a precedent. In 1978, the "réserve de chasse et pêche de Baie-Trinité" (Reserve Fish and Game of Trinity Bay) was created through an order in council, adding the two existing reserves (Trinity River and Small Trinity River) a territory of 356 square kilometers.

Subsequently, the Trinity River has achieved the status of zone d'exploitation contrôlée (controlled harvesting zone) or the Rivière de la Trinité. In 1982, due to its geographical location, its relative importance and its facilities (metering station and recording salmon), the Great Trinity River served as a dedicated study area for salmon. This project was made possible with the proper operation of the fish ladder at the dam of the same Great Trinity River. This project allows the Company that manages the River Grande Trinity to keep a high potential for the future of salmon.

Since the founding of the "Development of Trinity Bay Company," the presidents who have succeeded are: Jacques Landry, Louis C. Roussy, Richard Dion, Georges Gagnon and Denis Lejeune.

Many salmon anglers now set their sights on the river, so attending annually. Located on the north bank of the Gulf of St. Lawrence, 95 kilometers from Baie-Comeau, the river flows from north to south on 74 miles before emptying into the Bay to height of the town of Baie-Trinité

== Toponymy ==
Previously, this area was designated "réserve de chasse et pêche de Baie-Trinité" (Reserve Fish and Game of Trinity Bay). The name "ZEC Trinity" is directly derived from other names related sector: Trinity River Great, Little Trinity River and Trinity Bay. The name "ZEC Trinity" was formalized on June 25, 1987, at the Bank of place names in the Commission de toponymie du Québec (Geographical Names Board of Quebec).

== See also ==
=== Related articles ===
- Baie-Trinité, municipality
- Manicouagan Regional County Municipality, a (MRC)
- Côte-Nord (North Shore), administrative region of Quebec
- Zec de la Rivière-de-la-Trinité
- Zone d'exploitation contrôlée (Controlled harvesting zone) (ZEC)

=== External links ===
- "Official website of the MRC Manicouagan".
- "Official website of the Municipality of Baie-Trinité". Archived from the original on 2014-12-16.
