= Zec de la Rivière-de-la-Trinité =

- Location within Quebec
- Location: Canada, Quebec, Manicouagan Regional County Municipality
- Nearest city: Rivière-aux-Outardes, unorganized territory
- Coordinates: 49°30′04″N 67°27′40″W
- Area: Length of 73 kilometres (45 mi)
- Established: 1986

The ZEC de la Rivière-de-la-Trinité is a zone d'exploitation contrôlée ("controlled harvesting zone") (ZEC) located in the unorganized territory of Rivière-aux-Outardes, in the Manicouagan Regional County Municipality, in the administrative region of Côte-Nord (North Shore), in Quebec, in Canada.

== Geography ==
This river descends in wilderness from north to south. It includes 74 km of river accessible to users. In the southern part of the ZEC, the river bifurcates at 90 degrees toward east, to go empty into the bay of Baie-Trinité. The southern part of the river is easily accessible by the route 138 which follows the sector 1 of the Zec Trinité (southern part) and also a segment in sector 2 on a distance of 11 kilometers. A recently converted forest road is now passable so ensures accessibility to the other part of the sector 2 on its entire length up to the bridge of the mille 22.

On the edge of the Gulf of St. Lawrence, Zec de la Rivière-de-la-Trinité features with a magnificent overview on the bay of Baie-Trinité:

- 10 equipped cottages,
- 40 campsites offering three services, as well as sanitary facilities with washer dryer. The sites have a level of about 50% shade.

== Hunting and Fishing ==
Because of the climate of the Côte-Nord (North Shore), the water level of the Trinity River can vary considerably. It is characterized as a "river of flood" because of its frequent shots of water. Anglers should consider this changing behavior of the river. The Trinity River has 67 pits for salmon reproduction, in four sectors of the Zec. In the Zec, the pits subject to quotas are within the sectors:

- estuary, pits 1 and 2;
- downstream, pits 3-16.

The pits of the river have very different characteristics including their morphology and size. Recreational fishing is practiced only by wading, except for a segment of the river where fishing is practiced with canoe or from the pit of the mille 22 up to the pit 16. This is the upstream sector from the pit 23 to pit 54.

== Toponymy ==
The name "Zec de la Rivière-de-la-Trinité" was formalized on June 25, 1987 at the Bank of place names in the Commission de toponymie du Québec (Geographical Names Board of Quebec)

== See also ==
=== Related articles ===
- Rivière-aux-Outardes, an unorganized territory
- Manicouagan Regional County Municipality (MRC)
- Baie-Trinité, a municipality
- Zec Trinité
- Trinity River
- Zone d'exploitation contrôlée (controlled harvesting zone) (ZEC)
