= Trinité River =

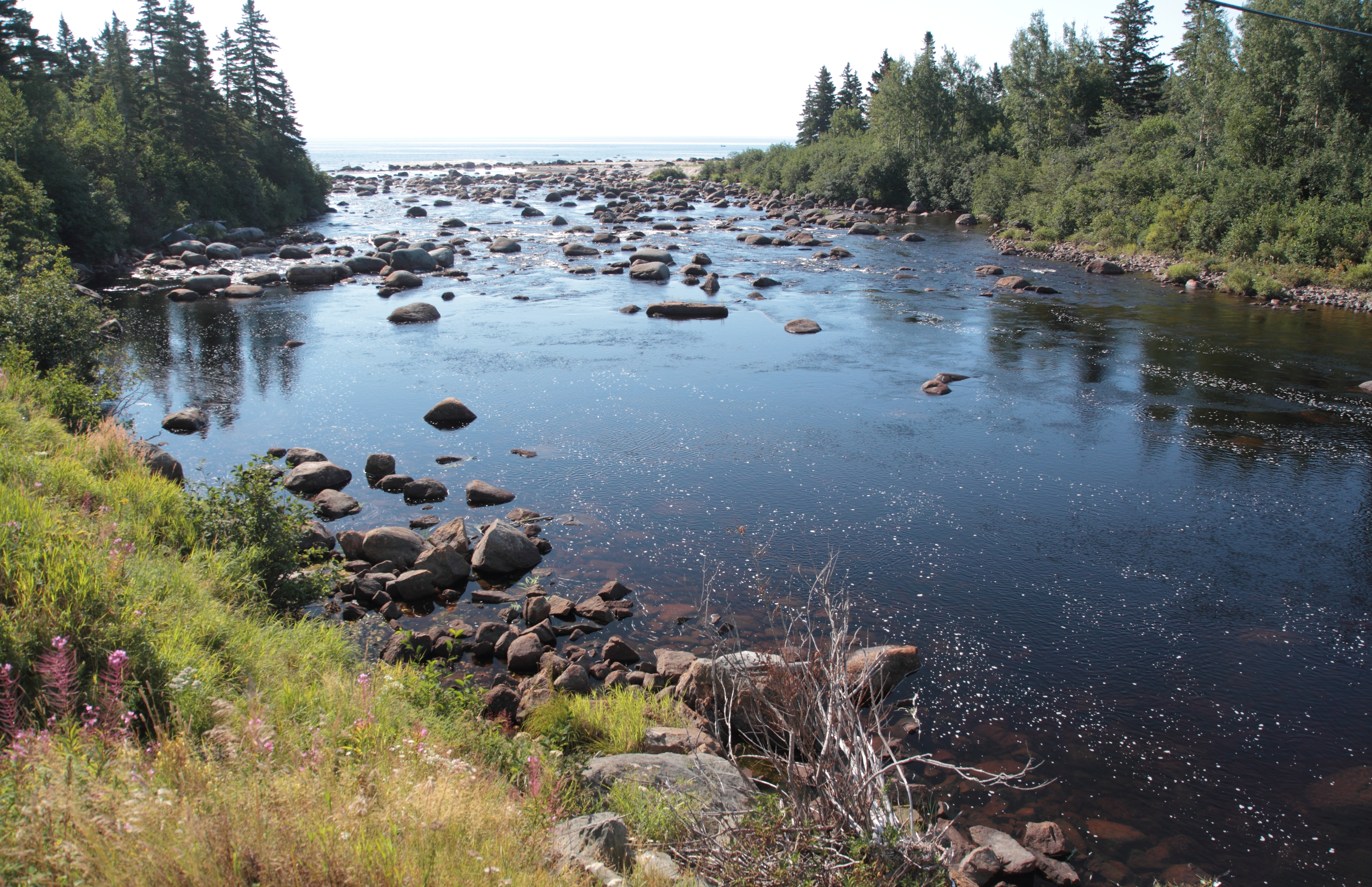
- Mouth of the river

- Location within Quebec
- Native name: Rivière de la Trinité (French)

Location
- Country: Canada
- Province: Quebec
- Region: Côte-Nord
- RCM: Manicouagan, Sept-Rivières

Physical characteristics
- Mouth
  - location: Baie-Trinité
  - coordinates: 49.418167°N 67.302542°W
  - elevation: 0 metres (0 ft)

Basin features
- River system: Gulf of Saint Lawrence

The Trinité River (French: Rivière de la Trinité, pronounced [ʁivjɛʁ də la tʁinite]), or Grande Trinité River is a river in the Côte-Nord region of Quebec, Canada. Salmon fishing is allowed, subject to limits.

== Course ==
The Trinité River is in Baie-Trinité, Manicouagan, Quebec. It is 75 kilometres (47 mi) long. The river runs through a winding valley in the Canadian Shield before entering the Gulf of Saint Lawrence beside the village of Baie-Trinité. There are a few small lakes in the northern, Sept-Rivieres part of the river basin, including Lac Washamahwun, Lac Lanctot, Lac Rimouski and Lac Fox. The river flows slowly through 67 shallow fishing holes interspersed with large rocks, with a steeper section near the end where it runs faster. The river is accessible from Quebec Route 138.

== Environment ==
A map of the Ecological regions of Quebec shows the upper portion of the river rising and flowing south through the eastern spruce/moss domain of the boreal zone. Most of the river flows through the fir/white birch domain of the boreal zone. The average annual temperature in the region is 0 °C (32 °F). The warmest month is August, when the average temperature is 16 °C (61 °F), and the coldest is February, with −19 °C (−2 °F).

== Dam ==
Salmon use the fish ladder at the Grande Trinité River dam to reach the upper part of the river. This was an old wooden structure built in 1929. It collapsed in May 2009 and a CDN$4.5 million project was started to build a replacement concrete structure. As part of the process cofferdams were built upstream and downstream. The fish could still pass, but fishing was disrupted.

== Fishing ==
Most of the river is managed for recreational fishing by the Zec de la Rivière-de-la-Trinité, which provides campsites, cabins and boat rentals. Every year 700 to 800 salmon return. The healthy salmon population is an important attraction to visitors. There are also sea trout. The fishing season is from June to mid-September.

== Management regimes ==
The Saint-Lawrence Paper company held the exclusive fishing rights to the Grande Trinité and Petite Trinité rivers from the 1930s until the early 1960s, when it sold them to Domtar. The river was used by wealthy Domtar executives and their guests until May 1976, when it was released to the non-profit Baie-Trinité Development Corporation in May 1976 in response to pressure from the people of Baie-Trinité.

In 1978 the Baie-Trinité fishing and hunting reserve was created to cover the 356 kilometres (221 mi) of territory between the existing Rivière-Trinité and Petite-Trinité reserves. The Rivière-Trinité reserve became the Zone d'exploitation controlée (Zec (Note: A Zone d'exploitation contrôlée (Zec) is a zone where exploitation of natural resources is controlled. The land between the Trinité and Petit Trinité rivers, is managed by the Zec Trinité.)) Rivière de la Trinité. In 1982 the Grande Trinité River was considered a representative salmon river of the upper Côte-Nord, and became an "experimental river" where researchers began to study salmon.

== Sources ==
- Historique de la Rivière Trinité (in French), APCN / SABT
- MRC de Sept-Rivières (PDF) (map) (in French), Gouvernement du Québec, 23 August 2006
- NASA Earth Observations Data Set Index, NASA
- Reconstruction du barrage cet été (in French), Radio-Canada, 19 May 2009
- Rivière de la Trinité, NRC: Natural Resources Canada
- Rivière de la Trinité (in French), Zec Trinité
- Saucier, J.-P.; Robitaille, A.; Grondin, P.; Bergeron, J.-F.; Gosselin, J. (2011), Les régions écologiques du Québec méridional (PDF) (map), 4 (in French), Ministère des Ressources naturelles et de la Faune
