= Baie-Trinité =

- Village municipality
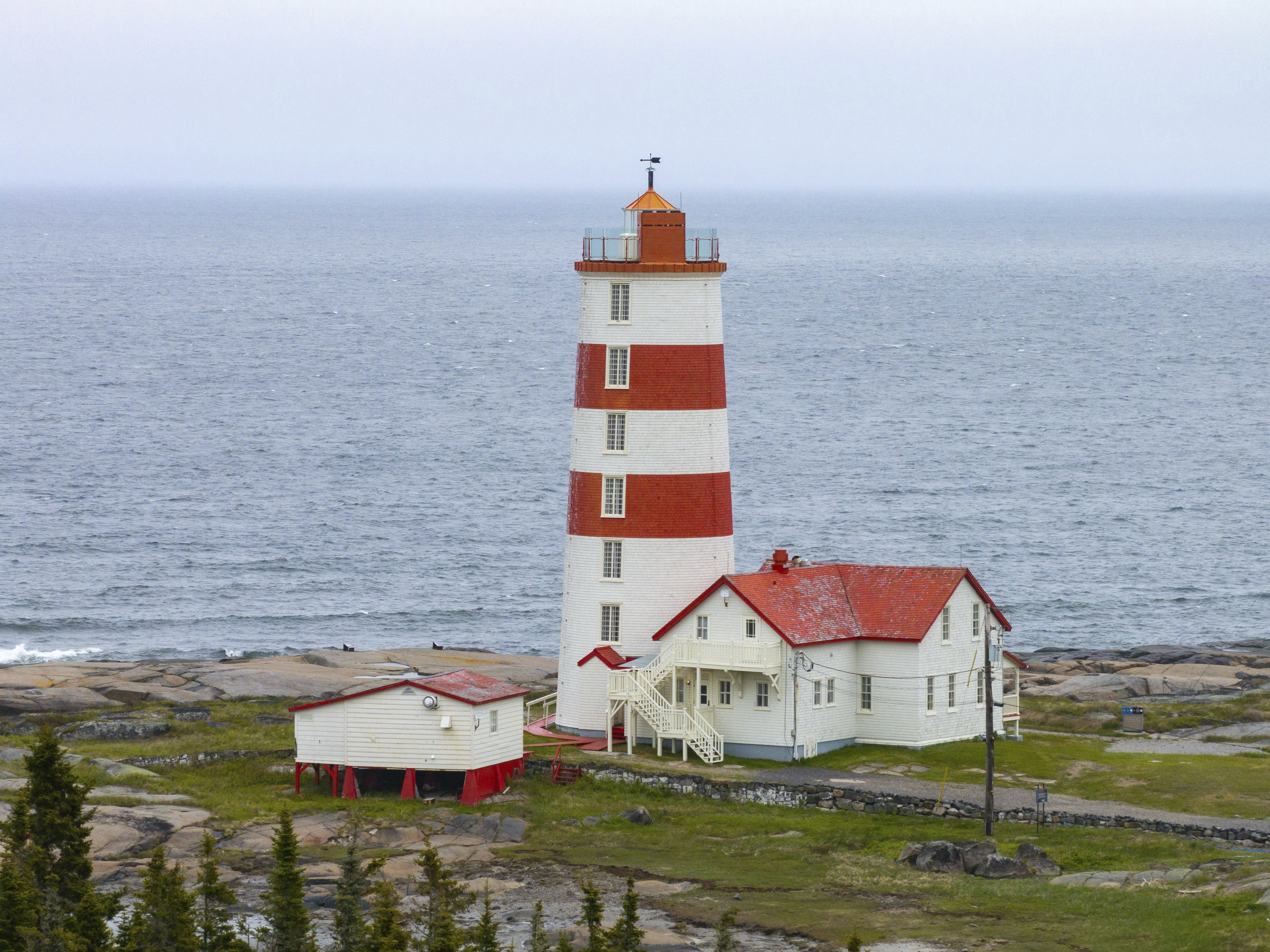
- Pointe-des-Monts hamlet lightouse, a National historic site of Canada

- Location in Côte-Nord region of Quebec
- Coordinates: 49°25′N 67°18′W
- Country: Canada
- Province: Quebec
- Region: Côte-Nord
- RCM: Manicouagan
- Settled: 1840
- Constituted: January 1, 1955

Government
  - Mayor: Étienne Baillargeon
  - Federal riding: Côte-Nord—Kawawachikamach—Nitassinan
  - Prov. riding: René-Lévesque

Area
  - Total: 538.74 km^{2} (208.01 sq mi)
  - Land: 417.48 km^{2} (161.19 sq mi)

Population (2021)
  - Total: 438
  - Density: 1/km^{2} (2.6/sq mi)
  - Pop (2016-21): ▲7.6%
- Time zone: UTC−5 (EST)
  - Summer (DST): UTC−4 (EDT)
- Postal code(s): G0H 1A0
- Area codes: 418 and 581
- Highways: R-138
- MAMROT code: 96005
- Toponymie info: 3121
- Website: baie-trinite.quebec

Baie-Trinité (French pronunciation: [bɛ tʁinite]; Village Municipality) is part of the Manicouagan Regional County Municipality, in Côte-Nord region, Quebec province, Canada.

In addition to Baie-Trinité itself, the village municipality also includes the hamlet of Pointe-des-Monts, site of Pointe-des-Monts Lighthouse.

== Pointe-des-Monts Lighthouse ==
The Pointe-des-Monts Lighthouse, a National historic site of Canada, was built in 1829–1830 on a point that ancient geographers, since Samuel de Champlain (1567-1655) himself, classified as the demarcation point between the St. Lawrence River and the Gulf of St. Lawrence.

In 2023, all the facilities of the Pointe-des-Monts lighthouse include the lighthouse, the keeper's house and the footbridge. Over time, since its installation in 1830, several buildings have been demolished, as example, given the impressive number of shipwrecks at this time, a provision depot for shipwreck victims was built in 1831.

Pointe-des-Monts Lighthouse

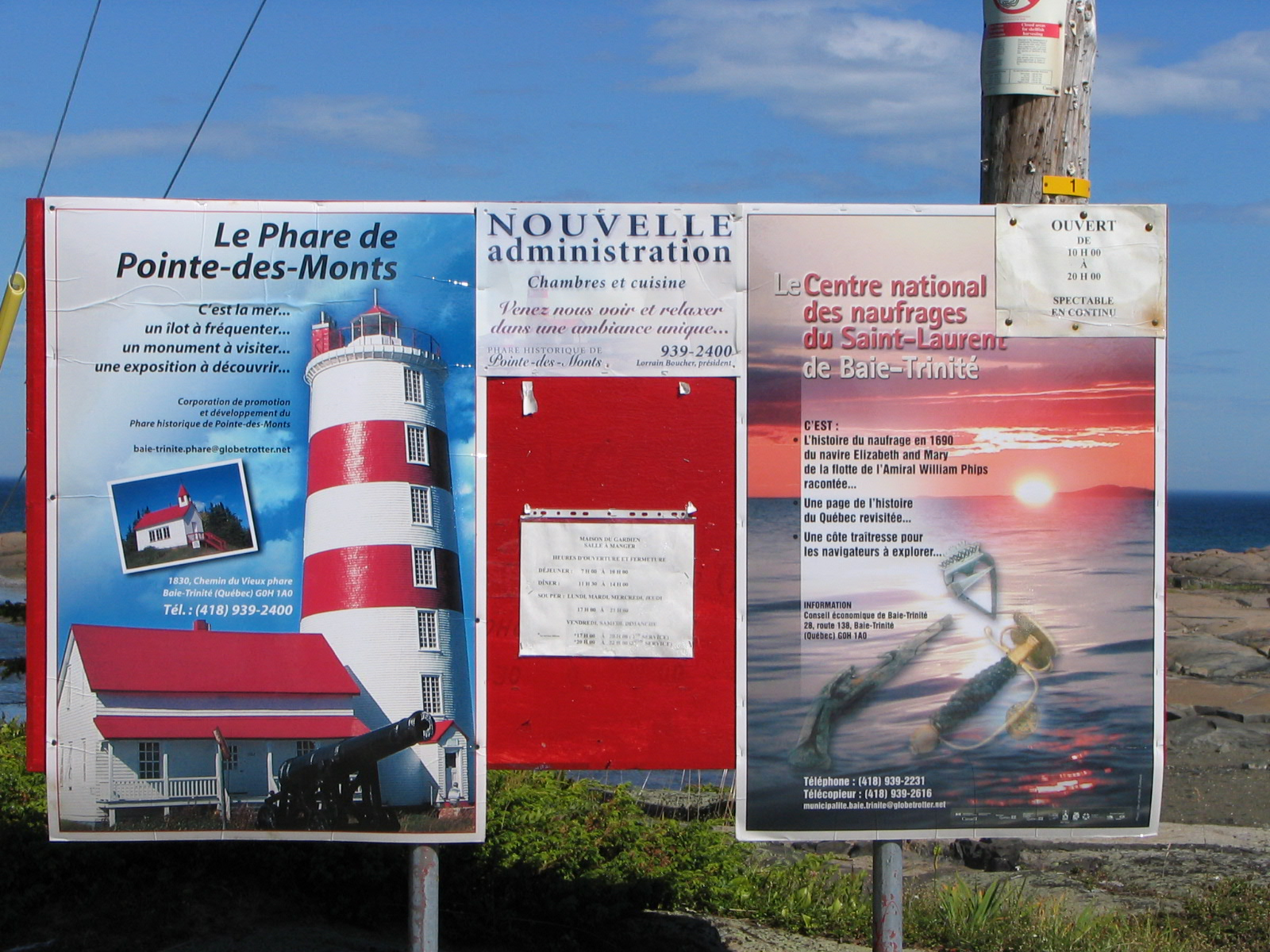
Information panel

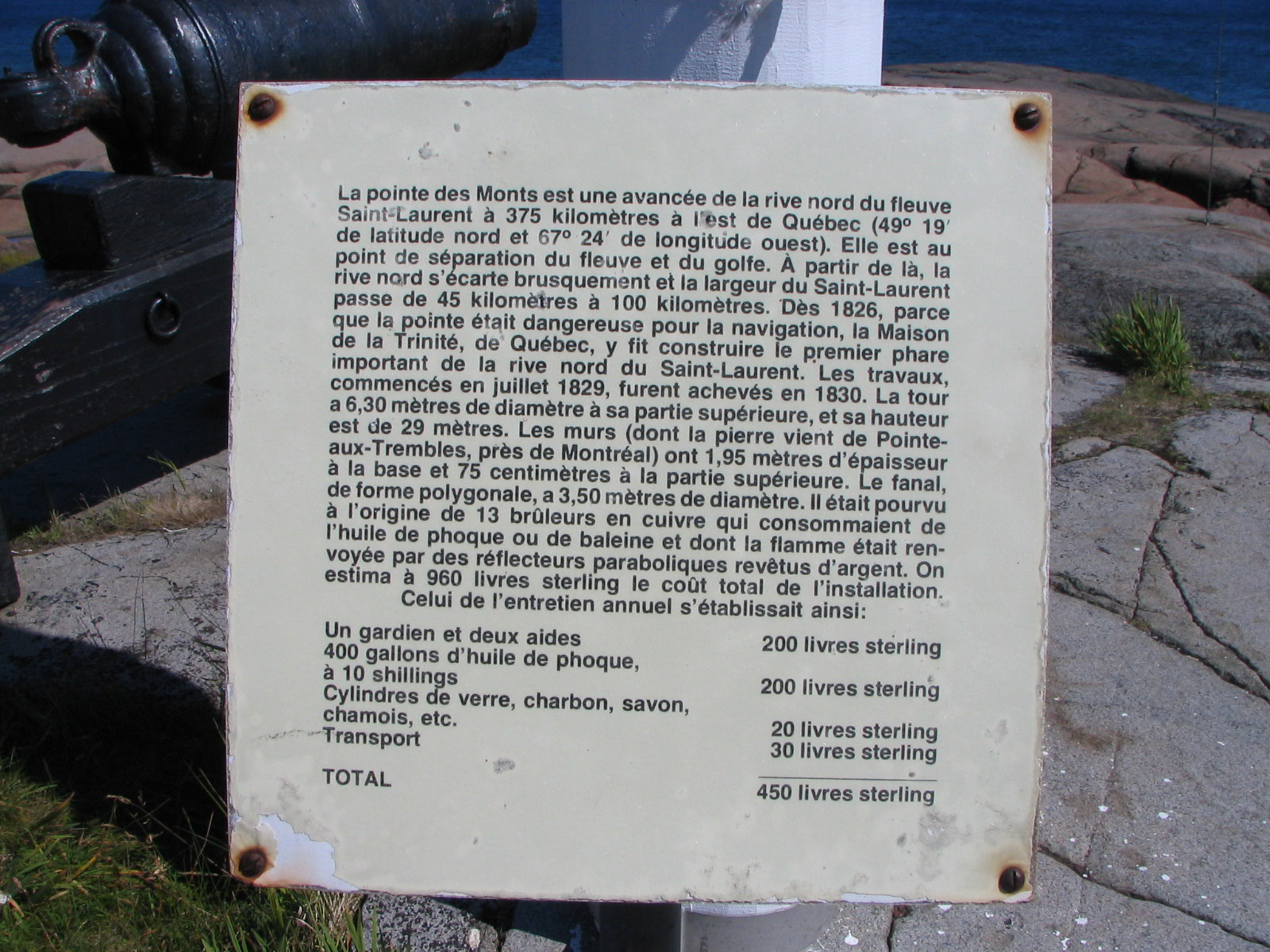
Information panel

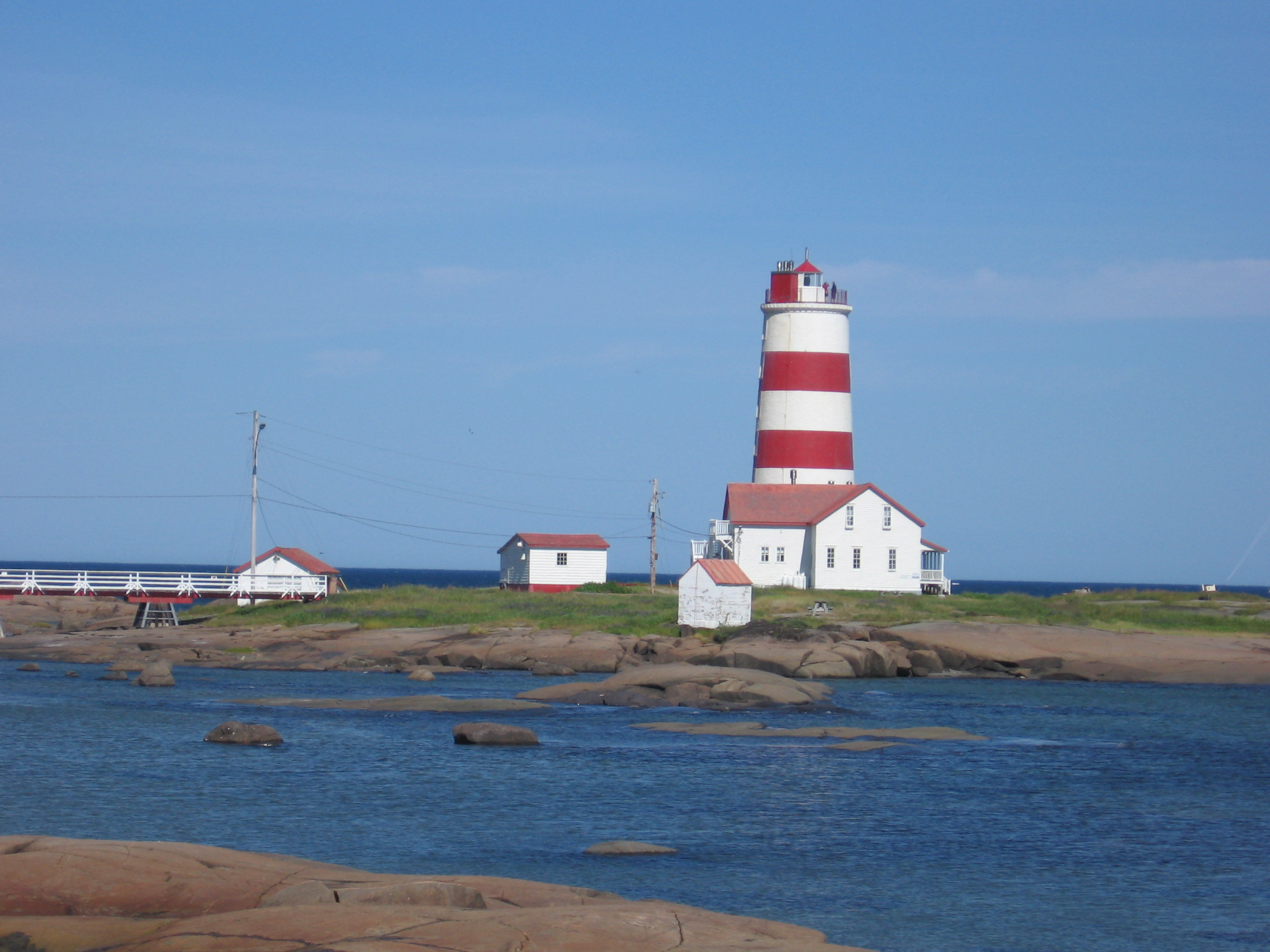
Keeper's house and outbuildings

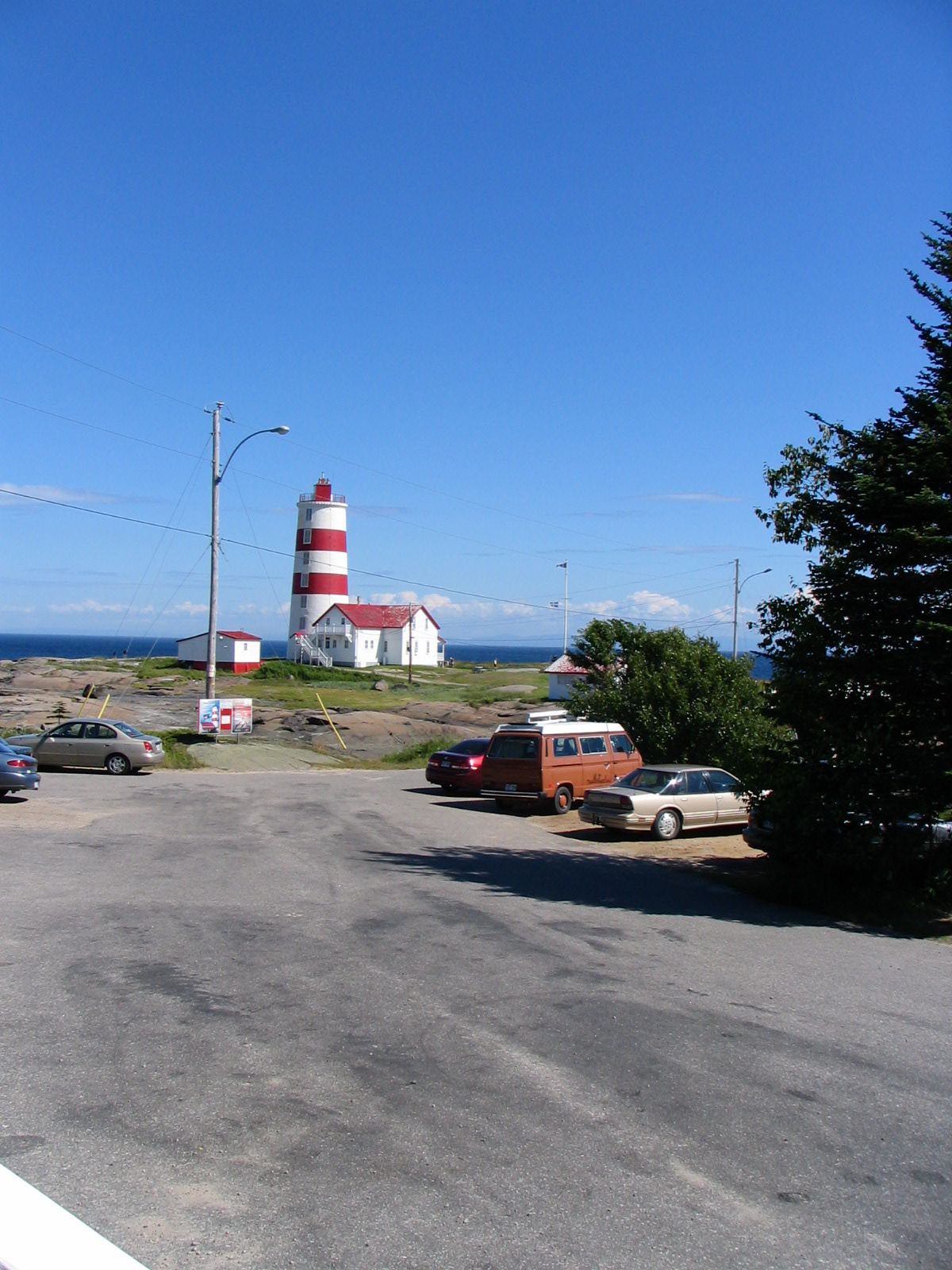
The keeper's house, the outbuildings, parking lot

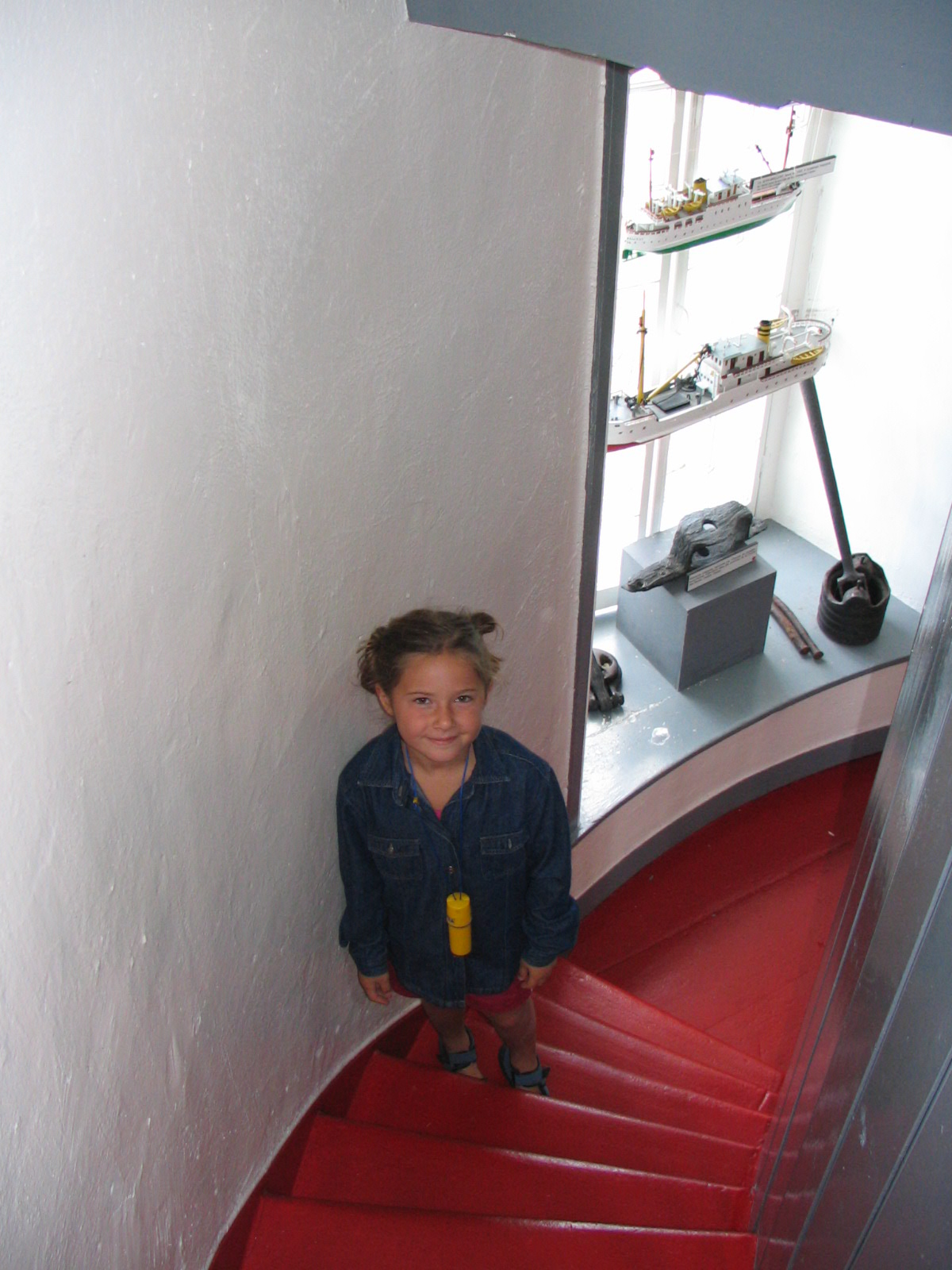
Interested visitor, stairs and artifacts

== Toponymy ==
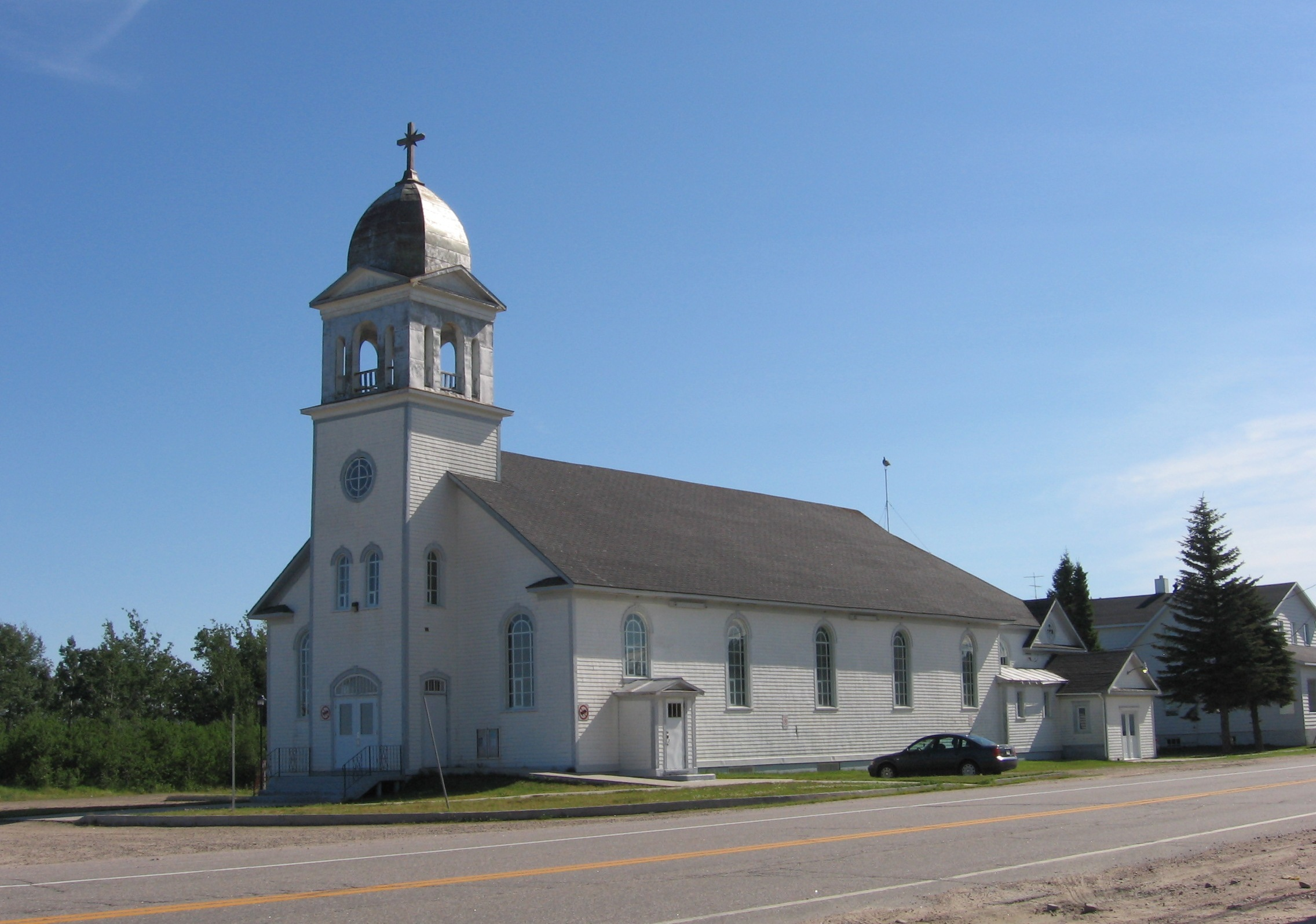
Baie-Trinité church

The village municipality are named after the small Trinity Bay into which the Trinity River drains. The river's name may be attributed to Jacques Cartier who sailed by this river on Trinity Sunday in 1536. The first permanent settlers came in 1840, the Baie-de-la-Trinité Mission was established in 1898.

== Geography ==
The municipality is located on the north shore of the Gulf of St. Lawrence at the mouth of the Trinity River (French: Rivière de la Trinité), a salmon river which flows through the village.

The main access to the municipality is Route 138, also known as the Whale Route. The major economic sectors are forestry and fisheries.

Gulf of St Lawrence

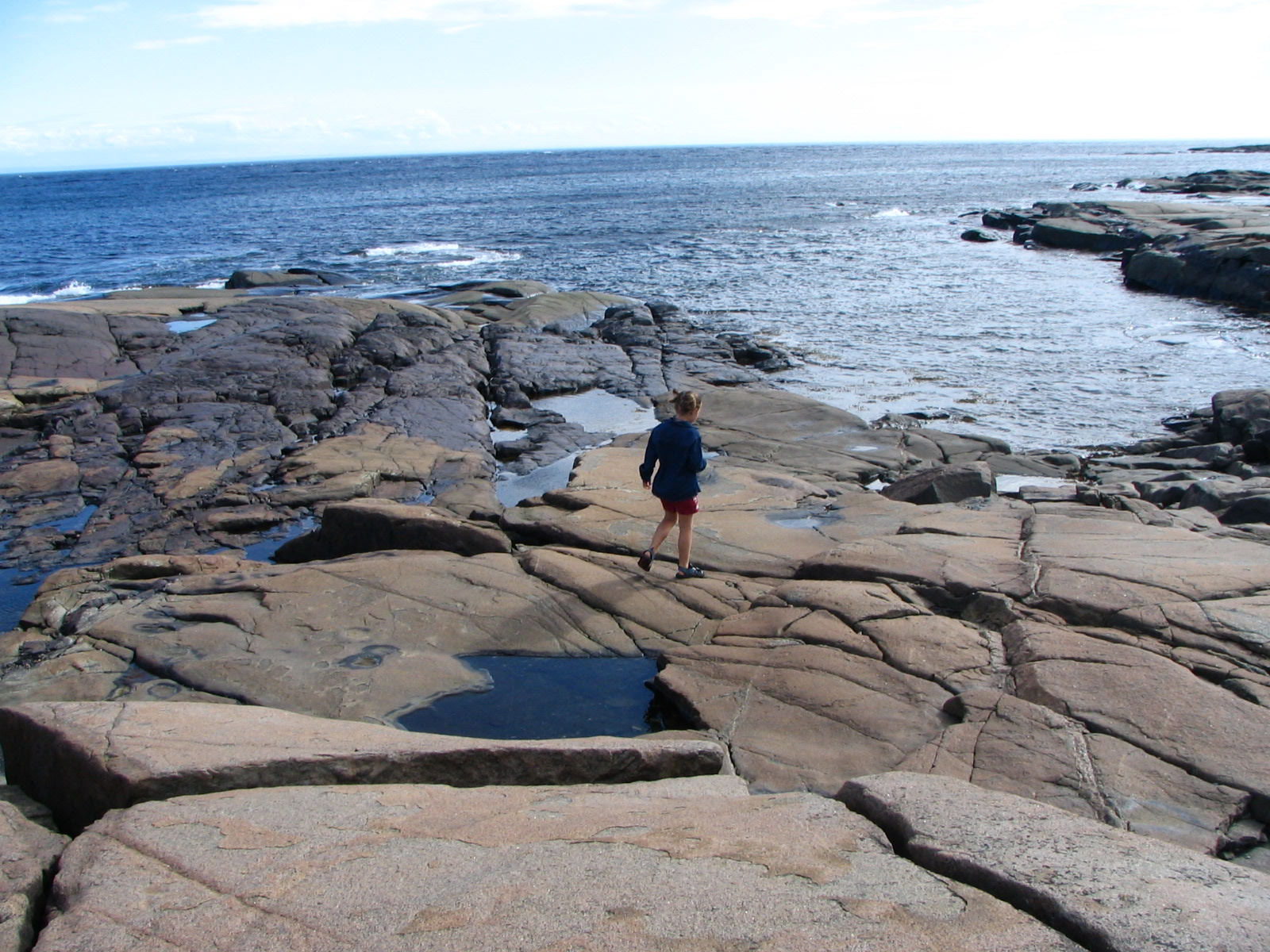
From the top of the lighthouse Pointe des Monts bedrock, gulf side

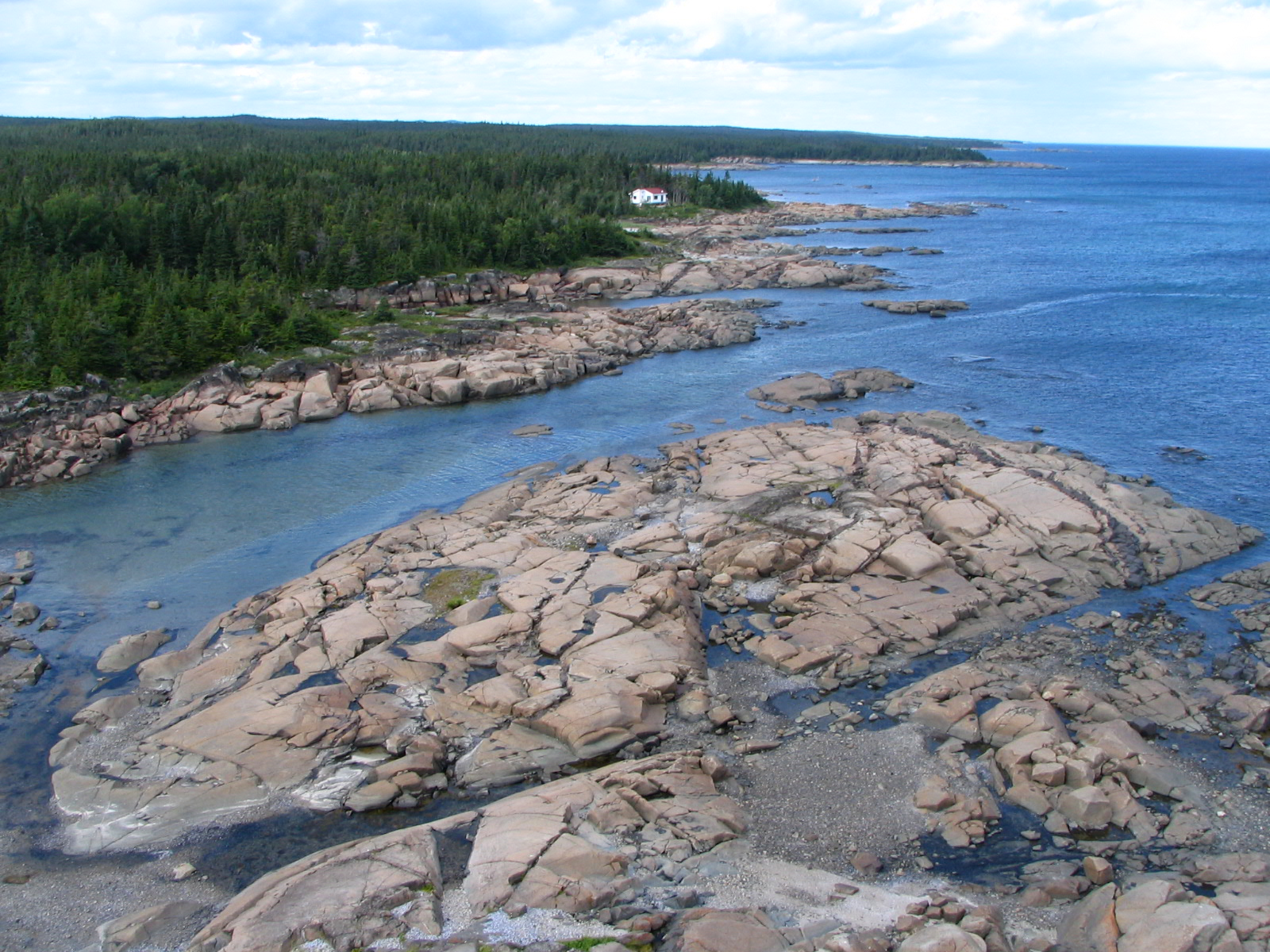
From the top of the lighthouse, Pointe des Monts bedrock, estuary side

== Ludger-Champagne rest area ==
The rest area belongs to the Ministère des Transports du Québec, it is located in Baie-Trinité, on the Route des Baleines, (Route 138), between Labrie and Jourdain streets, it recalls the memory of Ludger Champagne (1929-2020).

Mr. Champagne founded the Club 4 H of Baie-Trinité in 1966 and was an important player in the construction of the building that housed the 4-H relay, a rest area for the local population and travellers. The 4-H Clubs of Quebec, which brought together young people aged 8 to 18, were committed to the protection and conservation of the environment. The 4-H movement was created in 1912 in the United States and established in Quebec in 1942 by the Quebec Forestry Association.

Rest area Ludger-Champagne

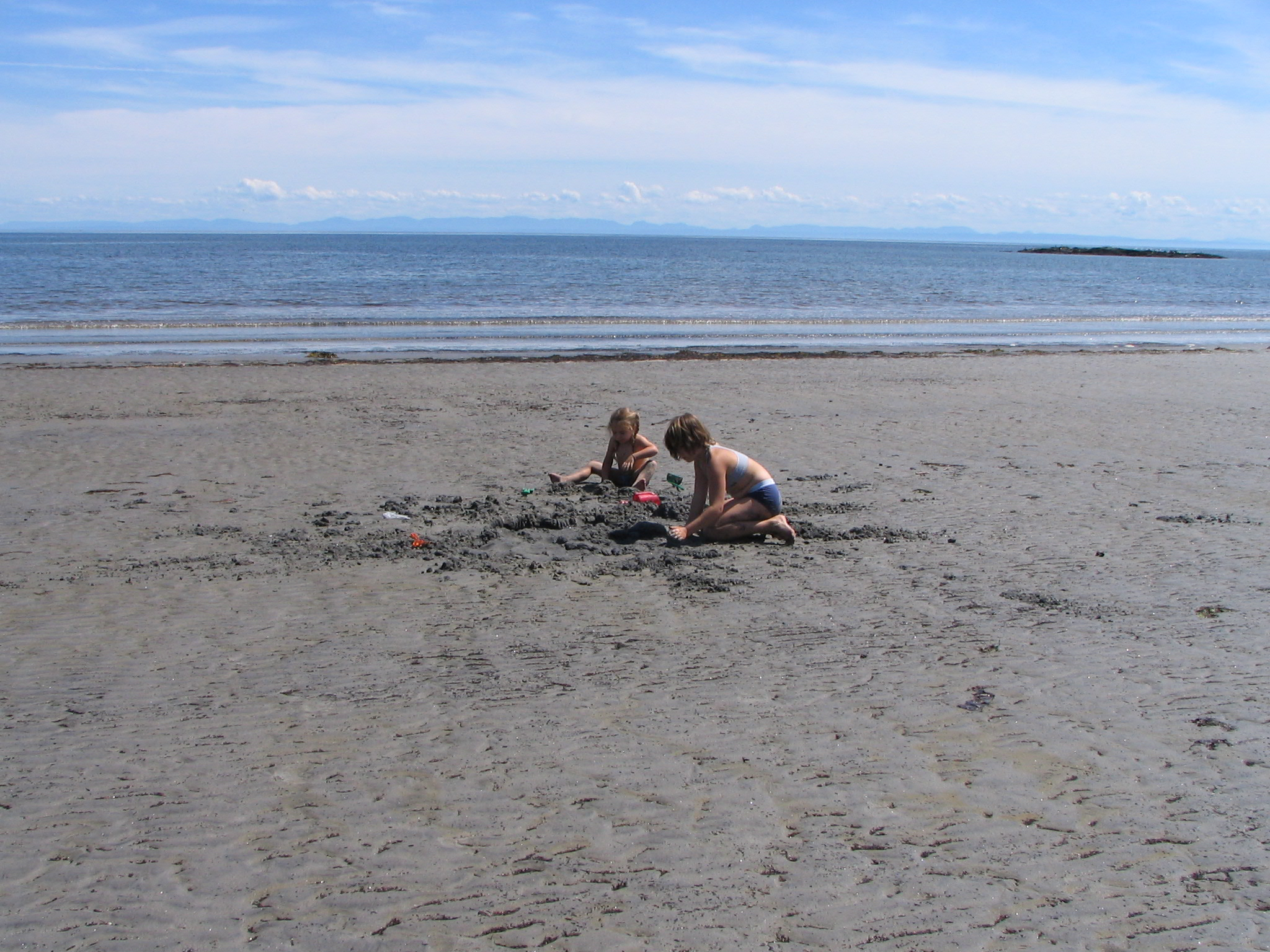
Beach, gulf of St Lawrence

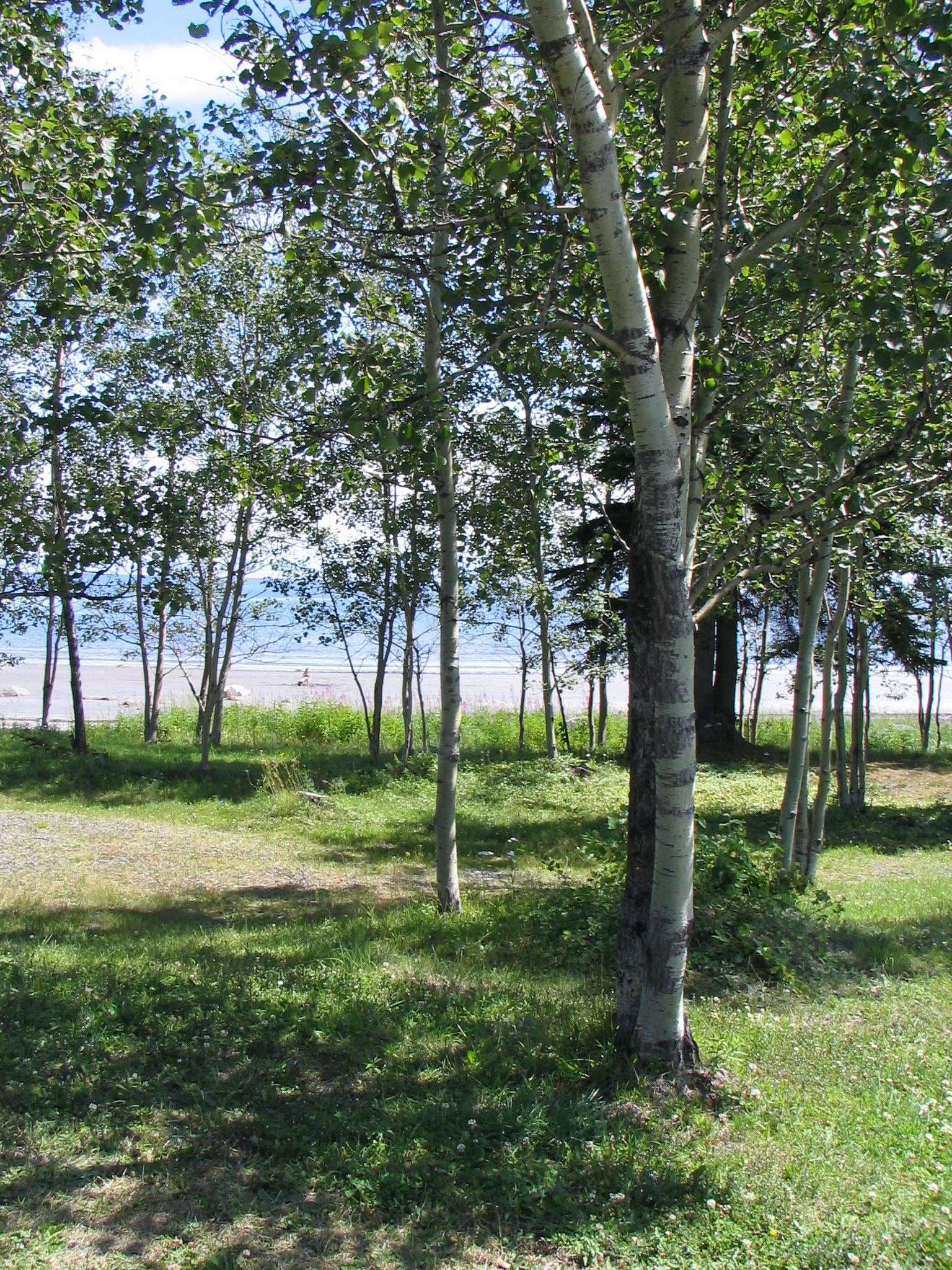
Route 138, picnic area, beach, gulf of St Lawrence

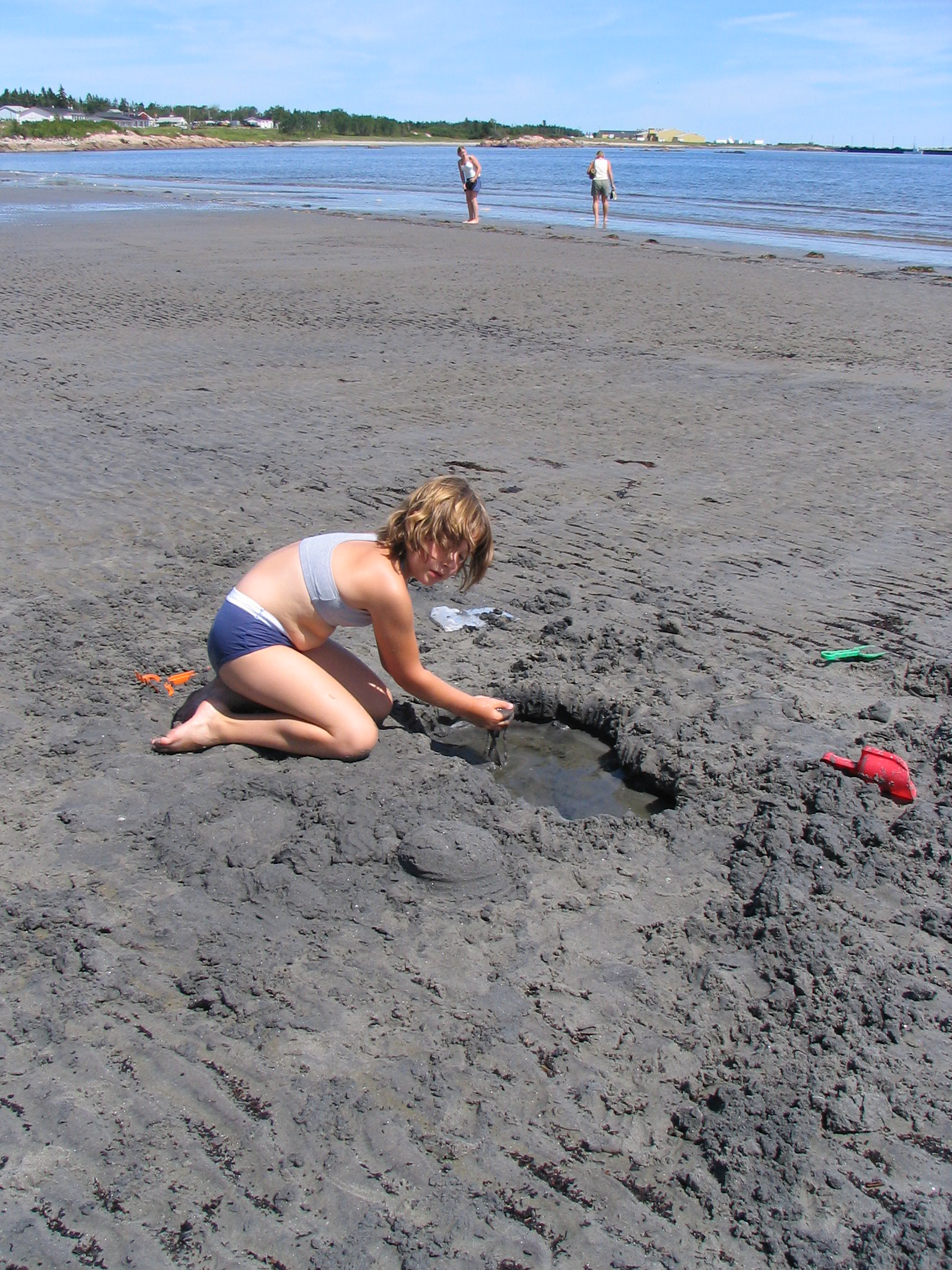
Beach, gulf of St Lawrence

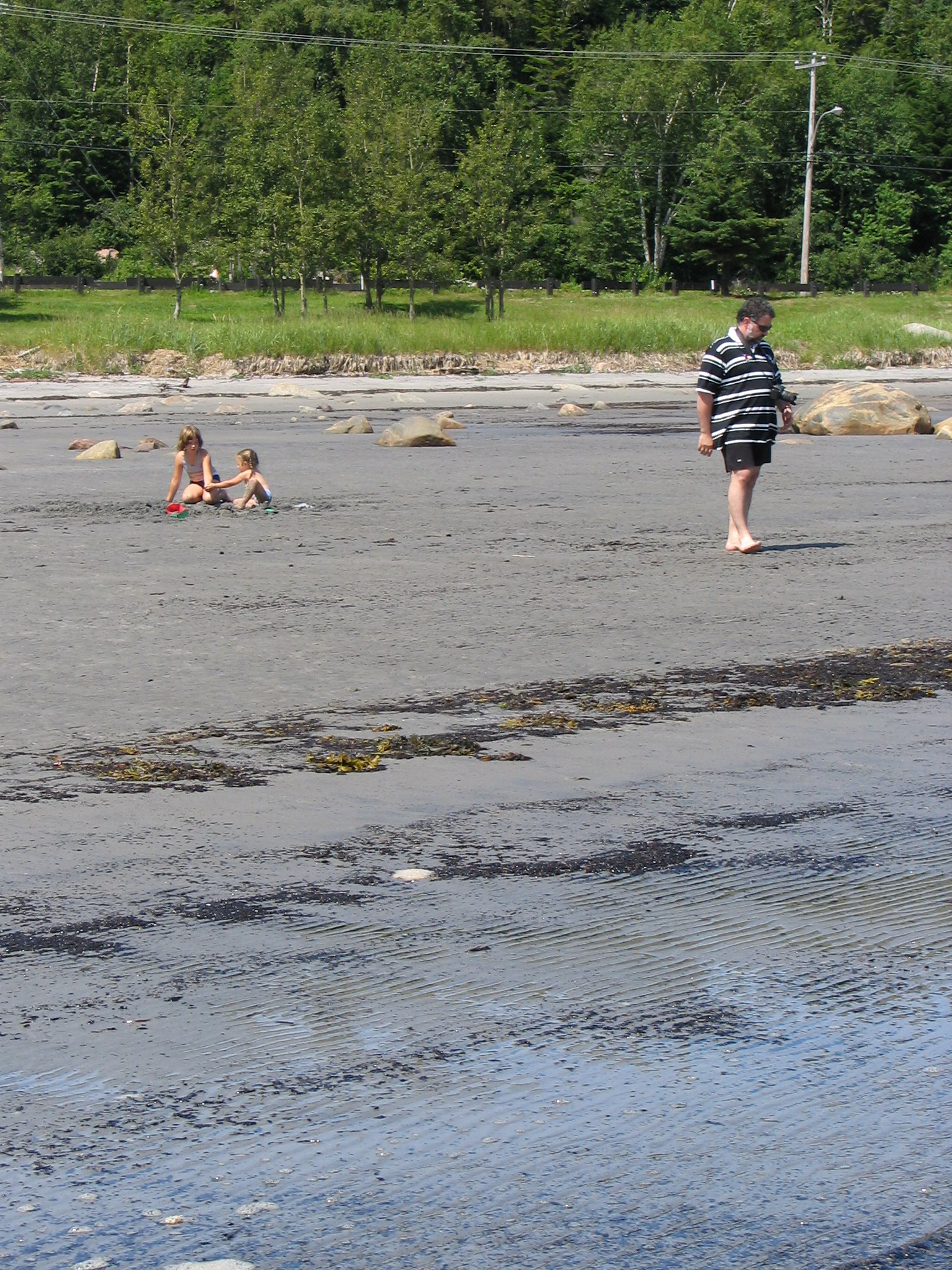
Route 138, beach, gulf of St Lawrence

== Demography ==
In the 2021 Census of Population conducted by Statistics Canada, Baie-Trinité had a population of 438 living in 231 of its 341 total private dwellings, a change of 7.6% from its 2016 population of 407. With a land area of 417.48 km^{2} (161.19 sq mi), it had a population density of 1.0/km^{2} (2.7/sq mi) in 2021.

Historical census populations – Baie-Trinité, Quebec

Year	Pop.	±%
1956	913	—
1961	968	+6.0%
1966	855	−11.7%
1971	734	−14.2%
1976	802	+9.3%
1981	749	−6.6%
1986	756	+0.9%

Year	Pop.	±%
1991	651	−13.9%
1996	646	−0.8%
2001	604	−6.5%
2006	526	−12.9%
2011	419	−20.3%
2016	407	−2.9%
2021	438	+7.6%

Population counts are not adjusted for boundary changes.
Source: Statistics Canada

Mother tongue (2021):

- English as first language: 1.1%
- French as first language: 94.3%
- English and French as first language: 0%
- Other as first language: 3.4%
