= Magpie Generating Station =

Hydroelectric power station in Quebec

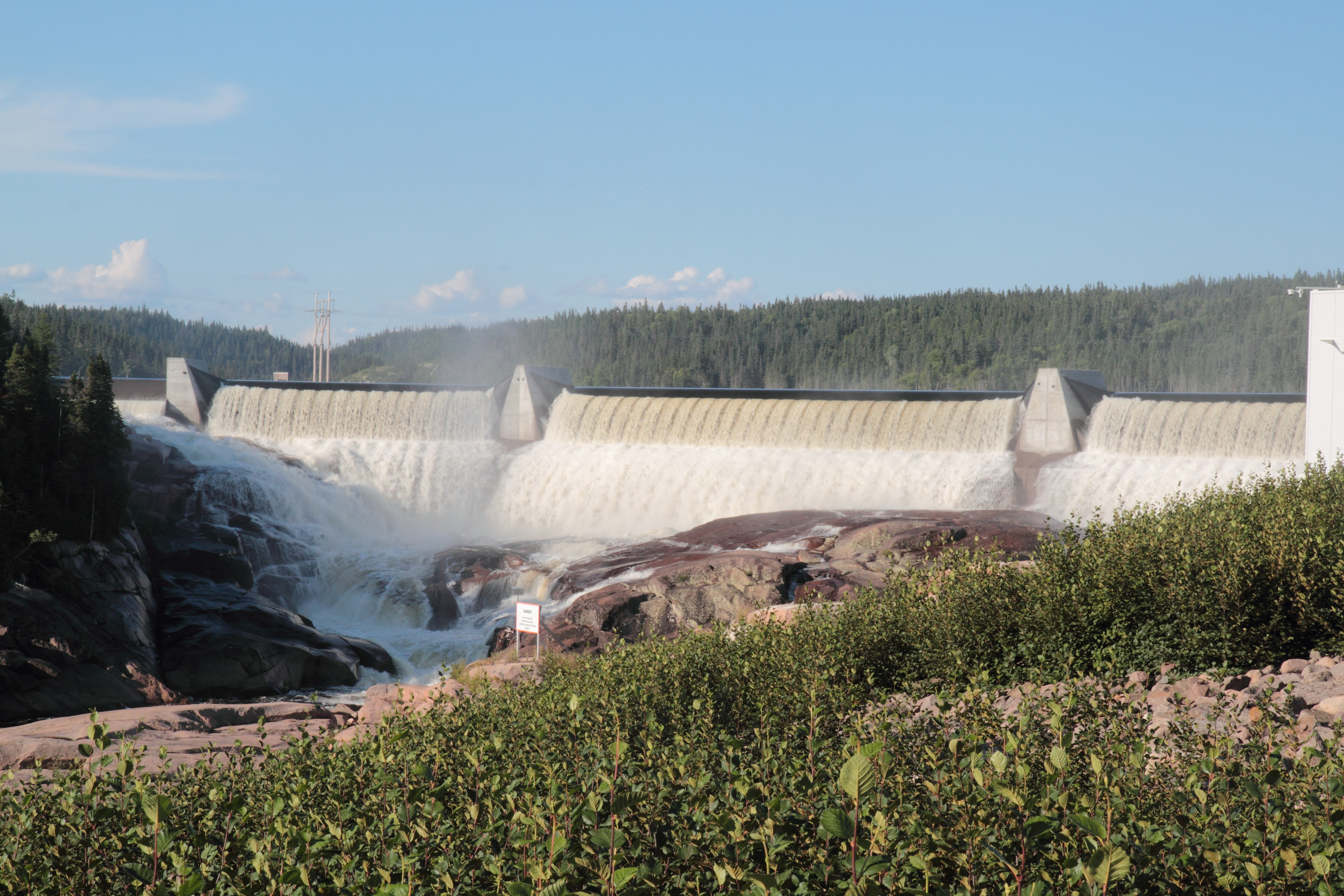
- Magpie dam

- Location within Quebec
- Official name: Centrale Magpie
- Country: Canada
- Location: Rivière-Saint-Jean, Minganie, Quebec
- Coordinates: 50.323611°N 64.45527°W
- Owner: Hydroméga Services inc

Power Station
- Coordinates: 50.322624°N 64.454306°W
- Commission date: October 2007
- Type: Run-of-the-river
- Installed capacity: 40.6 MW
- Annual generation: 185,000 MWh

The Magpie Generating Station (French: Centrale Magpie) is a 40.6 MW hydroelectric power generating station on the Magpie River in the Côte-Nord region of the province of Quebec, Canada. There was controversy during the planning phase since the dam flooded a stretch of rapids popular with advanced kayakers and rafters. However, the project was approved in 2005 and commissioned in 2007.

== Description ==
The Magpie Generating Station is 9 kilometres (5.6 mi) west of the village of Rivière-Saint-Jean in the Minganie Regional County Municipality. It is about 150 kilometres (93 mi) east of Sept-Îles. The dam site was an abandoned hydroelectric station at the point where the Magpie River is crossed by Quebec Route 138 near its mouth on the Saint Lawrence. The original 2 MW plant was built in 1958. The new, higher dam raises the river's water level for 1 mile (1.6 km) upstream of the dam.

The power station is a run-of-the-river plant with gross capacity of 40.6 MW. Average annual production is about 185,000 MWh. Next to the complex there is a visitors center, and a hiking trail and footbridge over one of the branches of the river. The interpretation pavilion, observatory and picnic area are on an island near the power station, and are designed to reflect the industrial architecture of the restored plant.

== Planning ==
Hydroméga was the first independent electricity producer in Quebec after the provincial government and Hydro-Québec established a small hydro policy in 1987. The new company's first project was to restore the abandoned Mont-Laurier generating station. This was followed by the Côte Sainte-Catherine power station and Sainte-Marguerite-1 station. In November 2002, Hydroméga was chosen by Hydro-Québec and the Quebec Ministry of Natural Resources to develop and operate a 40.6 MW hydroelectric power station at the mouth of the Magpie River. The terms included a 25-year commitment by Hydro-Québec to lease the hydraulic power and to buy the electricity.

The project involved raising the old dam by 9 metres (30 ft), which would flood the rapids just downstream of the second waterfall, the most popular with rafters and kayakers. On the other hand, creating a reservoir between the first and second falls would make the river upstream of the second fall more accessible to fishers, canoeists and kayakers. There was opposition from environmentalists, including Robert F. Kennedy Jr. of the Waterkeeper Alliance, who were concerned that the dam would be the first of many.

However, Hydromêga gained support from local mayors based on the jobs created by the construction project and direct payments to eight villages in the economically depressed region. The Bureau of Public Hearings on the Environment (BAPE) gave a favorable report on the project in 2004, but said there should be no further development on the river. In August 2005, the Charest government authorized construction of the dam by decree, which would eliminate the famous rapids.

== Development ==
Hydroméga partnered with the Minganie Regional County Municipality to build the CDN$75 million facility. In October 2006, the 42 MW power station was connected to the grid through the 161 kV Arnaud-Natashquan line. The Magpie Hydroelectric Power Station was commissioned in October 2007. It was formally inaugurated on 20 June 2008.

== Later events ==
In July 2013, Innergex of Longueuil paid $28.6 million and assumed debt of $55.4 million in exchange for Hydroméga's 70% stake in the power station. The Minganie RCM retained its 30% share. The plant was returning revenues of $10.6 million per year under the contract with Hydro-Québec Distribution. In its 2009–2013 strategic plan, Hydro-Québec was planning to build six hydroelectric dams on the 277 kilometres (172 mi) Magpie River. However, in September 2017 the company stated that it had surplus capacity and at present had no plans for the river.

== Sources ==
- Bordeleau, Jean-Louis (15 September 2017), Hydro-Québec ferme la porte à un barrage sur la rivière Magpie (in French), Radio-Canada
- Centrale Hydroelectrique Magpie (in French), Lacasse Experts-Conseils ltée
- Centrale Magpie (in French), Hydroméga
- Francoeur, Louis-Gilles (27 October 2004), "Le BAPE bénit le projet d'harnachement de la rivière Magpie", Le Devoir (in French)
- Francoeur, Louis-Gilles (25 August 2005), "Québec autorise la construction d'une centrale hydroélectrique sur la Magpie", Le Devoir (in French)
- Historique (in French), Hydroméga
- Magpie (in French), Innergex
- Magpie (in French), Tourisme Côte-Nord
- Séguin, Dominique (30 July 2013), "Centrale hydroélectrique : La Magpie a un nouvel acquéreur de Longueuil", Le Nord-Côtier (in French)
- Sundeen, Mark (May 2005), ""Viva la Magpie"", National Geographic Adventure
- Tableau des études d'impact pour les demandes de service de transport (T) et pour les raccordements ou les modifications de centrales (R) (in French), Hydro-Québec, archived from the original on 2008-11-20
