= Lake Davy Old Forest =

Canadian nature reserve

- Forêt ancienne du Lac Davy
- IUCN category III (natural monument or feature)
- Location within Quebec
- Location: Aguanish, Minganie RCM, Côte-Nord, Quebec, Canada
- Nearest city: Havre-Saint-Pierre
- Coordinates: 50.973415°N 62.774189°W
- Area: 403 ha (1,000 acres)
- Designation: Old-growth forest
- Designated: 2009
- Governing body: Quebec Ministère des Ressources naturelles, de la Faune et des Parcs

The Lake Davy Old Forest (French: Forêt ancienne du Lac Davy) is a protected area of old-growth forest in the Côte-Nord region of Quebec, Canada. It is classified as an exceptional forest ecosystem.

== Location ==
The Lake Davy is in the unorganized territory of Aguanish in Minganie Regional County Municipality of the Côte-Nord region. Lake Davy Old Forest extends around the northeast of the lake. The forest is located on a moderate slope covered with undifferentiated glacial till with good drainage, and covers 403 hectares (1,000 acres). It is 124 kilometres (77 mi) northeast of Havre-Saint-Pierre. The forest is in the watershed of the Watshishou River.

The forest is administered by Quebecʻs Ministry of Natural Resources, Wildlife and Parks, Forest Environment Directorate. It was designated old-growth forest in 2009, and has IUCN management category III. A map of the ecological regions of Quebec shows the Nabisipi River Old Forest in the east spruce/moss subdomain.

== Flora ==
The Lake Davy Old Forest has not been affected by major natural disturbances such as fires, wind storms or insect infestations for over 200 years, and has not been logged or otherwise disturbed by human activities. Some of the trees are very old or senescent, including trees up to 240 years of age. However, the trees are relatively small due to the poor soil and harsh climate. Balsam fir (Abies balsamea) dominates the forest, which is typical of the late succession stage of coniferous forests. There are many stumps and much wood debris on the ground, often at advanced stages of decomposition. The forest is renewed in small gaps that are formed when individual trees die or small groups are felled by the wind.

The climate favors black spruce (Picea mariana) and balsam fir, with the more spruce in the flatter areas and more fir on the better drained slopes. There is hardly any paper birch (Betula papyrifera), which indicates the low level of windthrow disturbances. The flora are not diverse. The undergrowth has fir, spruce and also shadbush (Amelanchier ) and withe-rod (Viburnum nudum). Red-stemmed feathermoss (Pleurozium schreberi|) carpets the ground, in which Canadian bunchberry (Cornus canadensis) and threeleaf goldthread (Coptis trifolia)are sometimes found.

== Sources ==
- Bourdon, Philippe; Ibrahim, Ghassen; Luce, Myriam; NantobBikatui, N’Binkéna; Othoniel, Clara; Tremblay, Yohann (April 2015), Portrait préliminaire de la zone de gestion intégrée de l'eau par bassin versant (PDF) (in French), OBV Duplessis, archived from the original (PDF) on 2019-09-02
- Forêt ancienne du Lac Davy (PDF) (in French), Ministère des Ressources naturelles, de la Faune et des Parcs
- Forêt ancienne du Lac Davy in Canada, Protected Planet
- Lac Davy, Natural Resources Canada
- Saucier, J.-P.; Robitaille, A.; Grondin, P.; Bergeron, J.-F.; Gosselin, J. (2011), Les régions écologiques du Québec méridional (PDF) (map), 4 (in French), Ministère des Ressources naturelles et de la Faune, archived from the original (PDF) on 2020-06-19
