= Magpie River (Quebec) =

Coordinates: 50°19′11″N 64°27′32″W

Magpie River Moteskikan Hipu, Mutehekau Hipu, Mutehekau Shipu, Pmotewsekaw Sipo, Rivière Magpie
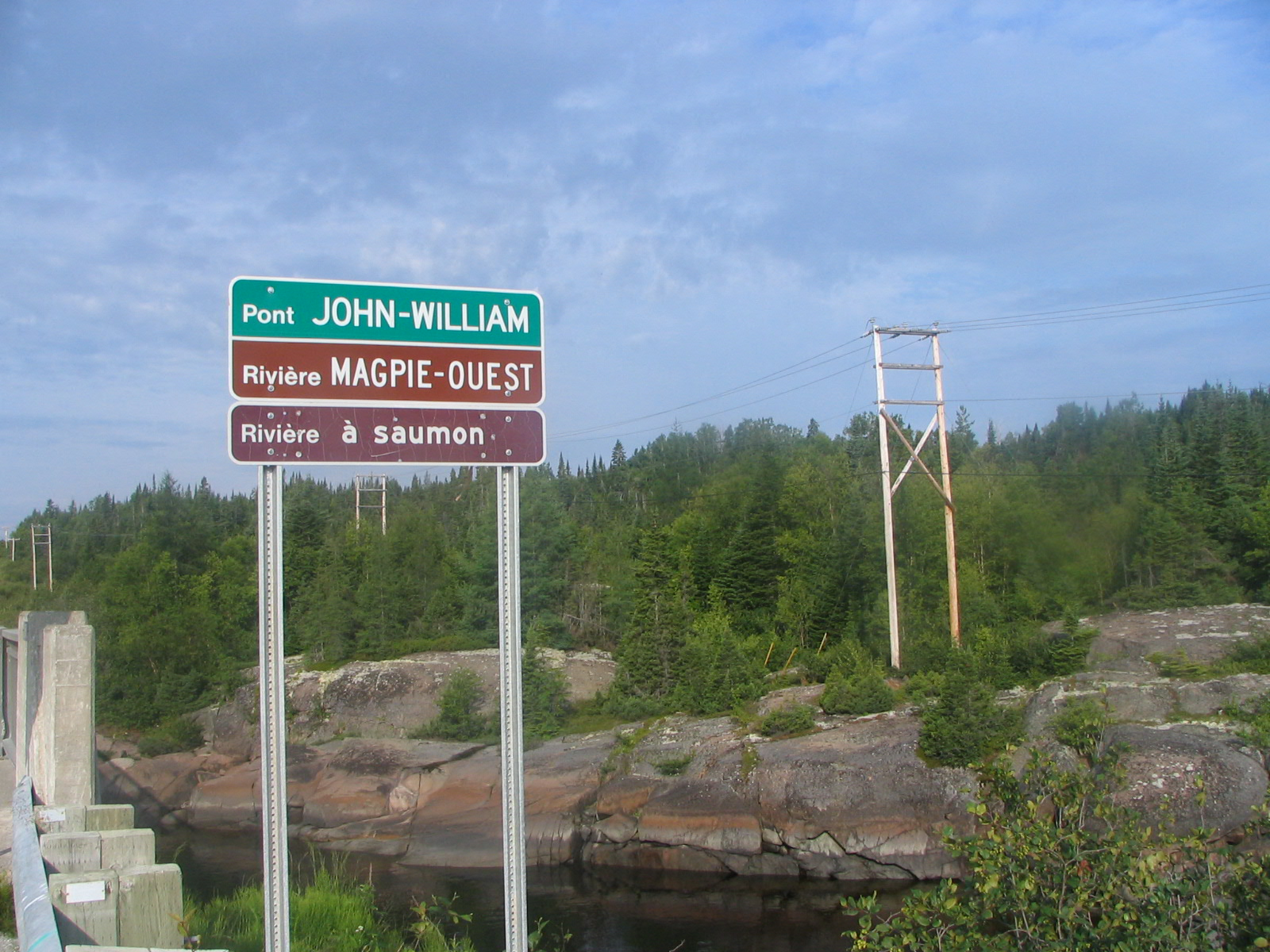
- On Quebec Route 138, from John-William Bridge (steel beams 02519W)

- Location within Quebec
- Native name: Mutehekau Hipu (Innu)

Location
- Country: Canada
- Province: Quebec
- Region: Côte-Nord
- RCM: Minganie, Sept-Rivières

Physical characteristics
- Mouth: Gulf of St. Lawrence
  - coordinates
  - elevation: 0 metres (0 ft)
- Length: 200 kilometres (120 mi)
- Basin size: 7,646 square kilometres (2,952 sq mi)

The Magpie River (Rivière Magpie in French) flows from north to south, emptying into Magpie Bay, Gulf of St. Lawrence, in Rivière-Saint-Jean municipality, Minganie RCM, Côte-Nord, Quebec, Canada.

== Geography ==
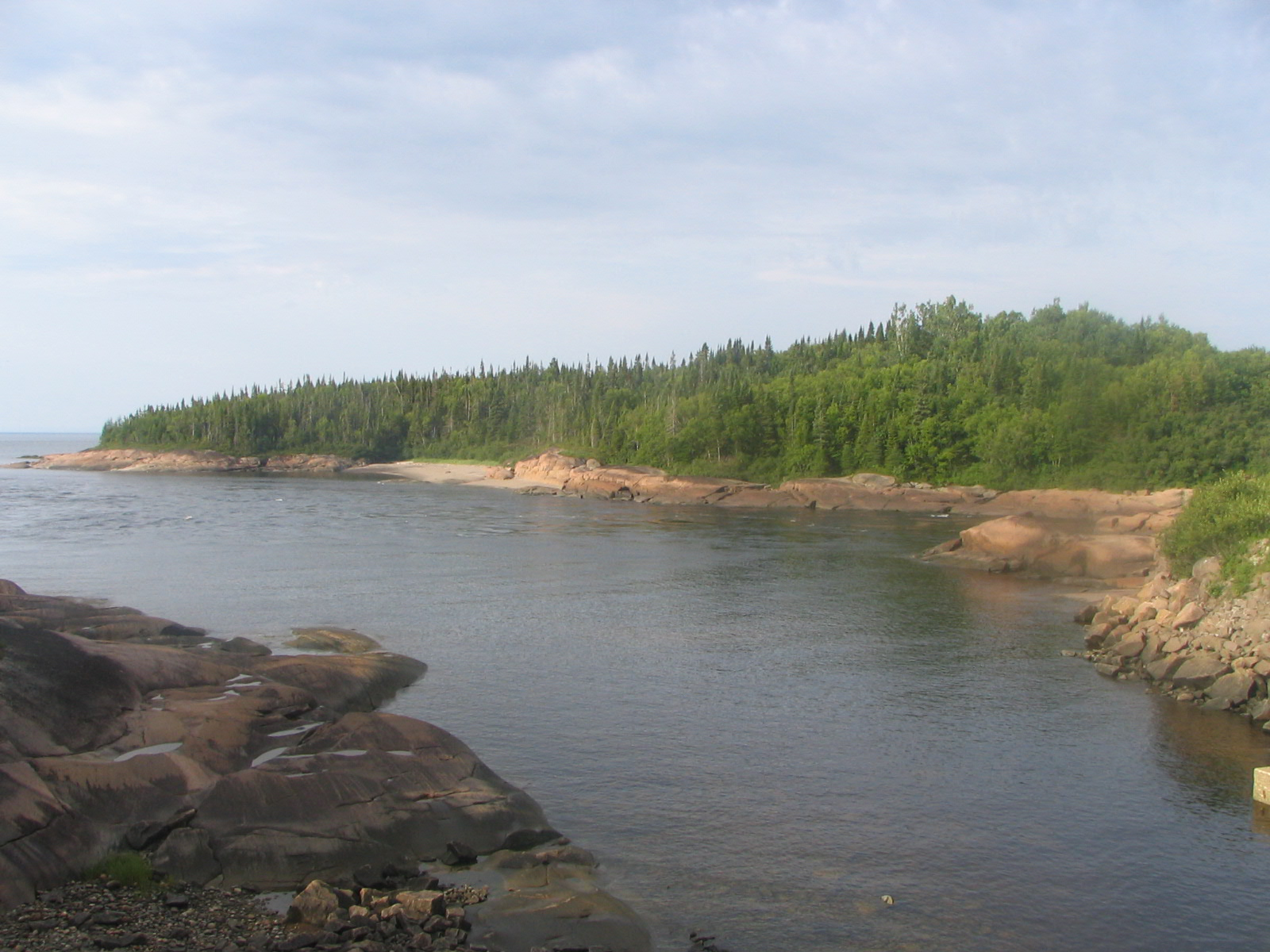
Salmon river, from John-William-Girard Bridge (steel beam 02519E), Quebec Route 138, Rivière-Saint-Jean municipality

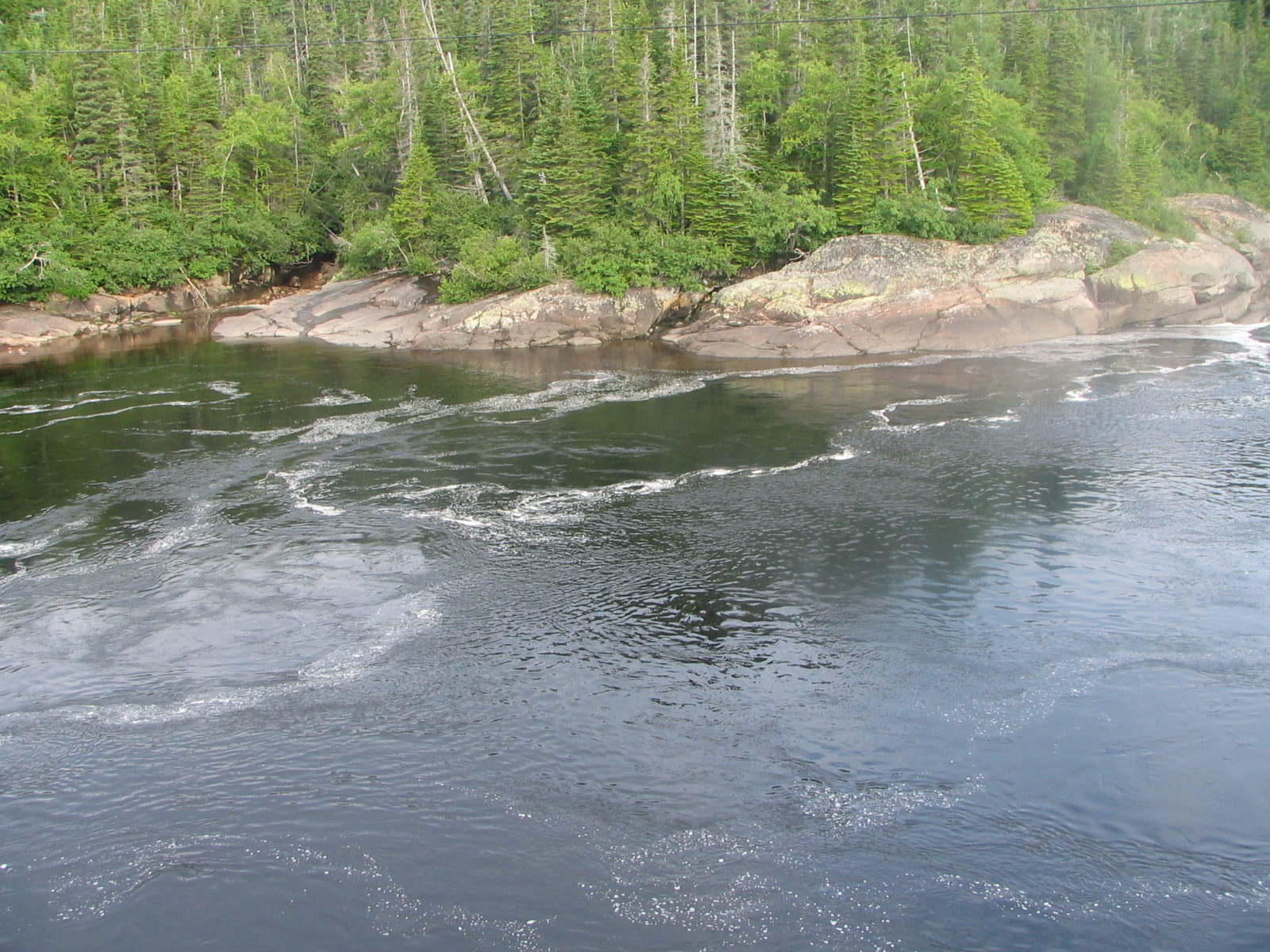
From Girard Bridge, Rivière-Saint-Jean municipality

The Magpie River covers a distance of 290 kilometres (180 mi) from north to south with a height difference of 610 m, its watershed covers an area of 7650 km^{2}. The river is not wide, but fast and turbulent.

It rises near the border between Quebec and Labrador, flows south, and enters Magpie Bay 60 kilometres (37 mi) west of Havre-Saint-Pierre. Two of its tributaries are named Magpie West and Magpie East. The central section contains the long Lake Magpie.

Its estuary is wide and forms a harbour for fishing boats. The village of Magpie is on the hillside around another small harbor on Magpie Bay 3 kilometres (1.9 mi) west of the river mouth, and is one of the oldest towns on the Côte-Nord. The site was visited from 1849 by Gaspesians from Chaleur Bay who came to fish for cod and Atlantic salmon. The village boomed after the fishing companies Robin & Colas and Le Bouthillier established facilities there around 1870.

== Name ==
The river is named for the Canada jay (Perisoreus canadensis), which the English called "magpie". In the 19th century the local people pronounced it Magpointe. In 1870 Eugène-Étienne Taché's map showed the river as "R. Magpie or La Pie". In 1886 the surveyor Saint-Cyr called it Rivière à la Pie. It is nicknamed La Pie. According to the Abbé Victor-Alphonse Huard, it was also called Girard River after the three Girard brothers who settled in the area around 1849. The Innu have called it by various names, including Moteskikan Hipu, meaning "abrupt", "rocky", or "difficult" river, Mutehekau Hipu which translates as "river where the water passes between the square rocky cliffs", and Pmotewsekaw Sipo which means "river along which one walks among the shrubs".

== Description ==
According to the Dictionnaire des rivières et lacs de la province de Québec (1914)

the north coast of the Gulf of St. Lawrence, Saguenay County, at 380 miles from Quebec and six miles east of Ouapitagon. This watercourse is quite difficult to navigate, since it is broken by a series of falls and rapids from its mouth to a distance of about thirty four miles upstream. At this distance there is a very deep lake, 53 miles long. At 8 miles from the mouth there is a stand of spruce of good size and quality. There is excellent hydraulic power and a good harbour at the mouth. The Magpie has a great reputation for salmon and trout fishing. The Robin house has a post on the banks of this river, a major cod fishing establishment.

== Basin ==
The Magpie River basin covers 7,646 square kilometres (2,952 sq mi). It lies between the basins of the Jupitagon River to the west and the Saint-Jean River to the east. It is partly in the unorganized territories of Lac-Jérôme and Rivière-Nipissis, partly in the municipality of Rivière-Saint-Jean. According to the Dictionnaire des rivières et lacs de la province de Québec (1914), Lake Magpie is 34 miles (55 km) from the mouth of the Magpie River. It is about 53 miles (85 km) long and very deep. It is bordered on each side by capes and mountains. It is full of large pike. A map of the ecological regions of Quebec shows the river in sub-regions 6j-T and 6m-T of the east spruce/moss subdomain.

== Hydroelectric production ==
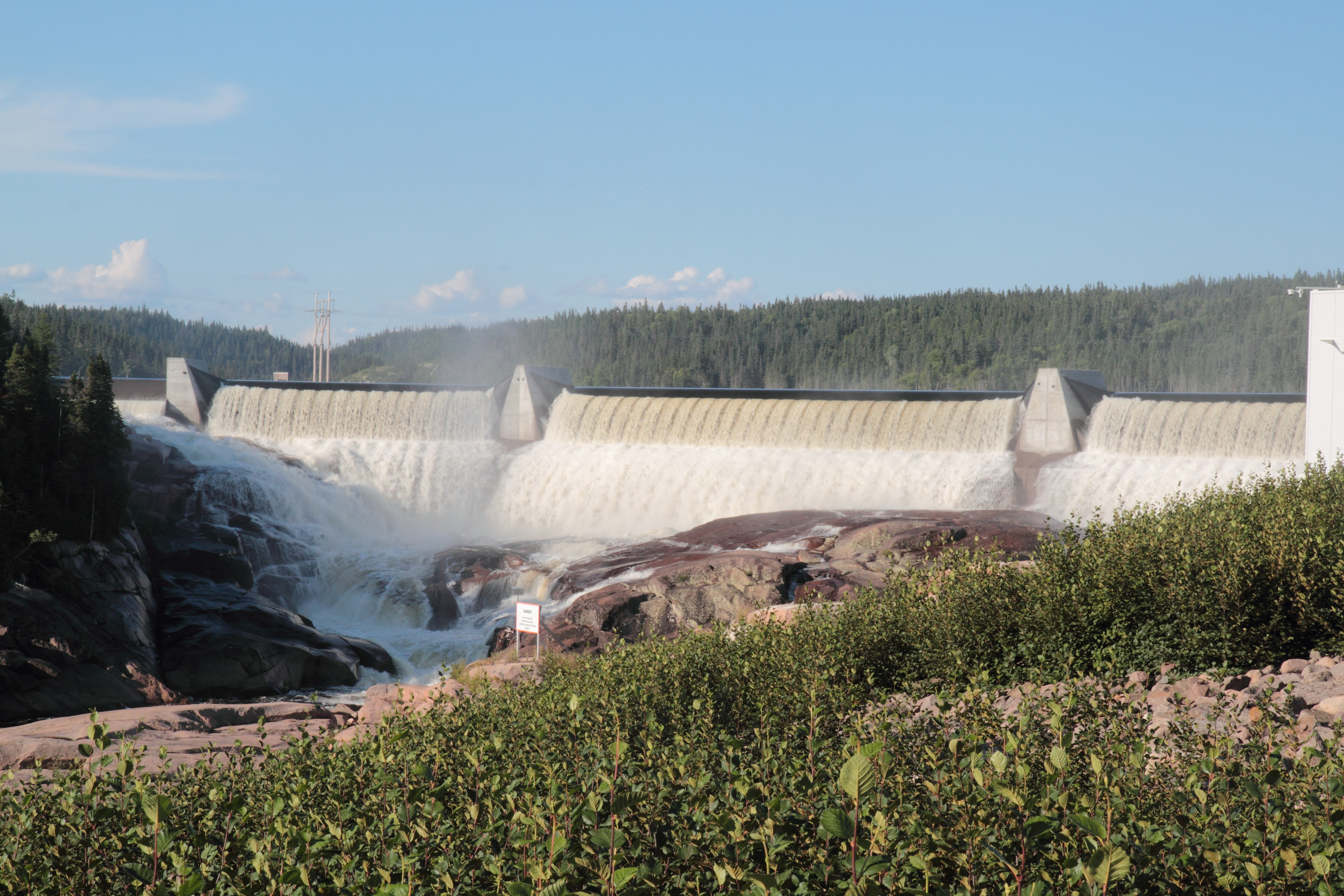
Magpie Dam

In 2004, a plan by a private company to construct a small hydroelectric plant on the river generated protests by environmentalists. The Bureau of Public Hearings on the Environment (BAPE) gave a favorable report on the project in 2004, but said there should be no further development on the river. In August 2005 the Charest government authorized construction of the dam by decree, which would eliminate some famous rapids. The Magpie Generating Station was commissioned in October 2007 and formally inaugurated on 20 June 2008. In its 2009–2013 strategic plan, Hydro-Québec was planning to build six hydroelectric dams on the Magpie. In September 2017, it reported surplus capacity and no plans for the river. In 2013, Hydro-Quebec sold the existing generating station to Innergex Renewable Energy, which owns it in partnership with the Minganie municipality.

Since 2008 the Magpie Generating Station has been generating electricity. In 2021, the municipality of Minganie and the Innu Council of Ekuanitshit granted the Magpie River legal personhood and longterm protection from energy producers like Hydro-Quebec and Innergex Renewable Energy.

== Recreational use ==
In May 2015 the Ministry of Forests, Wildlife and Parks of Quebec announced a sport fishing catch-and-release program for large salmon on sixteen of Quebec's 118 salmon rivers. These were the Mitis, Laval, Pigou, Bouleau, aux Rochers, Jupitagon, Magpie, Saint-Jean, Corneille, Piashti, Watshishou, Little Watshishou, Nabisipi, Aguanish, and Natashquan rivers. The Quebec Atlantic Salmon Federation said that the measures did not go nearly far enough in protecting salmon for future generations. In view of the rapidly declining Atlantic salmon population catch-and-release should have been implemented on all rivers apart from northern Quebec.

The river is popular with white-water rafting, canoeing and kayaking enthusiasts. The lower section of the West Magpie provides 50 kilometres (31 mi) of challenging conditions for class IV–V whitewater kayak and open-boat paddlers. It flows into Lake Magpie 50 kilometres (31 mi) north of where the Magpie leaves the lake. From there the river can be handled by most recreational kayakers. The first 15 kilometres (9.3 mi) below the lake has exceptional fishing. The last 15 kilometres (9.3 mi) of the river flows through huge scenic gorges and over waterfalls.

== Legal personhood ==
In February 2021, the Magpie River became the first river in Canada to be granted legal personhood, after the local municipality of Minganie and the Innu Council of Ekuanitshit passed joint resolutions. The goal is long-term protection, as energy producers Hydro-Quebec and Innergex Renewable Energy have not ruled out development in the future, as proponents of legal personhood wanted to prevent a development like at Romaine River. The river has nine distinct rights and can have legal guardians.
