= Uhackatik =

Terrestrial crater

Uhackatik Crater
- Location within Quebec
- Location: Quebec, Canada; 51°12′00″N 64°42′00″W

Impact crater structure
- Diameter: 25 km (16 mi)
- Age: Devonian (~390 Ma)

Uhackatik Crater is an impact crater in Quebec, Canada, near the border with Labrador. The crater is about 25 kilometres (16 mi) in diameter. The crater contains sheets of melt rock up to 50 metres (160 ft) thick. The impact is dated to have occurred during the Devonian geological period, about 390 million years ago, based on paleomagnetic analysis and uranium-lead dating. Lake Marsal lies near the center of the crater, while the northern part of Lake Magpie lies on its western edge.

The crater was tentatively identified by an amateur astronomer who was using Google Earth satellite imagery to help plan a camping trip in the area. Researchers visited the site in October 2025 to collect samples. The results of this expedition confirmed that the crater is the result of an impact event. Researchers conferred with the local Ekuanitshit Innu people in deciding on the name Uhackatik.

== See also ==
- List of impact craters on Earth
