= Nabisipi River Old Forest =

Protected area in Quebec, Canada

- Forêt ancienne de la Rivière-Nabisipi
- IUCN category III (natural monument or feature)
- Location within Quebec
- Nearest city: Havre-Saint-Pierre
- Coordinates: 50.842°N 62.499°W
- Area: 240 ha (590 acres)
- Designation: Old-growth forest
- Designated: 2008
- Governing body: Quebec Ministère des Ressources naturelles, de la Faune et des Parcs

The Nabisipi River Old Forest (French: Forêt ancienne de la Rivière-Nabisipi) is a protected area of old-growth forest in the Côte-Nord region of Quebec, Canada. It is classified as an exceptional forest ecosystem.

== Location ==
The Nabisipi River Old Forest is in the unorganized territory of Aguanish in Minganie Regional County Municipality of the Côte-Nord region. It is 100 kilometres (60 mi) northeast of Havre-Saint-Pierre. It is to the northeast of Lake Watshishou. It is in the watershed of the Watshishou River. It is to the west of the Nabisipi River, from which it takes its name. The ground is covered mainly by undifferentiated glacial till of variable depth.

The forest is administered by Quebecʻs Ministry of Natural Resources, Wildlife and Parks, Forest Environment Directorate. It was designated old-growth forest in 2005, and has IUCN management category III. A map of the ecological regions of Quebec shows the Nabisipi River Old Forest in the east spruce/moss subdomain.

== Flora ==
The Nabisipi River Old Forest contains balsam fir (Abies balsamea) trees 200 years old, a remarkable age for this species, and black spruce (Picea mariana) trees up to 270 years old. It has not been seriously affected by natural disturbances such as fire, wind storms or outbreaks of insects, and avoided the hemlock looper (Lambdina fiscellaria) outbreak in the Côte-Nord region in 1998–2001. It has also not been disturbed by forestry or other human activities.

The wet climate has helped produce a long cycle of more than 500 years between fires. This has allowed massive stands of balsam fir to become established and to grow to their high proportion of the forest trees. The mature old-growth forest includes very old, senescent trees and the greatly decomposed debris of tree trunks as large as any now living. Renewal occurs when small gaps are created by the fall of isolated trees or small groups of trees. The spruce and fir are roughly equal in numbers, and there are also some white spruce (Picea glauca) and paper birch (Betula papyrifera).

The understory and regenerating areas contain the same trees as the canopy, as well as shadbush (Amelanchier) and alder (Alnus incana). Herbaceous cover is thin but very diverse, with the most common species being Canadian bunchberry (Cornus canadensis), creeping snowberry (Gaultheria hispidula) and mountain woodsorrel (Oxalis montana). Mosses cover much of the ground, particularly red-stemmed feathermoss (Pleurozium schreberi), knights plume moss (Ptilium crista-castrensis) and glittering woodmoss (Hylocomium splendens). Sphagnum covers the remaining space.

== Sources ==
- Bourdon, Philippe; Ibrahim, Ghassen; Luce, Myriam; NantobBikatui, N’Binkéna; Othoniel, Clara; Tremblay, Yohann (April 2015), Portrait préliminaire de la zone de gestion intégrée de l'eau par bassin versant (PDF) (in French), OBV Duplessis, archived from the original (PDF) on 2019-09-02
- Forêt ancienne de la Rivière-Nabisipi (PDF) (in French), Ministère des Ressources naturelles, de la Faune et des Parcs
- Forêt ancienne de la Rivière-Nabisipi, Natural Resources Canada
- Forêt ancienne de la Rivière-Nabisipi in Canada, Protected Planet
- Saucier, J.-P.; Robitaille, A.; Grondin, P.; Bergeron, J.-F.; Gosselin, J. (2011), Les régions écologiques du Québec méridional (PDF) (map), 4 (in French), Ministère des Ressources naturelles et de la Faune, archived from the original (PDF) on 2020-06-19
