= Little Watshishou River =

- Location within Quebec
- Native name: Petite rivière Watshishou (French)

Location
- Country: Canada
- Province: Quebec
- Region: Côte-Nord
- RCM: Minganie

Physical characteristics
- Source: Lac Gallienne
  - coordinates: 50.6841667°N 62.3616667°W
- Mouth: Gulf of Saint Lawrence
  - location: Baie-Johan-Beetz, Minganie
  - coordinates: 50.2719444°N 62.6316667°W
- Length: 70 kilometres (43 mi)
- Basin size: 413 square kilometres (159 sq mi)

The Little Watshishou River (French: Petite rivière Watshishou) is a salmon river in the east of the Côte-Nord region of Quebec, Canada.

== Location ==
The Little Watshishou River originates in Lake Gallienne, and flows southwest to enter the Gulf of Saint Lawrence 14 kilometres (8.7 mi) from the village of Baie-Johan-Beetz. The river flows through the unorganized territory of Lac-Jérôme in Minganie Regional County Municipality. Lower down it flows through the municipality of Aguanish. The mouth of the river is in the municipality of Baie-Johan-Beetz, Minganie. Quebec Route 138 crosses the river near its mouth.

The river is about 70 kilometres (43 mi) long. It drains a watershed of 413 square kilometres (159 sq mi). It lies between the basins of the Watshishou River to the west and the Pashashibou River to the east. The watershed contains the Forêt ancienne du Lac-Auger. The river roughly defines the boundary between the lower boreal biological zone to the north and the hemiarctic zone to the south. The river has moderate hydroelectric potential in its northern section.

== Name ==
The toponym Watshishou is also used for the nearby Watshishou River. It is probably the same as the "R. Oueachechou" on Boishébert's 1715 map, and Oydchechou on Bellin's 1744 map. Later maps spell it Watcheeshoo, Watsheeshou, Watscheeshoo, Watsjishu and Watchichou. The Dictionary of Rivers and Lakes of the Province of Quebec (1914 and 1925) gives it as Watshishou. In the Innu language it means "white mountain" or "bright mountain". It probably refers to the landmark polished granite Watshishou Hill, 45 metres (148 ft) high to the east of the mouth of the Watshishou River. Others say the word comes from watsh (mountain) and shu (small), meaning small mountain.

== Fishing ==
Joseph Tanguay, originally from Berthier, settled at the Little Watshishou River in 1854. Tanguay and his sons fished mostly for salmon on the Corneille, Petite Watshishou, Watshishou and Quetachou rivers. In 1862 Tanguay moved to Baie Piashti, which was renamed Baie Johan-Beetz in 1925. Today the Baie-Johan-Beetz Outfitter supports fishing on the river, including for Atlantic salmon and landlocked salmon. There are seven fishing holes on the stream, which can be fished with waders or from a boat from mid-June to the end of August. The outfitter provides three chalets on the river between the highway and the Gulf. The Pourvoirie du Lac Holt also supports fishing on the river.

The Little Watshishou River has icy, often tumultuous waters, with beautiful rapids and waterfalls. Fish species include Atlantic salmon (Salmo salar), brook trout (Salvelinus fontinalis), American eel (Anguilla rostrata) and ninespine stickleback (Pungitius pungitius). Atlantic salmon use the last 21 kilometres (13 mi) of the river, up to a waterfall that blocks their way. A 2018 North Atlantic Salmon Conservation Organization (NASCO) Rivers Database Report gave the status of the river as "Not Threatened With Loss".

In May 2015 the Ministry of Forests, Wildlife and Parks of Quebec announced a sport fishing catch-and-release program for large salmon on sixteen of Quebec's 118 salmon rivers. These were the Mitis, Laval, Pigou, Bouleau, aux Rochers, Jupitagon, Magpie, Saint-Jean, Corneille, Piashti, Watshishou, Little Watshishou, Nabisipi, Aguanish and Natashquan rivers. The Quebec Atlantic Salmon Federation said that the measures did not go nearly far enough in protecting salmon for future generations. In view of the rapidly declining Atlantic salmon population catch-and-release should have been implemented on all rivers apart from northern Quebec.

== Sources ==
- Bourdon, Philippe; Ibrahim, Ghassen; Luce, Myriam; NantobBikatui, N’Binkéna; Othoniel, Clara; Tremblay, Yohann (April 2015), Portrait préliminaire de la zone de gestion intégrée de l’eau par bassin versant (PDF) (in French), OBV Duplessis
- Dumont, Jean (June 1986), Prolongement de la route 138 entre Baie Johan-Beetz et la Rivière Pashashibou (PDF) (in French)
- NASCO Rivers Database Report (PDF), NASCO, 17 January 2018
- Petite rivière Watshishou, Natural Resources Canada
- Petite rivière Watshishou (in French), Saumon Québec
- Portrait préliminaire de la zone de gestion intégrée de l'eau par bassin versant Duplessis (PDF) (in French), OBV Duplessis, April 2015
- Quebec salmon need stronger preservation rules, association says, Montreal: CBC News, 10 May 2015
- "Rivières de la Côte-Nord", GrandQuebec.com (in French)
- Secteur Petite Rivière Watshishou (PDF) (in French), Federation des Pouvoiries du Quebec, February 2007
