= Lake Auger Old Forest =

- Forêt ancienne du Lac Auger
- IUCN category III (natural monument or feature)
- Location within Quebec
- Nearest city: Havre-Saint-Pierre
- Coordinates: 50.582778°N 62.399167°W
- Area: 296 ha (730 acres)
- Designation: Old-growth forest
- Designated: 2005
- Governing body: Quebec Ministère des Ressources naturelles, de la Faune et des Parcs

The Lake Auger Old Forest (French: Forêt ancienne du Lac-Auger) is a protected area of old-growth forest in the Côte-Nord region of Quebec, Canada. It is classified as an exceptional forest ecosystem.

== Location ==
The Lake Auger Old Forest Old Forest is in the unorganized territory of Lac-Jérôme in Minganie Regional County Municipality of the Côte-Nord region. It lies to the west of Lake Auger. It is in the watershed of the Little Watshishou River. The forest covers a rugged area of 296 hectares (730 acres), and is 95 kilometres (59 mi) northwest of Havre-Saint-Pierre.

The forest is administered by Quebecʻs Ministry of Natural Resources, Wildlife and Parks, Forest Environment Directorate. It was designated old-growth forest in 2005, and has IUCN management category III. A map of the ecological regions of Quebec shows the Lac Auger Old Forest in the east spruce/moss subdomain.

== Flora ==
The Lac-Auger Old Forest mainly consists of stands of black spruce (Picea mariana) and balsam fir (Abies balsamea), or stands of black spruce alone, over 200 years old. The oldest trees are about 285 years old. The forest has not been seriously affected by fire, insect infestations or windstorms, and has never been modified by human activities. It has developed naturally, and has trees of varied ages from saplings to mature and senescent trees of great age, with much wood litter including the fallen trunks of large trees. The natural renewal process probably predates the oldest trees in the forest. Although old, the trees are relatively small due to the harsh climate, with few larger than 34 centimetres (13 in) in diameter or 20 metres (66 ft) in height.

The forest grows on medium or steep slopes covered with thin glacial till. There is also black spruce in sphagnum moss in damp areas, and white spruce (Picea glauca) on the richest sites, often at the foot of slopes along the many streams that criss-cross the area. There are some white birch (Betula papyrifera) in openings in the forest caused by windstorms. Fir and black spruce also dominate the undergrowth. The other undergrowth plants are not very diversified, and include hypnaceous mosses and common broad leaf plants such as Canadian bunchberry (Cornus canadensis), blue-bead lily (Clintonia borealis) and creeping snowberry (Gaultheria hispidula).

== Sources ==
- Bourdon, Philippe; Ibrahim, Ghassen; Luce, Myriam; NantobBikatui, N’Binkéna; Othoniel, Clara; Tremblay, Yohann (April 2015), Portrait préliminaire de la zone de gestion intégrée de l'eau par bassin versant (PDF) (in French), OBV Duplessis, archived from the original (PDF) on 2019-09-02
- Forêt ancienne du Lac-Auger (PDF) (in French), Ministère des Ressources naturelles, de la Faune et des Parcs
- Forêt ancienne du Lac-Auger, Natural Resources Canada
- Forêt ancienne du Lac-Auger in Canada, Protected Planet
- Saucier, J.-P.; Robitaille, A.; Grondin, P.; Bergeron, J.-F.; Gosselin, J. (2011), Les régions écologiques du Québec méridional (PDF) (map), 4 (in French), Ministère des Ressources naturelles et de la Faune, archived from the original (PDF) on 2020-06-19
