= Lake Magpie =

Lake in Quebec, Canada

- Lac Magpie
- Location within Quebec
- Location: Lac-Jérôme, Minganie, Quebec
- Coordinates: 50.9936111°N 64.6822222°W
- Primary inflows: Magpie River
- Primary outflows: Magpie River
- Catchment area: 7,201 square kilometres (2,780 sq mi)
- Basin countries: Canada
- Max. length: 80 kilometres (50 mi)

Lake Magpie (French: Lac Magpie) is a lake in the Côte-Nord region of the province of Quebec, Canada. It forms the middle part of the Magpie River.

== Location ==
Lake Magpie is in the unorganized territory of Lac-Jérôme in the Minganie Regional County Municipality. It can only be reached by float plane. A map of the ecological regions of Quebec shows the lake in sub-region 6j-S of the east spruce/moss subdomain. The lake is named for the Canada jay (Perisoreus canadensis), a bird closely related to the magpie.

== Description ==
The lake is about 80 kilometres (50 mi) long. It is large, narrow and very deep, and is fed from the east and west by several streams. The West Magpie River flows into the lake 50 kilometres (31 mi) above the south end. The catchment area is 7,201 square kilometres (2,780 sq mi). Average discharge from the lake varies from about 40 cubic metres per second (1,400 cu ft/s) in March to about 1,000 cubic metres per second (35,000 cu ft/s) in early June.

According to the Dictionnaire des rivières et lacs de la province de Québec (1914), Lake Magpie is 34 miles (55 km) from the mouth of the Magpie River. It is about 53 miles (85 km) long, very deep and full of large pike. It is bordered on each side by capes and mountains. The northern part of Lake Magpie lies in a 390-million-year-old impact crater named Uhackatik.

The lake and surrounding area have been protected against logging, mining or hydroelectric projects since 19 June 2003, with plans to make it a biodiversity reserve. Fish include lake trout, landlocked salmon and northern pike. Hunters may shoot black bear and moose.

== Sources ==
- Débit à la station à la décharge du lac Magpie, Ministère de l’Environnement et de la Lutte contre les changements climatiques
- "DIY Magpie – A guide to unguided expeditions for paddlers", Boreal River Adventures
- Lac Magpie (in French), Commission de toponymie du Québec
- Lac Magpie (in French), Ressources naturelles Canada
- Pourvoirie du Lac Magpie, Quebec Outfitters Federation
- Rouillard, Eugène (1914), "Magpie, (Lac)", Dictionnaire des rivières et lacs de la province de Québec (in French), Québec. Département des terres et forêts
- Saucier, J.-P.; Robitaille, A.; Grondin, P.; Bergeron, J.-F.; Gosselin, J. (2011), Les régions écologiques du Québec méridional (PDF) (map), 4 (in French), Ministère des Ressources naturelles et de la Faune, archived from the original (PDF) on 2020-06-19
- Witt, Greg (1 October 2008), Rough Guide Ultimate Adventures, Rough Guides, ISBN 978-1-4053-8465-0
