= Watshishou River =

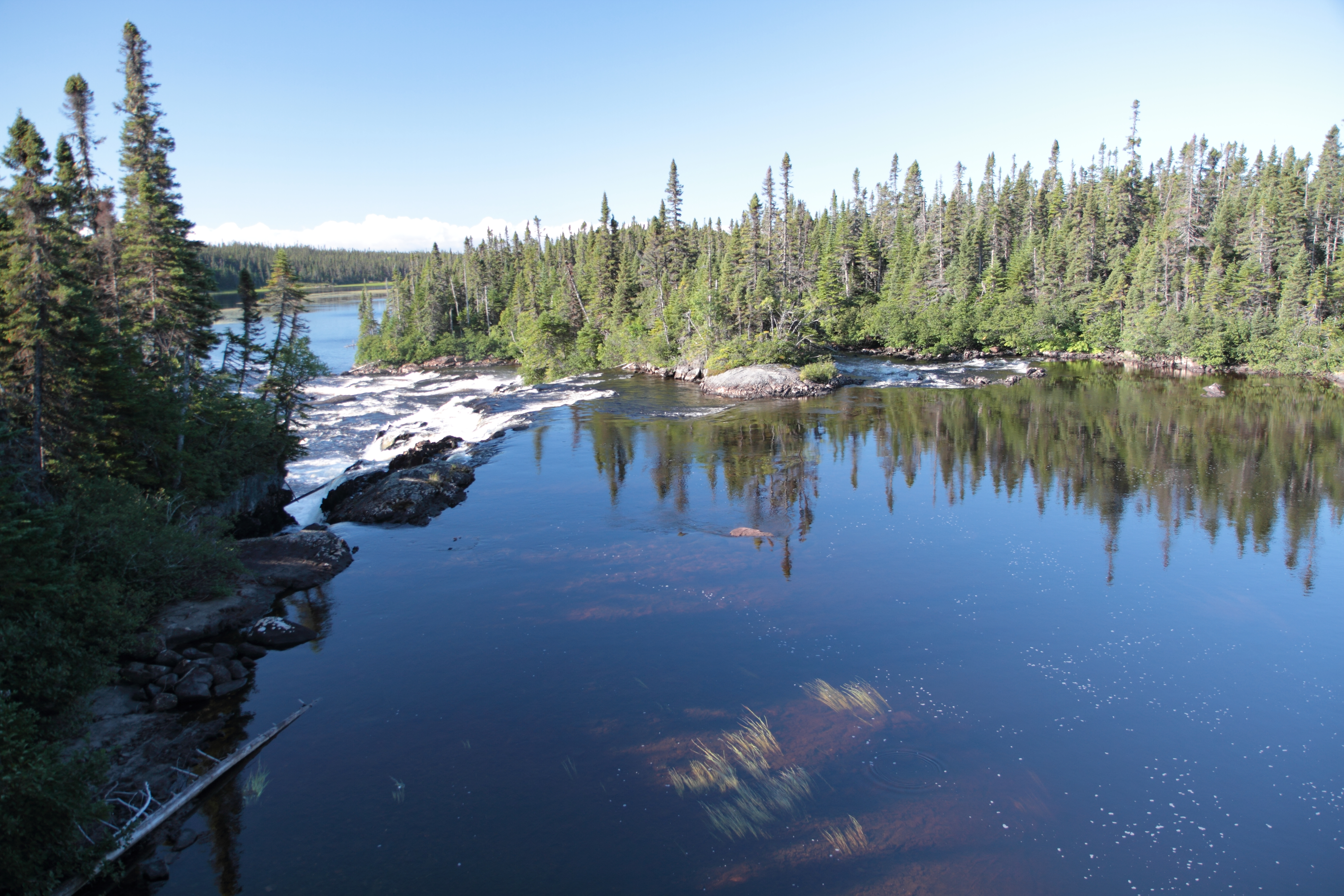
- The river from Route 138

- Location within Quebec
- Native name: Rivière Watshishou (French)

Location
- Country: Canada
- Province: Quebec
- Region: Côte-Nord
- RCM: Minganie

Physical characteristics
- Mouth: Gulf of Saint Lawrence
  - coordinates: 50.269303°N 62.691008°W
- Length: 80 kilometres (50 mi)
- Basin size: 1,044 square kilometres (403 sq mi)

The Watshishou River (French: Rivière Watshishou) is a salmon river in the east of the Côte-Nord region of Quebec, Canada.

== Location ==
The Watshishou River originates in Lake Watshishou, and flows south via Lake Holt and Little Lake Holt to enter the Gulf of Saint Lawrence. The river is 80 kilometres (50 mi) long, and receives water from many lakes. It drains a basin of 1,044 square kilometres (403 sq mi). Quebec Route 138 crosses the river near its mouth. It enters the Jacques Cartier Strait between Havre-Saint-Pierre and Natashquan, west of the Little Watshishou River. In its upper course the river flows through the unorganized territory of Lac-Jérôme. Lower down it flows through the municipality of Aguanish. The river's mouth is in the municipality of Baie-Johan-Beetz in Minganie Regional County Municipality.

The river basin lies between the basins of the Véronique River to the west and the Little Watshishou River to the east. The river basin contains the Nabisipi River Old Forest (Forêt ancienne de la Rivière Nabisipi) and the Lake Davy Old Forest (Forêt ancienne du Lac Davy). In the last 15 kilometres (9.3 mi) none of the land of the coastal region exceeds 150 metres (490 ft) in elevation. The terrain is fairly smooth, sloping gently down to the Gulf of Saint Lawrence. To the east of Watshishou Harbor the Morne Watshishou stands out at over 60 metres (200 ft).

== Name ==
The toponym Watshishou is probably the same as the "R. Oueachechou" on Boishébert's 1715 map, and "Oydchechou" on Bellin's 1744 map. Later maps spell it Watcheeshoo, Watsheeshou, Watscheeshoo, Watsjishu and Watchichou. The Dictionary of Rivers and Lakes of the Province of Quebec (1914 and 1925) gives it as Watshishou. In the Innu language it means "white mountain" or "bright mountain". It probably refers to the landmark polished granite Watshishou Hill, 45 metres (148 ft) high to the east of the mouth of the Watshishou River. Others say the word comes from watsh (mountain) and shu (small), meaning small mountain. Another Innu name for the river is Uetiheu Hipu, meaning "it rejoins".

== Fishing ==
Lac Holt Fishing Lodge provides access to the Watshishou, Big Holt and Little Holt lakes, and can be reached by float plane from Havre-Saint-Pierre. The lodge offers fishing from boats or wading below rapids. Fish include brook trout (Salvelinus fontinalis), Arctic char (Salvelinus alpinus), and landlocked Atlantic salmon (Salmo salar). A 2018 North Atlantic Salmon Conservation Organization (NASCO) Rivers Database Report gave the status of the river as "Not Threatened With Loss".

In May 2015 the Ministry of Forests, Wildlife and Parks of Quebec announced a sport fishing catch-and-release program for large salmon on sixteen of Quebec's 118 salmon rivers. These were the Mitis, Laval, Pigou, Bouleau, aux Rochers, Jupitagon, Magpie, Saint-Jean, Corneille, Piashti, Watshishou, Little Watshishou, Nabisipi, Aguanish and Natashquan rivers. The Quebec Atlantic Salmon Federation said that the measures did not go nearly far enough in protecting salmon for future generations. In view of the rapidly declining Atlantic salmon population catch-and-release should have been implemented on all rivers apart from northern Quebec.

== Sources ==
- Bourdon, Philippe; Ibrahim, Ghassen; Luce, Myriam; NantobBikatui, N’Binkéna; Othoniel, Clara; Tremblay, Yohann (April 2015), Portrait préliminaire de la zone de gestion intégrée de l’eau par bassin versant (PDF) (in French), OBV Duplessis, archived from the original (PDF) on 2019-09-02
- Dumont, Jean (June 1986), Prolongement de la route 138 entre Baie Johan-Beetz et la Rivière Pashashibou (PDF) (in French)
- Lac Holt Fishing Lodge, Lac Holt Fishing Lodge
- NASCO Rivers Database Report (PDF), NASCO, 17 January 2018
- Portrait préliminaire de la zone de gestion intégrée de l'eau par bassin versant Duplessis (PDF) (in French), OBV Duplessis, April 2015, archived from the original (PDF) on 2019-09-02
- Quebec salmon need stronger preservation rules, association says, Montreal: CBC News, 10 May 2015
- Rivière Watshishou (in French), Commission de toponymie du Québec
- Rivière Watshishou, Natural Resources Canada
- "Rivières de la Côte-Nord", GrandQuebec.com (in French)
