= Rivière-Saint-Jean, Quebec =

Rivière-Saint-Jean
- Municipality
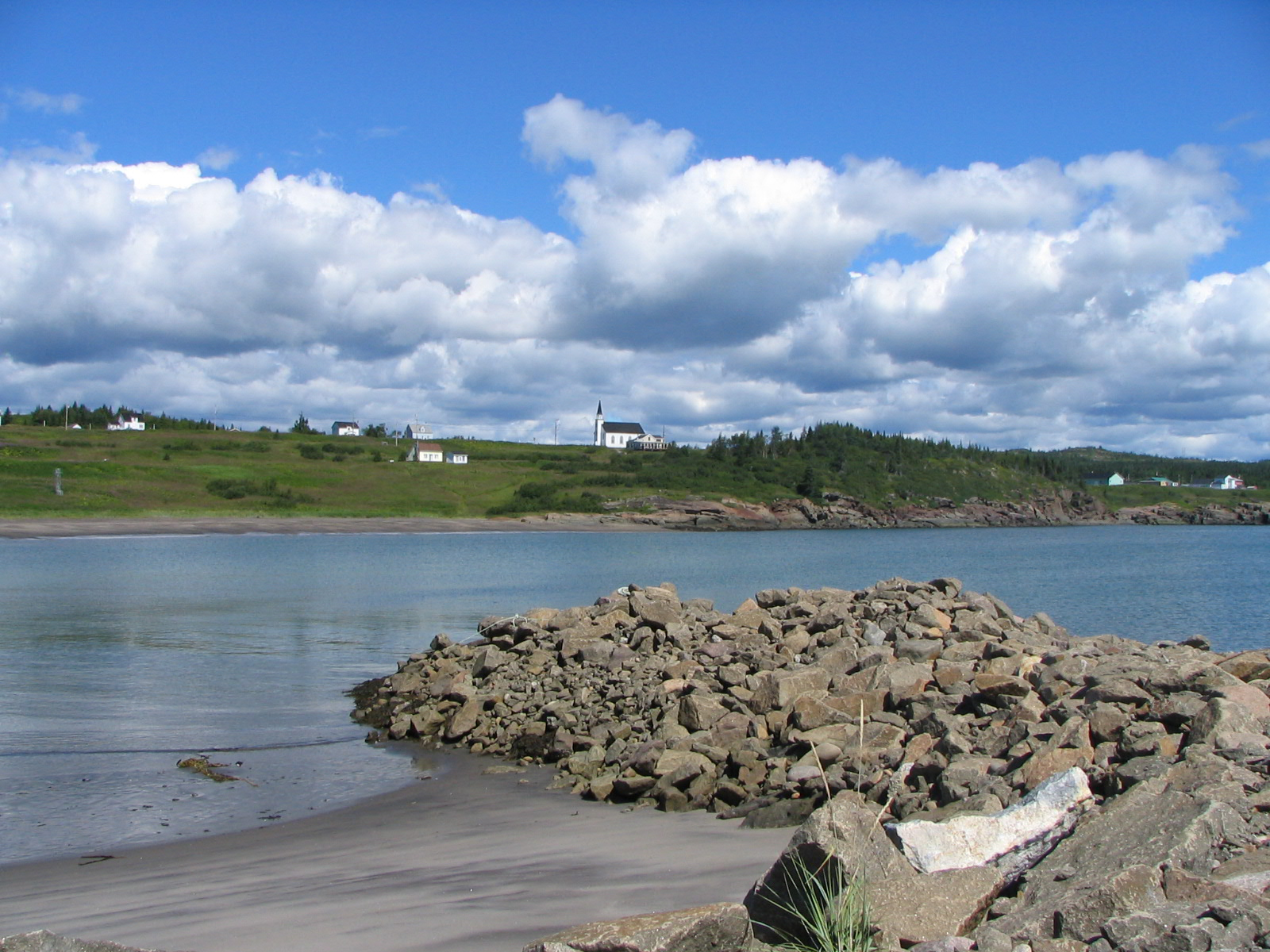
- Magpie village, Harbour, Saint-Octave catholic church, from Fishermen's St

- Location in Côte-Nord region of Quebec
- Coordinates: 50°18′N 64°20′W
- Country: Canada
- Province: Quebec
- Region: Côte-Nord
- RCM: Minganie
- Constituted: January 1, 1966

Government
  - Mayor: Josée Brunet
  - Federal riding: Côte-Nord—Kawawachikamach—Nitassinan
  - Prov. riding: Duplessis

Area
  - Total: 743.35 km^{2} (287.01 sq mi)

Population (2021)
  - Total: 227
  - Density: 0.4/km^{2} (1.0/sq mi)
  - Pop (2016-21): ▲5.6%
  - Dwellings: 169
- Time zone: UTC−5 (EST)
  - Summer (DST): UTC−4 (EDT)
- Postal code(s): G0G 2N0
- Area code: 418
- Highways: R-138
- Website: municipalites-du-quebec.com/riviere-st-jean

Rivière-Saint-Jean, (French pronunciation: [ʁivjɛʁ sɛ̃ ʒɑ̃]), "St. John River", is a municipality located close to the mouth of the Saint-Jean River and the north shore of the Gulf of St. Lawrence, Côte-Nord region, Minganie RCM, Quebec, Canada.

In addition to Rivière-Saint-Jean, the municipality also includes the community of Magpie Village, which is located near the mouth of the Magpie River.

== Magpie Village ==
Part of the Municipality of Rivière-Saint-Jean, Magpie is a village located on a hillside around Magpie Harbour, 3 km from a second slope, located west of Magpie Bay, in the Gulf of St. Lawrence, in the Côte-Nord region, Minganie RCM, Quebec, Canada.

Magpie is the English name for the Canadian gray jay commonly called magpie and scientifically Perisoreus canadensis.

== History ==
In 1876, the Saint Jean mission was established, located at the mouth of the Saint-Jean River after which the mission was named. The name "St. Jean" already appeared on a Franquelin map from 1684. Its post office opened in 1877.

The Saint-Jean Municipality was organized in 1968.

== Salmon fishing ==
From early June to mid-August, salmon fishing period, it is possible to fish with a permit, in a public sector of the municipality, between the Route 138 bridge and the mouth of the Saint-Jean River.

To enjoy sport fishing for salmon in a motorized canoe or wade over 27 kilometres, you must contact the river managers, the Association de protection de la rivière Saint-Jean and the Pourvoirie de la Haute Saint-Jean enr, non-profit associations (with exclusive rights).

According to Québec Saumon, each season on Saint-Jean River, the salmon runs can reach 6,000 salmon weighing between 4 and 10 kilos. In some areas, several salmon weighing more than 10 kilos have been recorded in recent years.

The Dictionary of rivers and lakes of the province of Quebec (1914), mentioned that the Robin House has a large cod fishing establishment in Magpie Village in 1870.

== Demographics ==
=== Population ===
Historical Census Data - Rivière-Saint-Jean, Quebec

Year	Pop.	±%
1966	732	—
1971	603	−17.6%
1976	537	−10.9%
1981	537	+0.0%
1986	456	−15.1%
1991	317	−30.5%

Year	Pop.	±%
1996	319	+0.6%
2001	287	−10.0%
2006	260	−9.4%
2011	239	−8.1%
2016	215	−10.0%
2021	227	+5.6%

Source: Statistics Canada

Canada census – Rivière-Saint-Jean community profile

	2021	2016	2011
Population	227 (+5.6% from 2016)	215 (-10.0% from 2011)	239 (-8.1% from 2006)
Land area	513.36 km^{2} (198.21 sq mi)	522.92 km^{2} (201.90 sq mi)	522.57 km^{2} (201.77 sq mi)
Population density	0.4/km^{2} (1.0/sq mi)	0.4/km^{2} (1.0/sq mi)	0.5/km^{2} (1.3/sq mi)
Median age	58.0 (M: 59.6, F: 56.0)	55.2 (M: 56.0, F: 53.8)	50.1 (M: 50.3, F: 49.8)
Private dwellings	169 (total) 121 (occupied)	151 (total)	150 (total)
Median household income	$.n/a	$62,208	$.N/A

Notes: 2011 income data for this area has been suppressed for data quality or confidentiality reasons.
References: 2021 2016 2011

=== Language ===
Canada Census Mother Tongue - Rivière-Saint-Jean, Quebec
Census	Total	French			English			French & English			Other		
Year	Responses	Count	Trend	Pop %	Count	Trend	Pop %	Count	Trend	Pop %	Count	Trend	Pop %
2016	215	210	▼12.5%	97.7%	5	▲ n/a%	2.3%	0	0.0%	0.0%	0	0.0%	0.0%
2011	240	240	▼4.0%	100.0%	0	0.0%	0.0%	0	0.0%	0.0%	0	▼100.0%	0.0%
2006	260	250	▼10.7%	96.2%	0	▼100.0%	0.0%	0	0.0%	0.0%	10	▲ n/a%	3.9%
2001	295	280	▼11.1%	94.9%	15	▲ n/a%	5.1%	0	0.0%	0.0%	0	0.0%	0.0%
1996	315	315	n/a	100.0%	0	n/a	0.0%	0	n/a	0.0%	0	n/a	0.0%

== See also ==
- List of municipalities in Quebec
