= Minganie—Le Golfe-du-Saint-Laurent =

- Census division
- Interactive map of Minganie—Le Golfe-du-Saint-Laurent
- Country: Canada
- Province: Quebec
- Region: Côte-Nord

Area
  - Land: 99,457.73 km^{2} (38,400.84 sq mi)

Population (2011)
  - Total: 11,708
  - Density: 0.1/km^{2} (0.26/sq mi)
  - Pop (2006–11): ▼1.6%
  - Dwellings: 5,203

Minganie—Le Golfe-du-Saint-Laurent is a census division of Quebec, with geographical code 98. It consists of the regional county municipalities of Minganie and Le Golfe-du-Saint-Laurent.

It was formerly known as Minganie—Basse-Côte-Nord, but changed its name in 2010 when Basse-Côte-Nord, which was a territory equivalent to a regional county municipality (TE), was replaced by the new Le Golfe-du-Saint-Laurent Regional County Municipality. The division had a population of 11,708 in the Canada 2011 Census. Basse-Côte-Nord itself was part of Minganie until 2002.

== Geographic hierarchy ==
Census Code	M or G?	Name	Type	Population 2011	Population 2006	Total dwellings	Dwellings usual res.	Land Area
2498030	M	Aguanish	MÉ	278	303	145	125	600.61
2498035	M	Baie-Johan-Beetz	MÉ	81	95	46	35	360.28
2498005	G	Blanc-Sablon	MÉ	1118	1263	508	426	247.63
2498010	G	Bonne-Espérance	MÉ	732	834	319	283	646.73
2498015	G	Côte-Nord-du-Golfe-du-Saint-Laurent	MÉ	971	1028	471	394	2845.04
2498014	G	Gros-Mécatina	MÉ	499	566	270	220	804.80
2498040	M	Havre-Saint-Pierre	MÉ	3418	3150	1484	1367	2821.65
2498020	M	L'Île-d'Anticosti	MÉ	240	281	161	123	7892.15
2498804	g	La Romaine	IRI	1016	926	267	262	0.88
2498904	M	Lac-Jérôme	NO	0	0	0	0	42690.50
2498045	M	Longue-Pointe-de-Mingan	MÉ	479	430	229	209	388.76
2498808	m	Mingan	IRI	453	407	133	133	16.89
2498806	m	Natashquan	IRI	841	810	190	182	0.65
2498025	M	Natashquan	CT	246	264	165	118	203.51
2498802	g	Pakuashipi	S-É	312	289	87	85	3.89
2498912	G	Petit-Mécatina	NO	0	0	0	0	37537.71
2498050	M	Rivière-Saint-Jean	MÉ	239	260	150	111	522.57
2498055	M	Rivière-au-Tonnerre	MÉ	307	390	335	157	619.20
2498012	G	Saint-Augustin	MÉ	478	599	243	187	1254.28
		Minganie—Le Golfe-du-Saint-Laurent	CD	11708	11895	5203	4417	99457.73
	M/m	Minganie	MRC	6582	6390	3038	2560	56116.77
	G/g	Le Golfe-du-Saint-Laurent	MRC	5126	5505	2165	1857	43340.96

In the second column:

- M = belongs to Minganie RCM juridically
- m = belongs to Minganie RCM geographically
- G = belongs to Le Golfe-du-Saint-Laurent RCM juridically
- g = belongs to Le Golfe-du-Saint-Laurent RCM geographically
