= Simard Lake (Petit-Mécatina) =

Freshwater lake in Petit-Mécatina, Quebec, Canada

- Location within Quebec
- Location: Petit-Mécatina / Kegaska, Le Golfe-du-Saint-Laurent Regional County Municipality, Quebec, Canada
- Coordinates: 50°17′24″N 61°20′29″W
- Primary outflows: River
- Basin countries: Canada
- Max. length: 12.2 km (7.6 mi)
- Max. width: 1.8 km (1.1 mi)
- Surface elevation: 32 m (105 ft)

Simard Lake is a freshwater body of the unorganized territory of Petit-Mécatina and the municipality of Kegaska, in the Le Golfe-du-Saint-Laurent Regional County Municipality, in the administrative region of Côte-Nord, in the province of Quebec, in Canada.

The maps of this area do not indicate a road suitable for vehicles in this area. However, route 138 which runs along the northwest shore of the Gulf of St. Lawrence, passes 7.3 kilometres (4.5 mi) from the south bay of Lake Simard.

== Geography ==
The main hydrographic slopes near Lake Simard are:

- north side: Katshiputiskamatunant Lake, Grand Priant Lake, Musquaro River, Mistahiniu lake;
- east side: Musquaro River, Kegaska Bay;
- south side: Anse Muddy River, Kegaska River, Belley River;
- west side: Kegaska Lake, Kegaska River.

With a length of 12.2 kilometres (7.6 mi), Lake Simard has a misshapen outline with several bays, islands and peninsulas. Lake Simard stretches like a large misshapen M overturned on the left.

Lac Simard is located north of a large swamp region that covers an area between the north shore of the Gulf of St. Lawrence and Lake Kegaska; this marsh area stretches east to the Musquaro River. The mouth of Lake Simard is located at the bottom of a bay southeast of the lake, either:

- 7.1 kilometres (4.4 mi) east of the mouth of Kegaska Lake;
- 9.5 kilometres (5.9 mi) north-west of the village center of Kegaska;
- 10.4 kilometres (6.5 mi) north-west of the mouth of the outlet of Lake Simard;

From the mouth of Lake Simard, the current flows for 15.7 kilometres (9.8 mi) towards the Southeast following the course of a river (outlet of Lake Simard) to a sub-bay of Kégaska Bay.

== Toponymy ==
The term "Simard" is a family name of French origin.

The toponym "Lac Simard" was formalized on December 5, 1968, by the Commission de toponymie du Québec.

== See also ==
- List of lakes of Canada
