= Nétagamiou River =

Nétagamiou River Rivière Nétagamiou
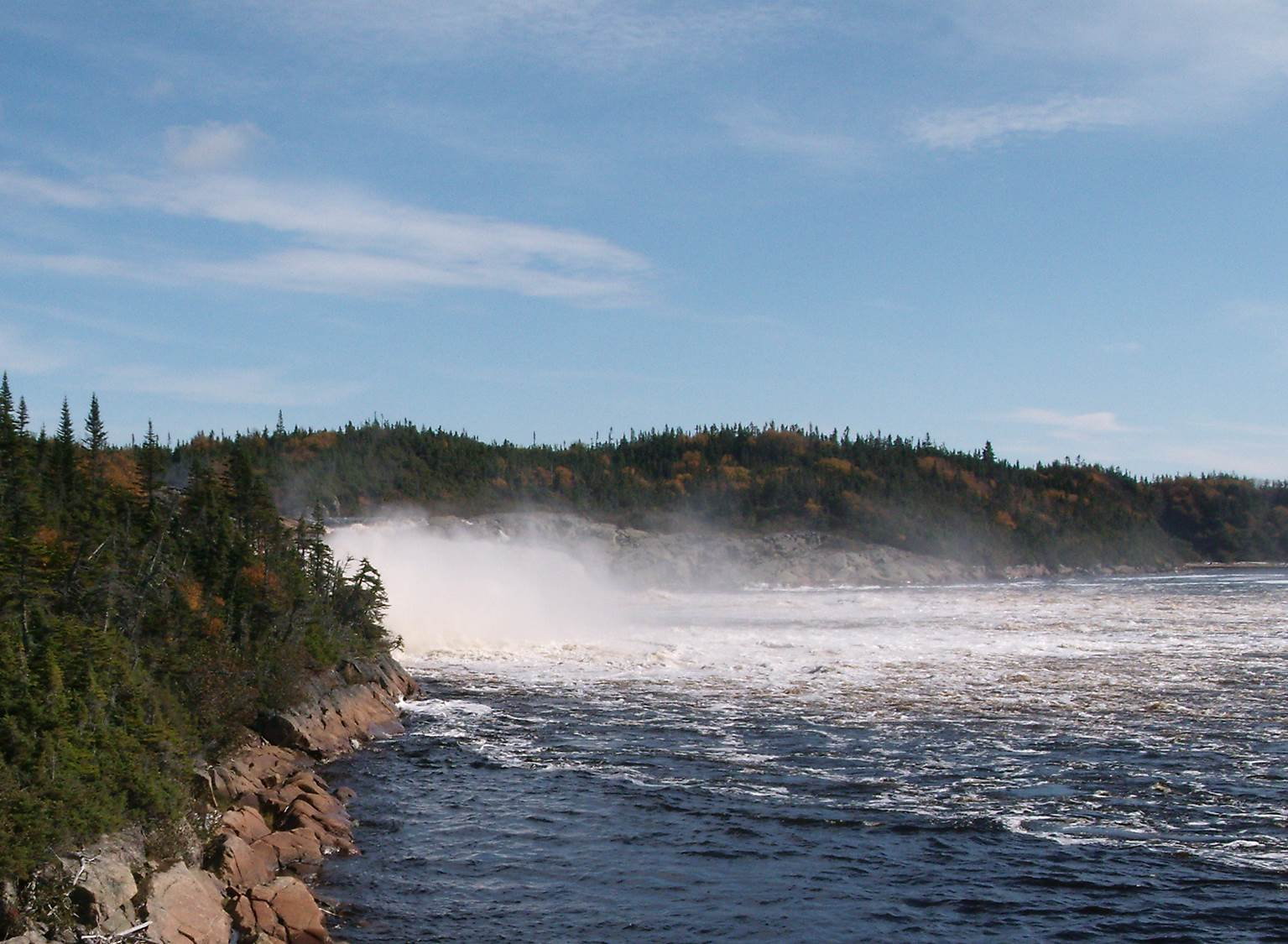
- Netagamiou Falls, accessible from the Bob Nunez Misty River Trail

- Location within Quebec
- Native name: Atauakanaih Hipu (Innu)

Location
- Country: Canada
- Province: Quebec
- Region: Côte-Nord
- RCM: Le Golfe-du-Saint-Laurent

Physical characteristics
- Source: Little Mecatina River
  - coordinates: 50.673012°N 59.603468°W
- Mouth: Gulf of Saint Lawrence
  - coordinates: 50.4694444°N 59.6072222°W
- Length: 23 kilometres (14 mi)
- Basin size: 229 square kilometres (88 sq mi)

The Nétagamiou River (French: Rivière Nétagamiou, pronounced [ʁivjɛʁ netaɡamju]) is a salmon river in the Côte-Nord region of the province of Quebec, Canada. It empties into the Gulf of Saint Lawrence.

== Location ==
The Nétagamiou River flows through the unorganized territory of Petit-Mécatina. It flows south to the Gulf of Saint Lawrence along the line that separates the cantons of Bellecourt and Saint-Vincent. The mouth is in the municipality of Côte-Nord-du-Golfe-du-Saint-Laurent in Le Golfe-du-Saint-Laurent Regional County Municipality. The mouth is about 80 kilometres (50 mi) east of the Innu reserve of La Romaine. It is 500 metres (1,600 ft) east of the village of Chevery, which is built on a point of sand and is accessible by boat from Harrington Harbour.

The watershed covers 229 square kilometres (88 sq mi). The river forms 23 kilometres (14 mi) north, where it branches out from the Petit Mécatina River. The mouth is blocked by a sandbar, through which it cuts a narrow channel 1 metre (3 ft 3 in) deep. Within the sandbar there is a natural harbor. Boats can travel upstream 2 kilometres (1.2 mi) as far as the first falls, which are 15 metres (49 ft) high. The falls can be reached by a footpath that runs along the first 4 kilometres (2.5 mi) of the river.

== Name ==
The name was spelled Natoüacamiou in the 17th century. It was spelled Nontagamion in a 1740 document. The name was written as Natagamiou in the 19th century and Nokatamu in the early 20th century. The name may come from the Innu language term nétagamiou meaning "river that goes underground", or may come from natuakamiu meaning "river widens to form a large pool of calm water". The Petit Mécatina Archipelago is a group of islands 3 kilometres (1.9 mi) southeast of the river mouth. The Innu use the name Atauakanaih Hipu for the river, meaning "lake invaded by water from another lake or river".

== Early European presence ==
In 1734 Jacques de Lafontaine de Belcour gained a valuable concession from the governor of New France, Charles de la Boische, Marquis de Beauharnois, and the intendant Gilles Hocquart. This was a monopoly for nine years on the Indian trade and seal fishery between the mouths of the Étamamiou and Nétagamiou rivers. He established a fur-trading and seal-fishing post near today's Chevery, at the mouth of the Nétagamiou River. From 1737 François Perrault operated the Nétagamiou River post in Labrador in association with Lafontaine. In 1740, François Perrault, his son Jacques Perrault and Charles Levreau, took a lease on the Nétagamiou post. The Poste-de-Nétagamiou is now an archaeological site.

Seals were used for their skin, meat and oil, which was used for lighting. They were trapped by nets stretched across channels along the coast that they followed in their migration south in the fall. Traces remain of holes drilled in the rocks to hold anchors for the nets. The site also holds the master's house and those of the employees, the store, warehouse and facilities for melting seal oil. In the early days several thousand seals were taken each year. The catch declined in later years, but continued after Lafontaine's bankruptcy in 1754 and after the English took over, lasting until the end of the 19th century.

== Fishing ==
Brook trout (Salvelinus fontinalis) may be caught on the Nétagamiou. There are no reports of Atlantic salmon (Salmo salar) catches between 1984 and 2017. In 2017 all salmon, large and small, had to be released on the Malbaie (Gaspé Peninsula), Pigou, Bouleau, Magpie, Coacoachou, Nétagamiou, Little Mecatina and Véco rivers. Only young salmon could be retained on 51 rivers, and limited retention of large salmon was allowed on 19 rivers.

== Sources ==
- Auger, Roland-J., "Biographie Perrault Francois", Dictionnaire biographique du Canada en ligne (in French)
- Bilan de l'exploitation du saumon au Québec en 2017 (PDF) (in French), ministère des Forêts, de la Faune et des Parcs, Secteur de la faune, 15 February 2018
- Chevery (in French), North Wind Power
- "Chevery", Tourisme Côte-Nord (in French)
- "Chevery, what to know", Discover Lower North Shore
- Mathieu, Jacques (1979–2016). "Perrault, Jacques". Dictionary of Canadian Biography (online ed.). University of Toronto Press.
- Portrait préliminaire de la zone de gestion intégrée de l’eau par bassin versant Duplessis (PDF) (in French), OBV Duplessis, April 2015
- Rivière Nétagamiou (in French), Commission de toponymie du Québec
- Rivière Nétagamiou (in French), Ressources naturelles Canada
- Site archéologique du Poste-de-Nétagamiou (in French), Ministère de la Culture et des Communications
- Standen, S. Dale (1974). "Lafontaine de Belcour, Jacques de". In Halpenny, Francess G. (ed.). Dictionary of Canadian Biography. Vol. III (1741–1770) (online ed.). University of Toronto Press.
