= Musquaro Lake =

Lake in Quebec, Canada

Lake Musquaro
- Location within Quebec
- Location: North America
- Group: Côte-Nord
- Coordinates: 50.596733°N 60.995336°W
- Primary inflows: Musquaro River
- Primary outflows: Musquaro River
- Max. length: 43 km (27 mi)
- Max. width: 8 km (5.0 mi)
- Surface area: 207 km^{2} (80 sq mi)
- Settlements: Kegaska, Quebec

The Musquaro Lake is located in the unorganized territory of Petit-Mécatina, Quebec, in the Regional County Municipality (MRC) Le Golfe-du-Saint-Laurent Regional County Municipality, in the administrative area of the Côte-Nord (North-Shore), in Quebec, in Canada.

== Geography ==
Located on the Côte-Nord (North Shore) of Gulf of Saint Lawrence, the lake Musquaro covers an area of 207 square kilometers. The lake is 43 km long and 8 km wide. This lake is formed by a major expansion of the river of the same name.

The lake Musquaro is the main body of water feeding the Musquaro River. The mouth of the lake which is located in a bay at the south of the lake is about 32.5 km (direct line) northeast of the village of Kégaska and Gulf of Saint Lawrence. The lake Musquaro is located south of La Pommeraye Lake, west of Lake Marie Claire, and 4 km north of Lake Musquanousse which discharges into the Musquanousse River whose mouth is 8 km to the east the mouth of the Musquaro River.

The shape of the lake Musquaro is complex. The lake is dotted with islands and peninsulas of all shapes and sizes. Many of these bays are a longitudinal shape. Located on the Côte-Nord (North Shore), this lake receives its water from some rivers and lakes including Lake D'Auteuil, west, which seems rather to be an extension.

== Toponymy ==
The term "Musquaro" is a translation adapted from Native American language, meaning "tail of a black bear". Montagnais designate the lake "Mahkuanu Nipi" or "lake of the black bear tail"; and the river "Kapitahkuiat Hipu" (or segments of the river) or Mahkuanu Hipu river "black bear tail". In his writings, the father Charles Arnaud indicates that up the Musquaro River, a mountain having the complete shape of a bear is encountered; and "not even the tail" is missing.

Naskapi uses the label "Maskuanu Shipis" meanings the little river of the "tail of a black bear." This name appears in the seventeenth-century documents, using distinctive spellings. On his map of the St. Lawrence River dated 1685, JB L. Franquelin shows "Mascouarou." In the nineteenth century and early twentieth century, the spelling of the river's name is varied, although the pronunciation is similar. Rouillard listed the following spellings: Muskwaro, Mascourao, Maskuaro, Masquaro, and Musquaro. In these graphs are added those of Maskouaro and Musquarro

The name "Lake Musquaro" was formalized on December 5, 1968, at the Bank of place names in the Geographical Names Board of Canada.

== Related articles ==
- Musquaro River
- Petit-Mécatina, Quebec, unorganized territory
- Le Golfe-du-Saint-Laurent Regional County Municipality,
- Côte-Nord, administrative region
- Kegaska, village of Côte-Nord (North-Shore)
- Gulf of Saint Lawrence
