= Washicoutai River =

Washicoutai River Rivière Washicoutai
- Location within Quebec

Location
- Country: Canada
- Province: Quebec
- Region: Côte-Nord
- RCM: Le Golfe-du-Saint-Laurent

Physical characteristics
- Mouth: Gulf of Saint Lawrence
  - coordinates: 50.2505556°N 60.8144444°W
  - elevation: 0 metres (0 ft)

The Washicoutai River (French: Rivière Washicoutai) is a salmon river in the Côte-Nord region of Quebec, Canada. It flows south and empties into the Gulf of Saint Lawrence.

== Location ==
The Washicoutai River is 103 kilometres (64 mi) long. The river narrows several times in its source, and runs through a succession of large lakes, some of which are up to 30 metres (98 ft) deep. It widens at its mouth, and the estuary, dotted with islands and islets, provides a refuge for a wide variety of seabirds. Its mouth is 13 kilometres (8.1 mi) from the village of La Romaine. It is in the municipality of Côte-Nord-du-Golfe-du-Saint-Laurent in Le Golfe-du-Saint-Laurent Regional County Municipality.

== Name ==
In the Innu language Washicoutai means "it overlooks the bay." It may refer to the fact that the river enters Washicoutai Bay by a 4 metres (13 ft) high. The name is found for the first time on a 1685 map by Jean-Baptiste-Louis Franquelin, spelled "Ouasassacouté". The name is also applied to the archipelago along the shore on each side of the bay.

== Description ==
The Dictionnaire des rivières et lacs de la province de Québec (1914) says of the river,

Situated on the north shore of the Saint Lawrence, it flows across the Laurentides and empties into the Saint Lawrence about fifty miles below the Natashquan river. According to the surveyor C.E. Forgues (1886), this river is navigable by canoe up to the foot of the great rapids 15 miles from its mouth. There is a fall 47 feet in height about seven miles from the Gulf of Saint Lawrence. This river is remarkable for its large lakes, of which some are more than 17 fathoms deep. Its banks are formed by granite mountains 300 to 500 feet high. This river is frequented by salmon, and the lakes have abundant trout. It is also excellent hunting territory. Game is found in abundance and it is also one of the places where bustards, black ducks and eiders have their nests. The surroundings of the river, according to the surveyor G. Leclerc (1910) are completely cleared of all wood for a length of 10 to 12 miles. There are also landlocked salmon in all the lakes formed by watercourses.

== Basin ==
The Washicoutai River basin covers 1,558 square kilometres (602 sq mi). It lies between the basins of the Musquanousse River to the west and the Olomane River to the east. It is partly in the unorganized territory of Petit-Mécatina and partly in the municipality of Côte-Nord-du-Golfe-du-Saint-Laurent. A map of the ecological regions of Quebec shows the Washicoutai River in sub-regions 6o-T, 6n-T and 6m-T of the east spruce/moss subdomain. Land mammals include black bear, wolf and moose.

== Fishing ==
The Washicouta, is recognized as an Atlantic salmon river. In 2013–2017 an average of 47 salmon were reported caught each year. The Pourvoirie de La Rivière Washicoutai provides outfitting services. They have exclusive rights to the river, and provide a salmon sport fishery along a 4 kilometres (2.5 mi) stretch. Anglers, wading or in boats, can catch salmon with an average weight of up to 5 kilograms (11 lb) as well as Arctic char, brook trout, landlocked salmon and anadromous brook trout.

== Sources ==
- Archipel de Washicoutai (in French), Commission de toponymie du Québec
- Bilan de l’exploitation du saumon au Québec en 2018 (PDF) (in French), Ministère des Forêts, de la Faune et des Parcs, May 2019, archived from the original (PDF) on 2019-10-14
- Bourdon, Philippe; Ibrahim, Ghassen; Luce, Myriam; NantobBikatui, N'Binkéna; Othoniel, Clara; Tremblay, Yohann (April 2015), Portrait préliminaire de la zone de gestion intégrée de l'eau par bassin versant (PDF) (in French), OBV Duplessis, archived from the original (PDF) on 2019-09-02
- Liste des rivières à saumon (PDF) (in French), Quebec government, archived from the original (PDF) on 2018-12-28
- Rivière Washicoutai (in French), Ressources naturelles Canada
- Rivière Washicoutai (in French), Saumon Québec
- Rouillard, Eugène (1914), "Washicoutai, (Rivière)", Dictionnaire des rivières et lacs de la province de Québec (in French), Québec. Département des terres et forêts
- Saucier, J.-P.; Robitaille, A.; Grondin, P.; Bergeron, J.-F.; Gosselin, J. (2011), Les régions écologiques du Québec méridional (PDF) (map), 4 (in French), Ministère des Ressources naturelles et de la Faune, archived from the original (PDF) on 2020-06-19
