= Musquaro =

Musquaro may refer to:

- Musquaro, a community of Côte-Nord-du-Golfe-du-Saint-Laurent, Quebec, Canada
- Musquaro River
- Musquaro Lake
