= Olomane River =

River in the Côte-Nord region of Quebec, Canada

Olomane River Rivière Olomane
- Location within Quebec

Location
- Country: Canada
- Province: Quebec
- Region: Côte-Nord
- RCM: Le Golfe-du-Saint-Laurent Regional County Municipality

Physical characteristics
- Mouth: Gulf of Saint Lawrence
  - coordinates: 50.2333333°N 60.6388889°W
  - elevation: 0 metres (0 ft)
- Length: 200 kilometres (120 mi)
- Basin size: 5,426 square kilometres (2,095 sq mi)

The Olomane River (French: Rivière Olomane) is a river in the Côte-Nord region of Quebec, Canada.

== Location ==
The Olomane basin covers 5,426 square kilometres (2,095 sq mi). It lies between the basins of the Washicoutai River to the west and the Coacoachou River to the east. It includes part of the unorganized territory of Petit-Mécatina, Quebec and part of the municipality of Côte-Nord-du-Golfe-du-Saint-Laurent. The proposed River Natashquan Biodiversity Reserve would be partially within the watershed.

The river is more than 200 kilometres (120 mi) long, flowing to the west of the Étamamiou River. It rises in a swampy area, first flows northwest, then makes an abrupt turn and flows south to the Gulf of Saint Lawrence. The mouth of the Olomane River is in the municipality of Côte-Nord-du-Golfe-du-Saint-Laurent in Le Golfe-du-Saint-Laurent Regional County Municipality. The Innu settlement of La Romaine is on the west shore of the bay at the mouth of the river.

== Description ==
According to the Dictionnaire des rivières et lacs de la province de Québec (1914),

OLOMANOSHIBOU, (Riviere) Situated 50 miles from Natashquan on the north shore of St-Laurent, Saguenay County. It is one of the most beautiful rivers in the North. Canadians refer to it more generally as GRANDE ROMAINE, although the word itself OLOMANOSHIBOU means "paint river". This river is full of voluminous salmon and trout. Landlocked salmon are also widespread in this watercourse. It is also, according to M. de Puyjalon, a hunting territory of high value, but in recent years, it has lost its importance in this respect. A mile from the entrance to the river is a village of about ten families. The Hudson's Bay Company has an exchange where about fifty Montagnais families come to trade each year. When it comes to residents, they are only occupied in fishing for cod and hunting.

== Name ==
Eugène Rouillard (1906) says the Innu language word Olomanoshibo means "Paint River" and refers to the reddish color of the water. Red ocher deposits are found on the banks of the river. The river is named Ouraman in the 1685 map by Jean-Baptiste-Louis Franquelin. Variants of the name since the 18th century include Eau ramane (Jacques-Nicolas Bellin 1744), Oraman, Ouramane, Oraman, Olomanosheebo and Olomanasheebou. The Olomane form was adopted in 1921. In the Dictionnaire des rivières et lacs de la province de Québec (1925) the river was named Grande Romaine to distinguish it from the Romaine River that enters the Gulf of Saint Lawrence 160 kilometres (99 mi) to the west at Havre-Saint-Pierre.

== Settlement ==
The Innu people have traditionally left their winter hunting grounds and lived at the mouth of the river in summer. A trading post operated at the mouth of the river from 1710 to 1925. A report dated 11 May 2009 said that the community of La Romaine did not support a project to connect the settlement to the main network from Natashquan, and a partnership for a 6.6 MW hydroelectric plant on the Olomane River, located near the village, was being explored. The existing 4 MW diesel plant was expected to no longer be sufficient by 2015.

== Sources ==
- La Romaine / Unamen Shipu (in French), North Wind Power
- Portrait préliminaire de la zone de gestion intégrée de l'eau par bassin versant Duplessis (PDF) (in French), OBV Duplessis, April 2015, archived from the original (PDF) on 2019-09-02
- Projet sur la rivière Olomane (PDF) (in French), Régie de l'énergie, 11 May 2009
- Rivière Olomane (in French), Commission de toponymie du Québec
- Rivière Olomane, Natural Resources Canada
- Rouillard, Eugène (1914), "Coacoachou, (Rivière)", Dictionnaire des rivières et lacs de la province de Québec (in French), Québec. Département des terres et forêts
