= Étamamiou River =

Étamamiou River Rivière Étamamiou
- Location within Quebec

Location
- Country: Canada
- Province: Quebec
- Region: Côte-Nord
- RCM: Le Golfe-du-Saint-Laurent

Physical characteristics
- Mouth: Gulf of Saint Lawrence
  - coordinates: 50.2808333°N 59.9788889°W
  - elevation: 0 metres (0 ft)
- Length: 160 kilometres (99 mi)
- Basin size: 3,000 square kilometres (1,200 sq mi)

The Étamamiou River (French: Rivière Étamamiou, pronounced [ʁivjɛʁ etamamju]) is a river in the Côte-Nord region of Quebec, Canada.

== Location ==
The river runs through the Basse-Côte-Nord between the Olomane and Little Mecatina rivers. It has a very irregular course of 160 kilometres (99 mi). Upstream from Lake Manet, about 75 kilometres (47 mi) from its mouth, the river divides into two sections which meet again at Foucher Lake, 55 kilometres (34 mi) further down. The river again divides into two channels 5 kilometres (3.1 mi) before reaching the gulf, which one arm enters downstream from the hamlet of Étamamiou and the other arm enters in Bussière Bay. There is an impressive rapids near the mouth, but above this the river is calm.

The mouth of the river is in the municipality of Côte-Nord-du-Golfe-du-Saint-Laurent in Le Golfe-du-Saint-Laurent Regional County Municipality. The river mouth is about 110 kilometres (68 mi) west of La Tabatière and 110 kilometres (68 mi) east of Natashquan. The Ouapitagone Archipelago is just south of the river mouth.

== Name ==
In the Innu language the word "aitumamiu" means "splitting in two" or "lake with two outlets". The name is related to Itomamo. In the past it has been spelled Etamamu, Itamamiou, Hightomamiou, Aitomami, Etaumamiu, Itamamu and Itumamu. The present form of Étamamiou was used on a regional map of 1913. At that time, two sections of the river were identified, but one was incorrectly shown as ending in Coacoachou Lake and the Bay of Wolves (Baie des Loups) in the west. The error was not corrected on the maps until 1950. The Innu call the river Uiahtehau, meaning "the leaves change color in the fall." It is also called Mistamiskaikan Hipu.

== Watershed ==
The river drains a watershed of around 3,000 square kilometres (1,200 sq mi). The mountainous region is rich in wildlife such as hare, ruffed grouse (Bonasa umbellus), spruce grouse (Falcipennis canadensis), ptarmigan (Lagopus), boreal woodland caribou (Rangifer tarandus caribou), moose (Alces alces), marten, Canada lynx (Lynx canadensis) and porcupine. The waters are used by beaver (Castor canadensis), muskrat (Ondatra zibethicus), otter, mink and migratory birds.

== European presence ==
Around 1733 Jacques de Lafontaine de Belcour established a French trading post at the river's mouth. In 1764 the post was sold to the English, and apparently remained in business for another 100 years. The river was explored in 1892 by the surveyor Louis Poulin de Courval. He said the main mouth was a good harbor, and the river was a series of lakes with abundant salmon and trout, flowing through excellent hunting territory. The hamlet of Étamamiou where the post stood is inhabited by a few families occupied in fishing and by an outfitter.

== Fishing ==
Salmon swim up the Étamamiou River for more than 140 kilometres (87 mi). The Étamamiou inc. outfitter located 5 kilometres (3.1 mi) from the river mouth belongs to the Unamen Shipu community of Innus. As of 2019 the Étamamiou Outfitters had exclusive fishing rights over the river basin. They provide Innu guides, transportation by float plane, accommodation and a chef. There are six salmon pools with rocky sand bottoms. Fishing is mainly from boats. In addition to salmon there are many anadromous brook trout.

== Sources ==
- Étamamiou Outfitters, ITAC: Indigenous Tourism Association of Canada
- Localisation de la rivière Étamamiou et du territoire de la Pourvoirie Étamamiou (PDF) (map) (in French), FQSA: Fédération québecoise pour le saumon atlantique
- Pourvoirie Étamamiou Inc. (in French), Voyages Inter Nations
- Rivière Étamamiou (in French), Commission de toponymie du Québec
- Rivière Étamamiou, Natural Resources Canada
- "Rivière Étamamiou", Saumon Québec (in French)
