= Basse-Côte-Nord =

Territory in eastern Quebec, Canada

Coordinates: 50.771°N 59.227°W

Basse-Côte-Nord Territory (French: Territoire de la Basse-Côte-Nord, pronounced [tɛʁitwaʁ də la bas kot nɔʁ], meaning "lower north shore") was a territory equivalent to a regional county municipality (TE) in eastern Quebec, Canada. The territory, whose geographical code was 982, was formed in 2002 when it separated from the Minganie Regional County Municipality and was superseded by Le Golfe-du-Saint-Laurent Regional County Municipality that was formed in July 2010.

Together with Minganie RCM, Basse-Côte-Nord formed the census division of Minganie–Basse-Côte-Nord (now renamed Minganie–Le Golfe-du-Saint-Laurent), whose geographical code is 98.

Basse-Côte-Nord had a land area of 5,803.26 square kilometres (2,240.65 sq mi) and a 2006 census population of 5,505 inhabitants. It included all the communities along the Gulf of Saint Lawrence between the Natashquan River and the Newfoundland and Labrador border, but it had no regional administration.

Basse-Côte-Nord consisted of the following subdivisions, with their geographic codes in parentheses:

- Municipality of Blanc-Sablon (98005)
- Municipality of Bonne-Espérance (98010)
- Municipality of Côte-Nord-du-Golfe-du-Saint-Laurent (98015)
- Municipality of Gros-Mécatina (98014)
- Municipality of Saint-Augustin (98012)
- Indian reserve of La Romaine (98804)
- Indian settlement of Pakuashipi (98802), located within the legal territory of Saint-Augustin.
