= Ouapitagone Archipelago =

Islands in Quebec, Canada

Native name: Archipel de Ouapitagone
- Location within Quebec

Geography
- Location: Gulf of Saint Lawrence
- Coordinates: 50.195556°N 60.279722°W

Administration
- Canada
- Province: Quebec
- Region: Côte-Nord
- RCM: Le Golfe-du-Saint-Laurent

The Ouapitagone Archipelago (French: Archipel de Ouapitagone) is a small group of rocky islands in the province of Quebec, Canada. They are off the Côte-Nord (North Shore) of the Gulf of Saint Lawrence.

== Location ==
The islands are in the municipality of Côte-Nord-du-Golfe-du-Saint-Laurent in Le Golfe-du-Saint-Laurent Regional County Municipality. The group of islands and rocks protect Ouapitagone Harbour and the Ouapitagone Strait. Islands include the main Ouapitagone Island, Lac Island, the Ouapitagone du Large Islands and the Cormoran Rocks. They give their name to the canton of Archipel-de-Ouapitagone.

The islands are near the mouth of the Étamamiou River. They are made of high granite rocks. Local fishermen have visited them for many years to harvest the abundant wolffish (Anarhichadidae). Navigators in the past often used the islands as a source of fresh water.

== Name ==
Jacques Cartier mentioned the islands in 1535, and called them the Ysles Sainct Germain. The islands are called Ouapitougan on Bellin's map of 1744 and Wapitagun on an 1877 map by the hydrographer H. W. Bayfield. Later sources use Wapeetougone, Wapitagone, and Jupitagun. Some say these are variants of the Innu language word Shushupitagon, meaning "whetstone". Others say that Ouapitagone is the name of the rare white-winged cormorant, or could mean "place marked by the white droppings of cormorants". The Innu of the region call the Ouapitagone du Large island Matshatihk Kaiapit Ministukua, meaning "Island of the deformed caribou."

== Navigation ==
Between Point Sealnet and Ouapitagone Island 10 miles (16 km) to southwest there are many small islands and rocks as far as 2 miles (3.2 km) offshore. Only small vessels can navigate these waters, and the crew must have local knowledge of the Ouapitagone Archipelago. The Cormoran Rocks, 1.8 miles (2.9 km) from Ouapitagone Island, are marked with a light from a tower. Small craft can anchor in Ouapitagone Harbour, which is between Ouapitagone Island and the outer islands, but again local knowledge is needed to navigate the two entrances. The south coast of Lac Island has red, craggy cliffs more than 30 metres (98 ft) high that have been stained white by seabirds.

== Sources ==
- Archipel de Ouapitagone (in French), Commission de toponymie du Québec
- Archipel de Ouapitagone (in French), Ressources naturelles Canada
- Localisation de la rivière Étamamiou et du territoire de la Pourvoirie Étamamiou (PDF) (map) (in French), FQSA: Fédération québecoise pour le saumon atlantique
- Sailing Directions Gulf of St. Lawrence (Northeast Portion) (PDF), Fisheries and Oceans Canada, 2006
