= Simard Lake =

Simard Lake or Lac Simard may refer to:

- Simard Lake (Témiscamingue), a freshwater body in the Ottawa River water basin in Témiscamingue Regional County Municipality, Quebec, Canada
- Simard Lake (Gouin Reservoir), a freshwater body located in the northwestern part of the Gouin reservoir, in La Tuque, Quebec, Canada
- Simard Lake (Petit-Mécatina), a freshwater body in Petit-Mécatina, Quebec, Canada

== See also ==
- Simard (disambiguation)
