= Simard =

Simard is a surname from Germanic sig (victory) and mar (famous), and may refer to:

- Albert Simard
- Amanda Simard
- Christian Simard
- Claude A. Simard
- Francis Simard
- Georges-Honoré Simard
- Ive Simard (tanguero and choreographer)
- Mario Simard
- Nathalie Simard
- Raymond Simard
- Réal Simard
- René Simard
- René Simard (health professional)
- Sophie Simard
- Suzanne Simard
- Sylvain Simard
- Télesphore Simard (mayor)
- Télesphore Simard (MNA)

== Places ==
- Simard, Saône-et-Loire, a commune in the French region of Bourgogne
- Simard Lake (disambiguation)
