= Coacoachou River =

Coacoachou River Rivière Coacoachou
- Location within Quebec
- Native name: Natistagoua (Innu)

Location
- Country: Canada
- Province: Quebec
- Region: Côte-Nord
- RCM: Le Golfe-du-Saint-Laurent

Physical characteristics
- Source: Coacoachou Lake
  - coordinates: 50.2775°N 60.294444°W
- Mouth: Gulf of Saint Lawrence
  - coordinates: 50.2775°N 60.2944444°W
- Length: 12 kilometres (7.5 mi)
- Basin size: 408 square kilometres (158 sq mi)

The Coacoachou River (French: Rivière Coacoachou) is a river in the Côte-Nord region of Quebec, Canada.

== Location ==
The river basin covers 408 square kilometres (158 sq mi). It includes parts of the unorganized territory of Petit-Mécatina and the municipality of Côte-Nord-du-Golfe-du-Saint-Laurent. The mouth of the river is in the municipality of Côte-Nord-du-Golfe-du-Saint-Laurent in Le Golfe-du-Saint-Laurent Regional County Municipality.

The river flows from the 15 kilometres (9.3 mi) long Lake Coacoachou via Lake Tshipitnauman into Salé Lake. Salé Lake is a widening of the Coacoachou River, which flows from north to south for about 12 kilometres (7.5 mi) and empties into Coacoachou bay, an indentation in the Saint Lawrence coast about 100 kilometres (62 mi) east of Natashquan The bay is the only harbor on this part of the coast for mid-sized ships, but the many shoals and rocks make the entrance difficult. However, according to the Dictionnaire des rivières et lacs de la province de Québec (1914),

It is easy to access, boats of great tonnage can come to anchor on eight fathoms and on a good bottom. This river is frequented by an enormous quantity of trout, and these, according to M. de Puxjalon (1899), are sometimes of surprising size, activity, and vigor, which one meets only in this stream. The savages frequently go up this river which leads them inside by easy ways. There is game in large quantities.

== Name ==
The Innu of the region used the river to access their hunting grounds, and called it Natistagoua, or "Caribou River". In 1694 Louis Jolliet stopped in the "Natistagoua Harbor", and this name appears on a map from 1784. Thomas Wright uses "Natistagoet Harbour" on a 1790 map. The Innu language term koakoachu or coacoacho means "wolverine" or "savage devil", a greedy, cunning and carnivorous animal. The name Coacoachou appears in 1833 on a map by Bayfield to designate the bay.

== Fishing ==
Initially the Innu people of the region used the rivers freely as highways and sources of fish. By 1845, suffering from famine, they began to lay claim to the rivers. The "salmon war" of 1981–1983 mostly concerned four rivers, the Moisie, Natashquan, Coacoachou and Olomane. Private ownership of most but not all rivers was removed as a result.

In 2017 all salmon, large and small, had to be released on the Malbaie (Gaspé Peninsula), Pigou, Bouleau, Magpie, Coacoachou, Nétagamiou, Little Mécatina and Véco rivers. Only young salmon could be retained on 51 rivers, and limited retention of large salmon was allowed on 19 rivers.

== Sources ==
- Bilan de l'exploitation du saumon au Québec en 2017 (PDF) (in French), ministère des Forêts, de la Faune et des Parcs, Secteur de la faune, 15 February 2018
- Hubermont, Guillaume (4 May 2017), Les Innus revendiquent leurs droits sur la Moisie (in French)
- Portrait préliminaire de la zone de gestion intégrée de l'eau par bassin versant Duplessis (PDF) (in French), OBV Duplessis, April 2015
- Rivière Coacoachou (in French), Commission de toponymie du Québec
- Rivière Coacoachou (in French), Ressources naturelles Canada
- Rouillard, Eugène (1914), "Coacoachou, (Rivière)", Dictionnaire des rivières et lacs de la province de Québec (in French), Québec. Département des terres et forêts
