= Musquanousse River =

Musquanousse River Rivière Musquanousse
- Location within Quebec

Location
- Country: Canada
- Province: Quebec
- Region: Côte-Nord
- RCM: Le Golfe-du-Saint-Laurent

Physical characteristics
- Mouth: Gulf of Saint Lawrence
  - coordinates: 50.2111111°N 60.9627778°W
  - elevation: 0 metres (0 ft)
- Length: 28 kilometres (17 mi)
- Basin size: 338 square kilometres (131 sq mi)

The Musquanousse River (French: Rivière Musquanousse) is a salmon river in the Côte-Nord region of Quebec, Canada. It flows south and empties into the Gulf of Saint Lawrence.

== Location ==
The Musquanousse River is 28 kilometres (17 mi) long from its source. It forms as a stream that drains Lake Musquanousse, which is 19 kilometres (12 mi) long and 4.7 kilometres (2.9 mi) wide. The river then traces an erratic path through many lakes, including Lake Marie-Claire, Lake Des Outardes and Lake Missu before flowing for about 20 kilometres (12 mi) to the Gulf. In this section the river descends through falls and numerous rapids towards a broad T-shaped bay, which connects by a narrow neck with the Gulf.

The mouth of the Musquanousse River is about 10 kilometres (6.2 mi) east of the Musquaro River. It is in the municipality of Côte-Nord-du-Golfe-du-Saint-Laurent in Le Golfe-du-Saint-Laurent Regional County Municipality.

== Name ==
In 1694 Louis Jolliet wrote of the Mascoüarou and smaller Mascoüarouchis rivers. The name means "little river of the black bear tail". The surveyor J. B. A. Gould gave the lake and river this name in 1899 in a survey report. The Musquanousse River is also known as the "Little Musquaro River".

== Description ==
The Dictionnaire des rivières et lacs de la province de Québec (1914) says of the river,

Also called the Petit Musquarro. It is a watercourse of the north coast that empties into the Gulf of Saint Lawrence, and which flows between rocky mountains. It is the first river one encounters below the Musquarro River. It is navigable by canoe for a length of about five miles, then until Lake Musquanousse it is nothing but a contonuous sequence of falls, rapids and small lakes. There are few trees on the banks of the river. All the surrounding region is good hunting territory. The river itself is home to otters, ducks, plovers, snipes etc. There are many trout at the foot of the falls.

== Basin ==
The Musquanousse River basin covers 338 square kilometres (131 sq mi). It lies between the basins of the Musquaro River to the west and the Washicoutai River to the east. It is partly in the unorganized territory of Petit-Mécatina and partly in the municipality of Côte-Nord-du-Golfe-du-Saint-Laurent. A map of the ecological regions of Quebec shows the Musquanousse River in sub-regions 6o-T, 6n-T and 6m-T of the east spruce/moss subdomain. Wildlife in this mountainous landscape include Moose, bear, wolf and bald eagle. The river is also frequented by bustards and ducks.

== Fishing ==
The Musquanousse, including lakes Marie-Claire, Missu, Musquanousse and Des Outardes, is recognized as an Atlantic salmon river. Between 2013 and 2017 an average of 24 salmon were reported caught each year. The six lakes that the river flows through increase its effective length for fish from 28 to 60 kilometres (17 to 37 mi). All the lakes are accessible to salmon to varying degrees, and some reach Lake Musquanousse at the head of the river. The stream is home to Atlantic salmon and brook trout, including anadromous and landlocked specimens of both species. The Pourvoirie Musquanousse provides outfitter services. It holds exclusive rights over the entire river and chain of lakes, as well as the estuary. There are nine pools for fishing salmon by wading or from boats.

== Sources ==
- Bilan de l’exploitation du saumon au Québec en 2018 (PDF) (in French), Ministère des Forêts, de la Faune et des Parcs, May 2019
- Bourdon, Philippe; Ibrahim, Ghassen; Luce, Myriam; NantobBikatui, N'Binkéna; Othoniel, Clara; Tremblay, Yohann (April 2015), Portrait préliminaire de la zone de gestion intégrée de l'eau par bassin versant (PDF) (in French), OBV Duplessis
- Lac Musquanousse (in French), Commission de toponymie du Québec
- Liste des rivières à saumon (PDF) (in French), Quebec government
- Rivière Musquanousse (in French), Commission de toponymie du Québec
- Rivière Musquanousse (in French), Ressources naturelles Canada
- Rivière Musquanousse (in French), Saumon Québec
- Rouillard, Eugène (1914), "Musquanousse, (Rivière)", Dictionnaire des rivières et lacs de la province de Québec (in French), Québec. Département des terres et forêts
- Saucier, J.-P.; Robitaille, A.; Grondin, P.; Bergeron, J.-F.; Gosselin, J. (2011), Les régions écologiques du Québec méridional (PDF) (map), 4 (in French), Ministère des Ressources naturelles et de la Faune
