= Première Nation des Innus de Nutashkuan =

Coordinates: 50°08′N 61°48′W

Première Nation des Innus de Nutashkuan Band No. 83
- People: Innu
- Headquarters: Nutashkuan
- Province: Quebec

Land
- Main reserve: Nutashkuan
- Land area: 1.189 km^{2} (0.459 sq mi) km^{2}

Population (October 2019)
- On reserve: 1,100
- On other land: 15
- Off reserve: 102
- Total population: 1,217

Government
- Chief: Réal Tettaut
- Council: Maxime Ishpatao; Pierre Kaltush; Marcel Mestokosho; Paul-Émile Wapistan

Tribal Council
- Regroupement Mamit Innuat

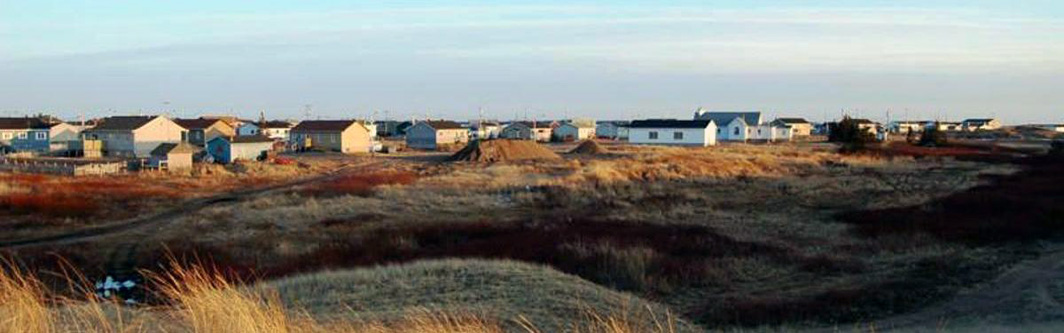
Nutashkuan Innu reserve

Première Nation des Innus de Nutashkuan (French: Montagnais de Natashquan, Montagnais of Natashquan or Nutashkuan Innu First Nation) is an Innu First Nations band government in Quebec, Canada. The band lives on Nutashkuan, an Indian reserve in the Côte-Nord region. As of 2021, they have a registered population of 1,217 members. They are part of the Regroupement Mamit Innuat tribal council.

== Demographics ==
Members of the Natashquan First Nation are Innu, also called Montagnais. As of July 2021, the band has a total registered population of 1,217 members, 117 of whom lived off the reserve. Statistics Canada's 2016 Canadian census found 835 people living on the reserve which was down slightly (0.7%) from the 841 people found on the 2011 Census.

== Geography ==
Montagnais of Natashquan owns one reserve, Nutashkuan located in the Côte-Nord region of Quebec close to the municipality of Natashquan. The reserve is at the mouth of the Natashquan River on the northern coast of the Gulf of St. Lawrence. It covers an area of 118.9 ha (294 acres). The reserve is 375 km (233 mi) east of Sept-Îles and 1,000 km (620 mi) east of Quebec City via Quebec Route 138. The band is also served by Natashquan Airport.
