= Kegaska River =

Kegaska River Rivière Kégaska
- Location within Quebec
- Native name: Tshehkahkau Hipu (Innu)

Location
- Country: Canada
- Province: Quebec
- Region: Côte-Nord
- RCM: Le Golfe-du-Saint-Laurent

Physical characteristics
- Mouth: Gulf of Saint Lawrence
  - coordinates: 50°10′44″N 61°21′03″W
  - elevation: 0 metres (0 ft)
- Length: 100 kilometres (62 mi)
- Basin size: 721 square kilometres (278 sq mi)

The Kegaska River (French: Rivière Kégaska) is a salmon river flowing on North shore of Estuary of Saint Lawrence. It crosses the unorganized territory of Petit-Mécatina, in the Le Golfe-du-Saint-Laurent Regional County Municipality, in the administrative region in the Côte-Nord, in the province of Quebec, Canada.

== Location ==
The river flows from north to south for almost 100 kilometres (62 mi) between the Natashquan River in the west and Musquaro River in the east. The river flows for about 80 kilometres (50 mi) through the hills, then meanders through the swampy lowlands before flowing into the Gulf of St. Lawrence. There are several rapids and waterfalls. In the downstream section it flows through Lake Kegaska, which is 12 kilometres (7.5 mi) long and covers 26 square kilometres (10 sq mi). It then meanders down into the marshes of the coastal plain.

The mouth of the river is in the unorganized territory of Petit-Mécatina in the Le Golfe-du-Saint-Laurent Regional County Municipality. Natashquan is about 30 kilometres (19 mi) west of the river mouth. The small village of Kegashka and the harbor of Kegaska are 5 kilometres (3.1 mi) further east at the other end of Kagaska Bay. The sandy beaches are known as an area to observe birds and marine mammals, and to gather clams. In early 2009 a new 36 metres (118 ft) long steel bridge was built over the river. It was needed to carry machinery for construction of an almost 30 kilometres (19 mi) section of Quebec Route 138 between Kegaska and the Natashquan River.

== Name ==
The Innu call Kagaska Bay Tshekahkat and call the river Tshehkahkau Hipu. These could be variants of the word tshakashekau meaning "rocky escarpment with a steep slope at its summit". Père Arnaud says Kegasta means "bay on each side of the point". Eugène Rouillard, in Noms géographiques de la Province de Québec et des Provinces Maritimes empruntés aux langues sauvages (1906), says it means "a peninsula". Another source says "kegaska" comes from the Innu word "quegasca" which means "a shortcut or easy passage at high tide between the mainland and the islands".

== Description ==
According to the Dictionnaire des rivières et lacs de la province de Québec (1914),

Located on the north coast of the Saint Lawrence, 21 miles east of the large river Natashquan and 498 miles east of Quebec City, in the canton of Kégaska. It forms a beautiful bay that provides an excellent harbor for small vessels. Part of this bay is occupied by fishing families. There are good waterfalls on this river. The surveyor G. Leclerc (1910) took this river to be one of the best hunting areas. Eider ducks, black ducks, bustards and wild geese make their nests here. There are also seabirds in fairly large numbers. The river is also full of fish. Salmon here are small, rarely exceeding ten pounds, and are never caught on the line. There is also a large quantity of trout, and whoever fishes for them, according to the surveyor Geo. Leclerc, can catch more than 150 in a day.

== Basin ==
The river basin covers 721 square kilometres (278 sq mi). It lies between the basins of the Natashquan River and the Musquaro River. It covers part of the unorganized territory of Petit-Mécatina and part of the municipality of Côte-Nord-du-Golfe-du-Saint-Laurent. Part of the basin is in the proposed Natashquan River Valley Biodiversity Reserve. A map of the ecological regions of Quebec shows the river in sub-regions 6n-T and 6m-T of the east spruce/moss subdomain. Along the river the vegetation is sparse due to the harsh climate and strong winds, and in some areas the gneiss and granite bedrock is exposed.

== Human use ==
In the past the Innu used the Kégaska River as a transportation corridor, then as a trade route during the fur trading period. In 1702 Augustin Le Gardeur de Courtemanche obtained a concession for hunting and fishing extending from the Kegaska River to the Kessessakiou River. Seal and whale oil were much sought after during this period for lighting. In 1831 the Hudson's Bay Company occupied a salmon fishing and trading post at the mouth of the river.

The Kegaska River provides excellent habitat for Atlantic salmon, which can use 100 kilometres (62 mi) of the river and tributaries. Sport fishing by boat or wading is practiced on the lowest 13 kilometres (8.1 mi) in four pools that are influenced by the tides. The average weight of salmon caught is 2.5 to 4 kilograms (5.5 to 8.8 lb). The Leslie Foreman Fishing Club, named after a family from Nova Scotia who settled there in 1855, holds the exclusive fishing rights to the portion of the river up to Lake Kegaska, which is about 30 kilometres (19 mi) from the estuary. The first cabins of the Leslie Foreman outfitter are at the mouth of the river. The outfitter also has a cabin 17 kilometres (11 mi) northwest of Kegaska near Lake Kegaska. This cabin could be reached by boat, but many portages would be needed. It is easier to reach the lake by float plane.

== See also ==
- Le Golfe-du-Saint-Laurent Regional County Municipality (MRC)
- Petit-Mécatina, an unorganized territory
- Kegaska Lake
- List of rivers of Quebec

== Sources ==
- Bourdon, Philippe; Ibrahim, Ghassen; Luce, Myriam; NantobBikatui, N'Binkéna; Othoniel, Clara; Tremblay, Yohann (April 2015), Portrait préliminaire de la zone de gestion intégrée de l'eau par bassin versant (PDF) (in French), OBV Duplessis, archived from the original (PDF) on 2019-09-02
- Bourque, Mylène; Provost, Virginie; Mazo, Gabriel (2009), Guide d'intervention en matiere de conservation et de mise en valeur des habitats littoraux d'interet en Basse-Cote-Nord (PDF) (in French), Comité ZIP Côte-Nord du Golfe
- "Kegaska", Basse-Côte-Nord (in French)
- Rivière Kegaska (in French), Commission de toponymie du Québec
- Rivière Kegaska (in French), Ressources naturelles Canada
- Rivière Kegaska (in French), Saumon Québec
- Rouillard, Eugène (1914), "Kégaska, (Rivière)", Dictionnaire des rivières et lacs de la province de Québec (in French), Québec. Département des terres et forêts
- Saucier, J.-P.; Robitaille, A.; Grondin, P.; Bergeron, J.-F.; Gosselin, J. (2011), Les régions écologiques du Québec méridional (PDF) (map), 4 (in French), Ministère des Ressources naturelles et de la Faune, archived from the original (PDF) on 2020-06-19
- Un nouveau pont sur la Kegaska (in French), Radio Canada, 28 January 2009
