= Jacques de Lafontaine de Belcour =

French Entrepreneur

- Born: 22 September 1704; Versailles, Kingdom of France
- Died: 18 June 1765 (aged 60); Quebec, Canada
- Occupations: Entrepreneur, administrator

Jacques de Lafontaine de Belcour (22 September 1704 – 18 June 1765) was a French entrepreneur who was involved in various business ventures in New France (now Quebec) such as trading with the Indians and hunting seals and whales. He became involved in various disputes and earned a reputation for being untrustworthy, but was supported by the governor of the colony. He went bankrupt in 1754, a few year before the British captured Quebec in the Battle of the Plains of Abraham (13 September 1759).

== Early years ==
Jacques de Lafontaine de Belcour was born Versailles, France, on 22 September 1704. His father was Jean-Baptiste de Lafontaine, a musician of King Louis XIV at Versailles, and his mother was Bernardine Jouin. He came to Canada in 1726 as the secretary of the new Governor of New France, Charles de Beauharnois. On 24 October 1728 he married Charlotte Bissot in Quebec, who bought a dowry of 4,000 livres. They had twelve children.

Lafontaine entered a partnership for ten years with his father-in-law, François-Joseph Bissot (1673–1737), to trade with the Indians and hunt seals at Mingan on the Labrador coast. The enterprise did not succeed. In 1732 Bissot agreed to pay him 2,000 livres to cover his losses and the partnership was dissolved. Lafontaine thought he could succeed on his own, and in 1733 leased Mingan from Bissot, then in 1734 broke the lease so he could exploit a valuable concession that Beauharnois and the intendant Gilles Hocquart had granted him. This was a monopoly for nine years on the Indian trade and seal fishery between the mouths of the Étamamiou and Nétagamiou rivers on the Côte-Nord.

Lafontaine became involved in various property disputes and controversies concerning his trade with the Indians and the rights to trap seals in the waters between Mingan on the mainland and the islands of the Mingan Archipelago. Around 1733 he established a French trading post at the mouth of the Étamamiou River. He also established a fur-trading and seal-fishing post at Chevery, at the mouth of the Nétagamiou River. The Poste-de-Nétagamiou is now an archaeological site.

== Councilor ==
In 1736, with the support of Beauharnois and Hocquart, Lafontaine was made a junior Councillor on the Conseil Supérieur, with a salary of 300 livres. He continued to spend most of his time on his commercial ventures and continued to be involved in legal disputes. From 1737 François Perrault operated the Nétagamiou River post in Labrador in association with Jacques de Lafontaine de Belcour. In 1740, François Perrault, his son Jacques Perrault and Charles Levreau, took a lease on the Nétagamiou post.

In 1737 Lafontaine was involved in a quarrel between the governor and the intendant when it was found that Hocquart had given François-Étienne Cugnet a lease on Tadoussac for a very low annual payment of 4,500 livres. Lafontaine and Guillaume Estèbe publicly offered to pay an additional 9,000 livres, but were ignored by Hocquart. From November 1740 to September 1741 Lafontaine was interim lieutenant general at Montreal for civil and criminal affairs in the royal jurisdiction. He made a second marriage on 7 August 1751 to Geneviève Lambert, who gave him three children. His business affairs expanded to include land on the côte Saint-Jean, a whale-fishing concession at a place named Apetépy on the Labrador coast and a sawmill on the Chaudière River, funded through loans and partnerships. Lafontaine went bankrupt in 1754.

== Last years ==
Lafontaine stayed in Quebec after the British conquest of New France, and in the fall of 1760 was appointed commissary and attorney general for the south shore by General James Murray. In October 1763 Lafontaine wrote to the Earl of Halifax accusing Murrary of various misdeeds, mostly fabricated. Murray was later completely vindicated. Lafontaine died on 18 June 1765 in Quebec.

A detailed inventory of his property by the notary Lemaitre La Morille on 11 July 1765 listed just five books: Pratique civile et criminelle (Civil and Criminal Practice) by M. Lange, Philosophie morale (Moral Philosophy) by Louis Delanclache, Dictionnaire français-latin (French–Latin Dictionary), Oeuvres de Virgile (Works of Virgil) and Instructions generales sur la juridiction consulaire (General instructions on consular jurisdiction).

== Sources ==
- Auger, Roland-J., "Biographie Perrault Francois", Dictionnaire biographique du Canada en ligne (in French)
- Burkholder, Mark A. (13 August 2018), Administrators of Empire, Taylor & Francis, ISBN 978-0-429-85552-8
- "Chevery, what to know", Discover Lower North Shore
- P.-G. R. (December 1942), "La Bibliothèque du Conseiller Lafontaine de Belcour" (PDF), Le Bulletin des Recherches Historiques (in French), 48 (12), Lévis
- Rivière Étamamiou (in French), Commission de toponymie du Québec
- Site archéologique du Poste-de-Nétagamiou (in French), Ministère de la Culture et des Communications
- Standen, S. Dale (1974). "Lafontaine de Belcour, Jacques de". In Halpenny, Francess G. (ed.). Dictionary of Canadian Biography. Vol. III (1741–1770) (online ed.). University of Toronto Press.
