= Little Mecatina River =

Little Mécatina River Rivière du Petit Mécatina
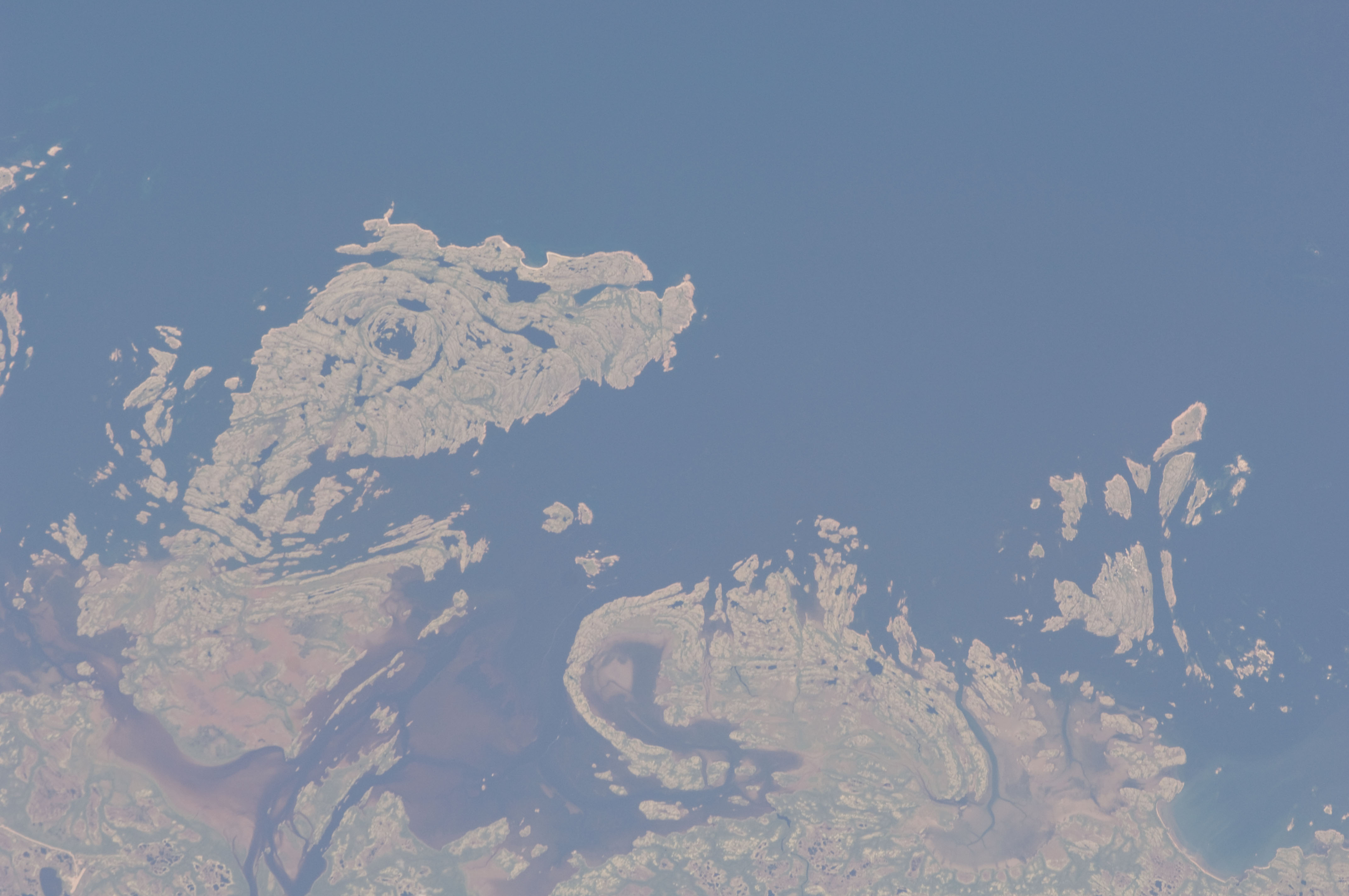

- Location within Quebec
- Native name: Nataukamiu Hipu (Innu)

Location
- Country: Canada
- Province: Quebec
- Region: Côte-Nord
- RCM: Le Golfe-du-Saint-Laurent

Physical characteristics
- Source
  - location: Newfoundland and Labrador
  - coordinates: 52.735838°N 63.054263°W
- Mouth: Gulf of Saint Lawrence
  - coordinates: 50.65667°N 59.42944°W -->
- Length: 545 kilometres (339 mi)
- Basin size: 19,590 square kilometres (7,560 sq mi)
- Discharge
  - location: mouth
  - average: 524 cubic metres per second (18,500 cu ft/s)

The Little Mécatina River (Note: French: Rivière du Petit Mécatina, pronounced [ʁivjɛʁ dy pəti mekatina]) is a major river in the Côte-Nord region of Quebec, Canada, with tributaries extending into Labrador. Studies have been made to exploit the hydroelectric potential of the river, which could be around 1,200 MW from three dams. The Little Mécatina River was explored first with kayaks by Rolf Theiß and Fritz Gottensrtöter from Guetersloh, Germany between 13 August and 9 September of 1973.

== Location ==
The Little Mécatina River is about 545 kilometres (339 mi) long, of which about 384 kilometres (239 mi) is in Labrador. The river has a Strahler number of 7. It originates to the east of Lake Aticonac near the border between the Atlantic and Saint Lawrence Basins. This is along the border between Quebec and Newfoundland claimed by Quebec, well north of the border defined in 1927 by the Privy Council. It flows through the unorganized territories of Lac-Jérôme and Petit-Mécatina. It winds in a generally south-east direction, then turns south and empties into the Gulf of St. Lawrence a short distance west of Little Mecatina Island.

The Nétagamiou River forms 23 kilometres (14 mi) north of its mouth, where it forks off to the right from the Little Mécatina. The mouth of the river is in the municipality of Côte-Nord-du-Golfe-du-Saint-Laurent in Le Golfe-du-Saint-Laurent Regional County Municipality. The proposed Harrington Harbour Biodiversity Reserve would lie in the river's watershed.

== Name ==
The Innu call the river Nataukamiu Hipu, or "river with broken waters". In Naskapi it is called Kuekuatsheunekap Shipu, or "wolverine river". Mécatina comes from the Innu language term makatinau, meaning "large mountain". The meaning in the Cree language is either "red mountain" or "large mountain". In 1694 Louis Jolliet used the term Mecatinachis for the island of Little Mécatina. Jean-Baptiste-Louis Franquelin used "Petit Mécatina" to identify the river in 1699.

The qualifiers Petit and Gros (Small and Big) were used to distinguish two trading posts in the 18th century. On 20 September 1739 Jean-Baptiste Pommereau was granted a concession for the Gros Mécatinat, and on 15 January 1740 the intendant Gilles Hocquart granted Henri-Albert de Saint-Vincent seven or eight leagues of shoreline at Petit Mecatina. The names of the rivers that led inland from these trading posts were translated as the Big Mecatina River (Note: Rivière du Gros Mécatina) and Little Mecatina River (Note: Rivière du Petit Mécatina) by the English.

== Fishing ==
In 2017 all salmon, large and small, had to be released on the Malbaie (Gaspé Peninsula), Pigou, Bouleau, Magpie, Coacoachou, Nétagamiou, Little Mécatina and Véco rivers. Only young salmon could be retained on 51 rivers, and limited retention of large salmon was allowed on 19 rivers.

== Hydrology ==
The drainage basin covers 19,590 square kilometres (7,560 sq mi). About 56.2% of the basin is in Labrador north of the provincial boundary. The river floods during the spring thaw, flow is reduced in summer, rises again in fall, then drops to a minimum in winter. A station near the mouth of the river records flows of 2,589.2 cubic metres per second (91,440 cu ft/s) in May, 231.95 cubic metres per second (8,191 cu ft/s) in September, 909.0 cubic metres per second (32,100 cu ft/s) in October and 88.43 cubic metres per second (3,123 cu ft/s) in March.

The Ministry of the Environment has operated a hydrometric station since February 1967 higher up at 0.5 metres (1 ft 8 in) from the Ruisseau Chanion. It monitors flow from a drainage basin of 5,504 square kilometres (2,125 sq mi). Over the period from 1973 to 2015, annual average flow varied from 45.53 cubic metres per second (1,608 cu ft/s) in 1987 to 126.0 cubic metres per second (4,450 cu ft/s) in 1980. Flow in 2015 averaged 82.6 cubic metres per second (2,920 cu ft/s), varying from 17.46 cubic metres per second (617 cu ft/s) in April to 407.9 cubic metres per second (14,400 cu ft/s) in May.

== Hydroelectric potential ==
Hydro-Québec has been considering a project to build a new 1,200 MW hydroelectric complex on the river, which has potential to host several dams. Just after work started on the Romaine River complex, in 2009 Prime Minister Jean Charest asked Hydro-Québec to start studies of developing the Little Mécatina River.

The project, which would flood 228 square kilometres (88 sq mi), would require consent by the La Romaine Band Council. Although studies began in 2002, as of 2011 the Innu had been given little information. The Quebec Prime Minister François Legault said during his 2018 election campaign that he wanted to start a major hydroelectric project during his time in office, and in November 2018 he met with Ontario premier Doug Ford to discuss sale of electricity to Ontario. Eric Martel, CEO of Hydro-Québec, said:

I can easily see that in 2021–2022 we will have make a decision to perhaps build something that would be ready in 2038, 2039 or 2040. The proposal is for three dams, which would be ready after the present surplus of electricity had ended.
