= Bouleau River =

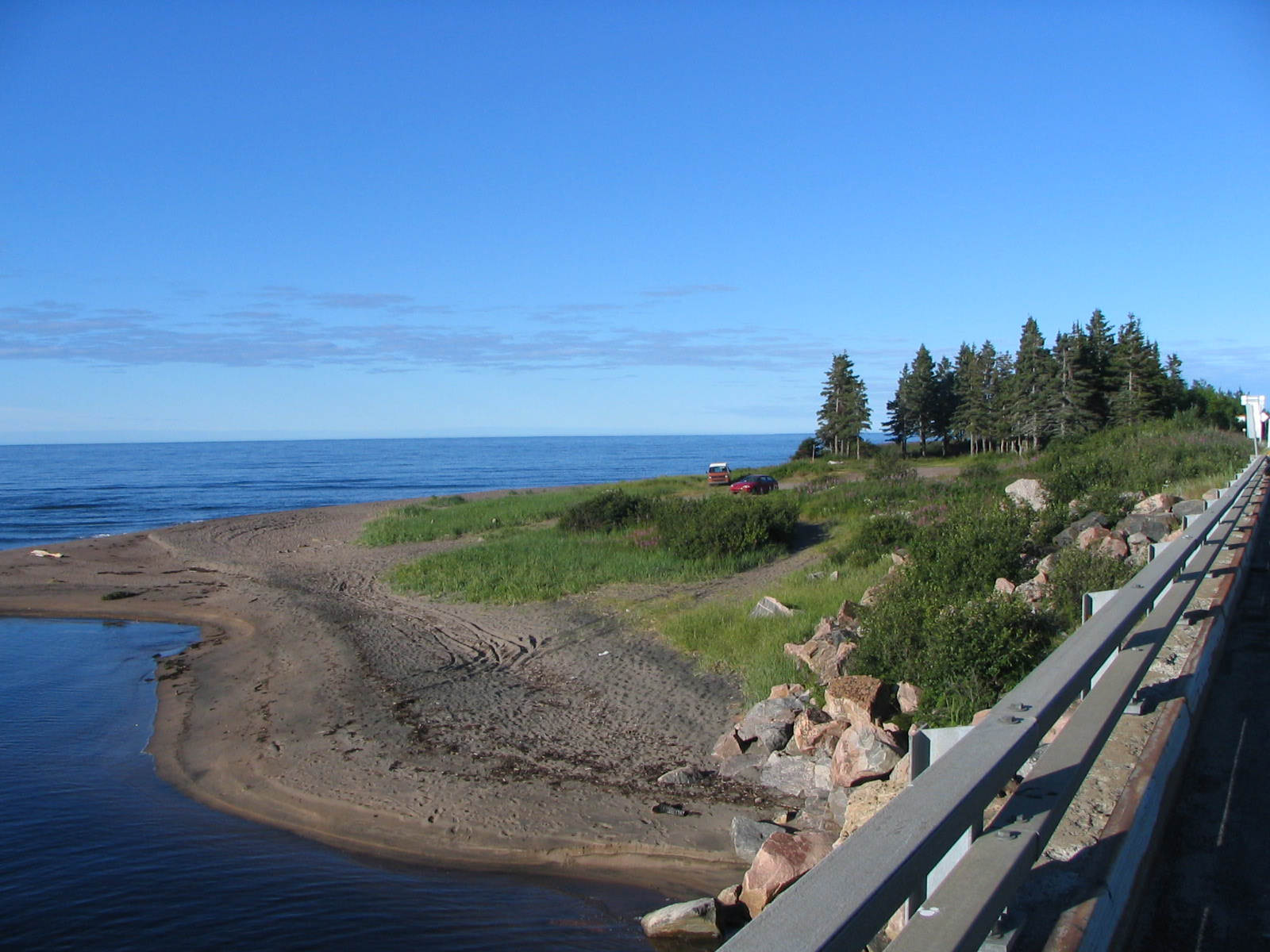
- Mouth of River, Gulf of St. Lawrence, rest area from Quebec Route 138, Rivière-au-Tonnerre

- Location within Quebec
- Etymology: Bouleau: Birch
- Native name: Rivière au Bouleau (French)

Location
- Country: Canada
- Province: Quebec
- Region: Côte-Nord
- RCM: Sept-Rivières, Minganie

Physical characteristics
- Source
  - elevation: 792 metres (2,598 ft).
- Mouth
  - location: Gulf of Saint Lawrence
  - coordinates: 50.281944°N 65.514722°W
  - elevation: 0 metres (0 ft)
- Length: 87 kilometres (54 mi)
- Basin size: 684 square kilometres (264 sq mi)
- Discharge
  - location: Mouth
  - average: 22 cubic metres per second (780 cu ft/s)
  - minimum: 5 cubic metres per second (180 cu ft/s)
  - maximum: 52 cubic metres per second (1,800 cu ft/s)

The Bouleau River (French: Rivière au Bouleau) flows north–south on the north shore of the Gulf of St. Lawrence, in Sept-Rivières and Minganie RCM, in Côte-Nord region, Quebec, Canada.

The Birch River is recognized as a salmon river along almost its entire length.

== Location ==
The Bouleau River has its source in the Canadian Shield also called the Laurentian Shield or the Laurentian Plateau, and runs through the boreal forest to its mouth in the Gulf of St. Lawrence about 68.5 kilometres (42.6 mi) east of Sept-Îles.

Its source is to the north of Lake Bigot, west of Lake Nipisso.

It rises at an elevation of 670 metres (2,200 ft), flows south for about 80 kilometres (50 mi), and has two major tributaries. The watershed covers 684 square kilometres (264 sq mi). The bedrock is Precambrian, covered in typical boreal vegetation.

The mouth of the Bouleau River is in the municipality of Rivière-au-Tonnerre in the Minganie Regional County Municipality.

The drainage basin covers parts of two regional county municipalities, within which it covers parts of four smaller administrative units:

- Sept-Rivières Regional County Municipality (92.9%)
  - Unorganized territory of Rivière-Nipissis, Quebec (85.3%)
  - Town of Sept-Îles (7.6%)
- Minganie Regional County Municipality (7.1%)
  - Unorganized territory of Lac-Jérôme (4.0%)
  - Municipality of Rivière-au-Tonnerre (3.2%)

== Toponymy ==
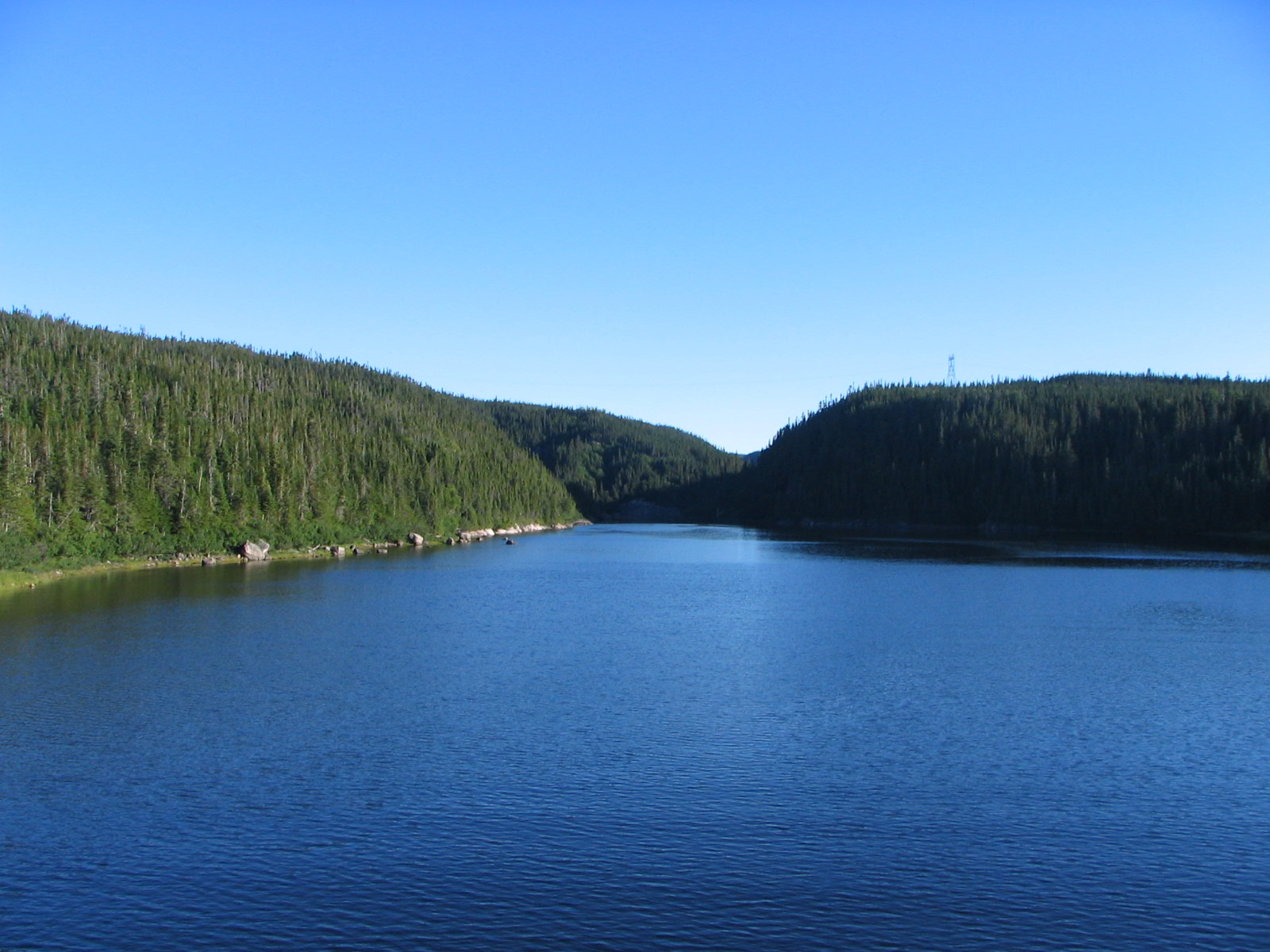
Birch River, upstream, from the Whale Route (138), Rivière-au-Tonnerre

The name "Bouleau" (Betula) means birch, a tree that grows in cold and temperate regions, with white bark and small leaves, whose wood is used in carpentry, cabinet making and for the manufacture of paper. The name was made official on 5 December 1968.

== Terrain ==
The bulk of the watershed is on the rugged Laurentian Plateau, with elevations of 400–800 metres (1,300–2,600 ft). The highest point is in the northeast, at 906 metres (2,972 ft). The plateau has hills or ridges with steep slopes and is cut by valleys whose sides are over 350 metres (1,150 ft) deep in places. Further south there is a piedmont sector about 24 kilometres (15 mi) wide with altitudes from 150 to 400 metres (490 to 1,310 ft). The piedmont has rounded hills and wide valleys. The coastal plain between the piedmont and the Gulf of Saint Lawrence is no more than 6 kilometres (3.7 mi) in width. It is relatively flat, sloping from 150 metres (490 ft) inland down to 100 metres (330 ft) along the sea, where the shoreline is formed by an escarpment almost 100 metres (330 ft) high.

The bedrock of the watershed, which is mostly exposed in the northern part, consists of deformed magmatic rocks. The north is dominated by gabbro, pyroxenite, troctolite and amphibolite. The south has granite, pegmatite and migmatite. The rocks in the south are partially covered by glacial till that is rarely more than 1 metre (3 ft 3 in) thick. The coastal fringe shows the influence of the postglacial Goldthwait Sea, which left large quantities of marine clay and silt sediments. These have often been covered in sandy deltaic sediments. The valley of the Bouleau holds glaciofluvial sediments.

== Environment ==
The Matamec weather station, 32 kilometres (20 mi) west of the river, records an annual average temperature of 1.5 °C (34.7 °F) and average annual rainfall of 1,020 millimetres (40 in). A climate model indicates that annual average temperature would be −1 °C (30 °F) in the northern part of the watershed, while average annual rainfall would be about 1,300 millimetres (51 in) throughout the watershed.

=== Flora ===
A map of the Ecological regions of Quebec shows the distribution of Betulaceae, the birch family and other families, in the territory. Forest cover consists of Picea mariana (Miller) BSP. — Épicéa marial. — Épinette noire. — (Black spruce) and Abies balsamea (L.) Mill. — Sapin baumier. — Sapin. — (Balsam fir), dominant on the coastal plain and north of the watershed, and mixed spruce/fir in the central zone of the Bouleau River.

There was a large infestation of hemlock looper moths (Lambdina fiscellaria) in the late 1990s and early 2000s that significantly damaged the fir trees.

== Hydrology ==
The watershed is very elongated, along a north–south axis of 75 kilometres (47 mi). Its greatest width is in the center section, where it reaches 20 kilometres (12 mi). About 6.85% of the basin is covered by water bodies, the largest being Lake Bigot in the north with an area of 9.1 square kilometres (3.5 sq mi). Due to the sloping terrain in most of the basin, wetlands such as ombrotrophic peatlands cover only 0.46% of the basin. The network of streams and rivers is angular, conforming to fractures in the hard bedrock, with straight segments between right-angled forks. In the plateau the rivers flow through narrow V-shaped valleys with very steep slopes. In the piedmont the valleys have the U-shaped profile typical of glacial valleys, and the rivers wander through the glaciofluvial deposits.

The Bouleau River has a length of 87 kilometres (54 mi) and vertical drop of 792 metres (2,598 ft). The most important tributary is the Chiskal River, which drains the northwest of the basin. The lowest part of the Bouleau River flows in a straight line through the coastal sediments in a narrow valley with sides of over 100 metres (330 ft), emptying into a 250 metres (820 ft) wide estuary with brackish water, partially blocked by a ridge at its entrance with an opening 125 metres (410 ft) wide.

Tides reach inland from the mouth to about 1.4 kilometres (0.87 mi). About 4 kilometres (2.5 mi) above the head of the tidal area there is a long stretch of powerful rapids that may block the further upstream progress of Atlantic salmon. Below these rapids the river has a gradient of 18.5 metres per kilometre (98 ft/mi). There are a few pool areas, but this section mainly consists of rapids flowing over gravel, large rocks and bare rock. The annual average discharge is 22 cubic metres per second (780 cu ft/s), varying from 5 to 52 cubic metres per second (180 to 1,840 cu ft/s).

== Fish ==
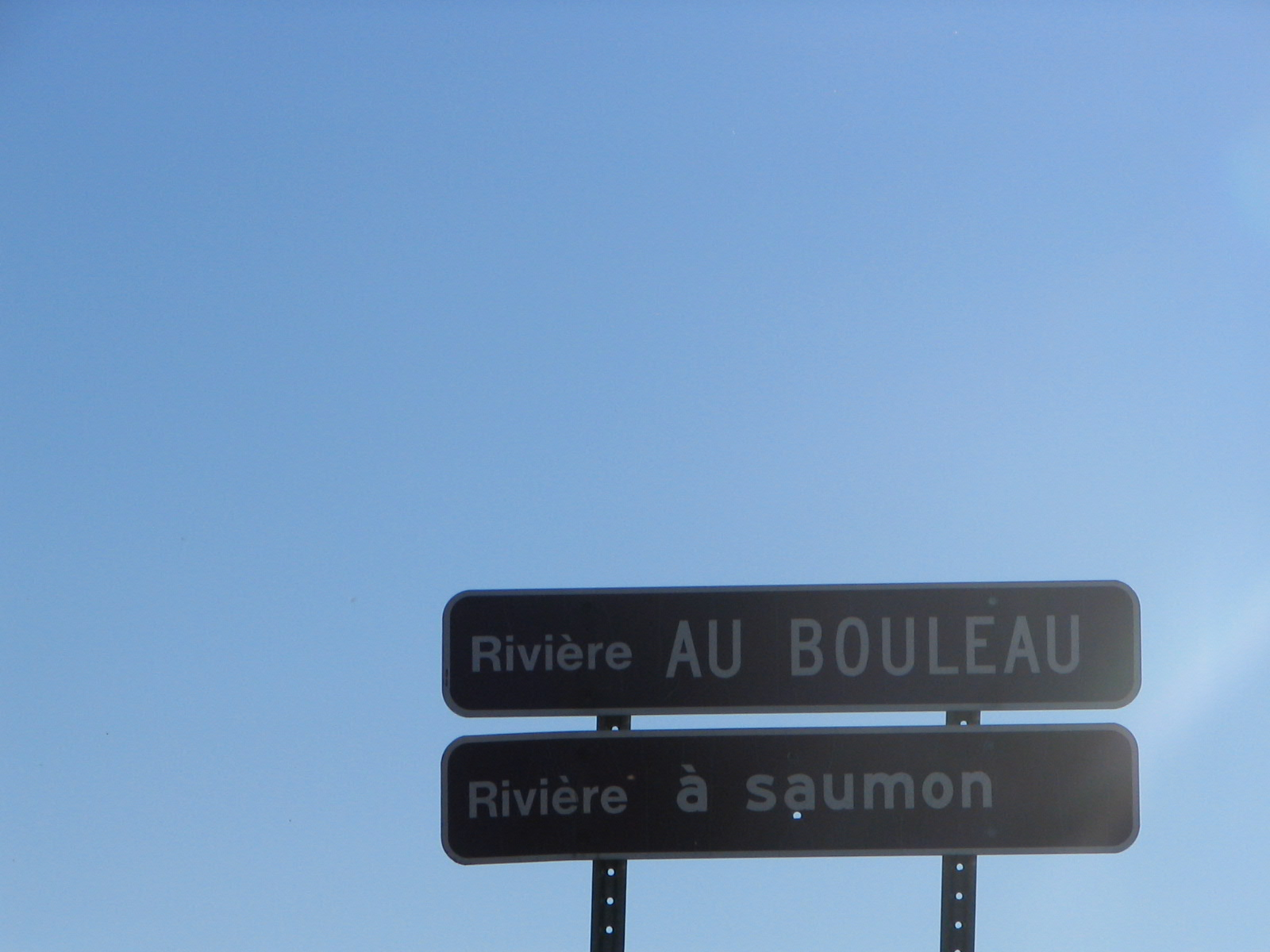
Birch River, salmon river, signpost, on The Whale Route (138)

The river holds anadromous Atlantic salmon (Salmo salar), brook trout (Salvelinus fontinalis), and less commonly American eel (Anguilla rostrata) and three-spined stickleback (Gasterosteus aculeatus). There are also alewife (Alosa pseudoharengus), Atlantic tomcod (Microgadus tomcod) and rainbow smelt (Osmerus mordax). The upstream section of the river is considered an exceptional habitat for young salmon. However, the large rapids 4 kilometres (2.5 mi) from the mouth limit their migration.

In May 2015 the Ministry of Forests, Wildlife and Parks of Quebec announced a sport fishing catch-and-release program for large salmon on sixteen of Quebec's 118 salmon rivers. These were the Mitis, Laval, Pigou, Bouleau, Aux Rochers, Jupitagon, Magpie, Saint-Jean, Corneille, Piashti, Watshishou, Little Watshishou, Nabisipi, Aguanish and Natashquan rivers. The Quebec Atlantic Salmon Federation said that the measures did not go nearly far enough in protecting salmon for future generations. In view of the rapidly declining Atlantic salmon population catch-and-release should have been implemented on all rivers apart from northern Quebec.

In 2017 all salmon, large and small, had to be released on the Malbaie (Gaspé Peninsula), Pigou, Bouleau, Magpie, Coacoachou, Nétagamiou, Little Mecatina and Véco rivers. Only young salmon could be retained on 51 rivers, and limited retention of large salmon was allowed on 19 rivers.

== See also ==
- Sault Plat River, flows into the Gulf of St. Lawrence water in the municipality of Rivière-au-Tonnerre
- Map of Quebec's 111 salmon rivers, Gouvernement du Québec, Canada, 2023

== Notes ==
- Portrait du bassin versant au Bouleau (PDF) (in French), OBV Duplessis
- Randall, Robert G.; Power, Geoffrey (June 1979), "Atlantic salmon (Salmo salar) of the Pigou and Bouleau Rivers, Quebec", Environmental Biology of Fishes, 4 (2): 179–184, doi:10.1007/BF00005451
