= Pakuashipi =

Pakuashipi Pakua Shipu
- Indigenous settlement
- Location within Quebec
- Coordinates: 51°14′N 58°40′W
- Country: Canada
- Province: Quebec
- Region: Côte-Nord
- RCM: Le Golfe-du-Saint-Laurent
- Established: 1971

Government
  - Chief: Guy Mestenapeo
  - Federal riding: Côte-Nord—Kawawachikamach—Nitassinan
  - Prov. riding: Duplessis

Area
  - Land: 3.93 km^{2} (1.52 sq mi)

Population (2016)
  - Total: 237
  - Density: 60.3/km^{2} (156/sq mi)
  - Change (2016–11): ▼24.0%
  - Dwellings: 90
- Time zone: UTC−04:00 (AST)
- Postal Code: G0G 2R0
- Area codes: 418 and 581

Pakuashipi (Pakua Shipi, or Pakua Shipu in Innu-aimun and St-Augustin Indian Settlement) is an Innu community in the Canadian province of Quebec, located on the north shore of the Gulf of Saint Lawrence in the Côte-Nord region. It is on the western shore of the mouth of the Saint-Augustin River, opposite the settlement of Saint-Augustin. It is not an Indian reserve, but an Indian settlement within the Municipality of Saint-Augustin, occupied by the Innu band of Pakua Shipi. Although they hold no formal legal title to the land at this time, negotiations are still ongoing to determine their indigenous rights.

The community is serviced by a health centre, a community centre, a church, a school, a community store, a youth centre, a community radio station, an inn, municipal water and sewer system, fire station, and an indigenous police force.

Pakuashipi is the Innu name of the Saint-Augustin River and means "shallow river", from pakua ("drained" or "dried up") and shipi ("river"). The inhabitants of this settlement are identified by other Innu groups as the Pakua-shipiunnuat, and are considered the most traditional, the most conservative Innu band, in terms of both culture and language.

== History ==
The area was originally home to nomadic Innu and Inuit tribes. Most of them, however, were displaced once Europeans began to exploit the area. In July 1949, the Government of Quebec offered to the Innu population land with an area of 1.3 ha (3.2 acres) in order to create a reserve. But this was refused by the Government of Canada who deemed its population too small to justify such a decision. In the early 1960s, in order to provide essential services, the federal government decided to incorporate the Saint-Augustin group with the band at La Romaine reserve and relocated them there. But during the night, in a storm, the group returned to their ancestral land.

On June 4, 1971, the Quebec Ministry of Lands and Forests authorized the Government of Canada to build houses for the First Nations people of Saint Augustin on the current site. On July 27, 1987, the Saint Augustin Band changed its name to "Pakua Shipi Montagnais Band".

== Demographics ==
As of July 2021, the band had a registered population of 401 people. The number of private dwellings occupied by usual residents is 65 out of a total of 90. As of the 2016 Canadian census mother tongues spoken are as follows:

- English as first language: 0.0%
- French as first language: 6.4%
- English and French as first language: 0%
- Innu-aimun: 87.28%
- Other responses: 6.4%

Population trend (1991 - 2016):

- Population in 2016: 237 −24.0
- Population in 2011: 312 +8.0%
- Population in 2006: 289 +26.8%
- Population in 2001: 228 −5.8%
- Population in 1996: 242 +14.7%
- Population in 1991: 211

== Education ==
There is only one school on the settlement, École Pakuashipish, that provides pre-Kindergarten to Secondary grade 4, and had an enrolment of 88 students in 2008-2009.
