= Ive Simard =

Ive Simrad
- Born: c. 1946
- Occupations: Tanguero, choreographer, instructor

Ive Simard (born c. 1946) was a Canadian and US tanguero, choreographer, and instructor of Argentine tango. He opened his own tango school El Mundo del Tango in San Diego, California in 1993. He was holding degrees in dance from both the University of Quebec and the Imperial Society of Dancing, in the United Kingdom and he was an international open champion in Ballroom and Latin Divisions in 1977, 1978, and 1979 and as international judge accredited with the International Council of Ballroom Dance.

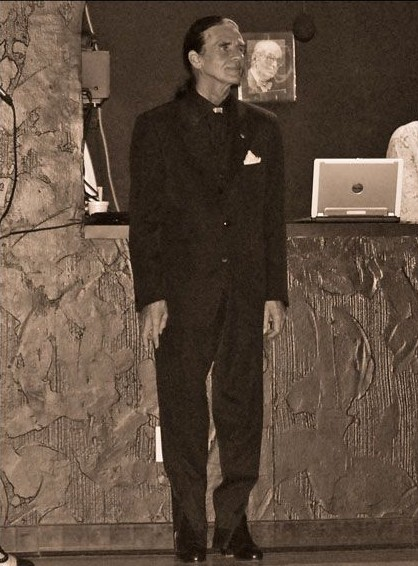
Ive Simard at El Mundo del Tango. San Diego, California, 2007.

He was born and raised in the city of Quebec, Canada. His mother was Carmel Bedaro (Simard). One of his teachers, since 1960, was Juan Carlos Copes. At the age of 15 he started to be a professional dancer. He was influenced by the Indian mystic Sri Nisargadatta Maharaj whose book "I Am That" was translated to English in 1973. From 1985 to 1992 Ive Simard and his wife Ludmilla Anna Simard worked on cruise ships producing and performing over 300 shows a year. Along with his wife, he opened his own tango school, El Mundo del Tango, in San Diego, California in 1993.

In 1994 Simard was giving some tango classes at a place run by Bassam Shamma. In 1996, El Mundo Del Tango moved into a facility of 4000 square feet on 6904 Miramar Road in San Diego. El Mundo Del Tango Academy ran regular classes from strict beginner to intermediate and advanced levels, as well as professional classes and workshops. In 2008 El Mundo del Tango was moved to the new facility "Tango del Rey" in San Diego. He trained and mentored professional and amateur dancers in Tango, Ballroom, Classical Ballet, Jazz, and Olympic Skating throughout the world including Canada, England, Argentina, the former Soviet Union, Turkey, and Greece.

Simard had plans to create the world's first tango university, which would be located in a circular mall that would have 24 boutiques, all related to tango, in the front. The university would be in the back, all on one floor, with different departments. The plan was to create a reconstitution of Buenos Aires, and anyone who stepped into the mall would forget they were in San Diego.

A resolution was passed in 2002 in the California Legislature Assembly recognizing Simard's service to the people of the State of California. He became a US citizen on March 19, 2004.
