= Musquaro River =

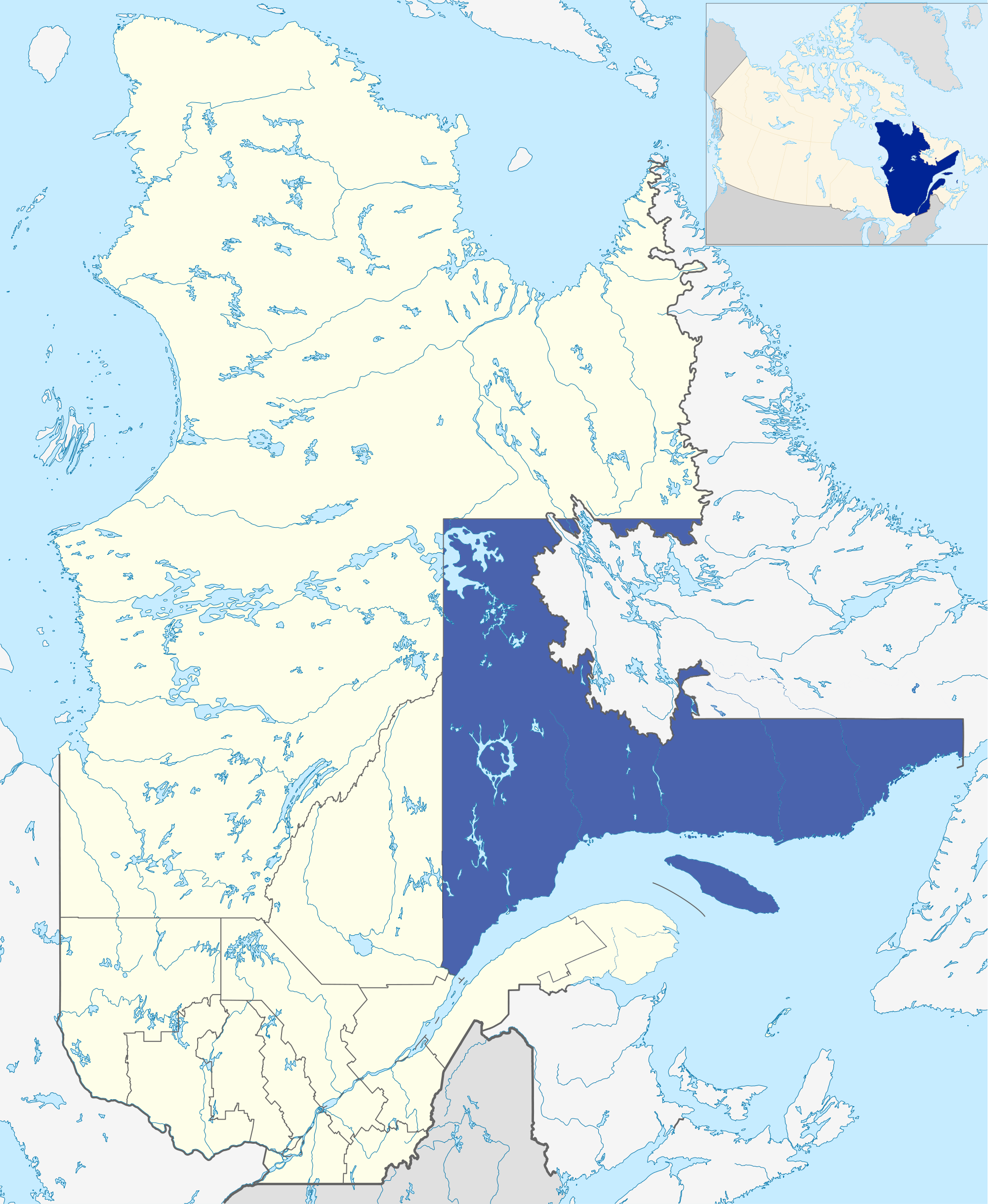
- Administrative region of Côte-Nord in relation to Quebec.

Location
- Country: Canada
- Province: Quebec
- Region: Côte-Nord

Physical characteristics
- Mouth: Gulf of Saint Lawrence
  - location: Kegaska, Quebec, Côte-Nord, Quebec, Canada
  - coordinates: 50°12′29″N 61°03′41″W
  - elevation: 0 m (0 ft)
- Length: 150 km (93 mi)

The River Musquaro flows south in the municipality of Côte-Nord-du-Golfe-du-Saint-Laurent, in the Le Golfe-du-Saint-Laurent Regional County Municipality, in the administrative region of Côte-Nord (North-Shore), in Quebec, in Canada.

== Geography ==
The river basin covers 3,638 square kilometres (1,405 sq mi). It lies between the basins of the Kegaska River to the west and the Musquanousse River to the east. With a length of about 150 kilometres (93 mi), the Musquaro river rises a few miles east of Lake Doré, and 15 kilometres (9 mi) southwest of Olomane West River. Zigzagging south, the river creates some lakes that it passes through.

The main body of water feeding the Musquaro river is the Musquaro Lake including a bay in the south where is its mouth, which is about 32.5 kilometres (20.2 mi) in a direct line northeast of the village of Kebaska. This lake is 6.4 kilometres (4 mi) north of Lake Musquanousse, which discharges into the river Musquanousse. The mouth of the river Musquanousse is 8 kilometres (5 mi) east of the mouth of the river Musquaro.

== Course ==
The two rivers (Musquaro and Musquanousse) flow almost in parallel. Musquaro the river begins at the outlet of Musquaro Lake; water then flows south and southwest from the Pointe de la Fourche. Then, heading south, it crosses Grand Lake and Lake Folding Camp John and continues south-east across the lake Bonenfant.

On the following segments of its path, the river passes at "Pointe à la Loutre" (Musquaro Otter Point), crosses the "Bay of the third fall", crosses the "île des Rats Musqués" (Muskrats Island), crosses the "Baie du Français" (Bay of French Island) and crosses the "île de la Ligne du Télégraphe" (line of Telegraph Island). The river empties into the Bay Kauahinekaut, near Island Menahkunakat, Kahakaut and Mantuh, of the Washicoutai archipelago. This bay is between Tip Musquaro (west) and Tip Chicoutal (east).

== Trading post ==
Musquaro Township, located about 160 kilometres (99 mi) east of Havre-Saint-Pierre, is crossed by the river Musquaro. The ghost hamlet Musquaro is at the mouth of the river (between La Romaine and Kegaska), on the site of an old trading post established around 1710 by the French. A second counter fur trade would be replaced in 1770.

In 1780, the equivalent of the territory of Canton Musquaro was granted to the Company of Quebec Labrador. In 1803, the company transferred its operations rights to the Northwest Company. The Hudson's Bay Company acquires the rights in 1821; then definitely give up the post in 1925. Canton Musquaro (township) was proclaimed in 1869 by the Government of Quebec.

Fish abound in the Musquaro River. The watershed is rich in wildfowl and furs animals.

== Toponymy ==
The name "River Musquaro" was formalized on December 5, 1968, at the bank of place names in the Commission de toponymie du Quebec (Geographical Names Board of Quebec)

== See also ==
- Le Golfe-du-Saint-Laurent Regional County Municipality,
- Côte-Nord-du-Golfe-du-Saint-Laurent, Quebec, a municipality
- Côte-Nord (North-Shore), an administrative region of Québec, in Canada
- List of rivers of Quebec
