= Saint-Augustin, Côte-Nord, Quebec =

Saint-Augustin
- Municipality
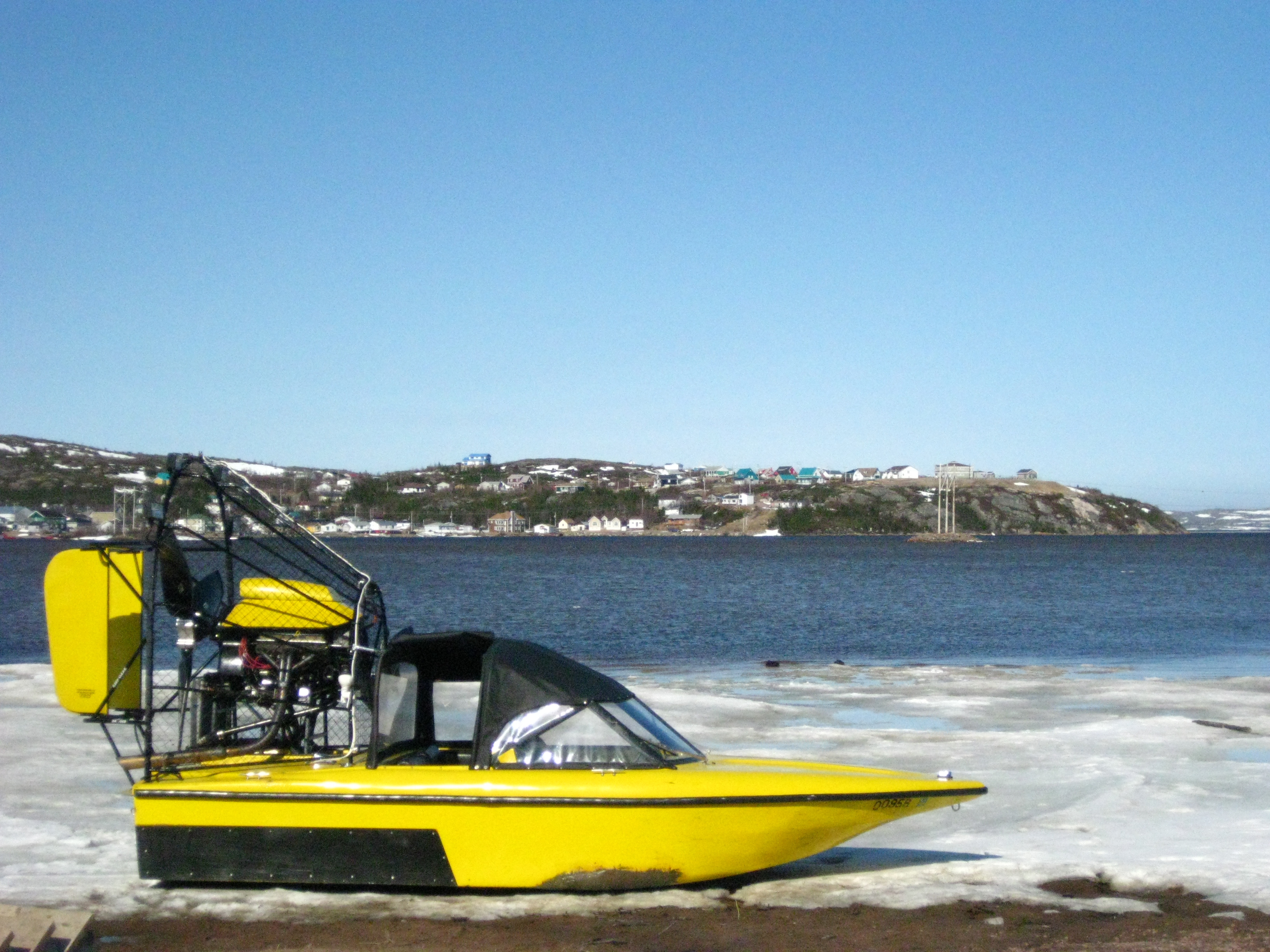

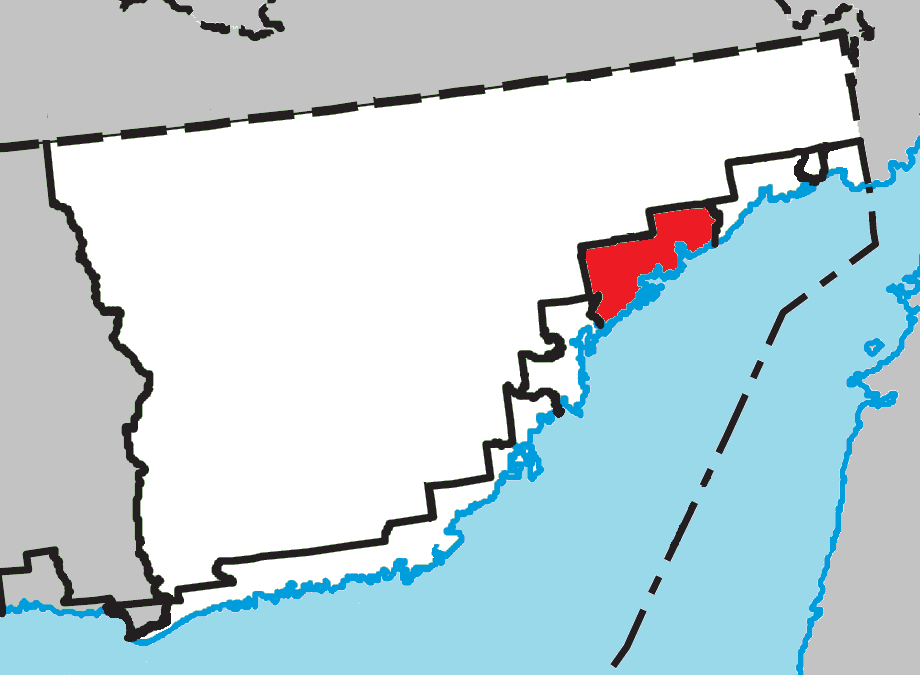
- Location within Le Golfe-du-Saint-Laurent RCM

- Location in Côte-Nord Region of Quebec
- Coordinates: 51°13′N 58°39′W
- Country: Canada
- Province: Quebec
- Region: Côte-Nord
- RCM: Le Golfe-du-Saint-Laurent
- Constituted: January 1, 1993

Government
  - Mayor: Gladys Driscoll Martin
  - Federal riding: Côte-Nord—Kawawachikamach—Nitassinan
  - Prov. riding: Duplessis

Area
  - Total: 2,087.24 km^{2} (805.89 sq mi)
  - Land: 1,137.68 km^{2} (439.26 sq mi)

Population (2021)
  - Total: 425
  - Density: 0.4/km^{2} (1.0/sq mi)
  - Pop (2016–21): ▼4.5%
  - Dwellings: 228
- Time zone: UTC−04:00 (AST)
- Postal code(s): G0G 2R0
- Area codes: 418 and 581
- Highways: No major routes
- Website: www.saintaugustin.ca

Saint-Augustin (French pronunciation: [sɛ̃t‿oɡystɛ̃]) is a municipality and settlement in Le Golfe-du-Saint-Laurent Regional County Municipality in the Côte-Nord region of Quebec, Canada, known by its large English-speaking population as St. Augustine. Its territory stretches along the Gulf of Saint Lawrence, whereas the settlement itself is located on a peninsula in the Saint Augustin Bay at the mouth of the Saint-Augustin River. On the opposite shore of this river is the Innu settlement of Pakuashipi.

The majority of its inhabitants are Métis, descendants of Inuit and Europeans, many of whom still practice subsistence activities such as hunting, fishing, wood cutting, trapping and wild berry gathering, using both traditional and modern technologies.

== History ==
The area was originally inhabited by Innu and Inuit tribes, who were mostly displaced once Europeans began to exploit the area. In the late 17th century, a French post may have been established on Vieux Poste Island. Circa 1720, a trading post was established around which the settlement formed. It was first identified as Saint-Augustin–Saguenay, named after Augustin le Gardeur de Courtemanche (1663–1717) who in 1702 was granted the land concession "from the river called Kegaska up to the one named Kesesakion" for a period of 10 years and who was the King's Commander of the Labrador coast in 1714.

The place experienced a slow growth until the lower North Shore was opened to settlement circa 1820, attracting English, American, Quebec, and Newfoundland fishing families to its rich stocks of seal, salmon and cod. They mixed with the remaining indigenous people, and their descendants, the Métis, occupied at one point some 40 different fishing communities on the shores of the area's numerous islands and bays, including Spoon Cove, Anse du Portage, Havre Saint-Augustin, and Ile Saint-Augustin. In 1870, the trading post, then owned by the Hudson's Bay Company, was rebuilt and became the site of thriving hunting, fishing, and trading business. In 1893, its post office opened.

By 1986, Saint-Augustin had 833 inhabitants. It separated from the Municipality of Côte-Nord-du-Golfe-du-Saint-Laurent and was incorporated as the Municipality of Saint-Augustin in 1992, becoming effective on January 1, 1993.

== Demographics ==
Canada census – Saint-Augustin community profile

	2021	2016	2011
Population	425 (-4.5% from 2016)	445 (-6.9% from 2011)	478 (-20.2% from 2006)
Land area	1,137.68 km^{2} (439.26 sq mi)	1,252.77 km^{2} (483.70 sq mi)	1,254.28 km^{2} (484.28 sq mi)
Population density	0.4/km^{2} (1.0/sq mi)	0.4/km^{2} (1.0/sq mi)	0.4/km^{2} (1.0/sq mi)
Median age	54.8 (M: 53.6, F: 55.6)	52.1 (M: 51.8, F: 52.5)	45.8 (M: 45.7, F: 45.9)
Private dwellings	228 (total) 198 (occupied)	222 (total) 198 (occupied)	243 (total)
Median household income	$70,500	$59,264	$.N/A

Notes: 2011 income data for this area has been suppressed for data quality or confidentiality reasons.
References: 2021 2016 2011

Historical Census Data – Saint-Augustin, Côte-Nord, Quebec

Year	Pop.	±%
1991	760	—
1996	683	−10.1%
2001	626	−8.3%
2006	599	−4.3%

Year	Pop.	±%
2011	478	−20.2%
2016	445	−6.9%
2021	425	−4.5%

Source: Statistics Canada

=== Language ===
Canada Census Mother Tongue – Saint-Augustin, Côte-Nord, Quebec
Census	Total	French			English			French & English			Other		
Year	Responses	Count	Trend	Pop %	Count	Trend	Pop %	Count	Trend	Pop %	Count	Trend	Pop %
2011	470	10	▼80.0%	2.13%	455	▼16.5%	96.81%	0	0.0%	0.00%	5	▲ n/a%	1.06%
2006	595	50	▼28.6%	8.40%	545	▼1.80%	91.60%	0	0.0%	0.00%	0	0.0%	0.00%
2001	625	70	▲64.3%	11.2%	555	▼14.6%	88.8%	0	0.0%	0.00%	0	▼10.0%	0.00%
1996	685	25	n/a	3.65%	650	n/a	94.89%	0	n/a	0.00%	10	n/a	1.46%

== Local government ==
List of former mayors:

- Camille Fequet (...–2009)
- John Albana Bursey (2009–2011)
- Randy Maurice ( 2011-2012)
- Trudy Shattler (2012-2014)
- Glen McKinnon (2014-2017)
- Gladys Driscoll Martin (2017–present)

== See also ==
- List of anglophone communities in Quebec
- List of municipalities in Quebec
