= Kegaska =

- Unconstituted locality
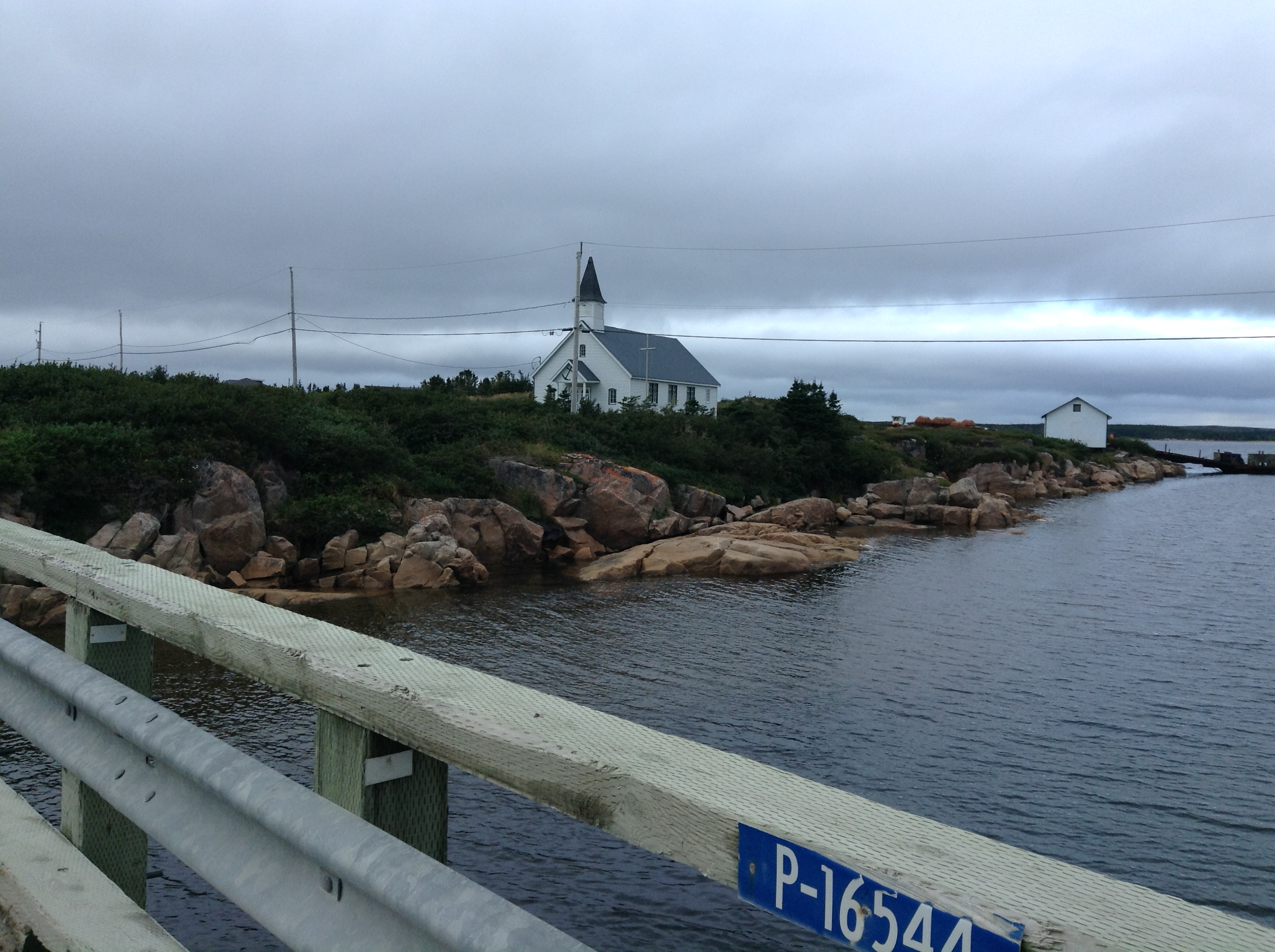

- Location within Quebec
- Coordinates: 50°11′01″N 61°16′21″W
- Country: Canada
- Province: Quebec
- Region: Côte-Nord
- RCM: Le Golfe-du-Saint-Laurent
- Municipality: Côte-Nord-du-Golfe-du-Saint-Laurent

Government
  - Federal riding: Côte-Nord—Kawawachikamach—Nitassinan
  - Prov. riding: Duplessis

Area
  - Land: 4.10 km^{2} (1.58 sq mi)

Population (2011)
  - Total: 138
  - Density: 33.7/km^{2} (87/sq mi)
  - Change (2006–11): ▲1.5%
  - Dwellings: 68
- Time zone: UTC−04:00 (AST)
- Postal code(s): G0G 1S0
- Area codes: 418 and 581

Kegaska (also Kegashka) is a locality in the Côte-Nord region of eastern Quebec, Canada, and part of the municipality of Côte-Nord-du-Golfe-du-Saint-Laurent. Kegaska is the easternmost point in the Côte-Nord region of Quebec, Canada to be reachable by road without passing through Newfoundland and Labrador. In the 2011 Canadian census, the locality had a population of 138. Quebec Route 138 reached the community on September 26, 2013, with the inauguration of a bridge across the Natashquan River.

It is an unconstituted locality (as defined by Statistics Canada in the Canada 2011 Census) within the municipality of Côte-Nord-du-Golfe-du-Saint-Laurent.

== Geography ==
Kegaska village is located about 60 km (40 miles) east of the town of Natashquan and 47 km (30 miles) (in direct line) west of the town of La Romaine. Kegaska is built on a point of land between two bays (Muddy Bay and Kegaska Bay). Located opposite of the village, the Black Isle (Île Noire, in French) is connected to the mainland by a bridge. This island has an old lighthouse used for navigation.

Natashquan River forms the western boundary of the municipality of Côte-Nord-du-Golfe-du-Saint-Laurent. Between that river and the village of Kegaska, we find there (from West to East):

- several small rivers that empty into the Gulf of St. Lawrence: de l'Étang (Pond), Long, Clay, Sam, Kegaska and Belley;
- the "Pointe du Vieux Poste" (Tip of Old post), Cape Tiennot (Mont Joli is in back), Mistanekau beach, Ehkuahiniu rocks, Kegaska Harbour (havre Kegaska, in French), Muddy Cove and Kippin islands.

The east side, between the Kegaska village and the Musquaro River, there is situated (from West to East):

- Kegaska Bay, Mount Hatsheuiat Tshehkahkau, le Havre Mistassini (harbourg), the Pepihtnahu bay and the tip Musquaro (located on the west side of the mouth of the river Musquaro);
- a series of islands up to 4 km (2 1/2 miles) away from the mainland: Island Black, Green Tshinahat, Parsons, Kakatshihipinukut, Uhatshistsh, Ketshinukuteuat, Tshiahkuehihat, Menahkunakat and islands kahakaut;
- the area waterfowl gathering of part-Chicoutai Kégaska.

The lake Kegaska (length of 11.7 km; 7 1/4 miles) is located 16 km (10 miles) northwest of the town of Kegaska and its mouth is in the south of the lake. It empties into the Kegaska river (20 km; 12 miles long) flowing at first on 7.7 km (4 3/4 miles) to the southwest; and 5.3 km (3 1/4 miles) to the east; and finally a segment of 7 km (4 1/4 miles) to the south, ending in a bay of the Gulf of St. Lawrence, at 7.2 km (4 1/2 miles) west of the village of Kegaska.

Kegaska village is the current eastern end of an over-1400 km (870 mile) segment of route 138 which starts south of Montreal at the Quebec-New York State border. The road reached the village on September 26, 2013, following the inauguration of a bridge across the Natashquan River. It is currently not possible to drive beyond Kegaska by road; the 450 kilometres (280 mi) between Kegaska and Old Fort (Vieux-Fort) is accessible by a weekly coastal ferry which runs from Rimouski and stops in Kegaska, by snowmobile, or a 2400 km (1500 mile) land detour via Quebec Route 389 and the Trans-Labrador Highway.

== Toponymy ==
Its name derives from the Innu word quegasca, first recorded on Franquelin's map of 1685. This place name is also used to refer to a river, a lake, an island, a haven, a tip, a bay and a canton (township).

== History ==
In 1831, Kegaska was the site of a Hudson's Bay Company trading post, but the actual settlement was formed in 1852 when Acadian settlers came from the Magdalen Islands. They abandoned the place in 1871-1873 to settle at Betchewun (now Betchouane between Havre-Saint-Pierre and Baie-Johan-Beetz) and were replaced by Newfoundland fishermen, almost all of Irish origin. They in turn left around 1887-1888, leaving the place completely deserted by 1890. Yet in 1898, a few families relocated from Perth, Ontario, whose descendants now populate the area.

At the end of the 19th century, predominantly English-speaking settlers came from the Anticosti Island to settle in Kegaska.

Victor-Alphonse Huard wrote this description in 1897 of the region: At Kégashka begins a long trail of islands, which continues to near the entrance to the Strait of Belle Isle. There are large, but most are only islands that crowd in several rows along the coast and sometimes up to twelve or fifteen miles offshore. Listed on the map this dust accumulated islands to the north coast, it looks like the scum of the Gulf that the fury of the winds from the southwest would have rejected his rivage.

In 1976, Le Brion, a cargo ship from Magdalen Islands wrecked on a shoal near Kegaska. The remains of the wreck are still visible from the village.

== Economy ==
Fishing, especially the crab industry, serves as one of the main community's primary economic activities.

== Demographics ==
In the 2021 Census of Population conducted by Statistics Canada, Kegaska had a population of 124 living in 58 of its 72 total private dwellings, a change of 30.5% from its 2016 population of 95. With a land area of 3.06 km^{2} (1.18 sq mi), it had a population density of 40.5/km^{2} (105.0/sq mi) in 2021.

== Education ==
Commission scolaire du Littoral operates Kegaska School (anglophone).

== See also ==
- Côte-Nord-du-Golfe-du-Saint-Laurent (regional county municipality)
- Côte-Nord, administrative region of Quebec
