= Le Golfe-du-Saint-Laurent Regional County Municipality =

Le Golfe-du-Saint-Laurent
- Regional county municipality
- Coordinates: 50°29′N 59°37′W
- Country: Canada
- Province: Quebec
- Region: Côte-Nord
- Effective: July 7, 2010
- County seat: Côte-Nord-du- Golfe-du-St-Laurent

Government
  - Type: Prefecture
  - Prefect: Daren Jones

Area
  - Total: 48,146.88 km^{2} (18,589.61 sq mi)
  - Land: 40,686.75 km^{2} (15,709.24 sq mi)

Population (2021)
  - Total: 3,382
  - Density: 0.083/km^{2} (0.21/sq mi)
  - Pop (2016-21): ▼6.7%
  - Dwellings: 1,722
- Area codes: 418 and 581
- Website: mrcgsl.ca

Le Golfe-du-Saint-Laurent (French pronunciation: [lə ɡɔlf dy sɛ̃ lɔʁɑ̃]) is a regional county municipality in the Côte-Nord region of far-eastern Quebec, Canada. It includes all communities along the Gulf of Saint Lawrence between the Natashquan River and the Newfoundland and Labrador border.

It has a total area of 48,146.88 square kilometres (18,589.61 sq mi) according to Quebec's Ministère des Affaires municipales, des Régions et de l'Occupation du territoire (which includes coastal, lake, and river water territory), and a land area of 40,686.75 square kilometres (15,709.24 sq mi) according to Statistics Canada. The population from the 2021 Canadian census was 3,382.

Le Golfe-du-Saint-Laurent and the neighbouring Minganie Regional County Municipality are grouped into the single census division of Minganie–Le Golfe-du-Saint-Laurent (known as Minganie–Basse-Côte-Nord before 2010). The combined population at the 2021 census was 9,849.

Le Golfe-du-Saint-Laurent Regional County Municipality was created in July 2010, replacing Basse-Côte-Nord, which was a territory equivalent to a regional county municipality. It is territorially much larger than Basse-Côte-Nord was, because at the time of its creation it received the (uninhabited) Petit-Mécatina unorganized territory in a transfer from Minganie Regional County Municipality.

Le Golfe-du-Saint-Laurent Regional County Municipality is characterized by the absence of road connections between the villages that are spread out along its 375 kilometres (233 mi) shoreline of the gulf. Except for Blanc-Sablon, all communities are only accessible by boat or plane, although Quebec Route 138 is being planned to extend all along the coast. Since the early 1990s, the region's commercial fishing industry has seen a steep decline, but a tourism industry is being developed to promote hunting and fishing outfitters, among other activities.

== Subdivisions ==
There are 6 subdivisions and one native reserve within the RCM:

Municipalities

- Blanc-Sablon

(Blanc-Sablon, Lourdes-de-Blanc-Sablon, and Brador)

- Bonne-Espérance

(Rivière-Saint-Paul, Middle Bay, and Vieux-Fort)

- Côte-Nord-du-Golfe-du-Saint-Laurent

(Chevery, Kegashka, Harrington Harbour, and Tête-à-la-Baleine)

- Gros-Mécatina

(La Tabatière and Mutton Bay)

- Saint-Augustin

Unorganized territories

- Petit-Mécatina

Native Reserves
(not associated with RCM)

- La Romaine
- Pakuashipi

== Demographics ==
Historical census populations – Le Golfe-du-Saint-Laurent RCM
Year	Pop.	±%
2011	3,798	—
2016	3,545	−6.7%
2021	3,382	−4.6%
Excluding La Romaine and Pakuashipi reserves. Source: Statistics Canada

== Transportation ==
=== Access Routes ===
Highways and numbered routes that run through the municipality, including external routes that start or finish at the county border:

- Autoroutes
  - None
- Principal Highways
  - R-138
- Secondary Highways
  - None
- External Routes
  - Route 510

== River basins ==
There are a number of large rivers that flow in a generally north–south direction through Le Golfe-du-Saint-Laurent to enter the Gulf. Near the coast the river basins tend to narrow in towards the river mouth, and between their mouths are areas that drain into the Gulf through smaller streams. From west to east, the larger river basins, which may cover parts of Labrador or Minganie, are:

River	Basin size		Mouth coordinates	Map link
River	km^{2}	sq. mile	Mouth coordinates	Map link
Kegaska	721	278	50.1791667°N 61.3530556°W	EKVRF
Musquaro	3,638	1,405	50.2080556°N 61.0613889°W	EHJBL
Musquanousse	338	131	50.2111111°N 60.9627778°W	EHJBE
Washicoutai	1,558	602	50.2505556°N 60.8144444°W	EIMJY
Olomane	5,426	2,095	50.2333333°N 60.6388889°W	EHLXL
Coacoachou	408	158	50.2775°N 60.2944444°W	EFYLS
Étamamiou	3,014	1,164	50.2808333°N 59.9788889°W	EGHQJ
Nétagamiou	229	88	50.4694444°N 59.6072222°W	EHJYJ
Little Mécatina	19,590	7,560	50.6566667°N 59.4294444°W	EHPVV
Gros Mécatina	1,054	407	50.7683333°N 59.0944444°W	EGOUH
Véco	1,029	397	50.9980556°N 58.9813889°W	EIKOR
Kécarpoui	696	269	51.0619444°N 58.8338889°W	EGVDL
Saint-Augustin	9,892	3,819	51.2177778°N 58.6355556°W	EHYVQ
Coxipi	1,672	646	51.3044444°N 58.4808333°W	EGAGW
Chécatica	193	75	51.3869444°N 58.2797222°W	EFWRJ
Napetipi	1,262	487	51.3386111°N 58.1311111°W	EHJJP
Saint-Paul	7,158	2,764	51.4694444°N 57.7013889°W	EIASD
Belles Amours	304	117	51.4819444°N 57.4563889°W	EFMPJ
Brador	206	80	51.505°N 57.2472222°W	EFQKI

== See also ==
- List of regional county municipalities and equivalent territories in Quebec
