= Nutashkuan =

Nutashkuan Natashquan
- First Nations reserve
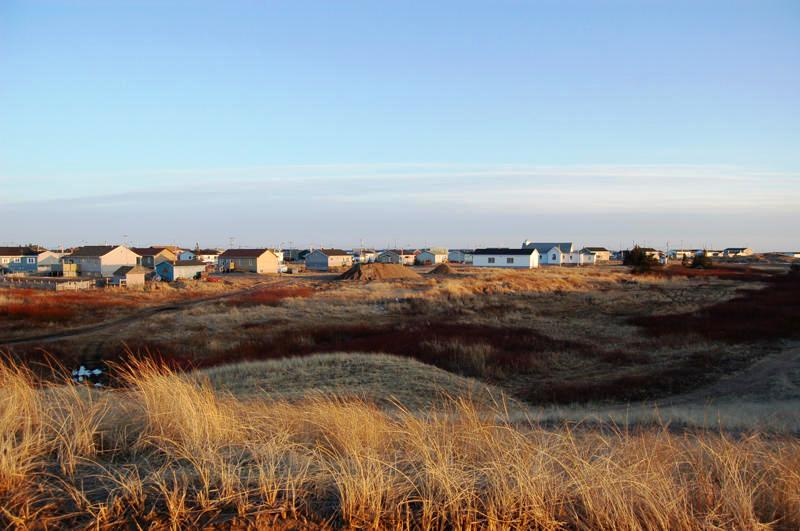

- Location in the Côte-Nord region
- Coordinates: 50°08′N 61°48′W
- Country: Canada
- Province: Quebec
- Region: Côte-Nord
- Regional county: none
- Formed: 1953

Government
  - Chief: Réal Tettaut
  - Federal riding: Côte-Nord—Kawawachikamach—Nitassinan
  - Provincial riding: Duplessis

Area
  - Total: 1.19 km^{2} (0.46 sq mi)
  - Land: 1.35 km^{2} (0.52 sq mi)
- There is an apparent discrepancy between 2 authoritative sources.

Population (2021)
  - Total: 915
  - Density: 678.5/km^{2} (1,757/sq mi)
- Time zone: UTC−05:00 (Within the AST legislated time zone boundary but observes EST)
  - Summer (DST): UTC−04:00 (EDT)
- Postal Code: G0G 2E0
- Area codes: 418 and 581

Nutashkuan (INAC) or Natashquan (CGNDB) (sometimes Natashquan 1) is a First Nations reserve in the Canadian province of Quebec, belonging to the Première Nation des Innus de Nutashkuan band. The reserve is located on the north shore of the Gulf of St. Lawrence at the mouth of the Natashquan River, 336 km (209 mi) east of Sept-Îles and has been accessible by Route 138 since 1996.

The reserve should not be confused with the adjacent but distinct township of Natashquan just to the north and east.

The community is serviced by a nursing station, community radio station, municipal water and sewer system, fire station, and an aboriginal police force.

The site was mapped in 1684 by Louis Jolliet who called it Noutascoüan. It was subsequently spelled as Nontascouanne (1734), Natasquan (1831), Nataskwan (1844), Natashkwan (1846), Natosquan (1857), Nataskouan (1858), and taking its current form, Natashquan, circa 1895. This name, spelled Nutahkuant or Nutashkuan in the contemporary Innu language, is usually translated as "where the black bear is taken" or "where one hunts for bear."

== History ==
Historically, the nomadic Innu lived on their hunting grounds of the interior during the winter and would move to the coast in the summer for salmon fishing and seal hunting. From as early as 1710, a trading post was established on the left (south) bank of the Natashquan River and later on the opposite bank to conduct fur trade with the indigenous. They gathered at the post during their annual migration and began to settle there permanently. The post was acquired by the Hudson's Bay Company in the middle of the 19th century, but abandoned circa 1914 due to lack of profitability.

In 1909, the first land survey was conducted for the creation of a reserve. In 1952, the first 20.5 acres (83,000 m^{2}) of land were bought by the Government of Canada and transferred for the use by the Innu on 31 March 1953. The reserve was incrementally enlarged in 1954, 1970, and 1993.

== Demographics ==
As of May 2022, the band counted 1,212 members, of which 1,095 persons lived on the reserve.

In the 2021 Canadian census, there were 228 private dwellings that are occupied by usual residents, out of a total of 234.

The mother tongue of the residents is (2021):

- English as first language: 0%
- French as first language: 0.5%
- Innu-aimun as first language: 97.8%
- French and other language: 1.1%

Historical census populations – Nutashkuan

Year	Pop.	±%
1976	365	—
1981	415	+13.7%
1986	491	+18.3%
1991	598	+21.8%
1996	639	+6.9%

Year	Pop.	±%
2001	761	+19.1%
2006	810	+6.4%
2011	841	+3.8%
2016	835	−0.7%
2021	915	+9.6%

Source: Statistics Canada

== Climate ==
Nutashkuan has a subarctic climate (Dfc), typical of communities along the Gulf of St. Lawrence. Summers are mild and rainy, with mild days and cool nights. Winters are cold with extremely heavy annual snowfall, averaging 356.3 cm (140.3 in). Nutashkuan receives around 1,900 hours of sunshine per year.

Climate data for Natashquan Airport
Month	Jan	Feb	Mar	Apr	May	Jun	Jul	Aug	Sep	Oct	Nov	Dec	Year
Record high humidex	8.1	5.8	10.0	16.7	25.2	30.2	35.9	32.9	31.2	20.6	14.8	8.7	35.9
Record high °C (°F)	8.2 (46.8)	6.7 (44.1)	12.8 (55.0)	17.8 (64.0)	23.9 (75.0)	26.4 (79.5)	28.9 (84.0)	28.3 (82.9)	26.1 (79.0)	19.4 (66.9)	14.4 (57.9)	9.4 (48.9)	28.9 (84.0)
Mean daily maximum °C (°F)	−8.0 (17.6)	−7.2 (19.0)	−2.2 (28.0)	3.4 (38.1)	9.7 (49.5)	15.0 (59.0)	18.5 (65.3)	18.2 (64.8)	14.2 (57.6)	8.1 (46.6)	1.9 (35.4)	−4.3 (24.3)	5.6 (42.1)
Daily mean °C (°F)	−13.5 (7.7)	−12.7 (9.1)	−7.1 (19.2)	−0.3 (31.5)	5.5 (41.9)	10.7 (51.3)	14.4 (57.9)	14.1 (57.4)	10.0 (50.0)	4.2 (39.6)	−1.9 (28.6)	−9.0 (15.8)	1.2 (34.2)
Mean daily minimum °C (°F)	−19.0 (−2.2)	−18.1 (−0.6)	−12.0 (10.4)	−3.9 (25.0)	1.3 (34.3)	6.3 (43.3)	10.3 (50.5)	9.9 (49.8)	5.7 (42.3)	0.3 (32.5)	−5.6 (21.9)	−13.7 (7.3)	−3.2 (26.2)
Record low °C (°F)	−42.8 (−45.0)	−37.2 (−35.0)	−33.7 (−28.7)	−22.5 (−8.5)	−12.8 (9.0)	−3.9 (25.0)	1.1 (34.0)	−1.1 (30.0)	−7.8 (18.0)	−15.0 (5.0)	−25.6 (−14.1)	−35.0 (−31.0)	−42.8 (−45.0)
Record low wind chill	−52.3	−47.9	−42.9	−31.3	−17.9	−15.0	0.9	−3.4	−7.3	−19.6	−30.4	−46.2	−52.3
Average precipitation mm (inches)	95.7 (3.77)	67.4 (2.65)	95.2 (3.75)	81.7 (3.22)	88.6 (3.49)	86.2 (3.39)	99.0 (3.90)	96.0 (3.78)	100.5 (3.96)	107.9 (4.25)	106.4 (4.19)	105.3 (4.15)	1,129.8 (44.48)
Average rainfall mm (inches)	18.8 (0.74)	12.5 (0.49)	27.7 (1.09)	47.2 (1.86)	83.6 (3.29)	86.2 (3.39)	99.0 (3.90)	97.1 (3.82)	100.4 (3.95)	102.2 (4.02)	70.5 (2.78)	29.4 (1.16)	774.5 (30.49)
Average snowfall cm (inches)	79.1 (31.1)	55.8 (22.0)	66.9 (26.3)	33.3 (13.1)	4.5 (1.8)	0.0 (0.0)	0.0 (0.0)	0.0 (0.0)	0.0 (0.0)	5.5 (2.2)	34.4 (13.5)	76.8 (30.2)	356.3 (140.3)
Average precipitation days (≥ 0.2 mm)	19.1	15.8	15.7	14.5	13.9	13.0	14.3	13.2	14.3	15.2	15.1	17.7	181.9
Average rainy days (≥ 0.2 mm)	2.5	2.4	4.5	8.5	13.2	13.0	14.3	13.2	14.3	14.4	9.0	4.4	113.8
Average snowy days (≥ 0.2 cm)	18.4	14.9	13.6	9.3	1.8	0.0	0.0	0.0	0.0	2.2	9.2	16.1	85.6
Average relative humidity (%) (at 06:00 / 15:00 LST)	73.3	73.4	77.4	82.2	84.1	85.2	90.7	92.7	91.5	87.1	82.7	76.7	83.1
Average afternoon relative humidity (%) (at 06:00 / 15:00 LST)	68.8	67.6	70.4	73.3	70.5	71.5	76.1	77.1	75.6	73.1	73.2	71.9	72.4
Mean monthly sunshine hours	104.7	125.3	148.2	161.4	214.2	219.3	236.8	228.2	166.0	125.4	96.8	87.2	1,913.4
Percentage possible sunshine	39.4	44.2	40.3	39.1	44.8	44.8	48.0	50.8	43.7	37.5	35.5	34.6	41.9
Source: Environment and Climate Change Canada

== Economy ==
Nutashkuan's economy is mostly based on arts and handicrafts, trapping, tourism, and some construction, transport, and commercial fishing. In all there are some 20 businesses on the reserve. The Band council owns a boat and holds a crab-fishing licence.

Local economic development is promoted by and the responsibility of the Corporation de développement économique de Natashquan.

== Education ==
There is only one school on the reserve, École Uauitshitun, that provides pre-Kindergarten to Secondary grade 5.

== See also ==
- List of Indian reserves in Quebec
