= La Romaine, Quebec =

La Romaine
- First Nations reserve
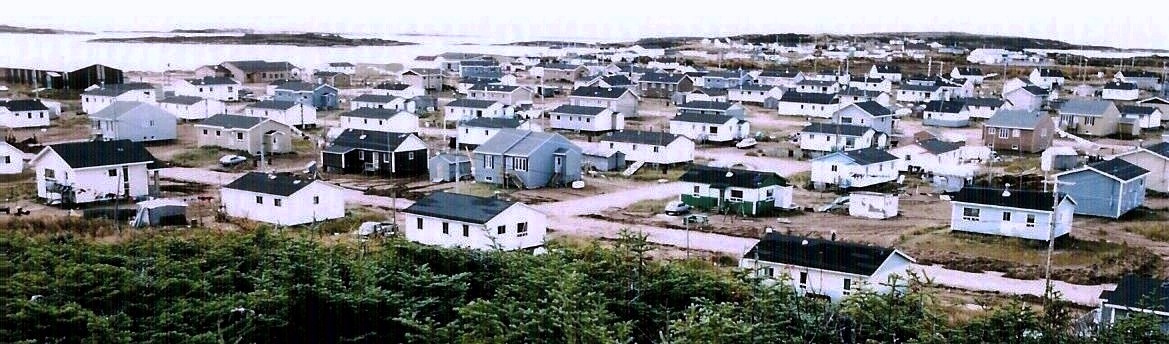

- Location in Côte-Nord Region of Quebec
- Coordinates: 50°13′N 60°40′W
- Country: Canada
- Province: Quebec
- Region: Côte-Nord
- Regional county: none
- Formed: 1956

Government
  - Chief: George Bacon
  - Federal riding: Côte-Nord—Kawawachikamach—Nitassinan
  - Prov. riding: Duplessis

Area
  - Land: 0.88 km^{2} (0.34 sq mi)

Population (2022)
  - Total: 1,165
  - Density: 1,153.6/km^{2} (2,988/sq mi)
- Time zone: UTC−04:00 (AST)
- Postal Code: G0G 1M0
- Area codes: 418 and 581

La Romaine (French pronunciation: [la ʁɔmɛn]), also known as Unamenshipit in Innu-aimun and designated Romaine 2, is an Innu First Nations reserve in the Côte-Nord region of Quebec, Canada, at the mouth of the Olomane River on the Gulf of Saint Lawrence. It belongs to the Innu band of Unamen Shipu. Being an enclave within the Municipality of Côte-Nord-du-Golfe-du-Saint-Laurent, it is geographically within Le Golfe-du-Saint-Laurent Regional County Municipality but administratively not part of it. Directly adjacent to the reserve is the community of La Romaine consisting of a small French-speaking population.

La Romaine is only accessible by boat or via the La Romaine Airport. It is serviced by a nursing station, community radio station, arena, community and recreation centre, municipal water and sewer system, fire station, and an aboriginal police force.

The name La Romaine is the French adaptation of the word Ulaman. Before its spelling was standardized, the place has also been called in times past: Fort Romaine, Olomanshibu, Olomenachibou, Ulimine, Ouromane, Olomanoshibou, Olomano, Romaine, La Romaine, Grande-Romaine, Gethsémani-d'Olumen, Gethsémani, Uanaman Hipiht, Ulamen Shipit, and Ulaman Shipu. These names applied sometimes to the old post, sometimes the village or the reserve, or sometimes to the river that flows through the place. Except for Gethsémani, all these variations have the same source: Unaman Shipu, from unaman meaning "vermilion" or "red ochre", and shipu meaning "river". Deposits of this material are found on the banks of the Olomane River.

== History ==
Since time immemorial, the Innu indigenous people would leave their inland winter hunting grounds to gather at the mouth of the Olomane River during the summer. Circa 1710, the French set up a fishing and trading post there that was taken over by the Labrador Company in 1780, followed by the Hudson's Bay Company in 1822. Around 1850, French Canadians from elsewhere in Quebec began to settle the area, and gradually concentrating in La Romaine when several smaller outposts were abandoned. In 1886, the local post office opened.

The trading post was closed in 1925. The Innu of the Basse-Côte-Nord (Lower North Shore) were one of the last nomadic indigenous groups in North America, and were known for their birch bark canoes and traditional travel by canoe or snowshoe. But contact with white settlers and the market economy led to the permanent settlement of the Innu.

On March 11, 1955, the Government of Quebec sold 100 acres (40 ha) of land to the federal government and on May 31, 1956, the Romaine reserve was established. It was expanded in 2001 with lands bought in 1993.

== Demographics ==
=== Population ===
Canada census – La Romaine, Quebec community profile

	2021	2016	2011
Population	n/a (% from 2016)	977 (-3.8% from 2011)	1016 (+9.7% from 2006)
Land area	0.84 km^{2} (0.32 sq mi)	0.63 km^{2} (0.24 sq mi)	0.88 km^{2} (0.34 sq mi)
Population density		1,557.5/km^{2} (4,034/sq mi)	1,153.6/km^{2} (2,988/sq mi)
Median age		27.8 (M: 25.8, F: 28.7)	27.7 (M: 27.0, F: 29.4)
Private dwellings		296 (total) 264 (occupied)	267 (total)
Median household income		$39,936	$26,004

Notes: 2021 census info not available.
References: 2021 2016 2011

Historical census populations – La Romaine

Year	Pop.	±%
1976	535	—
1981	583	+9.0%
1986	644	+10.5%
1991	758	+17.7%
1996	833	+9.9%

Year	Pop.	±%
2001	944	+13.3%
2006	926	−1.9%
2011	1,016	+9.7%
2016	977	−3.8%

2021 census info not available.
Source: Statistics Canada

As of May 2022, the band counted 1,243 members, of whom 1,165 persons are living in the community. In the 2016 census, the number of private dwellings occupied by usual residents are 264 out of a total of 296. Mother tongues of the residents on the reserve are:

- English as first language: 0%
- French as first language: 2.0%
- English and French as first language: 0%
- Other (Montagnais (Innu)) as first language: 97.4%

== Economy ==
The local economy is based mostly on arts and handicrafts, trapping, outfitters and tourism. Other businesses on the reserve are primarily community businesses such as arts and handicrafts, and a convenience store.

== Education ==
There is only one school on the reserve, École Olamen, that provides pre-Kindergarten to Secondary grade 5, and had an enrolment of 292 students in 2008-2009.
