= Petit-Mécatina =

- Unorganized territory
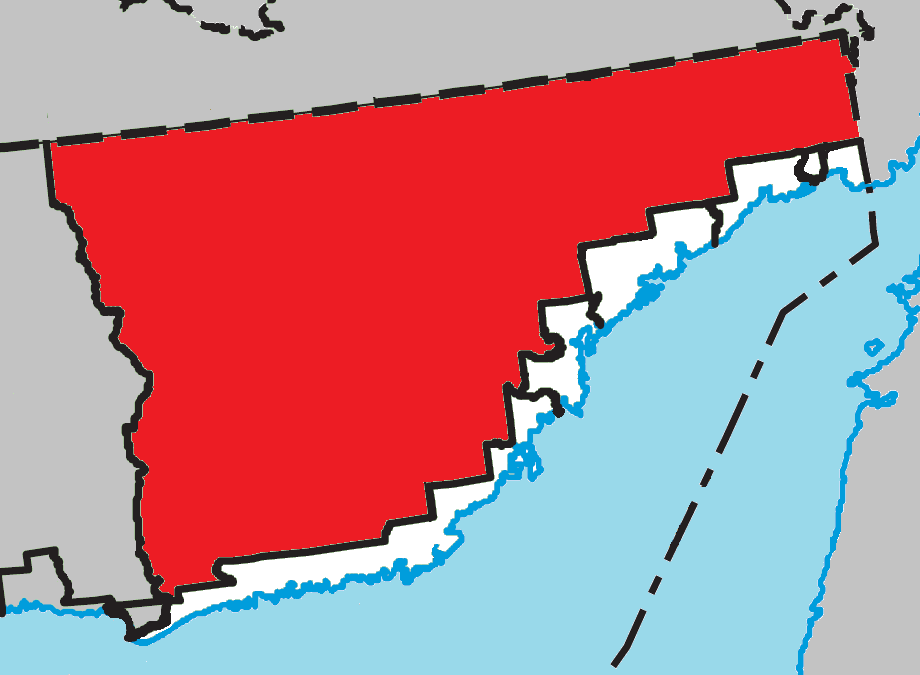
- Location within Le Golfe-du-Saint-Laurent RCM

- Location in Côte-Nord Region of Quebec
- Coordinates: 51°30′N 60°00′W
- Country: Canada
- Province: Quebec
- Region: Côte-Nord
- RCM: Le Golfe-du-Saint-Laurent
- Constituted: July 1, 1855

Government
  - Fed. riding: Côte-Nord—Kawawachikamach—Nitassinan
  - Prov. riding: Duplessis

Area
  - Total: 39,993.19 km^{2} (15,441.46 sq mi)
  - Land: 35,347.19 km^{2} (13,647.63 sq mi)

Population (2021)
  - Total: 0
  - Density: 0/km^{2} (0/sq mi)
  - Pop (2016-21): N/A
  - Dwellings: 0
- Time zone: UTC-4 (AST)
- Highways: No major routes

Petit-Mécatina (French pronunciation: [pəti mekatina]) is an unorganized territory in the Côte-Nord region of Quebec, Canada, part of Le Golfe-du-Saint-Laurent Regional County Municipality. It was formerly part of the Minganie Regional County Municipality, but transferred to the current MRC in July 2010.

It is named after the Petit Mécatina River that bisects the territory from north to south and empties in the Gulf of Saint Lawrence just west of Petit Mécatina Island. The 545 kilometres (339 mi) river forms east of Lake Aticonac just south of the boundary between the Atlantic and Saint Lawrence watersheds, that is also the disputed boundary between Quebec and Labrador. Mécatina comes from the Innu word makatinau and means "large mountain".

As part of the Labrador boundary dispute, the official borders of Petit-Mécatina as claimed by Quebec include part of the territory of Labrador.

== Demographics ==
The region has been completely uninhabited since at least 1991.

=== Population ===
Canada census – Petit-Mécatina community profile

	2021	2011
Population	0 (+0.0% from 2016)	0 (0.0% from 2006)
Land area	35,347.19 km^{2} (13,647.63 sq mi)	37,537.71 km^{2} (14,493.39 sq mi)
Population density	0/km^{2} (0/sq mi)	0.0/km^{2} (0/sq mi)
Median age	0 (M: 0, F: 0)	N/A (M: , F: )
Private dwellings	0 (total)	0 (total)
Median household income		$.N/A

References: 2021 2011

Historical Census Data - Petit-Mécatina, Quebec

Year	Pop.
1996	0
2001	0
2006	0

Year	Pop.
2011	0
2016	0
2021	0

Source: Statistics Canada

== See also ==
- List of unorganized territories in Quebec
