= Plucking (glaciation) =

Glacial erosion of bedrock

Zone of plucking in the formation of tarns and cirques

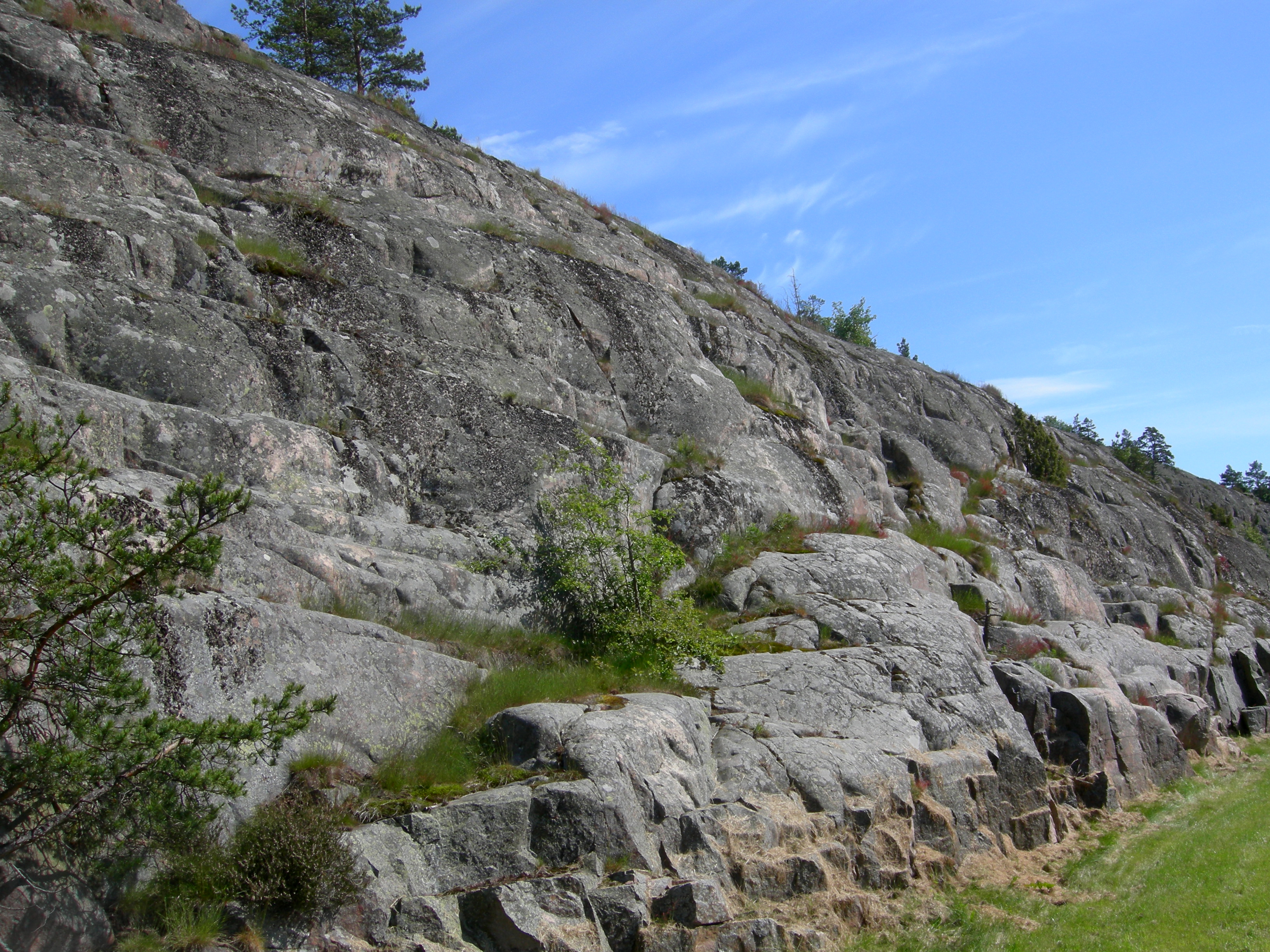
Glacially-plucked granitic bedrock near Mariehamn, Åland

Plucking, also referred to as quarrying, is a glacial phenomenon that is responsible for the weathering and erosion of pieces of bedrock, especially large "joint blocks". This occurs in a type of glacier called a "valley glacier". As a glacier moves down a valley, friction causes the basal ice of the glacier to melt and infiltrate joints (cracks) in the bedrock. The freezing and thawing action of the ice enlarges, widens, or causes further cracks in the bedrock as it changes volume across the ice/water phase transition (a form of hydraulic wedging), gradually loosening the rock between the joints. This produces large chunks of rock called joint blocks. Eventually these joint blocks come loose and become trapped in the glacier.

In this way, plucking has been linked to regelation. Rocks of all sizes can become trapped in the bottom of the glacier. Joint blocks up to three meters have been "plucked" and transported. These entrained rock fragments can also cause abrasion along the subsequent bedrock and walls. Plucking also leads to chatter marks, wedge shaped indentations left on the bedrock or other rock surfaces. Glacial plucking both exploits pre-existing fractures in the bedrock and requires continued fracturing to maintain the cycle of erosion. Glacial plucking is most significant where the rock surface is well jointed or fractured or where it contains exposed bed planes, as this allows meltwater and clasts to penetrate more easily.

Plucking of bedrock also occurs in steep upland rivers, and shares a number of similarities with glacial examples. In such cases, the loosening and detachment of blocks appears to result from a combination of (1) chemical and physical weathering along joints, (2) hydraulic wedging driven by smaller rock fragments getting into existing cracks, (3) crack propagation from stresses caused by impacts of large clasts already in transport by the river, and possibly (4) crack propagation driven by flexing resulting from pressure variation in the overlying water during floods. Loosened blocks are then carried away by fast flowing water during large floods, though the entrainment is believed to be significantly less efficient than the equivalent ability of ice to carry away blocks under glaciers.

== Plucking mechanisms ==
Glacial plucking is largely dependent on the amount of stress exerted on a clast overlain by glacial ice. This relationship is a balance between the shear stress exerted on the clast and the normal pressure on the clast by a body of ice. Plucking is increased where there are preexisting fractures in a rock bed. As the glacier slides down a mountain, energy from friction, pressure or geothermal heat causes glacial meltwater to infiltrate the spaces between rocks. This process, known as frost wedging, puts stress on the rock structure as water expands when it freezes. Impacts from large clasts carried in the bedload can cause additional stress to the bedrock. Additionally, plucking can be seen as a positive feedback system in which the increased action of rock removed from the landscape entrained in the glacier causes larger scale fracturing further down the glacier because of a heavier load of force pushing down on the rock bed.

== Mechanical erosion ==
Glacial plucking is the main mechanism of other small scale mechanical glacial erosion such as striation, abrasion and glacial polishing. The heavier the sediment load, the more extreme the erosion of the downhill landscape. Erosion is largely dependent on the amount of water flow and its velocity, the clast size and hardness with relation to the stability of the slope.

=== Glacial striation ===
A rock that has been subject to glacial erosion will often show a striation pattern in which the rock appears scratched. Long parallel lines will cover the rock and show the appearance of something having been dragged along the top of it. Although striations can form on any sort of rock, they are usually present on more stable bedrock such as quartzite or granite where erosion processes are more readily preserved. Striations, because of their nature of erosion, can also tell geologists the path and movement of the glacier.

=== Polishing ===
Glacial polishing is the result of clasts embedded in glacial ice passing over bedrock and grinding down the top of the rock into a smoother surface. The small rocks entrained by plucking act like sandpaper to the downhill slope. This creates an almost mirror like surface in the rock. Polish indicates a more recent process as it is often lost to weathering of the rock surface.

== Glacial till ==
The joint blocks and rock fragments that are entrained and carried down a mountain can be deposited as till. This leads to a whole set of depositional glacial landforms such as moraines, roche moutonnées, glacial erratics and drumlin fields.
