= Duck River (Minganie) =

- Location within Quebec

Location
- Country: Canada
- Province: Quebec
- Region: Côte-Nord
- RCM: Minganie

Physical characteristics
- Source: Unidentified lake
  - location: Rivière-au-Tonnerre
  - coordinates: 50.34302°N 64.78892°W
  - elevation: 120 m (390 ft)
- Mouth: Gulf of Saint Lawrence
  - location: Rivière-au-Tonnerre
  - coordinates: 50.27389°N 64.79361°W
  - elevation: 1 metre (3 ft 3 in)
- Length: 13.0 km (8.1 mi)

Basin features
- Tributaries
  - left: (upstream) 4 streams draining a marsh area.
  - right: (upstream) discharge from a lake, discharge from the Lacs de la Passe Sale, discharge from a small lake.

The rivière Duck (English: Duck River) is a watercourse that crosses the municipality of Rivière-au-Tonnerre, in the Minganie Regional County Municipality, in the administrative region of Côte-Nord, in province of Quebec, in Canada.

The southern part of the hydrographic slope of the Duck River is served by the route 138 which runs along the north shore of the Gulf of Saint Lawrence. The forest road R0902 (going up towards the North-West) serves the eastern part of this slope going up this valley; then the western part of the upper part.

== Geography ==
The course of the Duck River generally descends to the south, between the rivière à Jim-Hearst (located to the west) and the rivière au Tonnerre (located at the east).

The Duck River originates from a lake (length: 2.7 km (1.7 mi); altitude: 120 m (390 ft)). This source is located in a forest area at:

- 2.2 km (1.4 mi) southwest of the course of the Tonnerre river;
- 8.2 km (5.1 mi) northwest of the mouth of the Duck River;
- 7.9 km (4.9 mi) north-west of the center of the village of rivière-au-Tonnerre;
- 85.3 km (53.0 mi) southwest of the center of the village of Havre-Saint-Pierre.

From its source, the Duck River flows on 13.0 km (8.1 mi) with a drop of 119 m (390 ft), according to the following segments:

- 3.8 m (12 ft) towards the south, collecting a stream (coming from the west), forming a loop towards the west, until a bend in the river, corresponding to the discharge (coming from west) of the Lacs de la Passe Sale;
- 2.7 m (8 ft 10 in) first eastward, passing under the bridge of a forest road, to a bend in the river, located on the west side of a marsh area; then to the south-east, to a bend in the river, corresponding to the discharge of a lake (coming from the west);
- 6.5 km (4.0 mi) towards the south, first along a marsh area (located on the east side), forming a hook towards the west where it passes under the bridge on rue de la Forêt (route R0902), forming two large S's at the end of the segment and passing under the bridge on route 138 (rue Jacques-Cartier), then under the bridge on rue des Sarcelles, up to at its mouth.

The mouth of this river has a small estuary stretching 0.59 km (0.37 mi), that is to say downstream of route 138, designated Anse à Harry. This small estuary could serve as a refuge in case of big waves on the Gulf. This cove is located between Anse Kennedy (located to the east) and Anse à Roméo-Noël (located to the west).

== Toponymy ==
The toponym "Rivière Duck" was made official on June 13, 1997, at the Place Names Bank of the Commission de toponymie du Québec.

== See also ==
- Minganie Regional County Municipality
- List of rivers of Quebec
