= Charpeney =

Charpeney and the variant Charpenay may refer to:

== Personalities ==
- Hyacinthe Auguste Charpeney (1826–1882), missionary Oblate of Mary Immaculate, provincial treasurer, superior and pastor, in Quebec

== Place ==
- Charpeney (canton) (English: Charpeney Township), township on the Côte-Nord, in Minganie, Quebec, Canada
- Charpeney Lake, the main body of fresh water at the head of Saint-Jean North-East River in Lac-Jérôme, Quebec, Canada
