= Chatter mark =

Mark left by rocks within moving glaciers

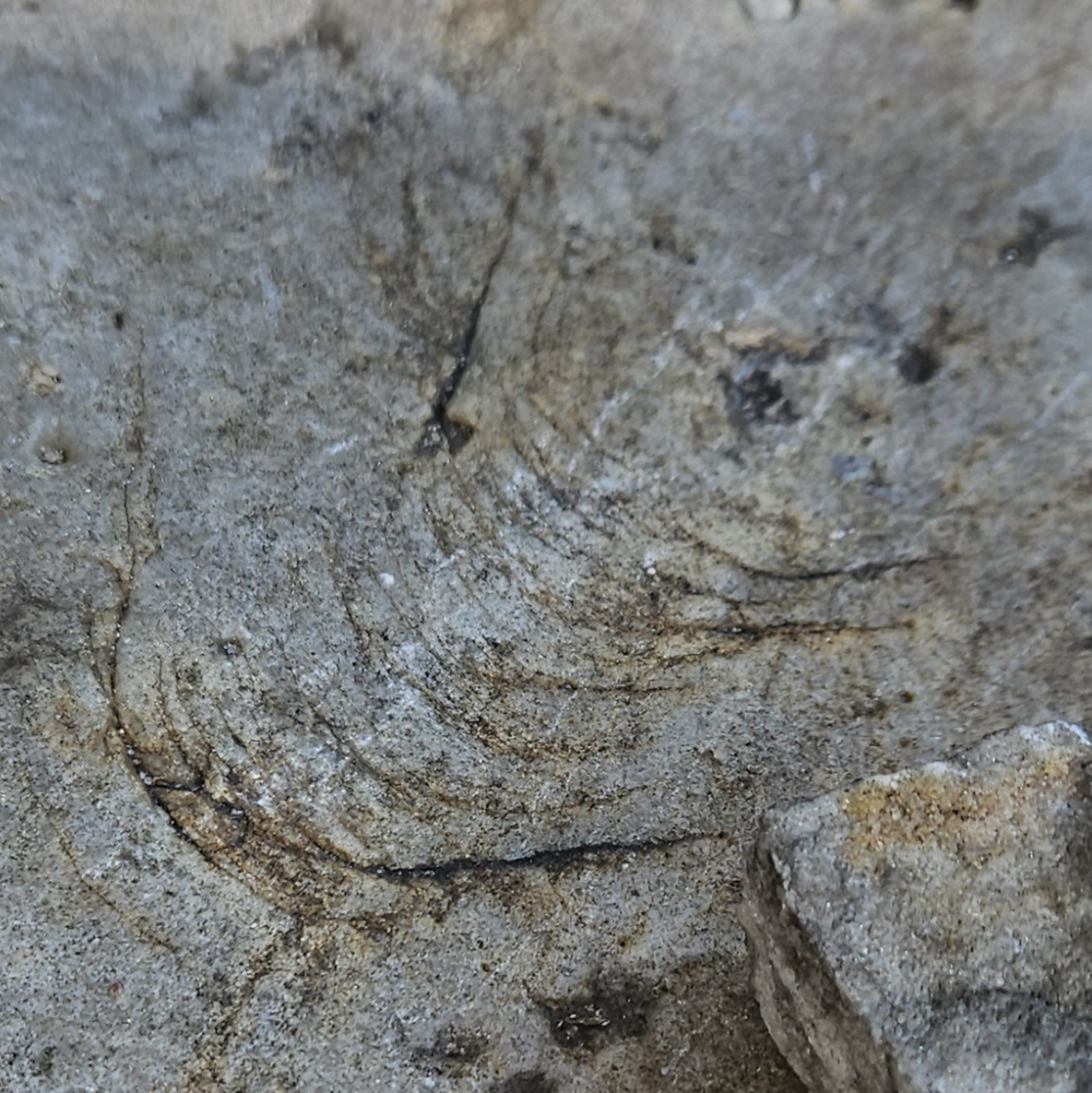
Chatter marks on sandstone south of Lac Beauchamp, in Gatineau, Quebec, Canada

In glacial geology, a chatter mark is a wedge-shaped mark (usually of a series of such marks) left by chipping of a bedrock surface by rock fragments carried in the base of a glacier (glacial plucking). Marks tend to be crescent-shaped and oriented at right angles to the direction of ice movement.

There are three main types of chatter marks. A crescentic gouge is an upstream-facing concave mark created when a piece of rock is removed. A crescentic fracture is a downstream-facing concave mark that also results from rock removal. In contrast, a lunate fracture is likewise downstream-facing but forms without the removal of rock material.

== See also ==
- Glacial polish
- Glacial striation
