= Sault Plat River =

Sault Plat River Rivière du Sault Plat
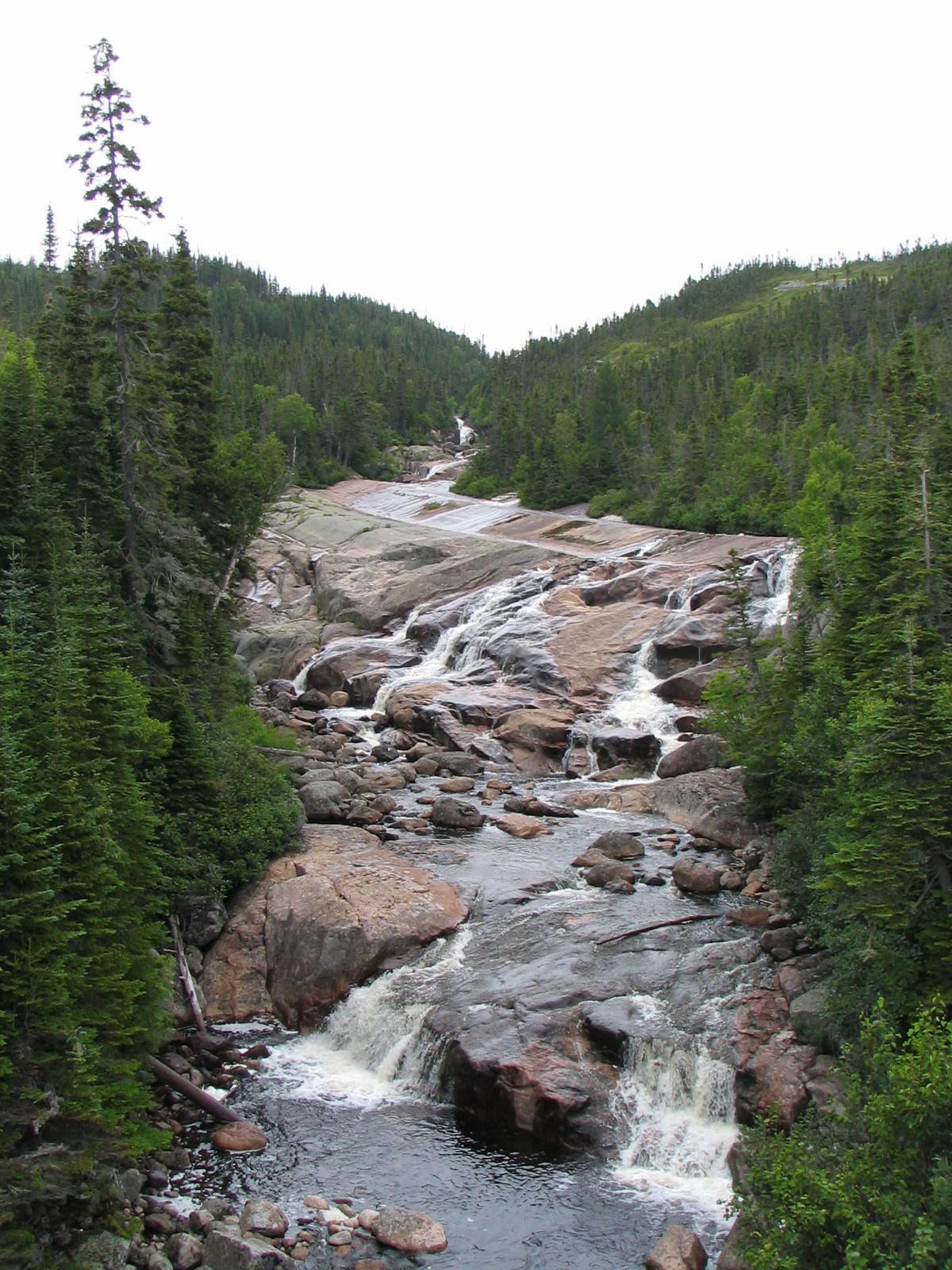
- Flutes and glacial striations engraved in the bedrock of the Canadian Shield, forest covert

- Location within Quebec

Location
- Country: Canada
- Province: Quebec
- Region: Côte-Nord
- RCM: Minganie

Physical characteristics
- Source
  - elevation: 244 metres (801 ft)
- 2nd source: Lake Delaunay
  - elevation: 148 metres (486 ft)
- Mouth: Gulf of Saint Lawrence
  - coordinates: 50.292778°N 65.443056°W
  - elevation: 0 metres (0 ft)
- Length: 34 kilometres (21 mi)
- Basin size: 93.1 square kilometres (35.9 sq mi)
- Discharge
  - location: Mouth
  - average: 3.8 cubic metres per second (130 cu ft/s)
  - minimum: 0.8 cubic metres per second (28 cu ft/s)
  - maximum: 9.2 cubic metres per second (320 cu ft/s)

Basin features
- Tributaries
  - left: (upstream) 5 streams, discharge from one lake (via Lac Tête de Loon, discharge from two lakes.
  - right: (upstream) Discharge of a dozen lakes, stream (via Lac Tête de Loon).

The Sault Plat River (French: Rivière du Sault Plat) flows north/south on the north shore of the Gulf of St. Lawrence, in Sept-Rivières and Minganie RCM, in Côte-Nord region, Quebec, Canada. Part of the river is located in the municipality of Rivière-au-Tonnerre, and is visible from The Whale Route (138).

== Toponymy ==
The toponym "Rivière du Sault Plat" was made official on December 5, 1968 in the place name bank of the Commission de toponymie du Québec.

The name first appeared officially on a map in 1969 in the Répertoire géographique du Québec. The river was not named on 1913 & 1927 maps by Gustave Rinfret or Edgar Rochette (1890-1953).

== Geology and geomorphology ==
Considered a geological heritage, the furrows of glacial erosion in the rock where the Plat de Sault River flows make it of exceptional geological interest. The site offers remarkable geological and geomorphological landscapes to admire and study.

The rocks of the river show furrows of glacial erosion.

The Sault Plat River flows in a trough-like shape carved into the rock of the Canadian Shield by the passage of glaciers during the last glaciation.The erosion marks due to the mechanical abrasion of the ice, the grooves, are up to 5 metres wide, the depth generally corresponds to a third of the width. The elongation of the groove corresponds to the direction of the glacial flow some 18,000 years ago.

The bedrock of the area belongs to the Grenville Geological Province. This 34 km long river flows over eye-eyed granite orthogneiss.

Located to the west of Minganie RCM, the Sault Plat watershed is bordered to the east by the Tortue River watershed and to the west by the Bouleau River watershed. It covers an area of 93 km2.

The Sault Plat River empties into the Gulf of St. Lawrence at 50°17'34" N and 65°26'35" W, 50 km west of the village of Rivière-au-Tonnerre and 70 km east of the city of Sept-Îles.

== Soil and subsoil ==
On the edge of the Gulf of St. Lawrence, the coastal plain area is 5 km wide. It is characterized by an escarpment of nearly 100 m of difference in altitude by the sea and by a relatively flat plateau gradually rising to an altitude of 150 m at its northern limit.

Upstream, with an average altitude of up to 300 m, the piedmont zone divides the dominant physiography and corresponds to the rest of the catchment area. At the northern end of the watershed, rounded rocky hills rising to 533 make up the relief.

The subsoil of the watershed is composed of magmatic rocks, mostly an assemblage of undeformed granite and pegmatite. A band of migmatite more than 5 km wide crosses the basin from east to west in its center. The bedrock is covered only by a thin layer of discontinuous glacial deposits not exceeding a thickness of 1 m. The coastal fringe is characterized by the regression and transgression of the Goldthwait Sea, which has left a large amount of marine clay and silt sediments covered by deltaic sandy sediments. A series of giant glacial grooves located on the bed of the river near the mouth and visible from the Route des Baleines (138) is listed as an exceptional geological site.

== Hydrology ==
Entirely located in the Minganie RCM, the Sault Plat River watershed includes three major lakes.
Lake Delaunay, located in the centre of the watershed, occupies an old glacial valley in a "U" shape and has a very elongated shape in the north/south axis (8 km long by a few hundred metres wide, for an area of 3.06 km2).

Sault Plat River natural heritage

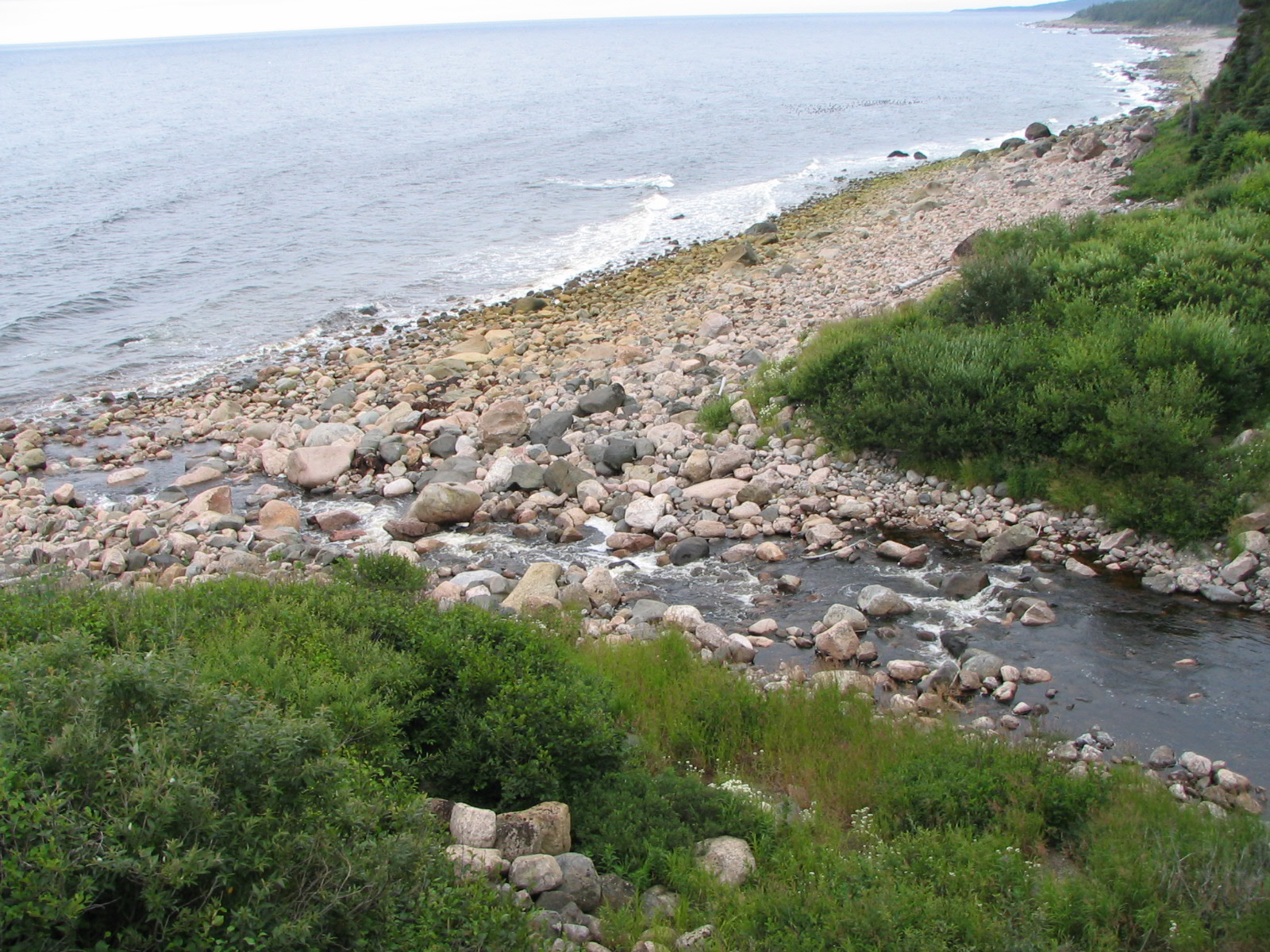
Gulf of St. Lawrence, mouth of River, coastal shore

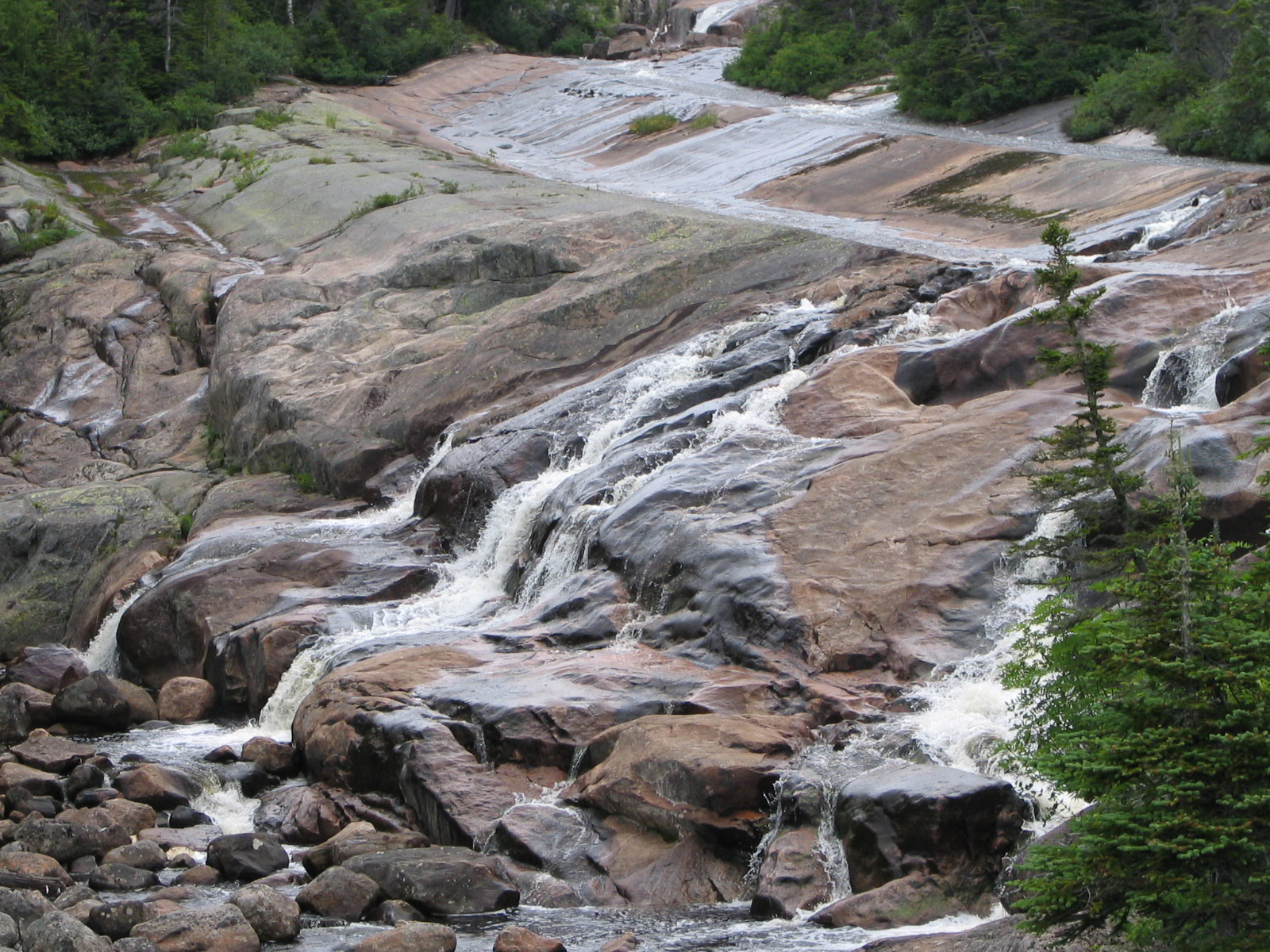
The river flow in the glacial striations engraved in the bedrock of the Canadian Shield

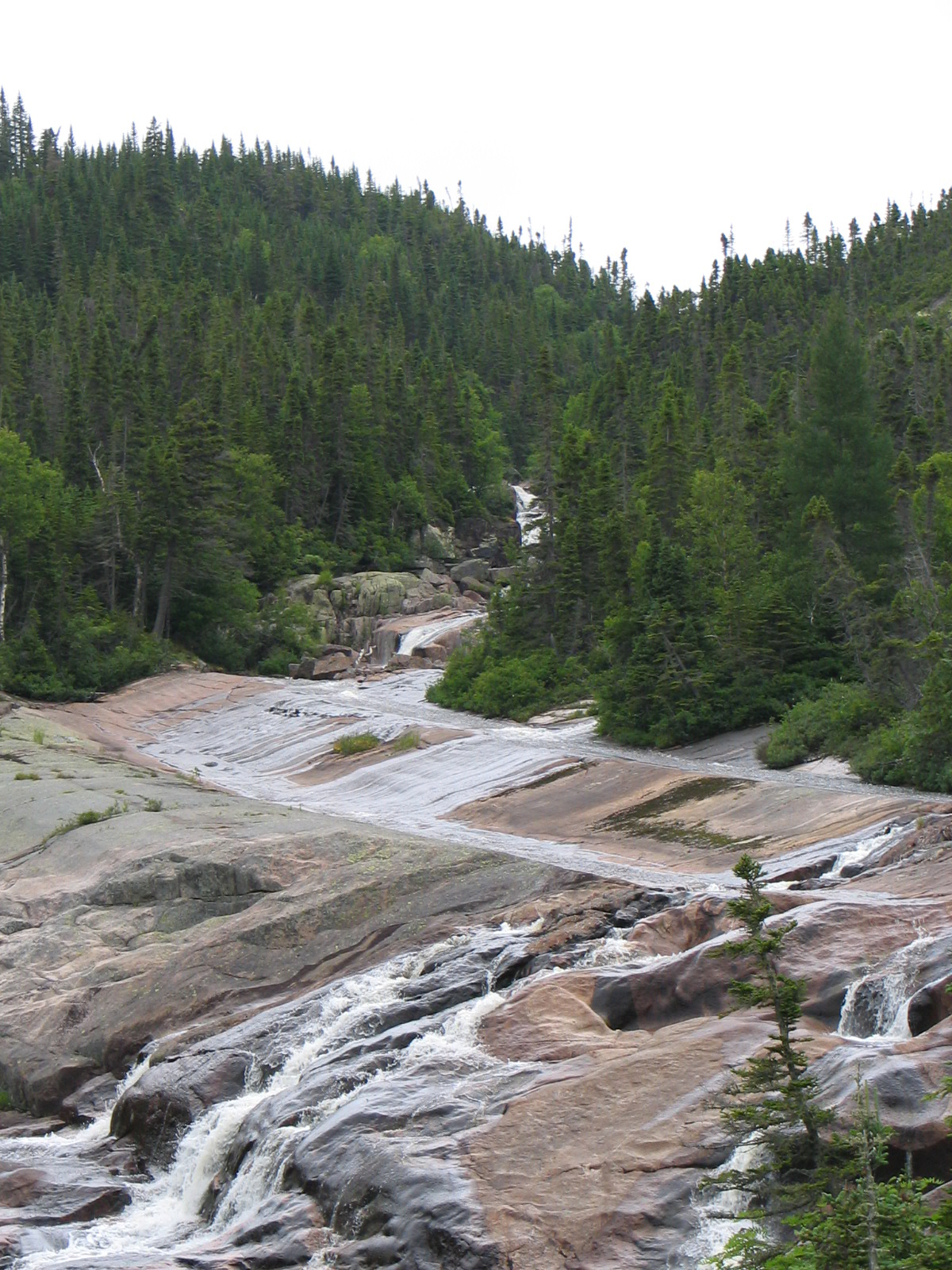
Forets area, river flow in the glacial striations

== Environnement ==
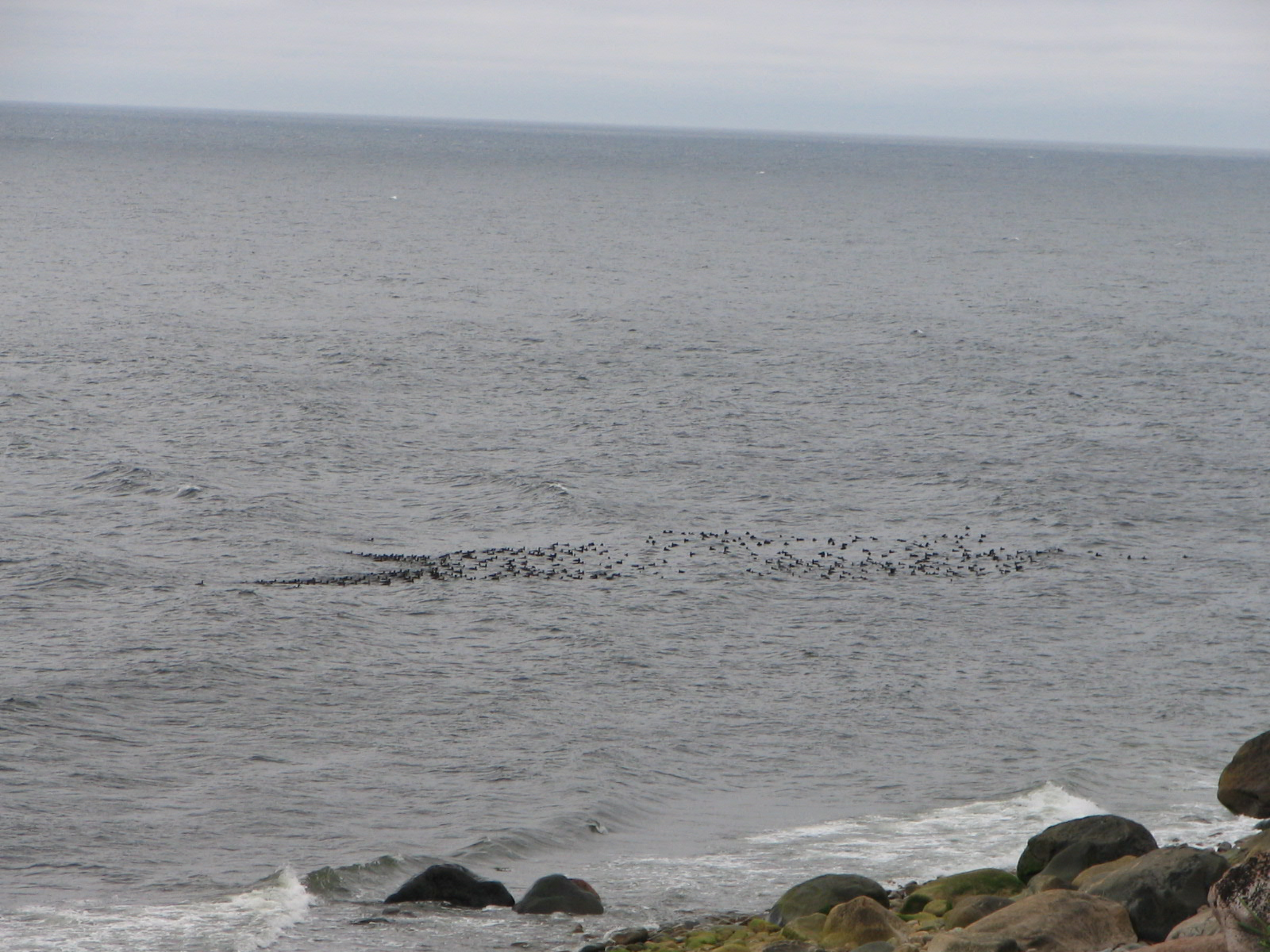
Raft of coastal seabirds a few metres from the mouth of the river

An important migratory stopover for birds, the Côte-Nord offers many favourite sites to observe 350 listed species at leisure.

=== Avian fauna ===
Birding lists at the mouth of the Sault Plat River in 2021, 2020, 2016, by various field observers of eBird Quebec managed by QuébecOiseaux.

- Somateria mollissima. — Eider à duvet. — (Common Eider).
- Melanitta perspicillata. — Macreuse à front blanc ou Macreuse à lunettes. — (Surf scoter).
- Melanitta deglandi. — Macreuse à ailes blanches. — (White-winged Scoter).
- Melanitta americana. — Macreuse à bec jaune. — (Black Scoter).
- Mergus serrator. — Harle huppé. — (Red-breasted merganser).
- Mergus merganser. — Grand Harle. — (Common Merganser).
- Uria aalge. — Guillemot marmette ou Guillemot de Troïl. — (Common Murre).
- Gavia immer. — Plongeon huard. — (Common loon).
- Morus bassanus. — Fou de Bassan. — (Northern Gannet).
- Phalacrocorax auritus. — Cormoran à aigrettes. — (Double-crested cormorant).

=== Flora ===
On the coastal plain, the forest cover of the watershed is dominated by balsam fir and Black spruce forest, in the piedmont zone, the Black spruce forest with Fir and moss dominates.

- Abies balsamea (Linnae) Miller. — Sapin baumier. — Sapin. — (balsam fir).
- Picea mariana (Miller) BSP. — Épicéa marial, Épinette noire. — (Black spruce).

== See also ==
- Thunder River, flows into the Gulf of St. Lawrence in the municipality of Rivière-au-Tonnerre
