= Delaunay Lake =

Lake in Quebec, Canada

Delauney Lake
- Location within Quebec
- Location: Rivière-au-Tonnerre, Minganie Regional County Municipality (RCM), Côte-Nord, Quebec, Canada
- Coordinates: 50°24′07″N 65°27′39″W
- Type: Natural
- Primary inflows: (clockwise from the mouth); Five streams (from East); outlet of Fauteux Lake (from South)
- Primary outflows: Rivière du Sault Plat
- Basin countries: Canada
- Max. length: 8.6 kilometres (5.3 mi)
- Max. width: 1.5 kilometres (0.93 mi)
- Surface elevation: 148 metres (486 ft)

Lac Delaunay is the main body of fresh water at the head of the rivière du Sault Plat, flowing in the municipality of Rivière-au-Tonnerre, in the Minganie Regional County Municipality, in the administrative region of Côte-Nord, in province of Quebec, in Canada.

== Geography ==
Lac Delaunay is located at the western end of the municipality of Rivière-au-Tonnerre.

Lake Delaunay has a length of 8.6 km (5.3 mi), a maximum width of 1.5 km (0.93 mi) in its northern part and an altitude of 148 m (486 ft). This lake between the mountains is fed in particular by nine discharges of lakes or streams. In particular, it receives the waters of Grace and Boutereau lakes.

The mouth of Lake Delaunay is located southeast of the lake. This mouth is located at:

- 69.7 km (43.3 mi) north-east of downtown Sept-Îles;
- 9.6 km (6.0 mi) north of the mouth of the Sault Plat River;
- 48.9 km (30.4 mi) south-west of the center of the village of Rivière-au-Tonnerre.

From the mouth of Charpeney Lake, the current flows down the Sault Plat River over 11.5 km (7.1 mi), which empties on the north shore of Gulf of St. Lawrence.

== Toponymy ==
Formerly, Lake Delaunay was designated "Lac des Pinet". This old designation was associated with an Innu family who frequented this area to hunt.

Lake Delaunay pays homage to Pierre Delaunay, born in 1616 in Fresnay-le-Boesme, in Maine, in France. This toponym was entered in 1945 in the register of the Commission de géographie du Québec. Delaunay arrived in Canada in 1635 to work as a clerk in the service of the Company of One Hundred Associates.

Delaunay married on November 7, 1645, in Quebec, to Françoise Pinguet. The couple had three sons: Louis, Henri and Charles Delaunay. In 1645, the governor of Montmagny granted Delaunay land in the current Saint-Sacrement district of Quebec. With regret, Delaunay died on November 28, 1654, during an attack by the Iroquois. His surviving spouse remarried in 1655 to Vincent Poirier, sieur de Bellepoire; two daughters, Anne and Thérèse, were born from this second marriage. Françoise Pinguet died in Quebec on May 29, 1661.

The toponym "lac Delaunay" was made official on December 5, 1968, by the Commission de toponymie du Québec, i.e. when this commission was created.

== Appendices ==
- Minganie Regional County Municipality
- Rivière-au-Tonnerre, a municipality
- Rivière du Sault Plat, a stream
- List of lakes in Canada
