= Glacial striation =

Bedrock abrasions from glacier movement

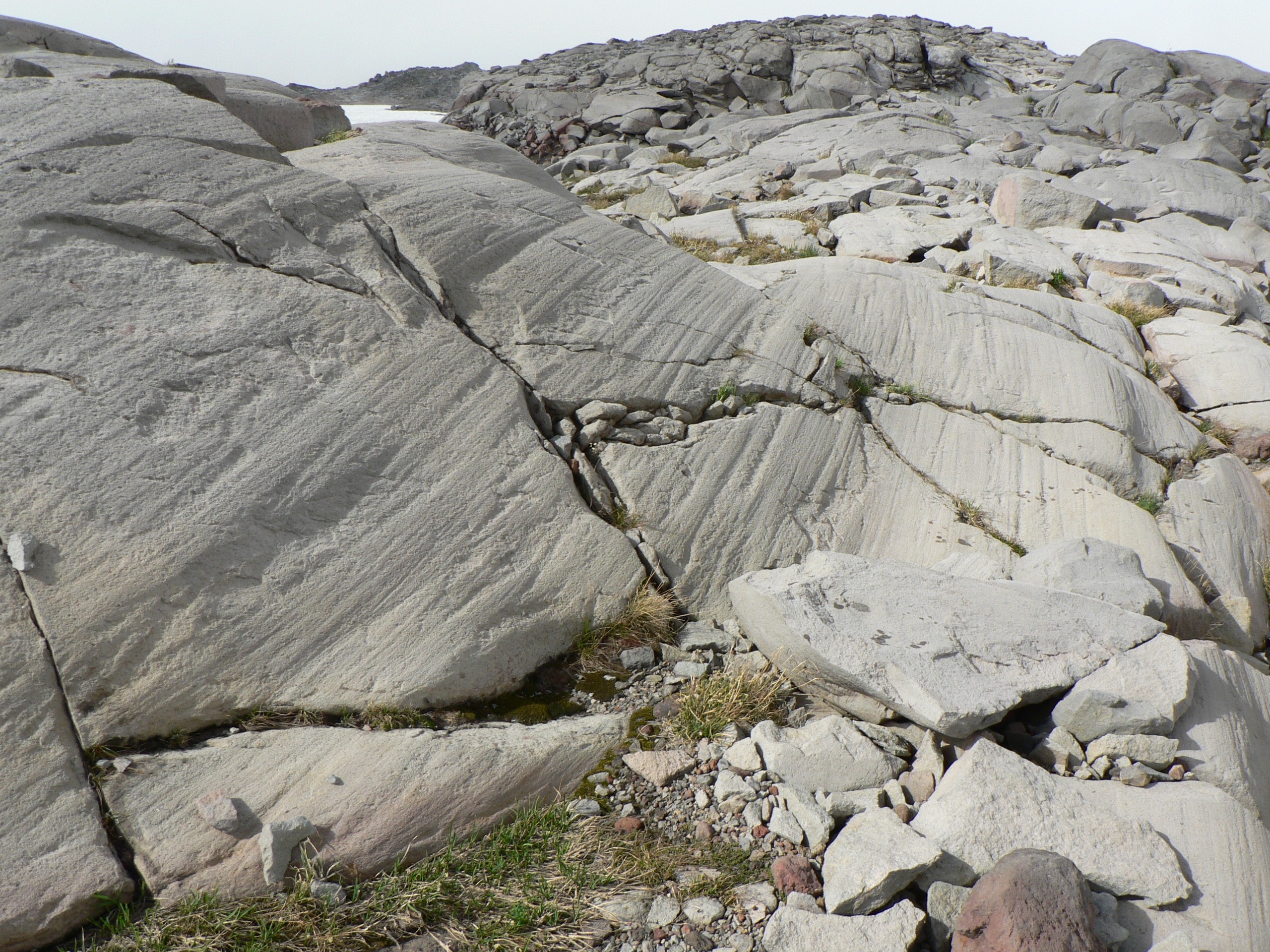
Glacial striations at Mount Rainier National Park

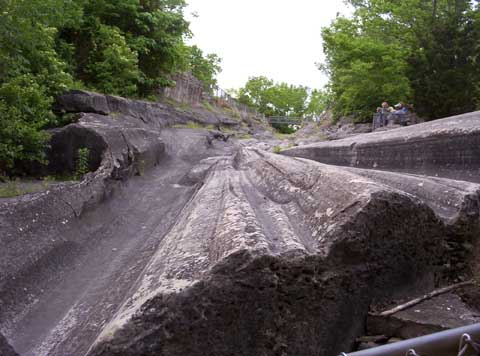
Glacial grooves stemming from the Wisconsin glaciation at Kelleys Island, Ohio

Glacial striations or striae are scratches or gouges cut into bedrock by glacial abrasion. These scratches and gouges were first recognized as the result of a moving glacier in the late 18th century when Swiss alpinists first associated them with moving glaciers. They also noted that if they were visible today that the glaciers must also be receding.

Glacial striations are usually multiple, straight, and parallel, representing the movement of the glacier using rock fragments and sand grains, embedded in the base of the glacier, as cutting tools. Large amounts of coarse gravel and boulders carried along underneath the glacier provide the abrasive power to cut trough-like glacial grooves. Finer sediments also in the base of the moving glacier further scour and polish the bedrock surface, forming a glacial pavement. Ice itself is not a hard enough material to change the shape of rock but because the ice has rock embedded in the basal surface it can effectively abrade the bedrock.

Most glacial striations were exposed by the retreat of glaciers since the Last Glacial Maximum or the more recent Little Ice Age. As well as indicating the direction of flow of the glacial ice, the depth and extent of weathering of the striations may be used to estimate the duration of post-glacier exposure of the rock.

An outstanding example of glacial grooves can be found at the Glacial Grooves at Kelleys Island, Ohio (a National Natural Landmark), the most impressive of which is 120 metres (400 ft) long, 10 metres (35 ft) wide, and up to 3 metres (10 ft) deep. These grooves cut into the Columbus Limestone. Striations cover the sides and bottoms of the grooves.

Other examples of glacial striations can be found in the former path of the Moiry Glacier, south of Grimentz, Anniviers, Valais, Switzerland, alongside the present path of the glacier, north-east of the 2016 location of the tongue of the glacier (images).

== Factors affecting glacial abrasion rate ==
The following affect the rate of abrasion:

- The amount of rock debris embedded in the basal surface of the ice. If there is no rock in the basal surface of the ice there will be no abrasion, but if there is too much rock in the basal surface of the ice the motion of the glacier will be affected, thus affecting abrasion rates.
- As the bedrock is being worn away the abrading fragments within the glacier are also being worn. Similarly to sandpaper being worn away with use. A continued supply of abrading fragments is required to uphold a similar level of abrasion.
- The fragments must be harder than the bedrock. Quartz fragments will abrade shale but shale fragments will not abrade a quartz rich bedrock.
- A constant flow of meltwater between the basal surface and the bedrock speeds abrasion. The meltwater constantly rinses away the rock flour allowing the coarser fragments to abrade bedrock.
- Speed of the glacier. The faster the glacier moves, the faster the bedrock will be eroded.
- Thickness of the ice. Thicker ice causes more downward force and increased pressure between the abrading fragments and the bedrock. There is a limit to how much ice will enhance abrasion. If the friction force between fragments and bedrock is too great the ice will flow around the fragments.
- Basal meltwater under high pressure. If the meltwater is under sufficiently high pressure it will cause the ice to effectively buoy up and decrease the normal force of the ice on the bedrock. Another result of this is that the velocity of the glacier is increased.
- Shape of the fragments. Larger more angular fragments will scratch and scour more effectively than small and round fragments will.

== Gallery ==
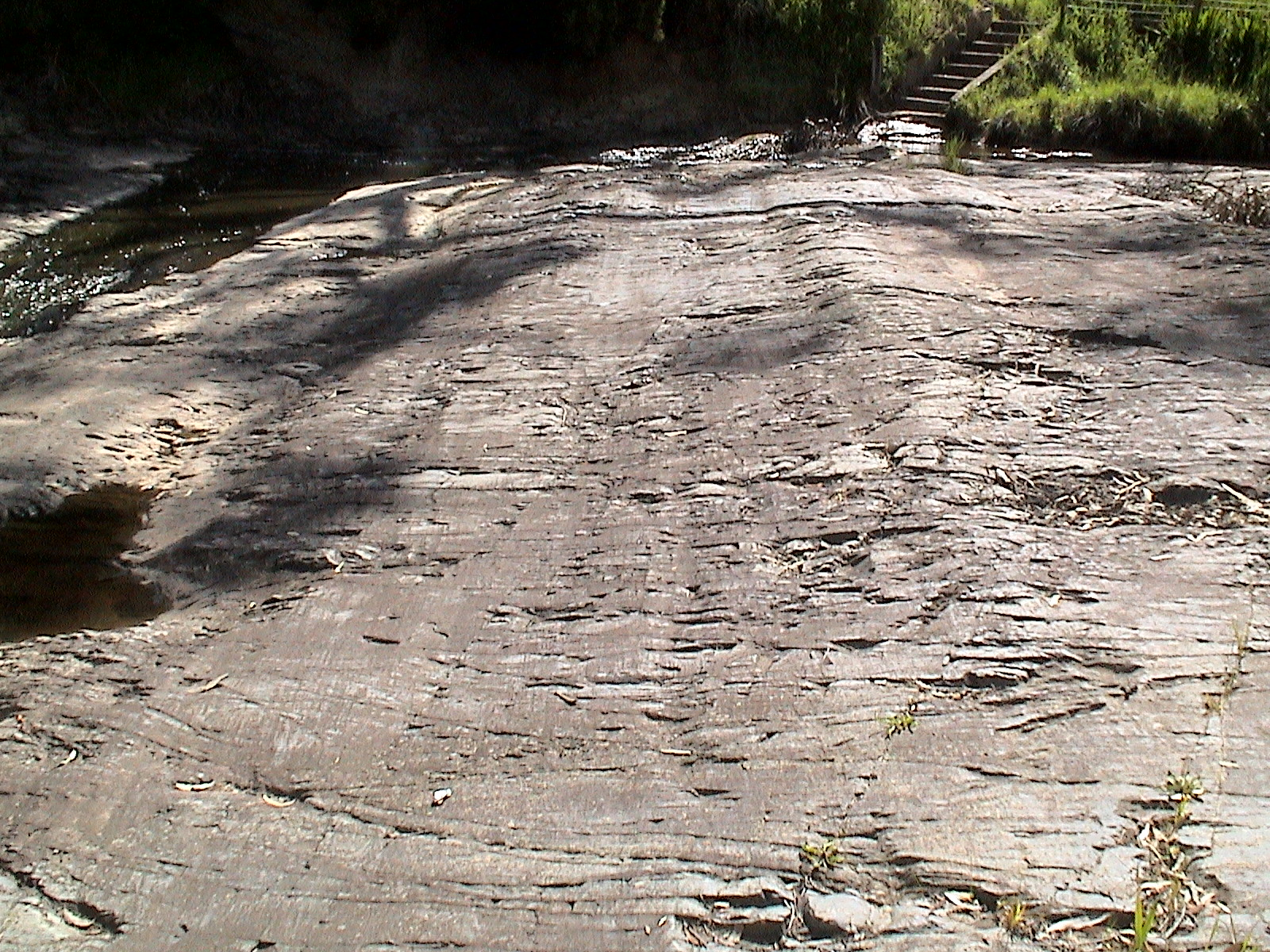
Selwyn Rock, South Australia – grooves and striations on exhumed glacial pavement

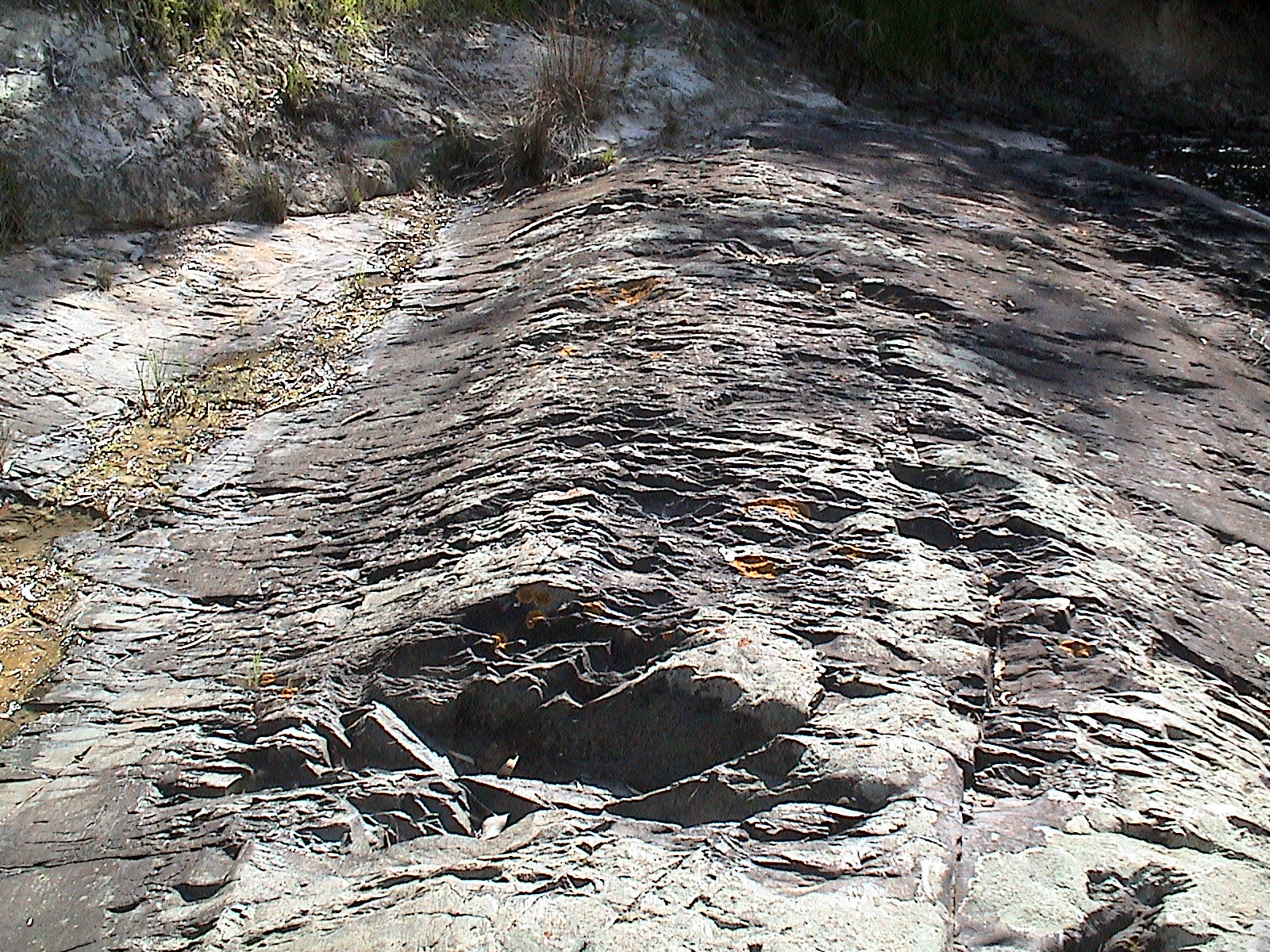
Selwyn Rock – grooves and striations on exhumed glacial pavement

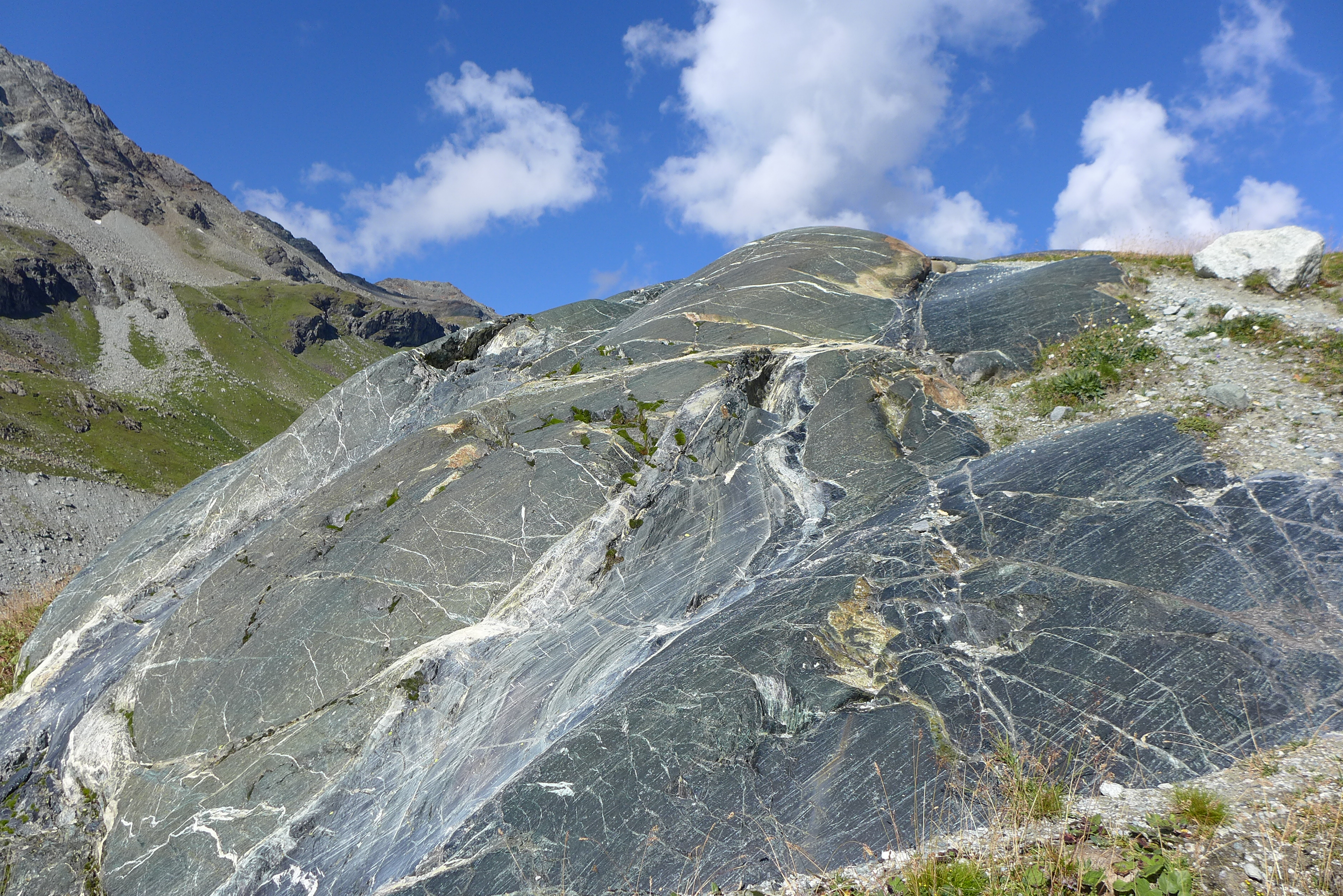
Glacial striations on an eroded rock alongside the Moiry Glacier, Switzerland, visible in the lower right quarter of the image

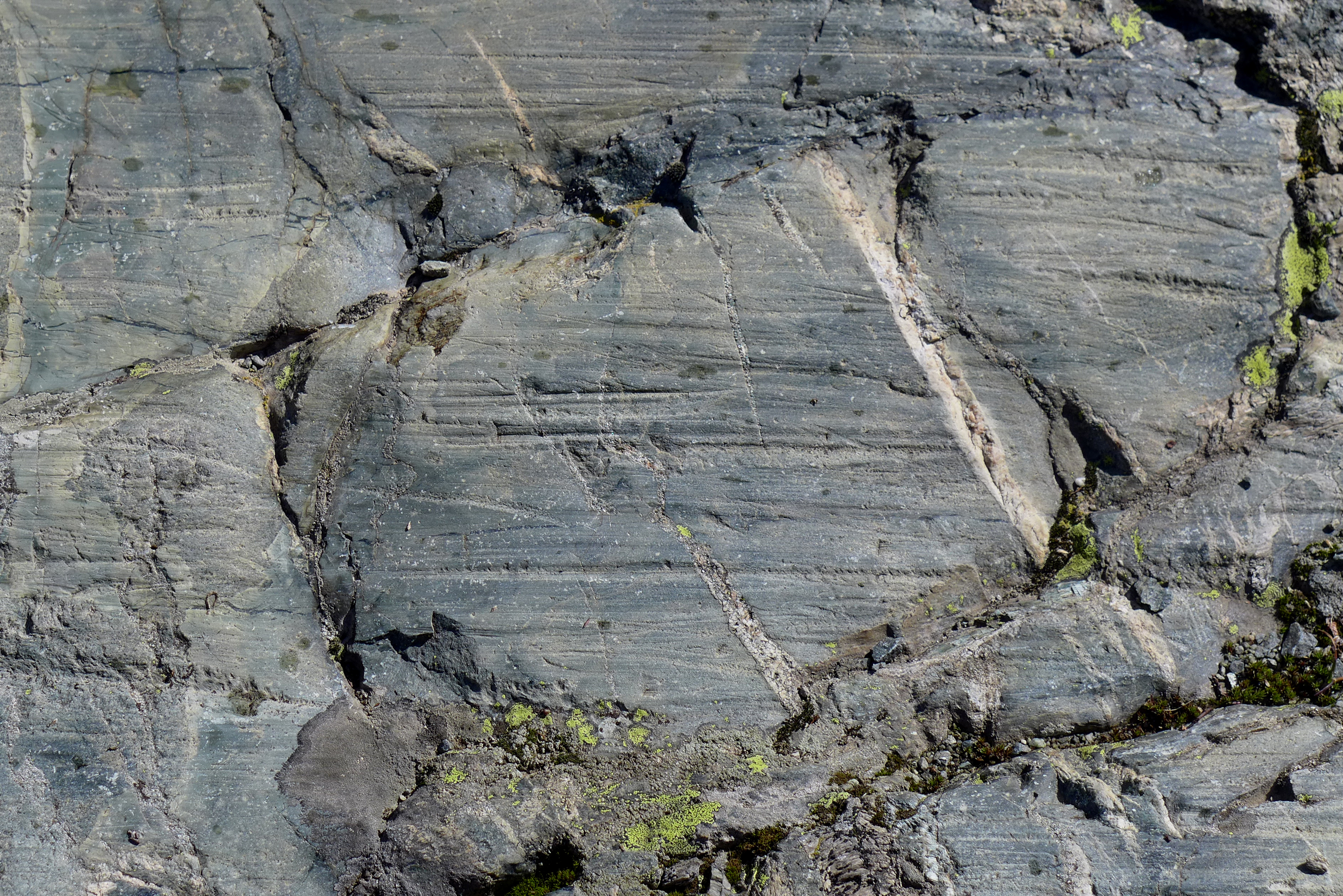
Glacial striations on an eroded rock alongside the Moiry Glacier, Switzerland

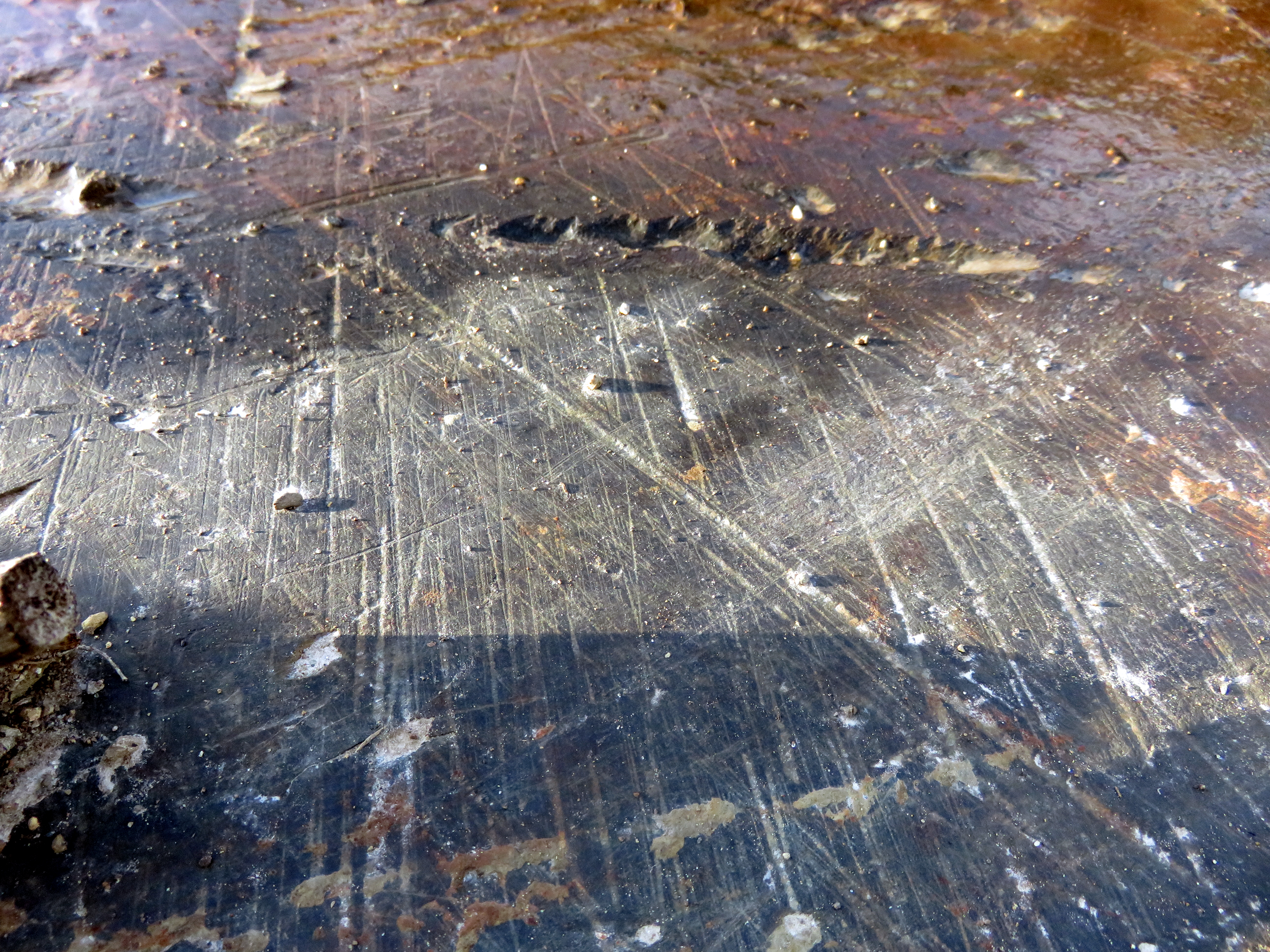
Glacial striations on bedrock in northern Maine, US

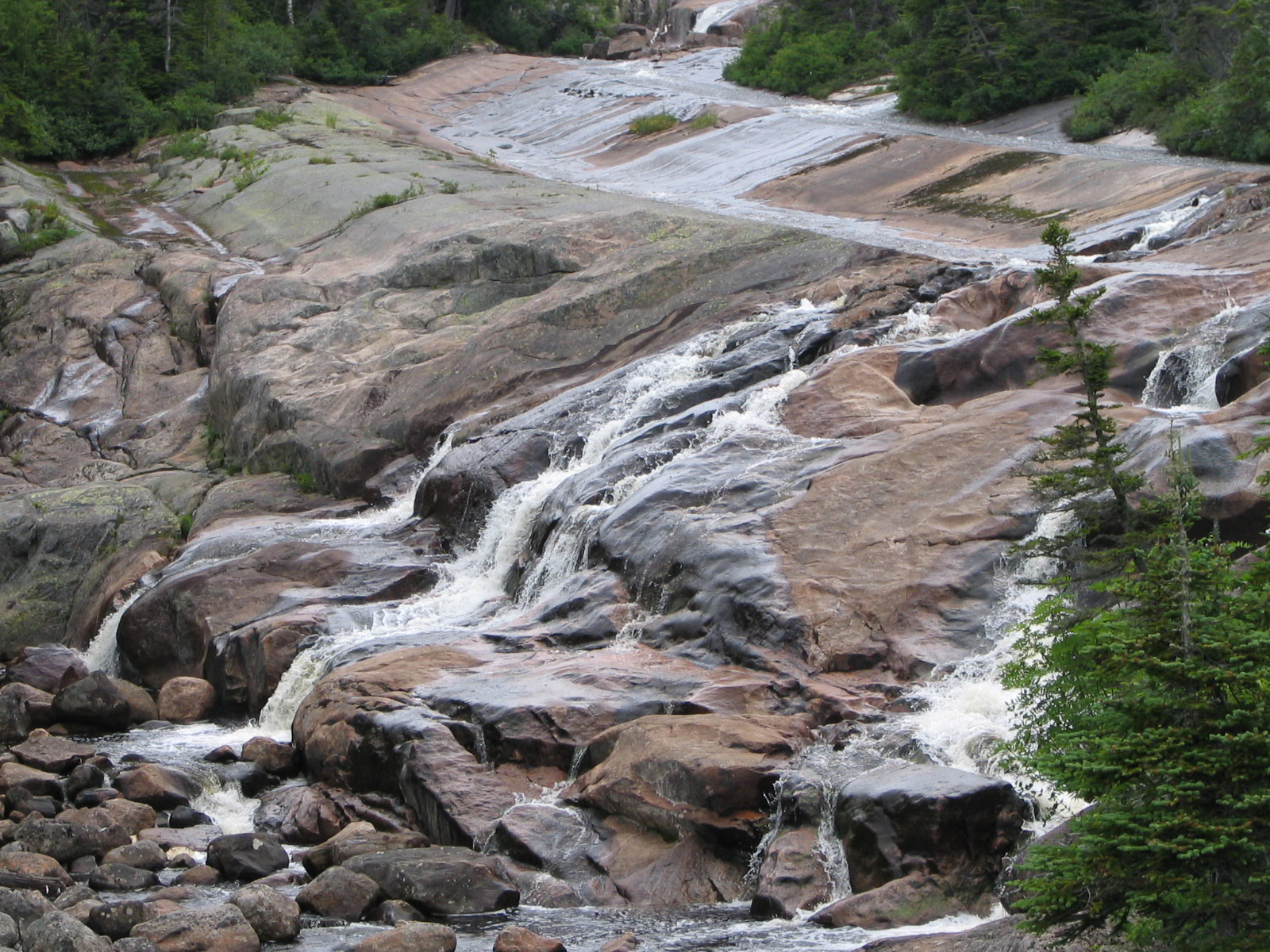
Glacial grooves in rock of the Canadian Shield where the Sault Plat River flows, Rivière-au-Tonnerre municipality, Quebec, Canada

== See also ==
- Chatter mark
- Striation (geology)
- Glacial polish
