= Charpeney (canton) =

Township in Quebec, Canada

The township Charpeney (French: Canton de Charpeney) is located in the unorganized territory of Lac-Jérôme, in the Minganie Regional County Municipality, in Côte-Nord, in the province of Quebec, in Canada.

== Geography ==
This uninhabited township is bounded by the rivière au Bouleau (located to the west) and the rivière à la Tortue (located to the east), in the Minganie RCM. The main body of water turns out to be Delaunay Lake.

== Toponymy ==
The toponym "canton Charpeney" appears in the 1921 edition of the work "Names Geographical of the Province of Quebec". This toponymic designation was attributed in recognition of the life work of Father Oblate Hyacinthe Auguste Charpeney (1822-1882), missionary on the North Shore in 1859–1860, while he was resident at the convent of Saint-Sauveur, in the city of Quebec.

The toponym "Canton Charpeney" was made official on December 5, 1968 at the Place Names Bank of the Commission de toponymie du Québec.

== See also ==
- Lac-Jérôme, an unorganized territory
- Delaynay Lake, a body of water
- Rivière au Bouleau, a stream
- Rivière à la Tortue, a stream
- Hyacinthe Auguste Charpeney
- List of Quebec cantons
