= Striation (geology) =

Groove, created by a geological process, on the surface of a rock or a mineral

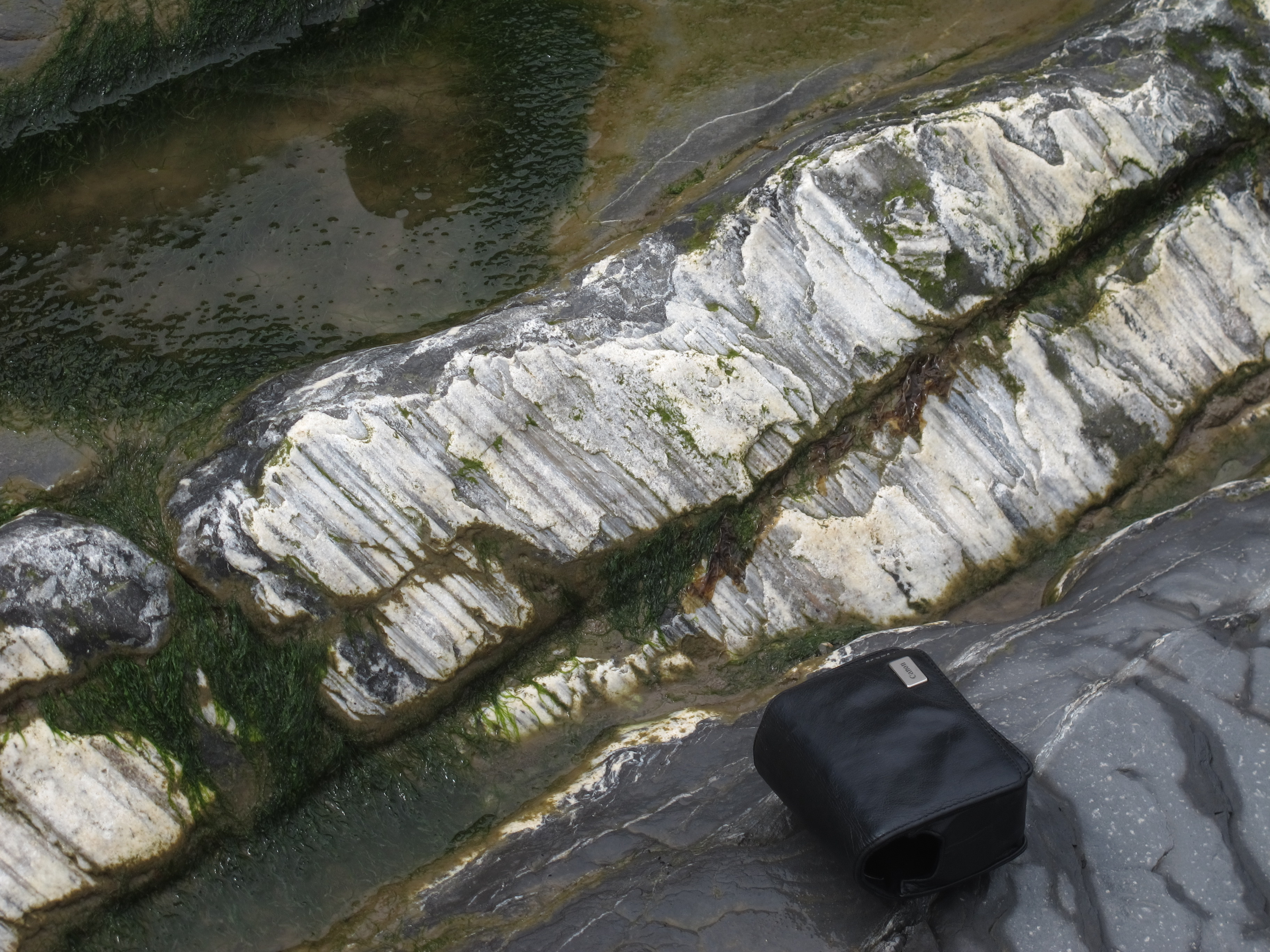
Striations (slickenfibres) on a fault surface near Kilve, England

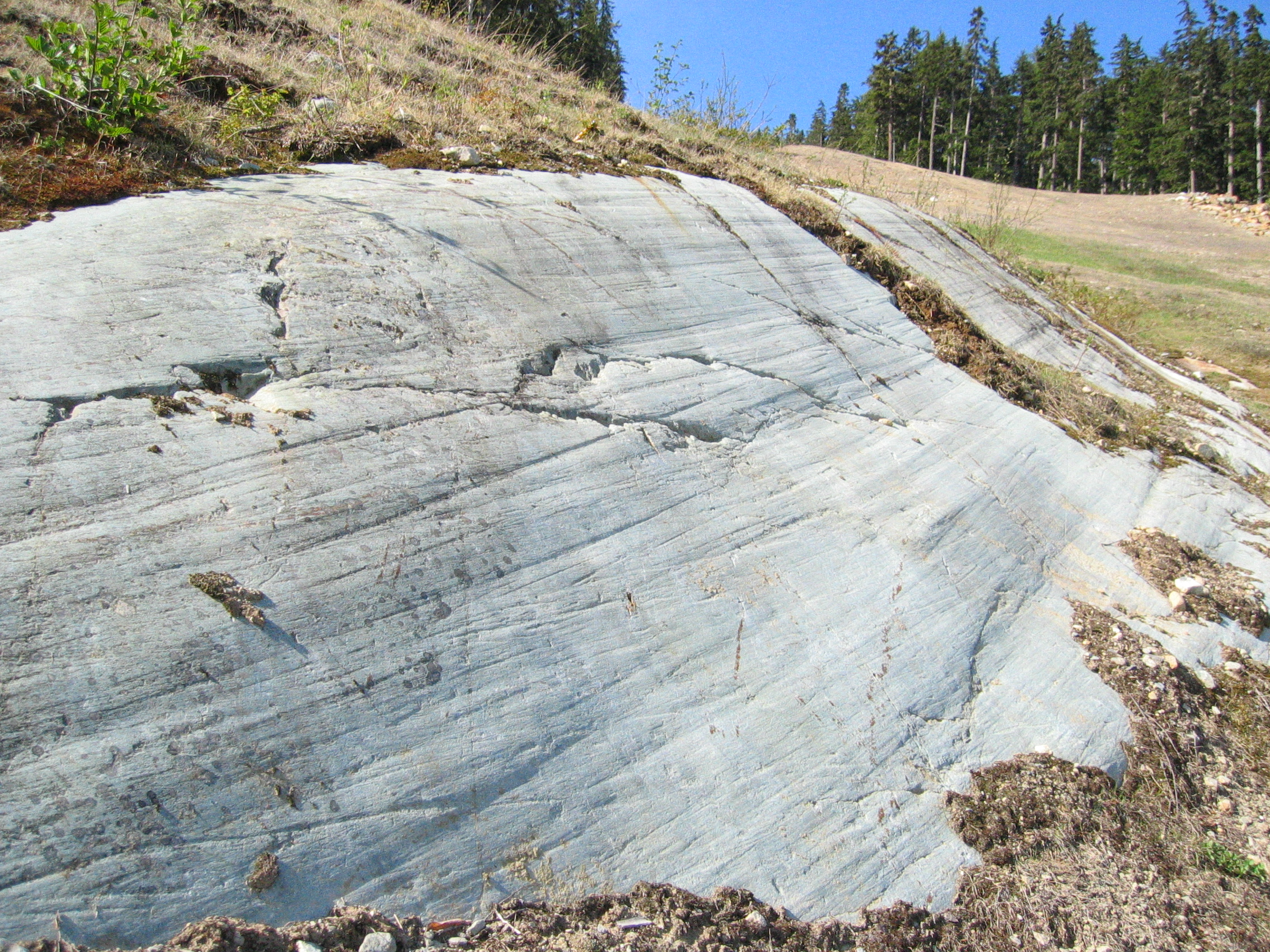
Glacial striations in Canada

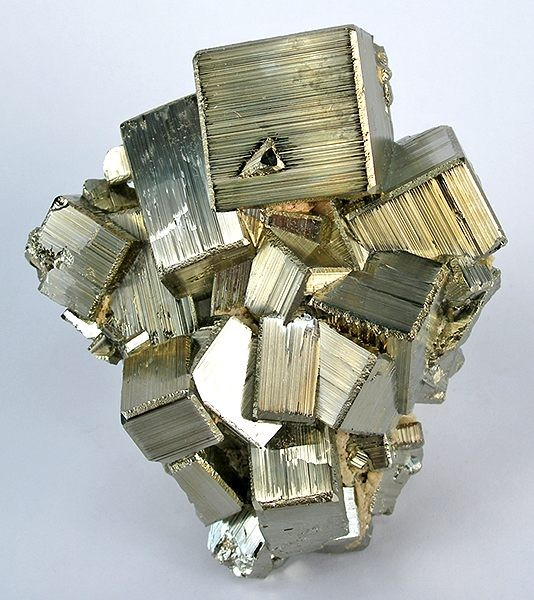
Striations on pyrite crystals

In geology, a striation is a groove, created by a geological process, on the surface of a rock or a mineral.

In structural geology, striations are linear furrows, or linear marks, generated from fault movement. The striation's direction reveals the movement direction in the fault plane.

Similar striations, called glacial striations, can occur in areas subjected to glaciation. Striations can also be caused by underwater landslides.

Striations can also be a growth pattern that looks like a set of hairline grooves, seen on crystal faces of certain minerals. Examples of minerals that can show growth striations include pyrite, feldspar, quartz, tourmaline, chalcocite and sphalerite.

== See also ==
- Slickenside
