= Lac Beauchamp =

Lake in Canada

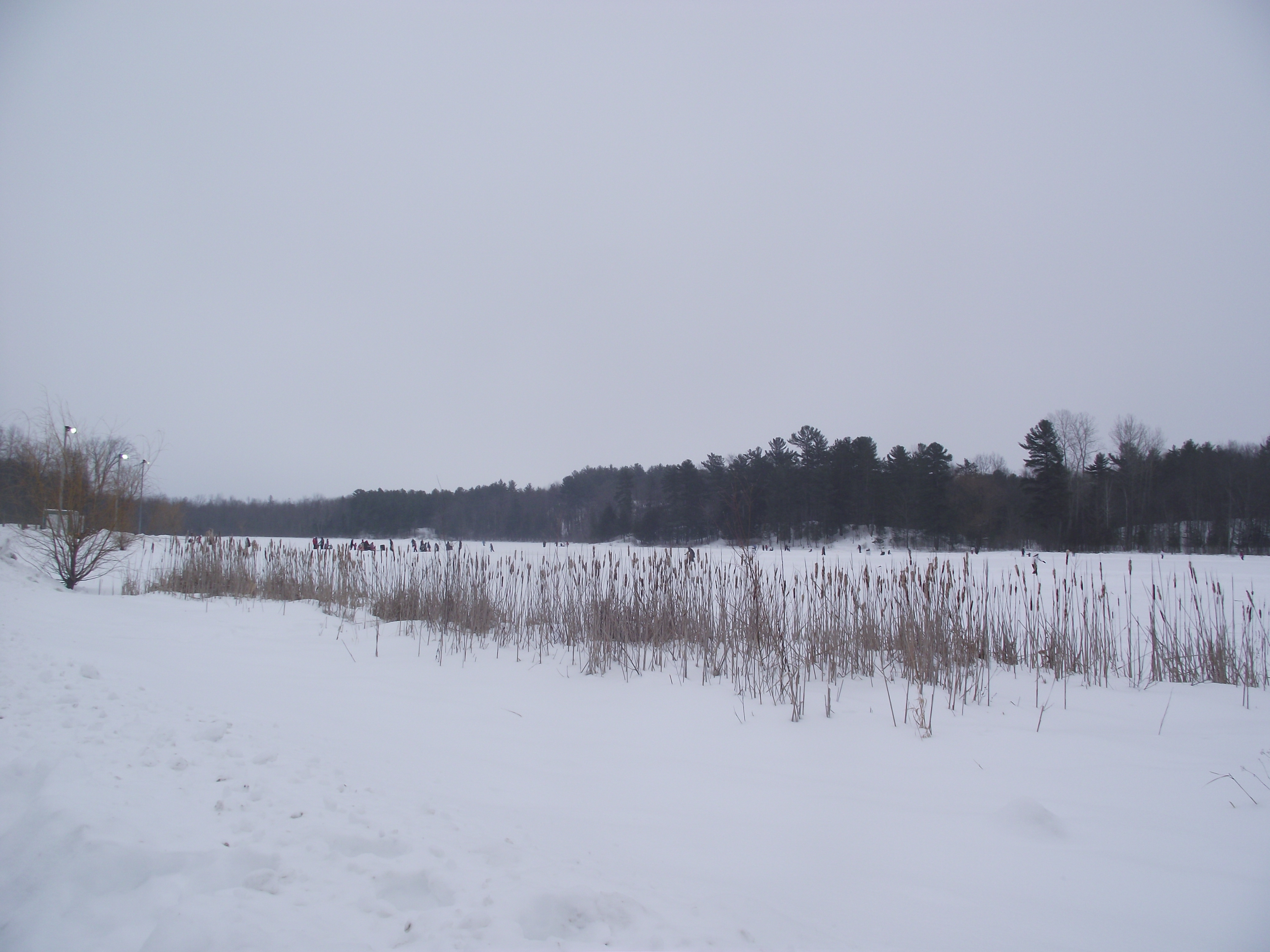
- Lake Beauchamp in winter
- Interactive map of Lac Beauchamp
- Location: Gatineau, Quebec
- Coordinates: 45°29′26.9″N 75°37′15.1″W
- Type: artificial lake
- Basin countries: Canada

Lac Beauchamp is an artificial lake located in Lac Beauchamp Park in Gatineau, Quebec, Canada.
