= Hyacinthe Auguste Charpeney =

Hyacnite Auguste Charpeney Hyacinthe Auguste Charpeney

Personal life
- Born: 12 March 1826 Le Grand-Serre, France
- Died: 23 May 1882 (aged 56) Montreal
- Resting place: Richelieu, Quebec
- Parents: Hyacinthe Charpeney (father); Virginie Sibert (mother)

Religious life
- Religion: Catholic
- School: Juniorat of Notre-Dame de Lumières (France)
- Profession: Parish priest, superior and provincial treasurer
- Ordination: 1845-08-14

Senior posting
- Based in: France

Hyacinthe Auguste Charpeney (March 12, 1826, Grand-Serre, France – May 23, 1982, Montreal) was a priest of the community of the Immaculate Oblates (omi), having worked in France, and in Canada notably as pastor, superior and provincial bursar.

== Biography ==
Hyacinthe Auguste Charpeney is the son of Hyacinthe Charpeney (draper) and Virginie Sibert. He studied at the juniorate of Notre-Dame de Lumières in 1840–1844. He took the habit on August 14, 1844 in Notre-Dame de l'Osier, a town in the region of Auvergne-Rhône-Alpes, in France. His oblation was on August 14, 1845. He was ordained a priest on June 24, 1849 by Monsignor Eugène de Mazenod.

Charpeney's first obedience lasted six years at Notre-Dame de Bon Secours, in the diocese of Viviers (1849-1859), in France. At the general council of the community of November 20, 1858, Charpeney was sent to Canada; his obedience to a foreign mission was assigned on December 14, 1858. He arrived in Canada in early 1859.

=== Mission to Canada from 1859 to 1882 ===
Upon his arrival in Canada, Charpeney resided in Quebec from 1859 to 1860. Historian J.-B.-A. Allaire wrote in 1910 that Charpeney was assigned to Labrador from 1859 to 1860. During this period, he made a few trips to the Côte-Nord which was then accessible only by sea. Monsignor Joseph-Eugène-Bruno Guigues assigned him to Montreal, where Charpeney practiced from 1860 to 1871 as attorney for the Saint-Pierre residence. In 1863, he worked as a local treasurer. Subsequently, he was superior and parish priest. The Oblate community appointed him as provincial bursar from 1865 to 1871. During the period from 1871 to 1877, Charpeney worked as pastor at the Convent of the Servants of Jesus-Mary of the Gray Nuns (of Ottawa)., as well as superior to Hull and vicar. Subsequently, he lived in Quebec City from 1877 to 1880, then in Montreal from 1880 to 1882.

Charpeney fell ill in April 1882 in Montreal. He died on May 23, 1882. His solemn funeral was celebrated in Saint-Pierre-Apôtre church in Montreal. His remains are buried in the Oblate cemetery at Richelieu, MRC of Rouville, in Montérégie.

Father Charpeney's name appears frequently in the magazine Missions O.M.I.

== Recognition ==
The township of Charpeney, on the North Shore, in Quebec, was designated in recognition of the life work of Hyacinthe Auguste Charpeney.

== Archives ==
The general archives of the Oblate community contain several documents relating to the life of Hyacinthe Auguste Charpeney: the oblation formula, around 50 letters addressed by Charpeney to Father Pierre Aubert (1865-1879), as well as some letters to Fathers Honorat, Martinet, Sardou, Vandengerghe, to Mgr Allard and to Mgr Faraud.

== See also ==
- Canton Charpeney
