= Glacial polish =

Rock surface type

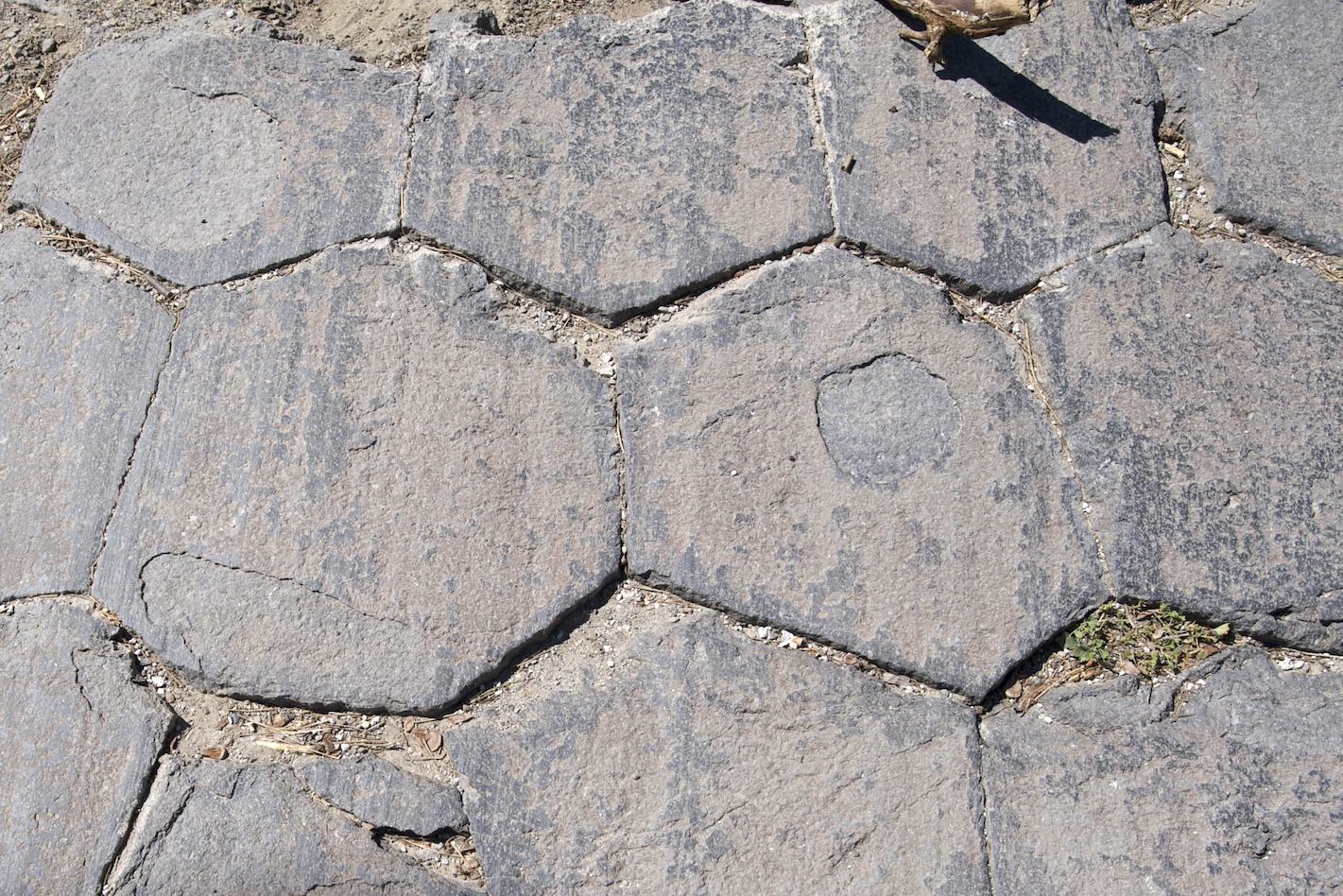
Glacial polish at Devils Postpile National Monument, Madera County, California, USA

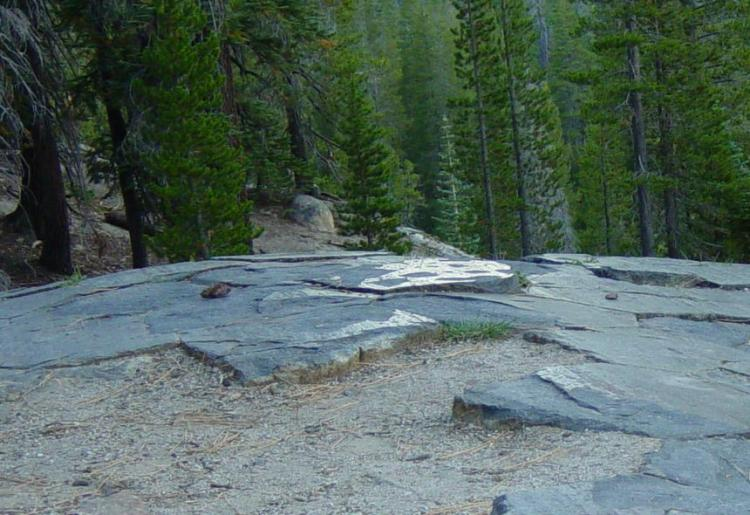
An example of glacial polish from Devils Postpile in the Sierra Nevada region

Glacial polish is a feature of rock surfaces that is typically associated with glacial striations.

This phenomenon is where glaciers have passed over bedrock, typically granite or other hard igneous or metamorphic rock. Moving ice will carry pebbles and sand grains removed from upper levels, grinding a smooth or grooved surface upon the underlying rock. The presence of such polish indicates that the glaciation was relatively recent (in geologic time scale) or was subsequently protected by deposition, as such polish will be subsequently lost due to weathering processes (such as exfoliation).

Considering some samples of glacial polish from sites such as Yosemite National Park, scientists have discovered that they developed thin coatings composed of tiny rock particles rather than rocks just being worn down solely from the movement of the glaciers. Over time, this coating contributes to the smoothness of the rocks. This coating also helps protect the polished rocks from natural processes such as weathering and erosion. This discovery has altered how scientists consider glaciers’ effect on land.

== Applications ==
Glacial polish has a significant role in studies for reconstructing ice flow direction, bedrock erosion, and glacial dynamics pertaining to Earth's geomorphic time record. New remote sensing technologies have been developed to study deep-time glaciations on a continental scale. With the increase in the affordability and availability of satellite imagery technology, glacial geomorphology is now possible. This advance allows for the further evaluation of past glaciations, and in addition, the technology provides analogs for studying current and future ice sheet behavior.

Currently, satellite and UAV Imagery has been used to study large-scale bedrock abrasions, which can be associated with glacial polish.

== Examples indicating glacial polish ==
In the Tassili N’Ajjer Plateau of Algeria, researchers mapped extensive striated pavements, which are smoothed and grooved bedrock surfaces formed by glacial erosion. This finding also indicates a south-to-north ice flow, which occurred during the Late Ordovician glaciation. Similarly, in Namibia, newly examined Late Carboniferous glacial landscapes reveal evidence of past ice sheet activity due to the preservation of polished and striated surfaces. In North Africa, satellite imagery has helped with mapping paleo-ice stream flowsets. These flowsets would have left behind glacially smoothed bedrock similar to modern glaciated terrains, which can be considered to indicate glacial polish. Additionally, there have been novel UAV-based investigations in Australia’s Cryogenian glacial landscapes. Here, subglacial erosion features provide opportunities for examples of ice sheet behavior over 600 million years ago. These examples demonstrate how glacial polish is an essential part of reconstructing ancient ice movements and understanding deep-time glacial geomorphology.

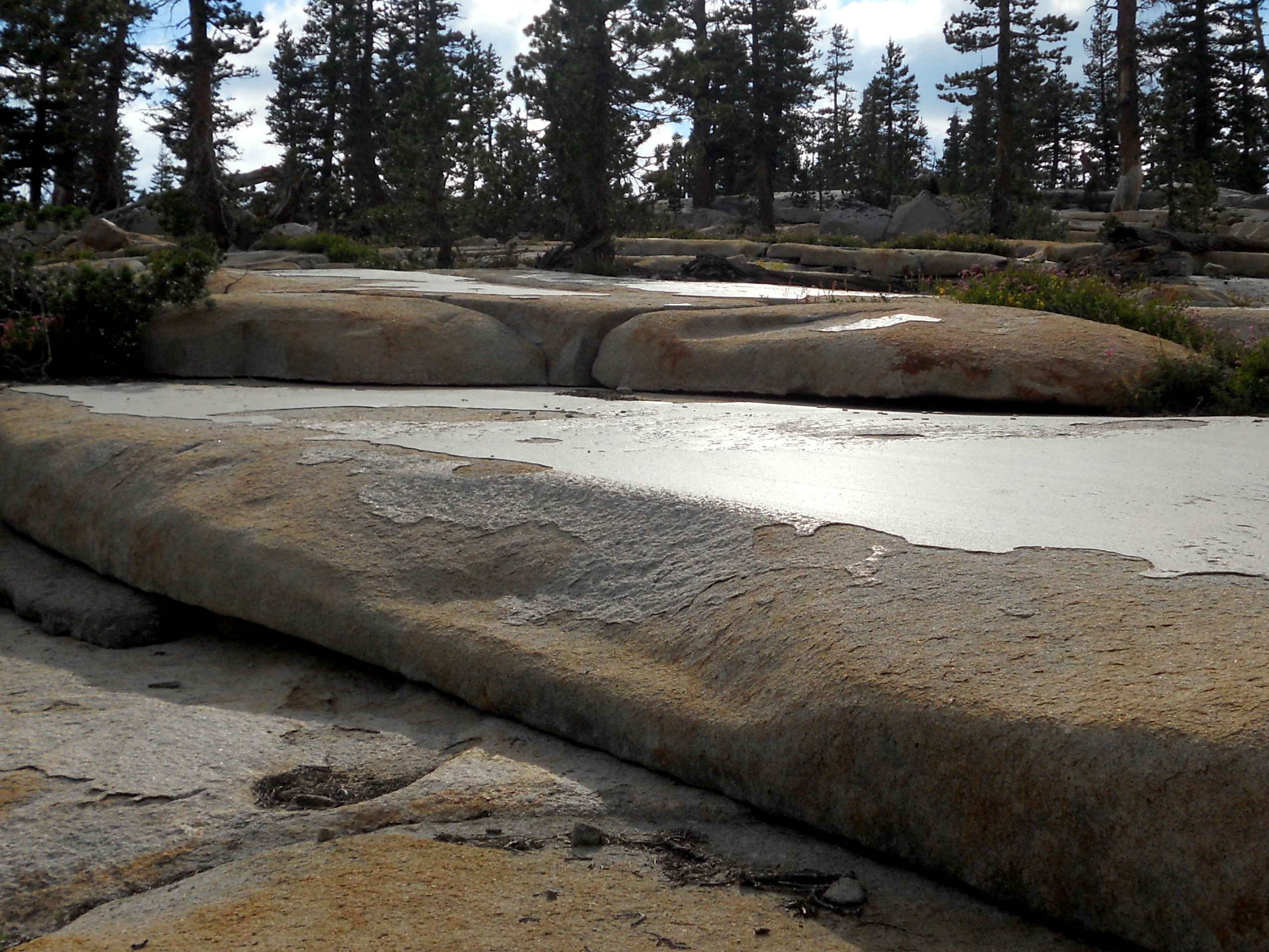
Low-angle sunlight illuminates glacial polish on granite. Emigrant Wilderness, Sierra Nevada, California, USA. Both flat and pockmarked polish surfaces are visible. The polish itself is a thin layer, some millimeters thick, that is being removed by weathering.

== See also ==
- Glacial striation
- Sierra Nevada
- Late Ordovician
- Late Carboniferous
- Cryogenian
