= Tonnerre River (Minganie) =

Au Tonnerre River Rivière au Tonnerre
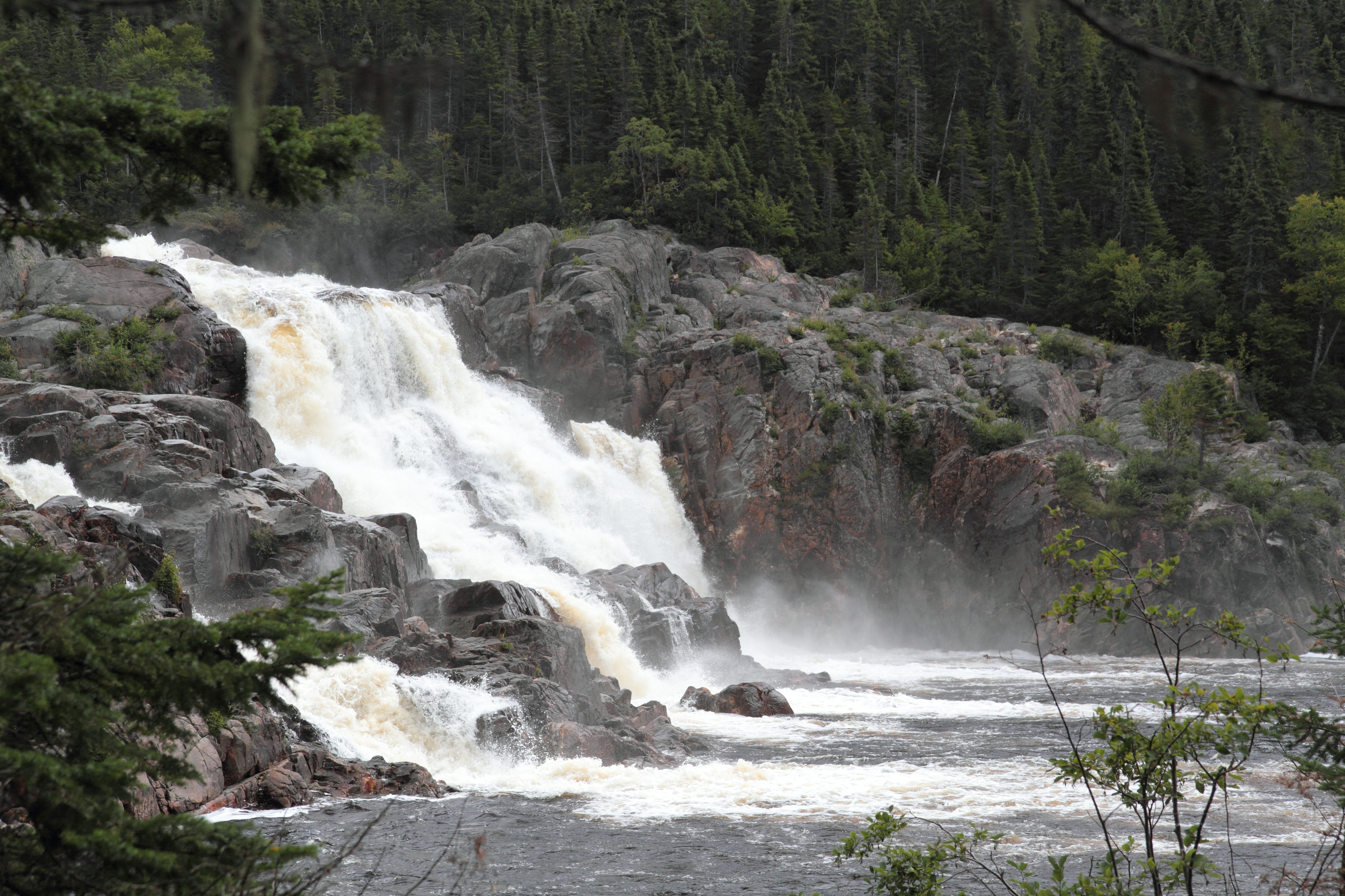
- Waterfall "Grand Sault" on "Tonnerre River"

- Location within Quebec
- Native name: U`suk `Sipo (Innu)

Location
- Country: Canada
- Province: Quebec
- Region: Côte-Nord
- RCM: Minganie

Physical characteristics
- Source: Unidentified Lake
  - location: MRC Minganie Regional County Municipality, Côte-Nord, Quebec
  - coordinates: 49°26′13″N 74°03′34″W
  - elevation: 484 m (1,588 ft)
- Mouth: Gulf of Saint Lawrence
  - location: Rivière-au-Tonnerre, Quebec, MRC Minganie Regional County Municipality, Côte-Nord, Quebec
  - coordinates: 50°16′25″N 64°46′46″W
  - elevation: 0 m (0 ft)
- Length: 85 km (53 mi)

Basin features
- Tributaries
  - left: Outlet of "lac Queue-de-Chat" and the "Lacs aux Erratiques".

The rivière au Tonnerre (English: Thunder River) is a watercourse that runs through the municipality of Rivière-au-Tonnerre, Quebec in the Minganie Regional County Municipality (RCM), in the Côte-Nord administrative region, in Quebec, in Canada. The course of the river crosses the township of Margane, then constitutes the boundary between the townships of Margane and Touzel until the confluence of the river with the North shore of the Gulf of Saint Lawrence.

== Location ==
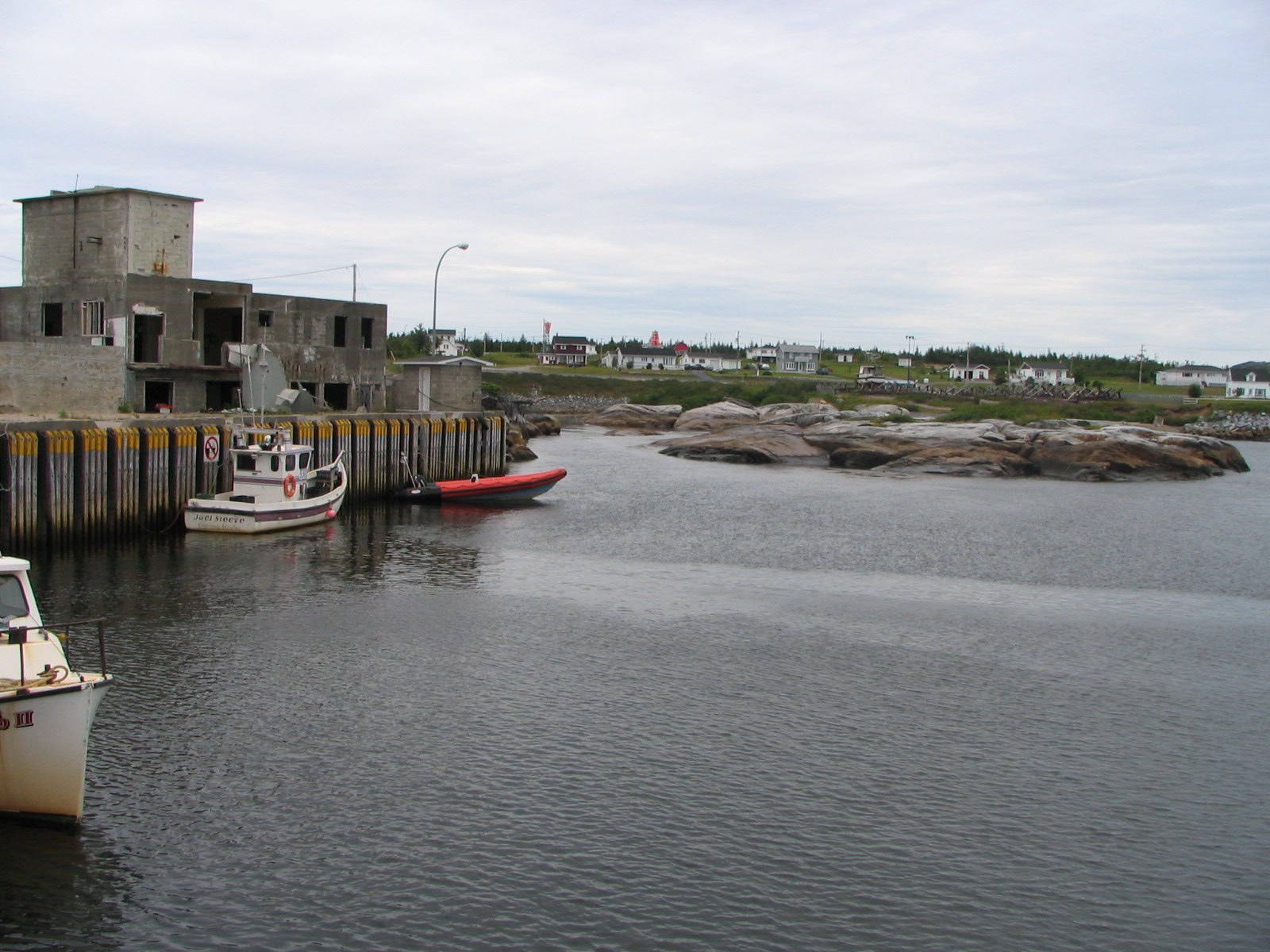
Fishermen's wharf, sheds, fishing boats and zodiac

The river flows south for 85 kilometres (53 mi) from a mountainous area 6 kilometres (3.7 mi) west of Lake Magpie. It has many rapids in its headwaters. The 30 metres (98 ft) Chute au Tonnerre (Thunder Falls) is 5 kilometres (3.1 mi) upstream from the mouth. The mouth of the river is located in the municipality of Rivière-au-Tonnerre in the Minganie Regional County Municipality. The widening at the mouth, which is halfway between Sept-Îles and Havre-Saint-Pierre, forms a natural harbor for small craft that is accessed from the sea through a narrow channel. The community of Rivière-au-Tonnerre is on both sides of the river mouth, which is crossed by Quebec Route 138.

The southern portion of the "Tonnerre River" hydrographic slope is served by Route 138 along the north shore of the Gulf of Saint Lawrence. The R0902 forest road (going north-west) serves the western part of this slope. The surface of the "Thunder River" is usually frozen from early November to the end of April, however, safe ice circulation is generally from late November to mid-April.

== Description ==
The Dictionnaire des rivières et lacs de la province de Québec (1914) describes the river as,

Situated on the north coast of the Gulf of Saint Lawrence, at 376 miles from Quebec. It is navigable by canoe to almost 40 miles from the first falls, which constitute a hydraulic power of a certain importance. At 34 miles from its mouth, according to the surveyor T. Simard (1890) there is a lake about 53 miles long. (Note: Presumably Simard is referring to Lake Magpie on the Magpie River, not far from the headwaters of the Au Tonnerre.) The lake, which is deep, much resembles, with its capes and mountains, the Saguenay River; it is full of pike. The river itself is excellent for salmon and trout. The land is almost everywhere sandy. The La Boutillier house, of Paspébiac, has founded a great fishing establishment here beside the river.

== Name ==
The Innu call the river U`suk `Sipo, meaning red-breasted merganser (Mergus serrator), a common bird species on the North Shore. This is spelled "Ouchigouchipi" in the maps by Jacques-Nicolas Bellin (1744) and Robert de Vaugondy (1755). In his 1776 map Captain Carver writes the name as "Ouchigoush-ipi". The spelling "Uhukuhîpu" has also been used by anthropologists. The name "Thunder R." appears on the 1853 map by Bouchette fils, and as "R. au Tonnere" on the maps by Taché (1870 and 1880).

== Basin ==
The river basin covers 692 square kilometres (267 sq mi). It lies between the basins of the Sheldrake to the west and the Jupitagon to the east. Part of the basin is in the unorganized territory of Lac-Jérôme and part in the municipality of Rivière-au-Tonnerre. A map of the ecological regions of Quebec shows the river basin is in sub-regions 6j-S, 6j-T and 6m-T of the east spruce/moss subdomain.

== See also ==
- Rivière-au-Tonnerre, Quebec,
- Minganie Regional County Municipality (RCM)
- Côte-Nord, administrative region
- List of rivers of Quebec

== Sources ==
- Portrait préliminaire de la zone de gestion intégrée de l'eau par bassin versant Duplessis (PDF) (in French), OBV Duplessis, April 2015
- Rivière au Tonnerre (in French), Commission de toponymie du Québec
- Rivière au Tonnerre, Natural Resources Canada
- Rouillard, Eugène (1914), "Au Tonnerre, (Rivière)", Dictionnaire des rivières et lacs de la province de Québec (in French), Québec. Département des terres et forêts
- Saucier, J.-P.; Robitaille, A.; Grondin, P.; Bergeron, J.-F.; Gosselin, J. (2011), Les régions écologiques du Québec méridional (PDF) (map), 4 (in French), Ministère des Ressources naturelles et de la Faune
