= Rivière-au-Tonnerre =

- Municipality
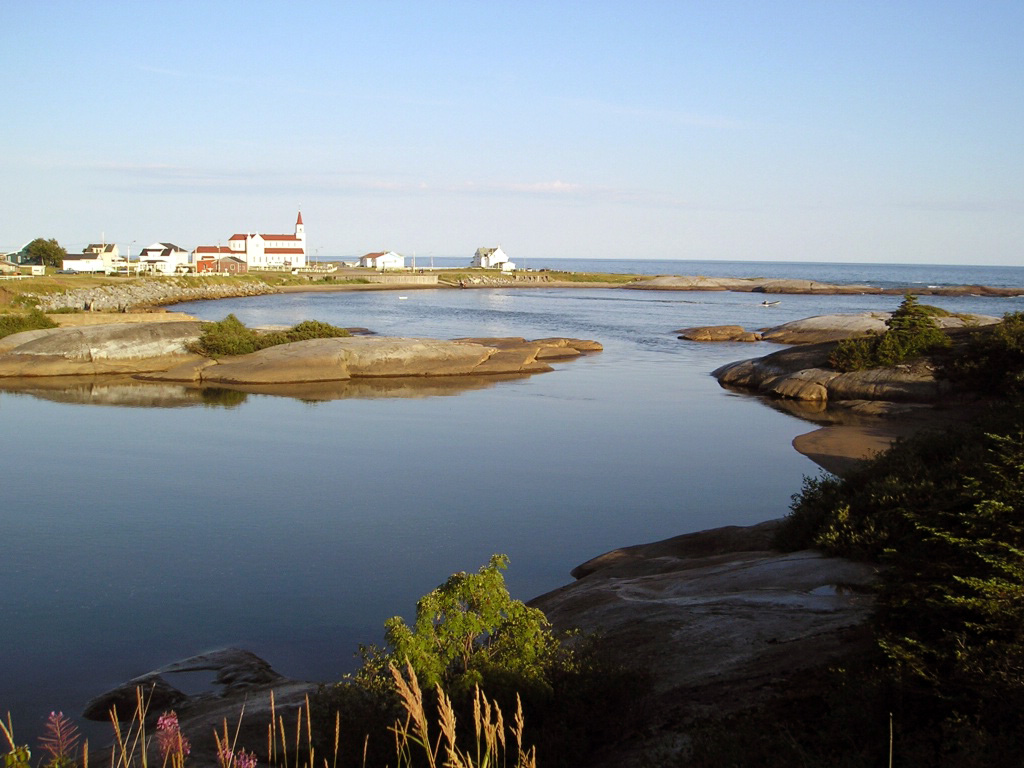
- Thunder river, Gulf of St. Lawrence

- Location in Côte-Nord region of Quebec
- Coordinates: 50°16′N 64°47′W
- Country: Canada
- Province: Quebec
- Region: Côte-Nord
- RCM: Minganie
- Settled: 1853
- Constituted: December 14, 1925

Government
  - Mayor: Jacques Bernier
  - Federal riding: Côte-Nord—Kawawachikamach—Nitassinan
  - Prov. riding: Duplessis

Area
  - Total: 641.71 km^{2} (247.77 sq mi)
  - Land: 605.14 km^{2} (233.65 sq mi)
- Elevation: 15.20 m (49.9 ft)

Population (2021)
  - Total: 281
  - Density: 0.5/km^{2} (1.3/sq mi)
  - Pop (2016-21): ▲0.7%
  - Dwellings: 326
- Time zone: UTC−5 (EST)
  - Summer (DST): UTC−4 (EDT)
- Postal code(s): G0G 2L0
- Area codes: 418 and 581
- Highways: R-138
- Website: www.riviere-au-tonnerre.ca

Rivière-au-Tonnerre (French pronunciation: [ʁivjɛʁ o tɔnɛʁ]), municipality located on the North shore of the Gulf of St. Lawrence, in Côte-Nord region, Minganie Regional County Municipality, in the province of Quebec, Canada.

Rivière-au-Tonnerre is member of Village rélais Quebec

== Toponymy ==
The eponymous Tonnerre River (Minganie) (French: Riviere au Tonnerre), which flows through the municipality, has a series of waterfalls at 5 kilometres (3.1 mi) upstream, from its mouth in the Gulf of St. Lawrence. These falls with a total drop of about 50 metres (160 ft) have a roar that reminds one of the noise caused by thunder. In the past, the place was nicknamed Boom Boom River.

== History ==
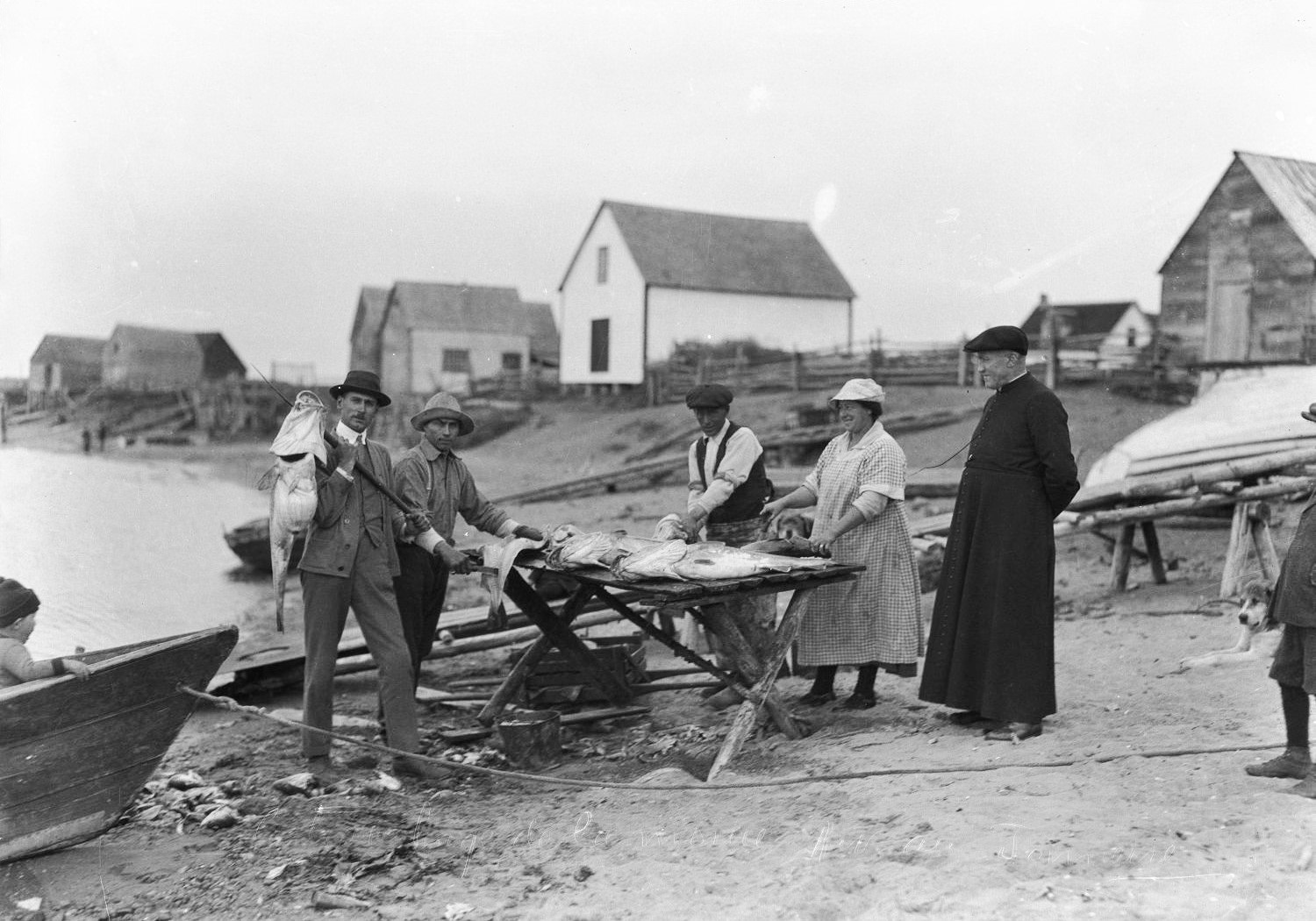
Cod processing in Riviere-au-Tonnerre, 1920s

The first permanent settlers arrived circa 1853 or 1854, and founded Sheldrake and Riviere-au-Tonnerre as fishing settlements. In 1875, more pioneers followed, originating notably from Paspébiac in the Gaspésie region. At the same time, the first chapel was built and the Parish of Saint-Hippolyte was formed. However it was commonly called Rivière-au-Tonnerre, like the settlement. In 1890, the post office opened under the English equivalent name of "Thunder River" (Frenchized in 1933). By 1908, there were 70 families engaged in agriculture. In 1925, the Municipality of Riviere-au-Tonnerre was formed.

In 1948, electricity was installed in the town, and in 1976, its isolation ended when Route 138 was officially opened between Sept-Îles and Sheldrake.

In 1988, its factory closed, leading to an exodus of its inhabitants.

== Geography ==
In addition to Riviere-au-Tonnerre itself, the communities within the municipality include the hamlets of Rivière-Pigou, Rivière-aux-Graines, and Sheldrake, all located along the Gulf of St. Lawrence and accessible via Quebec Route 138 (The Whale Route).

=== Climate ===
Rivière-au-Tonnerre has a subarctic climate (Dfc) with mild summers, rainy autumns and long, cold and snowy winters with annual snowfall averaging 99 inches (251 cm). Winter typically starts in late October or early November and lasts through most of, if not all of April.

Climate data for Rivière-au-Tonnerre
| Month | Jan | Feb | Mar | Apr | May | Jun | Jul | Aug | Sep | Oct | Nov | Dec | Year |
|---|---|---|---|---|---|---|---|---|---|---|---|---|---|
| Record high °C (°F) | 8.9 (48.0) | 7 (45) | 10.6 (51.1) | 18 (64) | 27 (81) | 27 (81) | 29 (84) | 29 (84) | 27.5 (81.5) | 19.4 (66.9) | 14 (57) | 9 (48) | 29 (84) |
| Mean daily maximum °C (°F) | −8.6 (16.5) | −6.5 (20.3) | −1.1 (30.0) | 4.2 (39.6) | 10.6 (51.1) | 16.1 (61.0) | 19.1 (66.4) | 18.5 (65.3) | 13.9 (57.0) | 8 (46) | 1.8 (35.2) | −5.1 (22.8) | 5.9 (42.6) |
| Daily mean °C (°F) | −14.2 (6.4) | −12 (10) | −6.3 (20.7) | 0.2 (32.4) | 5.8 (42.4) | 11.1 (52.0) | 14.4 (57.9) | 13.7 (56.7) | 9.4 (48.9) | 3.9 (39.0) | −2.2 (28.0) | −10.2 (13.6) | 1.1 (34.0) |
| Mean daily minimum °C (°F) | −19.8 (−3.6) | −17.5 (0.5) | −11.4 (11.5) | −3.8 (25.2) | 1 (34) | 6.2 (43.2) | 9.7 (49.5) | 8.9 (48.0) | 4.8 (40.6) | −0.3 (31.5) | −6.3 (20.7) | −15.4 (4.3) | −3.7 (25.3) |
| Record low °C (°F) | −40 (−40) | −33.9 (−29.0) | −32 (−26) | −27 (−17) | −12 (10) | −3.3 (26.1) | −1 (30) | −1.1 (30.0) | −5.6 (21.9) | −15 (5) | −25 (−13) | −42 (−44) | −42 (−44) |
| Average precipitation mm (inches) | 68.6 (2.70) | 51.5 (2.03) | 72.2 (2.84) | 86.6 (3.41) | 92.8 (3.65) | 101.3 (3.99) | 99 (3.9) | 97.8 (3.85) | 120.9 (4.76) | 118 (4.6) | 91.4 (3.60) | 80.4 (3.17) | 1,080.3 (42.53) |
| Average rainfall mm (inches) | 11.3 (0.44) | 10.1 (0.40) | 29 (1.1) | 71 (2.8) | 90.4 (3.56) | 101.3 (3.99) | 99 (3.9) | 97.8 (3.85) | 120.9 (4.76) | 116 (4.6) | 67 (2.6) | 15.1 (0.59) | 828.9 (32.63) |
| Average snowfall cm (inches) | 57.3 (22.6) | 41.4 (16.3) | 43.2 (17.0) | 15.5 (6.1) | 2.3 (0.9) | 0 (0) | 0 (0) | 0 (0) | 0 (0) | 1.9 (0.7) | 24.4 (9.6) | 65.4 (25.7) | 251.4 (99.0) |
Source: Environment Canada

== Demographics ==
=== Population ===
Canada census – Rivière-au-Tonnerre community profile

| | 2021 | 2016 | 2011 |
| Population | 281 (+0.7% from 2016) | 279 (-9.1% from 2011) | 307 (-21.3% from 2006) |
| Land area | 605.14 km^{2} (233.65 sq mi) | 619.24 km^{2} (239.09 sq mi) | 619.20 km^{2} (239.07 sq mi) |
| Population density | 0.5/km^{2} (1.3/sq mi) | 0.5/km^{2} (1.3/sq mi) | 0.5/km^{2} (1.3/sq mi) |
| Median age | 60 (M: 60, F: 59.6) | 57.9 (M: 60.1, F: 55.0) | 55.2 (M: 56.2, F: 53.5) |
| Private dwellings | 326 (total) 157 (occupied) | 302 (total) 150 (occupied) | 335 (total) |
| Median household income | $57,200 | $48,256 | $.N/A |

Notes: 2011 income data for this area has been suppressed for data quality or confidentiality reasons.
References: 2021 2016 2011

Historical Census Data - Rivière-au-Tonnerre, Quebec

| Year | Pop. | ±% |
|---|---|---|
| 1921 | 465 | — |
| 1931 | 509 | +9.5% |
| 1941 | 882 | +73.3% |
| 1951 | 847 | −4.0% |
| 1956 | 895 | +5.7% |
| 1961 | 940 | +5.0% |

| Year | Pop. | ±% |
|---|---|---|
| 1966 | 827 | −12.0% |
| 1971 | 589 | −28.8% |
| 1976 | 587 | −0.3% |
| 1981 | 603 | +2.7% |
| 1986 | 606 | +0.5% |
| 1991 | 526 | −13.2% |

| Year | Pop. | ±% |
|---|---|---|
| 1996 | 476 | −9.5% |
| 2001 | 415 | −12.8% |
| 2006 | 390 | −6.0% |
| 2011 | 307 | −21.3% |
| 2016 | 279 | −9.1% |
| 2021 | 281 | +0.7% |

Source: Statistics Canada

=== Language ===
Canada Census Mother Tongue - Rivière-au-Tonnerre, Quebec
| Census | Total | French | | | English | | | French & English | | | Other | | |
| Year | Responses | Count | Trend | Pop % | Count | Trend | Pop % | Count | Trend | Pop % | Count | Trend | Pop % |
| 2011 | 305 | 305 | ▼21.8% | 100.00% | 0 | 0.0% | 0.00% | 0 | 0.0% | 0.00% | 0 | 0.0% | 0.00% |
| 2006 | 390 | 390 | ▼6.0% | 100.00% | 0 | 0.0% | 0.00% | 0 | 0.0% | 0.00% | 0 | 0.0% | 0.00% |
| 2001 | 415 | 415 | ▼11.7% | 100.00% | 0 | 0.0% | 0.00% | 0 | 0.0% | 0.00% | 0 | 0.0% | 0.00% |
| 1996 | 470 | 470 | n/a | 100.00% | 0 | n/a | 0.00% | 0 | n/a | 0.00% | 0 | n/a | 0.00% |

== Local government ==
List of former mayors:

- Honoré Bezeau (1926–1943)
- Élie Boudreau (1943–1949)
- Arthur Beaudin (1949–1957, 1961–1963)
- Walter Bond (1957–1960)
- John Anglehart (1960–1961)
- Delphis Lebrunb (1963–1971)
- Julien Bourque (1971–1978, 1981–1983)
- Réjean Boudreau (1978–1981, 1983–1985, 1987–1990)
- Régis Moreau (1985–1986)
- Rénald Lapierre (1986–1987, 1990–1995, 2001–2005)
- Leonilda Duguay (1995–1998)
- Carmine Leblanc (1998–1999)
- Renaud Touzel (1999–2001)
- Jeannot Boudreau (2005–2013)
- Aline Beaudin (2013–2017)
- Lorenza Beaudin (2017–2020)
- Jacques Bernier (2020–present)

== Built heritage ==
=== Saint-Hippolyte church ===
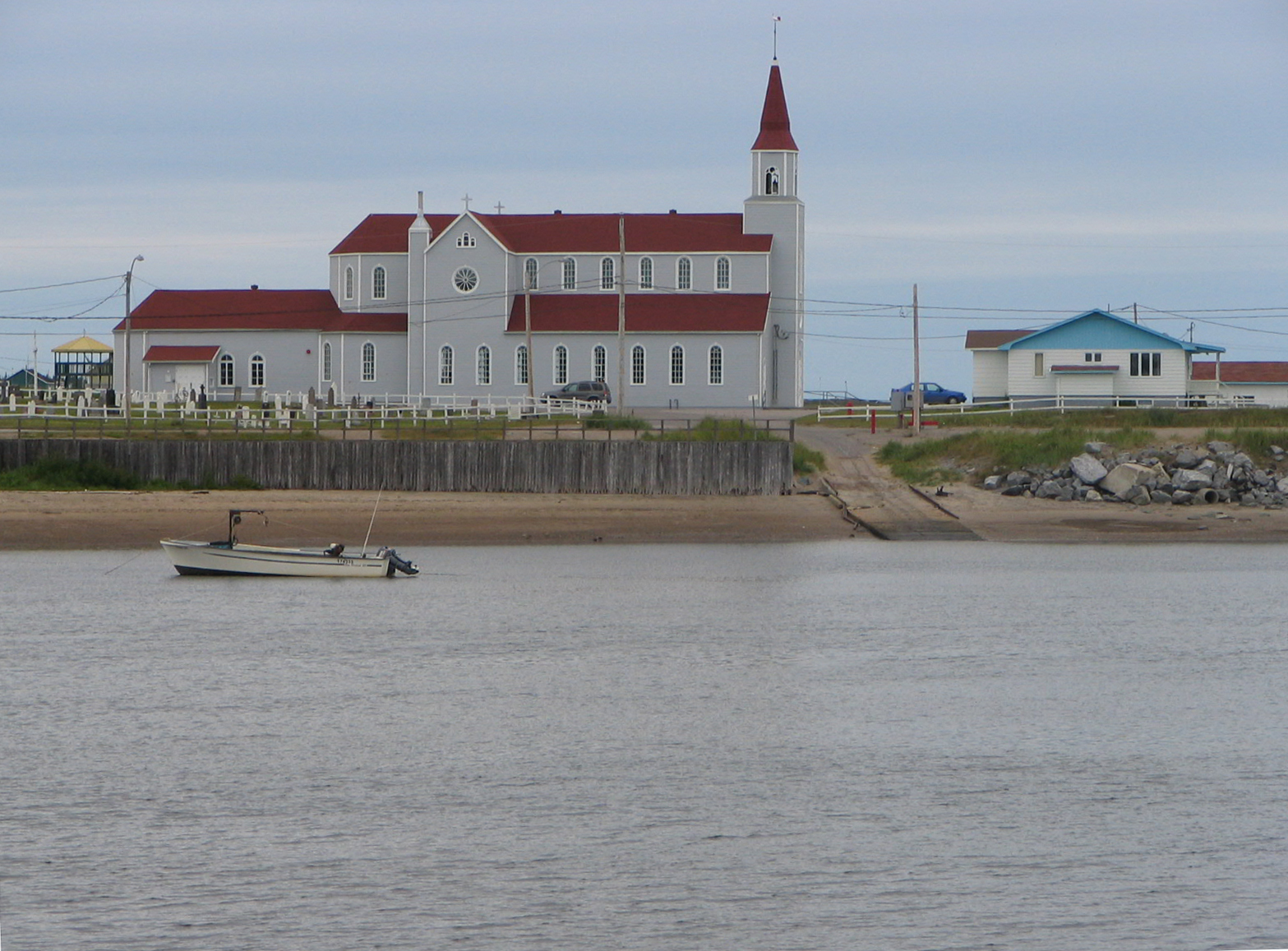
Saint-Hyppolyte Parish Church, at the mouth of the Thunder River

The Saint-Hippolyte Roman Catholic church makes Rivière-au-Tonnerre famous. This Catholic place of worship is of heritage interest for its architectural value: historical, landscape and social.

The religious building was built between 1905 and 1912, according to the plans of Eudist Father Joseph Hesry from Normandy, the architectural style was inspired by his native region, in France.

Two residents of Rivière-au-Tonnerre, John Cody and James Boudreau, supervised the construction, several members of the community participated in the construction and the making of the ornamentation that decorated the interior of the place of worship.

In the 1960s, the cladding of the exterior envelope of the church was changed from wood planks to asbestos shingles. In recent decades, the covering has reverted to the original shiplap wood planks. The exterior of the church has been almost unchanged since then, giving this Catholic place of worship an excellent state of authenticity.

=== Fishermen's Wharf ===
In 1990, the Department of Public Works and Government Services Canada rebuilt the Fishermen's Wharf by the Grandmont Bridges and Viaducts Company at a cost of $1,509,000 CAD. The mouth of the Thunder River is a natural harbour giving access to the Gulf of St. Lawrence.

The main and almost exclusive local economic activity is crab fishing. A factory which processes the crab meat sustains the bulk of the population.

== Transportation ==
=== By the sea ===
When the first permanent settlement arrived by sea, there was no road. In winter, harsh weather conditions, combined with ice, block access to the sea, and the mission, for months. The various obstacles were not insurmountable for the pioneers, a transport system was set up by cométique, i.e. by sled dogs.

=== Sled dogs ===
Until 1957, in winter, the survival of the inhabitants of Rivière-au-Tonnerre depended on the transport system by dog sled and the use of snowshoes.

For the people of Quebec's North Shore, the dog sled, or cométique, was a vehicle used to transport people, equipment and mail in winter over long distances. Originally, it was equipped with two driftwood or bone runners on which a series of sleepers in a similar material were placed.

=== Bush aviation ===
In Canada, bush aviation appeared at the end of the First World War (1914-1918). With its many lakes and rivers, Côte-Nord shore offered landing pads for seaplanes in the summer and ski-equipped aircraft in the winter. In the 1930s, it became possible to charter a bush plane and fly almost anywhere. Rivière-au-Tonnerre was serviced by planes belonging to the company Les Ailes du Nord et Pacifique Canadienne.

Means of transportation over time

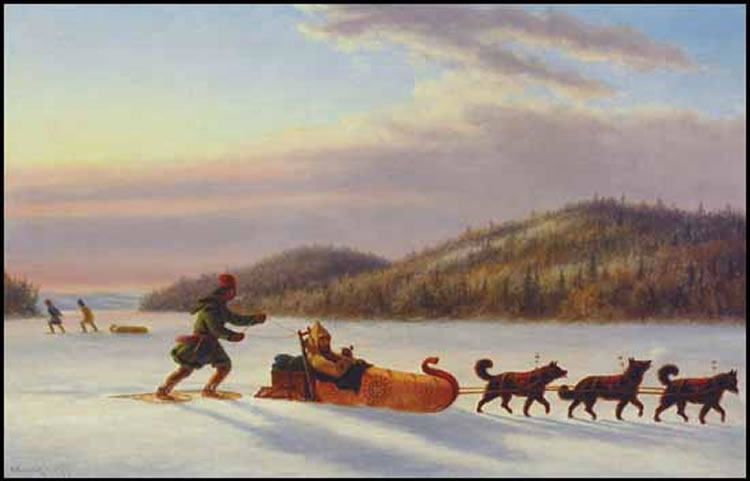
Fur Trader in Toboggan oil painting by Cornelius Krieghoff, (1815 – 1872).

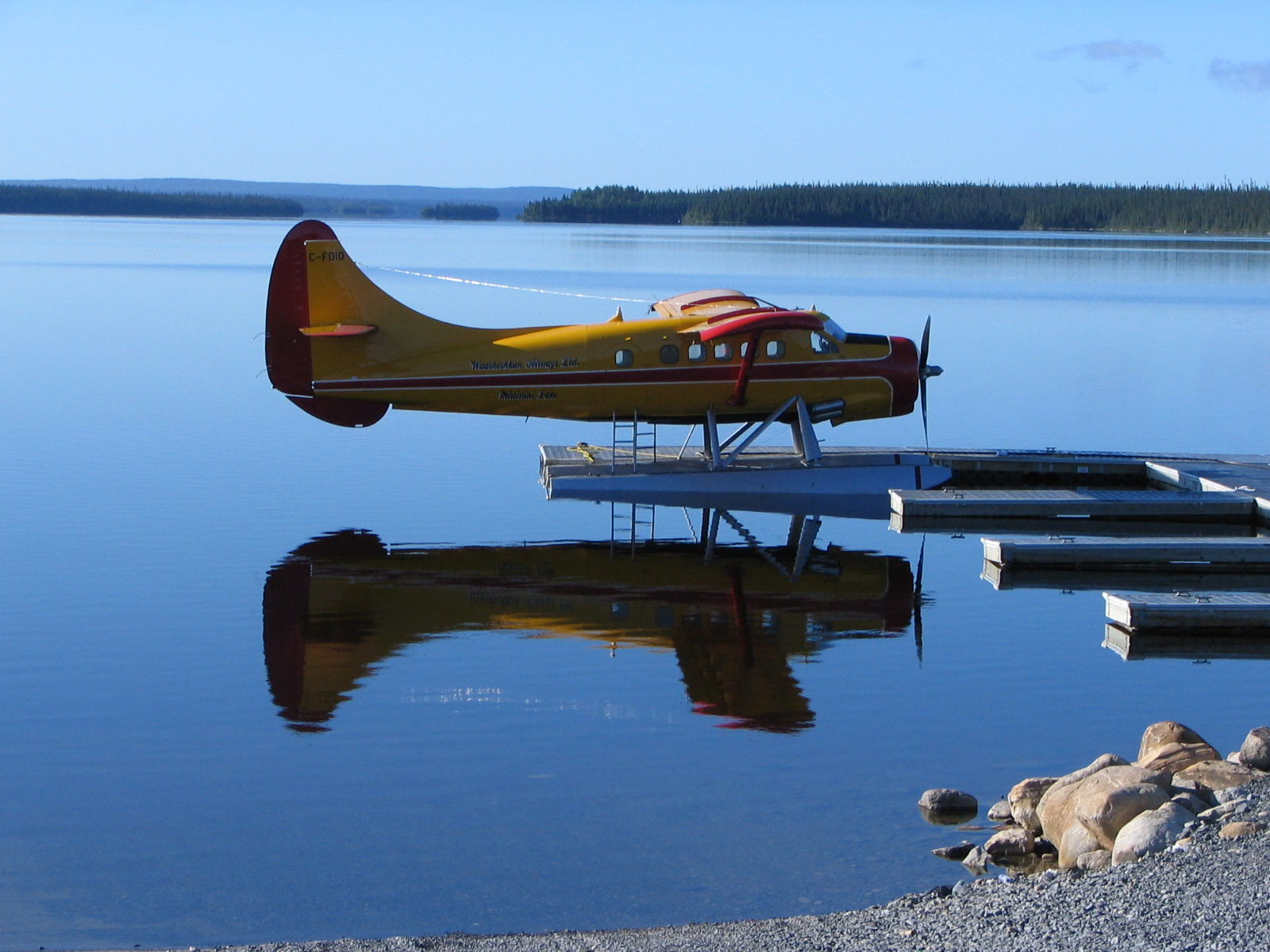
Nine-passenger Nordic seaplane operated by Waasheshkun Airways Ltd, Mistissini, 2005

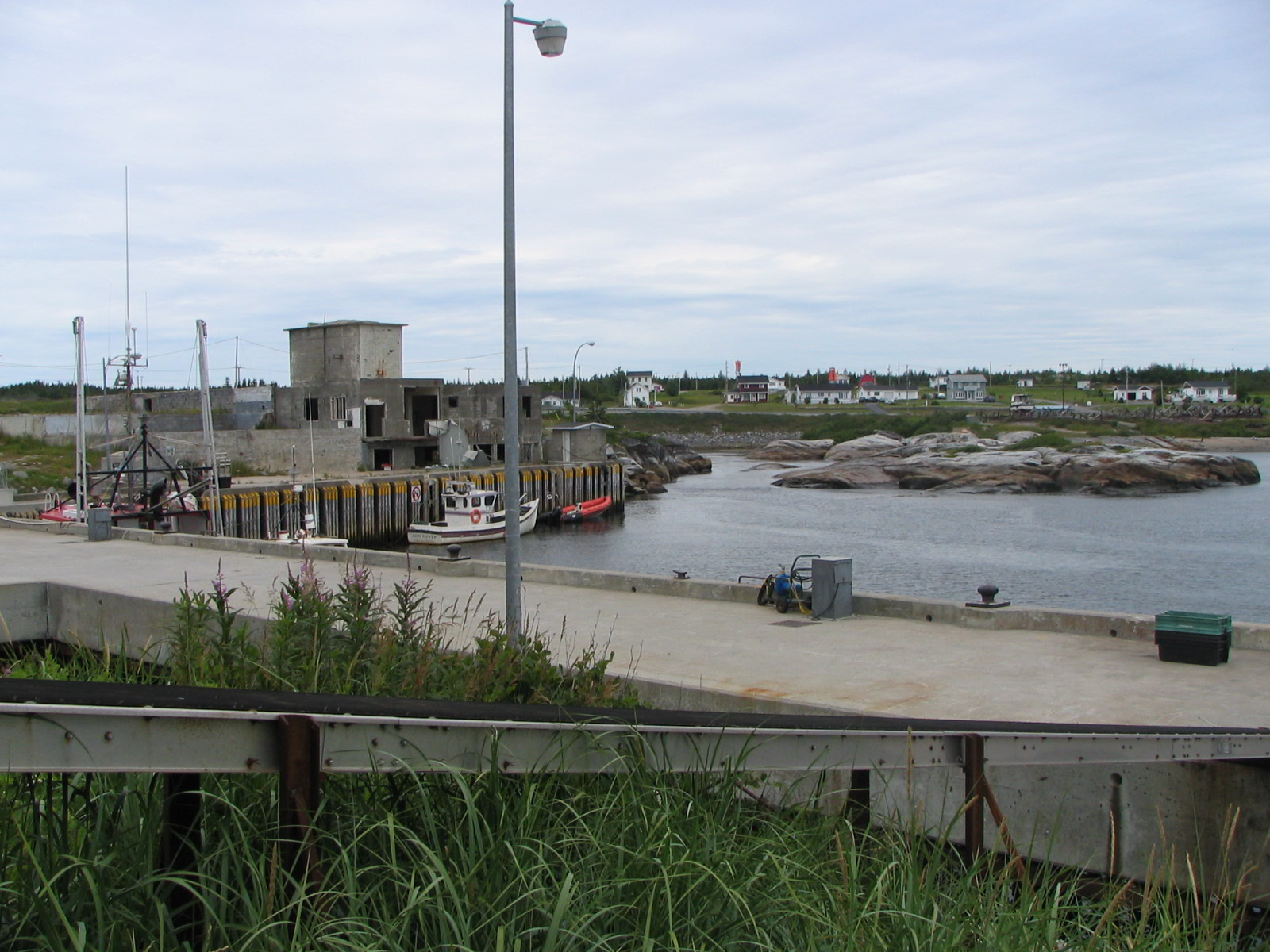
Fishermen's wharf, sheds, fishing vessels and zodiac, Tonnerre River

== See also ==
- Sault Plat River, exceptional geological site
- On Manitou River, west of Bouleau River, is the dramatic Manitou Falls, near the Quebec road 138.
