= MV Apollo =

Passenger ferry built in 1970

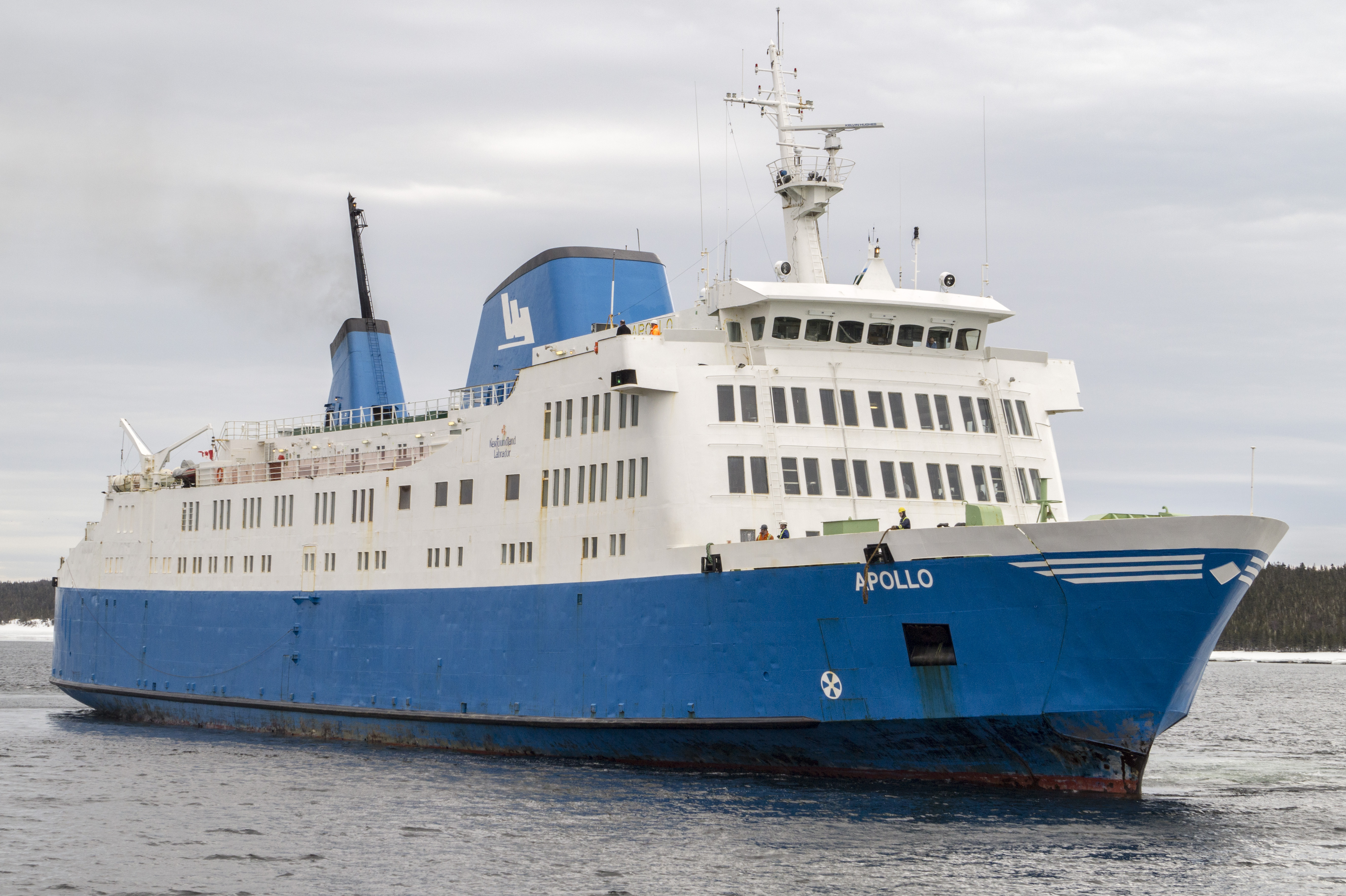
- MV Apollo preparing to dock in Newfoundland.

History
- Name: Apollo (1970–1976); Olau Kent (1976–1980); Gelting Nord (1980–1984); Benodet (1984–1985); Corbière (1985–1995); Apollo (1995–2021)
- Owner: Rederi AB Slite (1970–1976); Olau Line (1976–1980); Nordisk Faergefart (1980–1990); Brittany Ferries (1984–1985); Rederiaktiebolaget Eckerö (1990–2000); Labrador Marine (2000–2021)
- Port of registry: Slite, Sweden (1970–1976); Ribe, Denmark (1976–1980); Faaborg, Denmark (1980–1984); Nassau, Bahamas (1984–1991); Tallinn, Estonia (1991–1994); Nassau, Bahamas (1994–2000); St. John's, Newfoundland, Canada (2000–2021)
- Builder: Meyer Werft, Papenburg, Germany
- Cost: SEK 25 million
- Yard number: 0560
- Launched: 19 December 1969
- Sponsored by: Isabella Myrsten
- Completed: 2 May 1970
- Maiden voyage: 1970
- In service: 1970–2019
- Identification: IMO number: 7006314; MMSI number: 316002070; Call sign: CFG6209 (current)
- Fate: Scrapped at Aliağa, Turkey in 2021.

General characteristics (as built)
- Type: Passenger ferry
- Length: 108.7 m (356 ft 8 in)
- Beam: 17.2 m (56 ft 5 in)
- Draught: 4.6 m (15 ft 1 in)
- Depth: 6 m (19 ft 8 in)
- Installed power: 2 × 4,000 bhp (3,000 kW) 12 cyl. Klöckner-Humboldt-Deutz SBV 12M 350 diesel engines 1982 re-engined with 2x 4,500 bhp (3,400 kW) MAN 9L32/36 diesel engines
- Propulsion: 2 shafts; controllable pitch propellers
- Speed: 18.5 knots (34.3 km/h; 21.3 mph)

General characteristics (current)
- Type: Passenger ferry
- Tonnage: 6,609 GT; 1,982 NT; 1,100 DWT
- Length: 108.7 m (356 ft 8 in)
- Beam: 17.2 m (56 ft 5 in)
- Draught: 4.6 m (15 ft 1 in)
- Depth: 6 m (19 ft 8 in)
- Ice class: 1A
- Installed power: From 1982, 2 × 4,500 bhp 9 cyl. MAN/B&W 9L32/36
- Propulsion: 2 shafts; controllable pitch propellers
- Speed: 18.5 knots (34.3 km/h; 21.3 mph)

MV Apollo was a vehicle/passenger ferry that previously serviced the route between St. Barbe, Newfoundland and Labrador and Blanc-Sablon, Quebec, Canada.

== History ==
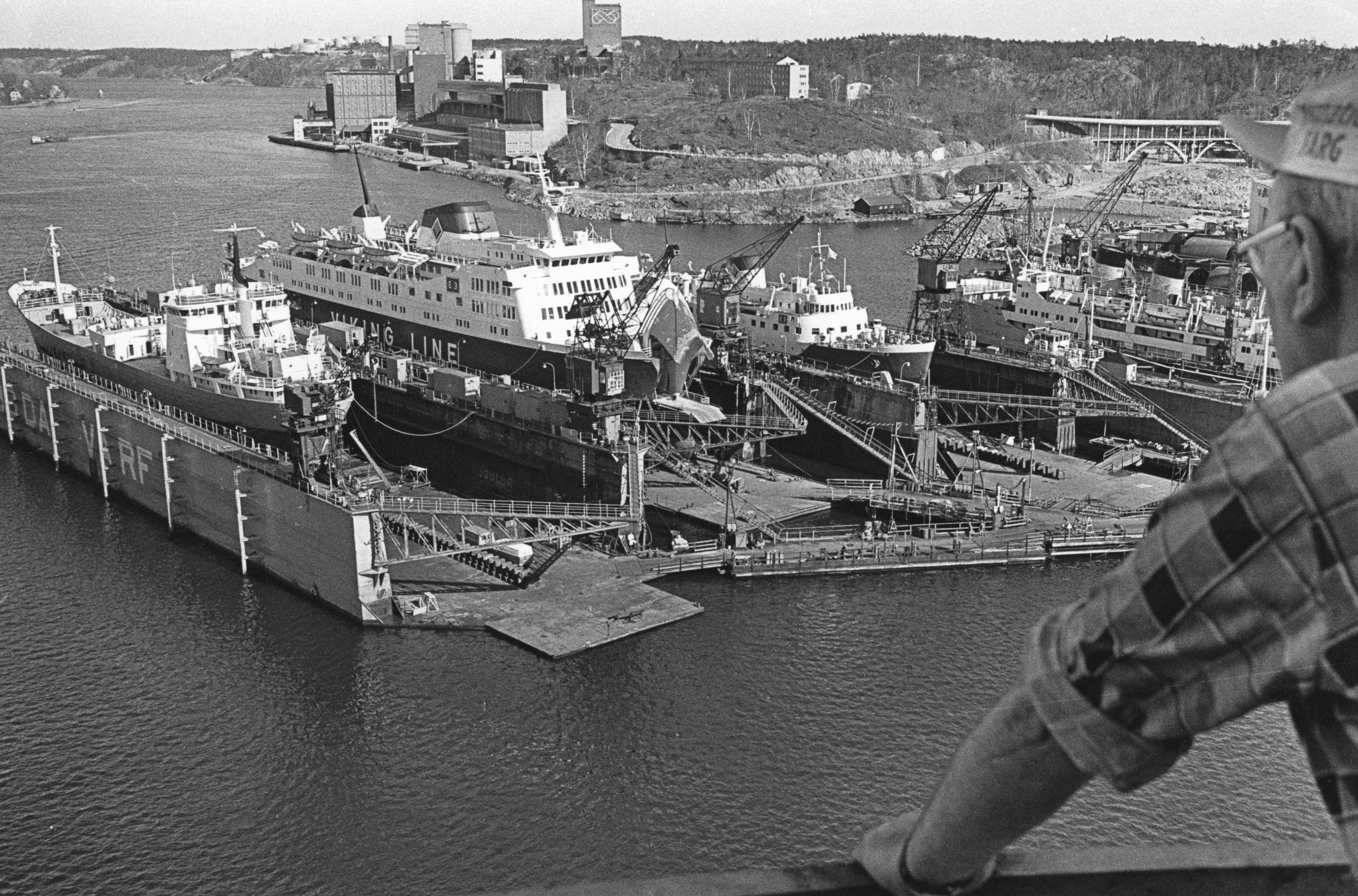
Apollo at a drydrock in 1972.

Apollo was originally built for Rederi Ab Slite of Sweden in 1970. She was put into service for Viking Line from Kapellskär, Sweden, to Naantali, Finland, via Mariehamn on Åland. In 1975 the route was changed to Stockholm–Mariehamn. In 1976, she was sold to Olau Line for its service between Sheerness, England, and Vlissingen, Netherlands, and was renamed Olau Kent, before returning to Scandinavia in 1981 as Gelting Nord of Danish operator Nordisk Færgefart. In 1984, she was chartered to Brittany Ferries as Benodet, before moving to sister company British Channel Island Ferries in 1985 as Corbière, and then to Truckline Ferries in 1989. In the early 1990s, she was sold to Rederi Ab Eckerö and moved back to the Baltic Sea serving between Helsinki and Tallinn, first for Tallink, under the marketing name Linda 1, and from 1995 for Eckerö Line and reverting to her original name of Apollo. After some further charters in the late 1990s, in 2000 Apollo was sold to the Woodward Group of Newfoundland and Labrador, Canada, entering service with its Labrador Marine subsidiary.

== Service with Labrador Marine ==
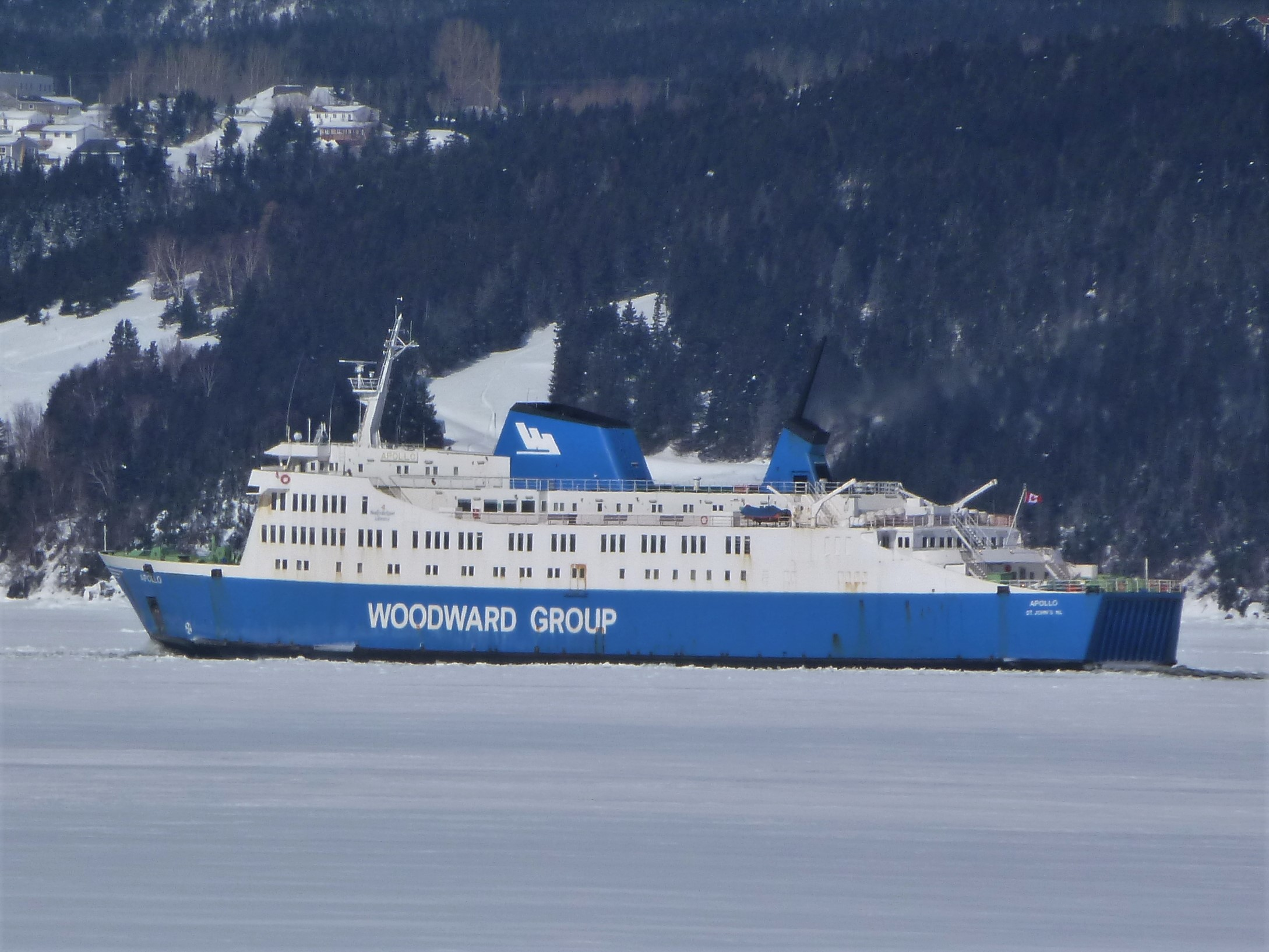
MV Apollo departing from Corner Brook in March 2015.

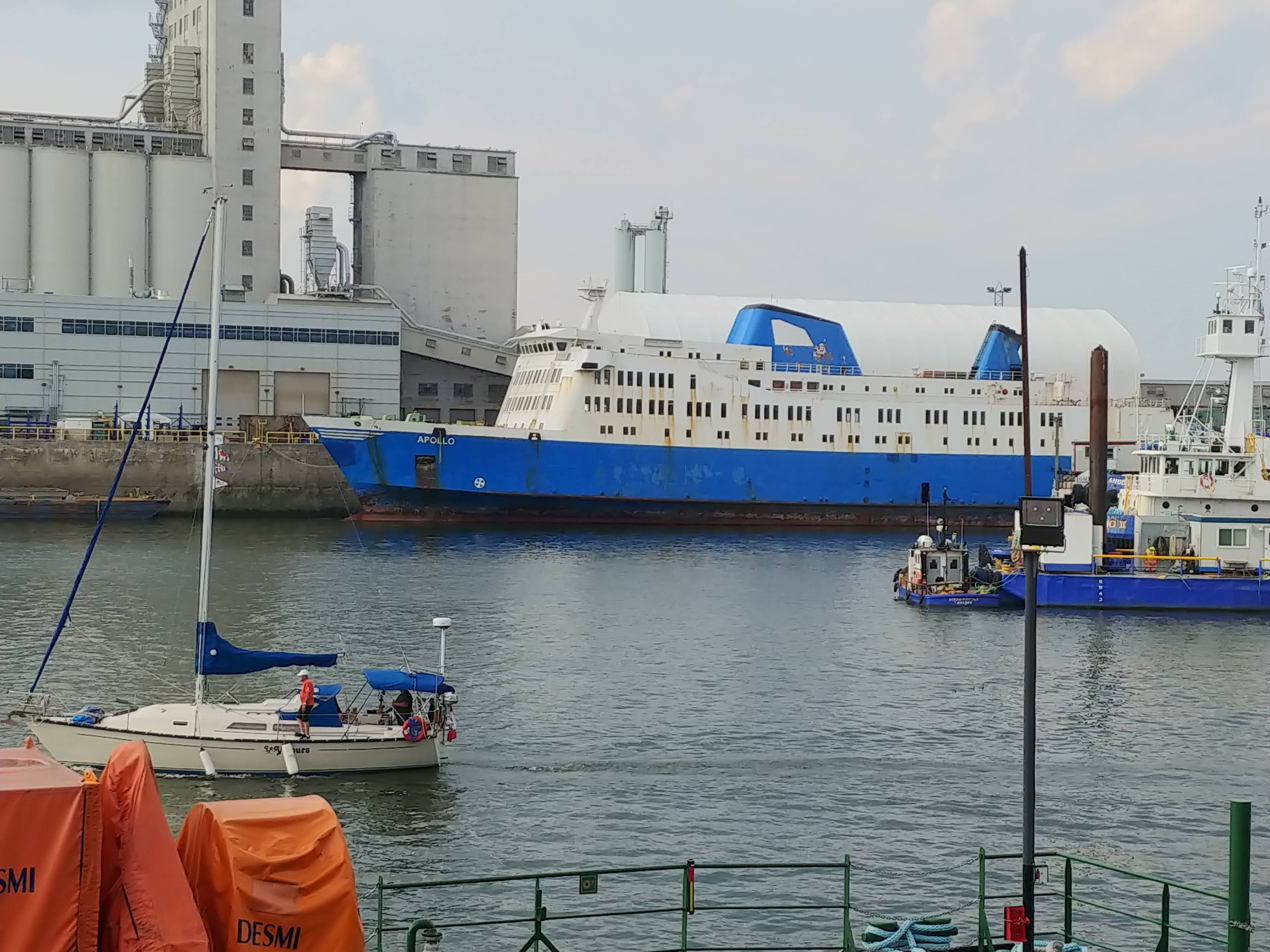
Apollo laid up at Quebec in 2020.

Apollo typically operated across the Strait of Belle Isle between St. Barbe, Newfoundland and Blanc-Sablon, Quebec, close to the border with Labrador. Winter ice conditions sometimes prevent Apollo from entering the harbour at St. Barbe, and service is provided from the Newfoundland port of Corner Brook instead, resulting in a crossing time of 12 hours rather than 1 hour 45 minutes.

In January 2008, Apollo suffered a minor engine room fire.

On 13 April 2017, Apollo became stuck in ice in the Strait of Belle Isle near Blanc-Sablon, Quebec for nearly 30 hours with 70 passengers on board. The Canadian Coast Guard vessel CCGS Henry Larsen was sent to aid the ferry and escorted Apollo to port once she was free of the ice. Sailings were cancelled on 14 April, but the vessel returned to normal service following the incident. On 19–20 April, all sailings by the ferry were cancelled due to severe ice conditions in the strait.

In February 2019 the ship crashed into the landing dock in Godbout, Quebec, tearing a hole in the ship's bow. She crashed again the following month at a wharf across the river in Matane, Quebec. She was permanently removed from service after the two crashes. Plans were established to sink the vessel to create an underwater diving attraction, but asbestos was discovered on the ship and the project proved impractical. In October 2019, while the ship was costing $30,000 per month to keep the ship docked at a facility in Quebec City, it was announced that the vessel would be scrapped. MV Qajaq W, formerly MV Grete, replaced Apollo on the Strait of Belle Isle crossing in early 2019. Apollo was finally scrapped in September 2021 at Aliaga in Turkey.
