= Blanc-Sablon (disambiguation) =

Blanc-Sablon is a municipality in Quebec, Canada.

Blanc-Sablon may also refer to:

== Places ==
- Blanc-Sablon Bay, Quebec, Canada

== See also ==
- Lourdes-de-Blanc-Sablon Airport, in Blanc-Sablon, Quebec
