= Anchor Point, Newfoundland and Labrador =

Anchor Point
- Town
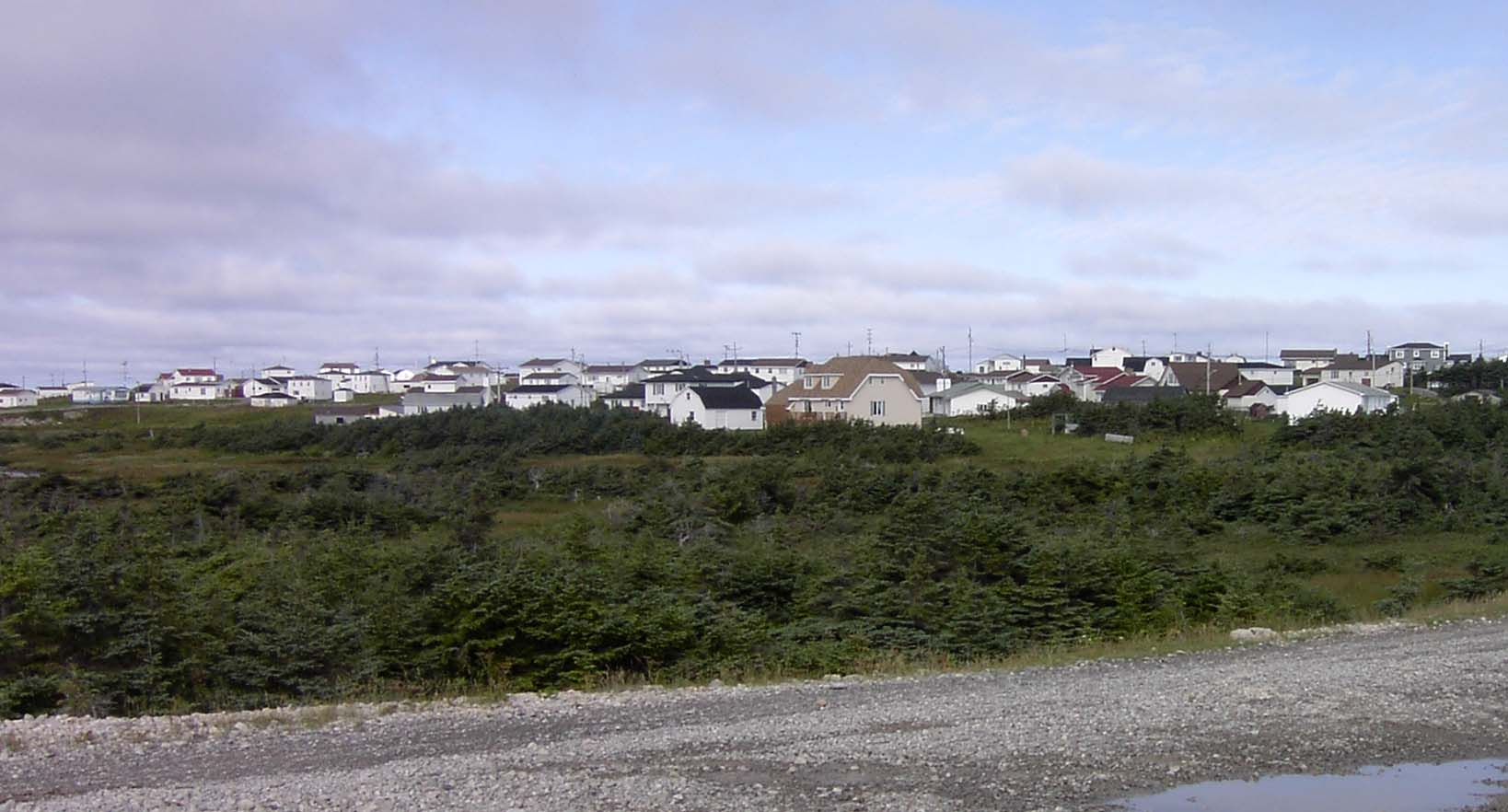
- Anchor Point's south side

- Location of Anchor Point in Newfoundland
- Coordinates: 51°14′14″N 56°47′39″W
- Country: Canada
- Province: Newfoundland and Labrador

Government
  - Mayor: Gerry Gros

Area
  - Total: 2.41 km^{2} (0.93 sq mi)

Population (2021)
  - Total: 305
  - Density: 130.2/km^{2} (337/sq mi)
- Time zone: UTC-3:30 (Newfoundland Time)
  - Summer (DST): UTC-2:30 (Newfoundland Daylight)
- Area code: 709
- Highways: Route 430

Anchor Point (2021 Population 305) is a town located in St. Barbe Bay, south of Flower's Cove on the west side of the Great Northern Peninsula, in Newfoundland and Labrador, Canada. It was the first English settlement on what is called the 'French Shore' of Newfoundland.

== History ==
Anchor Point was first settled by Robert Bartlett, a British seaman, and his nephew Robert Genge, both from Yeovil, Somerset, England in 1740. They used the cove as a base for fishing and fur hunting from Anchor Point to Bartlett's Harbour in the late 18th century. Robert Bartlett eventually returned to England while Robert Genge was joined by his brother Abram, who employed men from England seasonally to sell his furs and fish to American vessels. Trapping, salmon fishing and sealing were very important industries of Anchor Point in the 19th century. His descendant, William Genge, was the first Waymaster in 1885. By the 1850s, Anchor Point was established as a commercial center for fur trading and fishing on the St. Barbe coast. The land around Anchor Point was also very productive with excellent pasture which led to extensive cultivation of the land and the raising of livestock.

In 1848, an English Bishop visited the Northern Peninsula. It was at this time that the first cemetery on the Strait of Belle Isle was consecrated in Anchor Point. By 1849, a schoolhouse was built. However, because of its isolation, Anchor Point had difficulty retaining teachers. Therefore, from the 1850s to the 1950s, educational facilities remained relatively poor. By 1960, there was a larger elementary school and high school available in neighbouring Flower's Cove so that students could be bused to it. By the 1970s, all students attended school there. Also in the 1970s, the first Anglican church at Anchor Point was built.

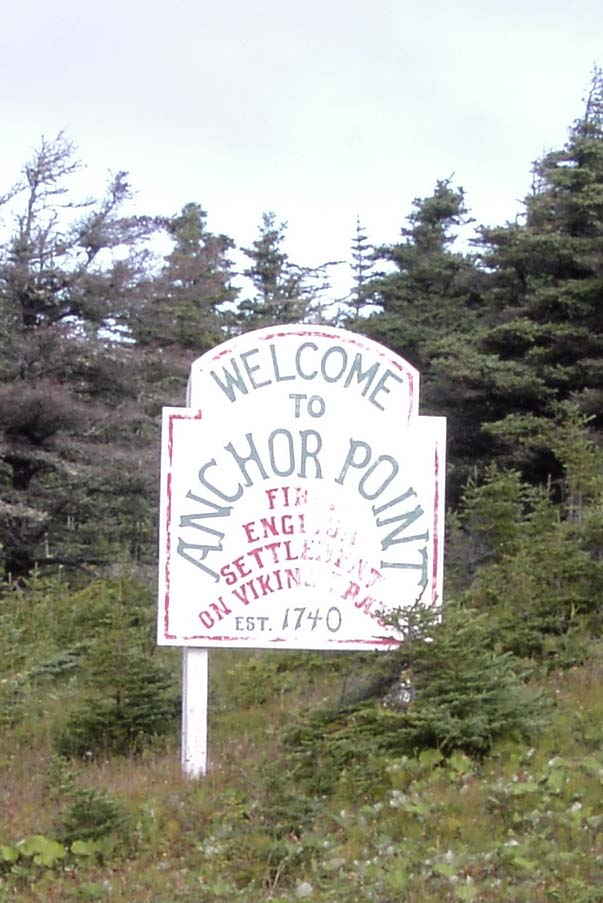
Highway welcoming sign

Seal hunting, salmon fishing and fur trapping would eventually become less profitable. By the 1920s, cod, lobster and herring fishing had become increasingly important. The population grew steadily from 51 people in 1911, 160 people in 1951, 208 in 1956, and 329 by 1976. The first Postmistress was Mrs. Susan Pilgrim on October 1, 1959.

Starting in 1980, a fish plant was operating seasonally for four months of the year. The plant shipped fish packed in ice daily to Port Aux Basques for distribution.

== Present ==
Anchor Point's population had been steadily declining since the demise of the cod fishery in Newfoundland. Many people from Anchor Point had left to find work in mainland Canada. However, new housing developments on the fringes of the town have brought in some additional residents. The lobster, shrimp and scallop fishery industries are still functioning as well as other available smaller fisheries and fur trading. The community has no general stores operating. Basic amenities (food/fuel) must be obtained in neighbouring towns.

== Demographics ==
Historical populations Anchor Point, NL
Year	Pop.	±%
1951	160	—
1956	208	+30.0%
1961	223	+7.2%
1966	238	+6.7%
1971	275	+15.5%
1976	329	+19.6%
1981	368	+11.9%
1986	387	+5.2%
1991	380	−1.8%
1996	350	−7.9%
2001	201	−42.6%
2006	309	+53.7%
2011	326	+5.5%
2016	314	−3.7%
2021	305	−2.9%

In the 2021 Census of Population conducted by Statistics Canada, Anchor Point had a population of 305 living in 122 of its 131 total private dwellings, a change of −2.9% from its 2016 population of 314. With a land area of 2.26 km^{2} (0.87 sq mi), it had a population density of 135.0/km^{2} (349.5/sq mi) in 2021.

== See also ==
- List of cities and towns in Newfoundland and Labrador
