= Brador =

Brador may refer to:

- Brador or Brador Bay, a community within Blanc-Sablon, Quebec, Canada
- Brador River, in Quebec, Canada, flowing into the Bay of Brador at Blanc-Sablon
- Molson Brador, a brand of Molson Coors beer
