= Vieux-Fort (disambiguation) =

Vieux-Fort may refer to:

- Vieux Fort Quarter in Saint Lucia
- Vieux Fort, Saint Lucia, a town within the above
- Vieux-Fort, Guadeloupe
- Vieux-Fort, Quebec, a small community in Canada
