= Bonne-Espérance, Quebec =

Bonne-Espérance
- Municipality
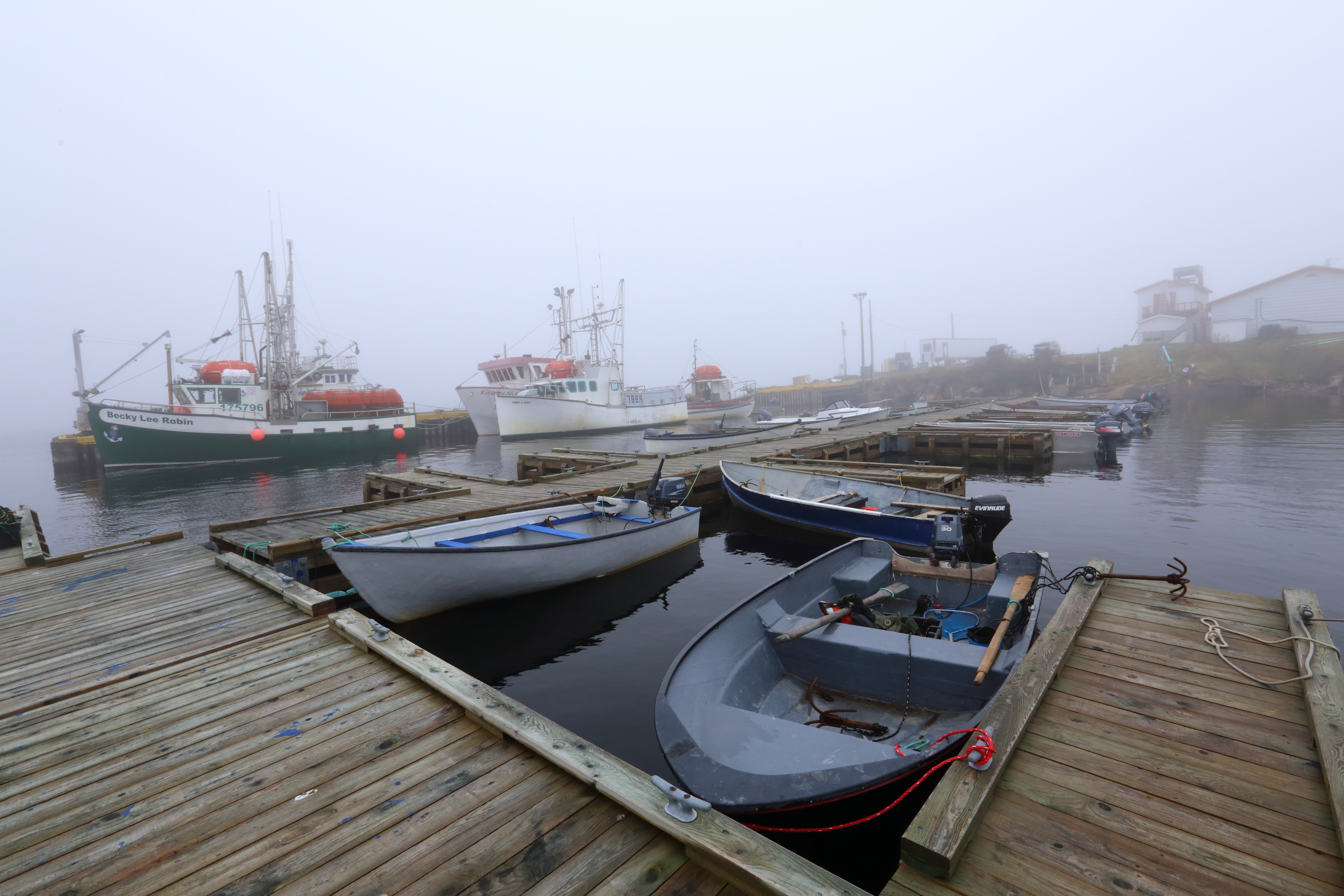
- Fishing harbour of Old Fort

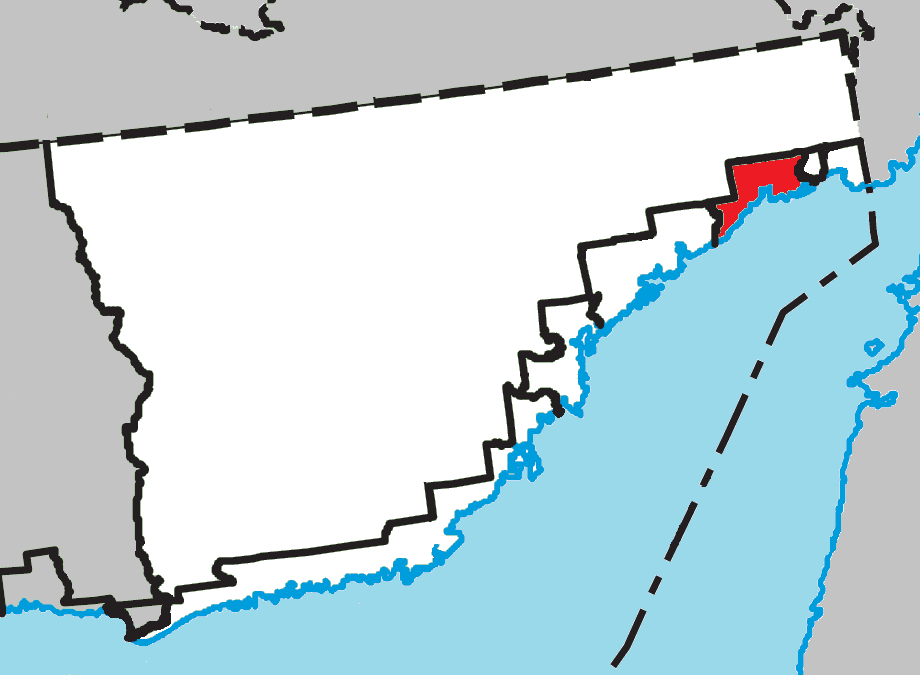
- Location within Le Golfe-du-Saint-Laurent RCM

- Location in Côte-Nord Region of Quebec
- Coordinates: 51°23′N 57°40′W
- Country: Canada
- Province: Quebec
- Region: Côte-Nord
- RCM: Le Golfe-du-Saint-Laurent
- Constituted: January 1, 1990

Government
  - Mayor: Dale Roberts-Keats
  - Federal riding: Côte-Nord—Kawawachikamach—Nitassinan
  - Prov. riding: Duplessis

Area
  - Total: 1,215.65 km^{2} (469.37 sq mi)
  - Land: 622.99 km^{2} (240.54 sq mi)

Population (2021)
  - Total: 692
  - Density: 1.1/km^{2} (2.8/sq mi)
  - Pop (2016-21): ▲1.6%
  - Dwellings: 318
- Time zone: UTC-4 (AST)
- Postal code(s): G0G 2P0
- Area codes: 418 and 581
- Highways: R-138
- Climate: Dfc
- Website: www.bonneesperance.ca

Bonne-Espérance (French pronunciation: [bɔnɛspeʁɑ̃s]) is a municipality in the Côte-Nord region of the province of Quebec in Canada.

The municipality is made up of the fishing villages of St. Paul's River (Rivière-Saint-Paul), Middle Bay (Baie du Milieu), and Old Fort (Old Fort Bay), and was incorporated as a municipality on January 1, 1990. All three communities are accessible via Quebec Route 138 from Blanc-Sablon to the east only; this road currently ends at Vieux-Fort before commencing again at Kegashka some 300 kilometres (190 mi) west-south-west.

== History ==
The area was first incorporated in 1963 as part of the Municipality of Côte-Nord-du-Golfe-du-Saint-Laurent, but separated on January 1, 1990, and became the Municipality of Bonne-Espérance.

=== Early history ===
Bonne Esperance was first known to be inhabited by the Maritime Archaic people. The Maritime Archaic people are probably the ancestors of today's Innu people, and lived on the coast about 9,000 years ago. When the French met the Innu they called them Montagnais, because of the hilly land they lived on, however since 1990 the preferred name is Innu.

=== French colonial history ===
In 1534, Jacques Cartier established a short-term storehouse around the modern-day location of Old Fort to help resupply his ship crews. The words "Old Establishment" found on the map of Nicolas Bellin in 1744, would indicate that "Vieux-Fort" is the former site of "Brest", visited especially by Basque and Breton fishermen at the turn of the sixteenth century to hunt whale and render their blubber for lamp oil. But Brest was later relocated to Brador Bay, where in 1907 a township was created with the same name. In 1702 Augustin Le Gardeur de Courtemanche was granted a large concession by the King of France from the Kegaska River (Kegashka) to the Kessessakiou (Hamilton River). In 1702, Courtemanche built a fort on Old Fort Bay to protect the fishermen and trappers he employed to harvest the region's abundance in cod, whale, seal and furs from the hostile Inuit. This fort was replaced by Fort Pontchartrain, that Courtemanche built on Brador Bay in 1704. However, in 1714, 800 Inuit attacked the fort and stole everything they could. Courtemanche, planning to strike back at the Inuit to pacify them, died in 1717. His son François Martel De Brouague took over the Labrador fishery and managed it profitably through two naval wars between France and England, until his death in 1761.

=== British colonial history ===
It was not until the 19th century that permanent residents from Newfoundland and elsewhere in Quebec began to establish the three fishing communities, whose current day inhabitants are largely descended from these people.

== Communities ==
In addition to the three villages mentioned below, the municipality also includes the ghost town of Salmon Bay (51°25′27″N 57°36′55″W).

=== Middle Bay ===
Middle Bay (51°27′54″N 57°29′46″W) is a small fishing village with a population of thirty-three permanent residents (2016), but in the summer seasons more people go there to fish.

=== St. Paul's River ===
The town of St. Paul's River (officially in French: Rivière-Saint-Paul; 51°28′14″N 57°42′45″W) is between the communities of Old Fort Bay and Middle Bay. The population of this village is 100 (2016).

=== Old Fort ===
As the name suggests, Old Fort (officially in French: Vieux-Fort; 51°25′25″N 57°49′28″W) has a long history but in 2016 was a town of 234 people.

== Demographics ==
=== Population ===
Canada census – Bonne-Espérance community profile

	2021	2016	2011
Population	692 (+1.6% from 2016)	681 (-7.0% from 2011)	732 (-12.2% from 2006)
Land area	622.99 km^{2} (240.54 sq mi)	646.73 km^{2} (249.70 sq mi)	646.73 km^{2} (249.70 sq mi)
Population density	1.1/km^{2} (2.8/sq mi)	1.1/km^{2} (2.8/sq mi)	1.1/km^{2} (2.8/sq mi)
Median age	53.2 (M: 52.8, F: 53.6)	50.9 (M: 51.0, F: 50.8)	46.6 (M: 46.4, F: 47.0)
Private dwellings	318 (total) 282 (occupied)	296 (total)	319 (total)
Median household income	$78,000	$67,584	$.N/A

References: 2021 2016 2011

Historical Census Data - Bonne-Espérance, Quebec

Year	Pop.	±%
1991	896	—
1996	906	+1.1%
2001	852	−6.0%
2006	834	−2.1%

Year	Pop.	±%
2011	732	−12.2%
2016	681	−7.0%
2021	692	+1.6%

Source: Statistics Canada

=== Language ===
Canada Census Mother Tongue - Bonne-Espérance, Quebec
Census	Total	French			English			French & English			Other		
Year	Responses	Count	Trend	Pop %	Count	Trend	Pop %	Count	Trend	Pop %	Count	Trend	Pop %
2011	730	10	▼33.3%	1.37%	715	▼10.1%	97.95%	0	0.0%	0.00%	5	▼83.3%	0.68%
2006	840	15	0.0%	1.79%	795	▼1.9%	94.64%	0	0.0%	0.00%	30	0.0%	3.57%
2001	855	15	▲33.3%	1.75%	810	▼9.0%	94.74%	0	0.0%	0.00%	30	▲ n/a%	3.51%
1996	900	10	n/a	1.11%	890	n/a	98.89%	0	n/a	0.00%	0	n/a	0.00%

== Economy ==
One of the main jobs for people in Bonne Espérance area is the fishery. There are three fish plants, one located in each of the villages: Middle Bay, St. Paul's River and Old Fort. The fish plants are open during the summer months. This facility employs around 100 people. There is also a school board which employs about 25 people, including teachers, janitors, secretaries and technicians. There is the municipality which employs about 10 people. There is the Coasters Association which employs about 11 people and there are local grocery stores/ businesses that employ a number of people. There is also USL; this is a construction company which operates in Ontario and Alberta. Every year, many of the men leave their community and go to work in both places usually leaving in the spring and returning in the fall. During the winter months, most people who fish, work in the fish plants, and go to work in Alberta and Ontario collect employment insurance benefits.

== Local government ==
List of former mayors:

- Lionel Roberts (...–2009, 2013–2017)
- Bryce Douglas Fequet (2009–2013)
- Roderick Fequet (2017–2021)
- Dale Roberts-Keats (2021–present)

== Education ==
St. Paul's River is the only village on the Lower North Shore that has a high school that is not combined with an elementary school. The school was once an elementary and secondary school, but in 2004, it became St. Paul's High School. As well, Commission scolaire du Littoral operates Mountain Ridge School (anglophone) in Old Fort.

== See also ==
- List of anglophone communities in Quebec
- List of municipalities in Quebec
