= Blanc-Sablon Bay =

Natural bay in Quebec, Canada

Coordinates: 51°25′21.5″N 57°3′41.3″W

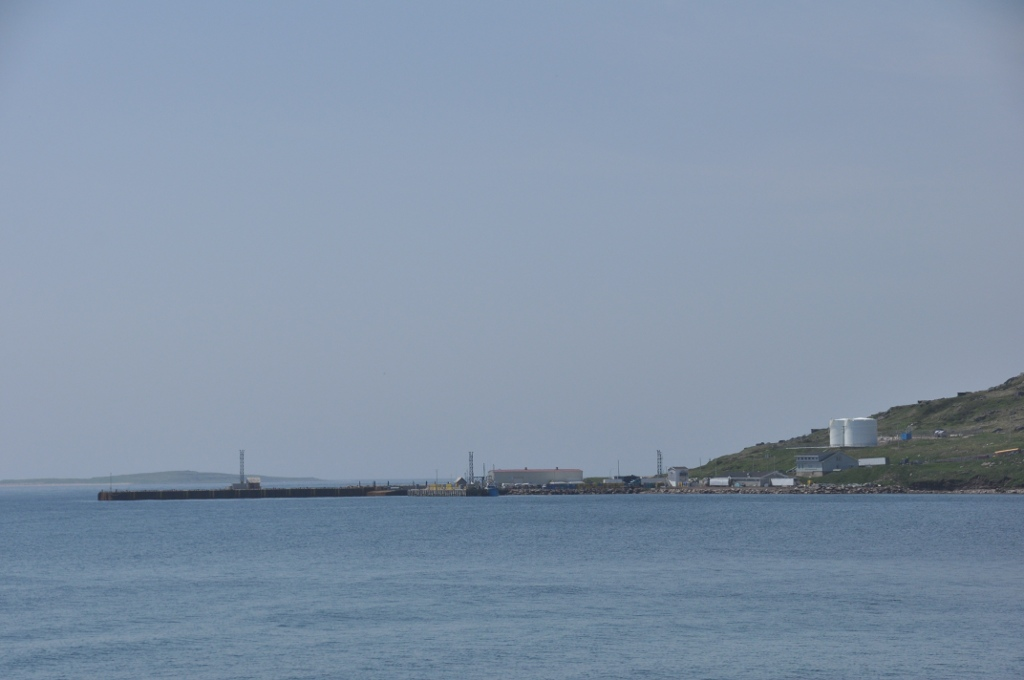
Blanc-Sablon ferry Terminal, Blanc-Sablon Bay, Strait of Belle Isle.

Blanc-Sablon Bay (French: Baie de Blanc-Sablon, pronounced [bɛ də blɑ̃ sablɔ̃], lit. 'White-Sand Bay') is a natural bay in municipality of Blanc-Sablon, in Le Golfe-du-Saint-Laurent Regional County Municipality, on the Côte-Nord (North-Shore) coast of Strait of Belle Isle, in Quebec, Canada.

== Geography ==
The "Bay of Blanc-Sablon" is the most easterly bay of the Quebec. The village of Blanc-Sablon is located on the bay. Blanc-Sablon Bay is bounded between Point Morel (west side) and the Pointe St. Charles (East side). The bay is located opposite the Bois Island, which serves to protect the bay from heavy seas. Blanc-Sablon Bay includes Morel and Cove Harbour Job's Room. The bottom of the bay is located just 1.6 km from the border Quebec - Labrador; this boundary pass at the eastern limit of the bay.

The long dock of the bay hosts ferries, including one linking Saint-Augustin, Côte-Nord, Quebec, on the Côte-Nord (North-Shore) of Quebec and the other one linking St. Barbe, Newfoundland and Labrador.

== See also ==
=== Related articles ===
- Blanc-Sablon, Quebec
- Côte-Nord (North-Shore), administrative region
- Gulf of Saint Lawrence
- Strait of Belle Isle
- Brador River
- Lourdes-de-Blanc-Sablon Airport
