= St. Barbe Bay =

Natural bay in Newfoundland and Labrador, Canada

Coordinates: 51.216°N 56.781°W

A view of the bay

St. Barbe Bay is a natural bay off the island of Newfoundland in the province of Newfoundland and Labrador, Canada.

== See also ==
=== Related articles ===
- St. Barbe (hamlet)
- Blanc-Sablon, Quebec
- Strait of Belle Isle
- Newfoundland and Labrador, province
- Newfoundland Island
