= Lourdes-de-Blanc-Sablon =

- Unconstituted locality
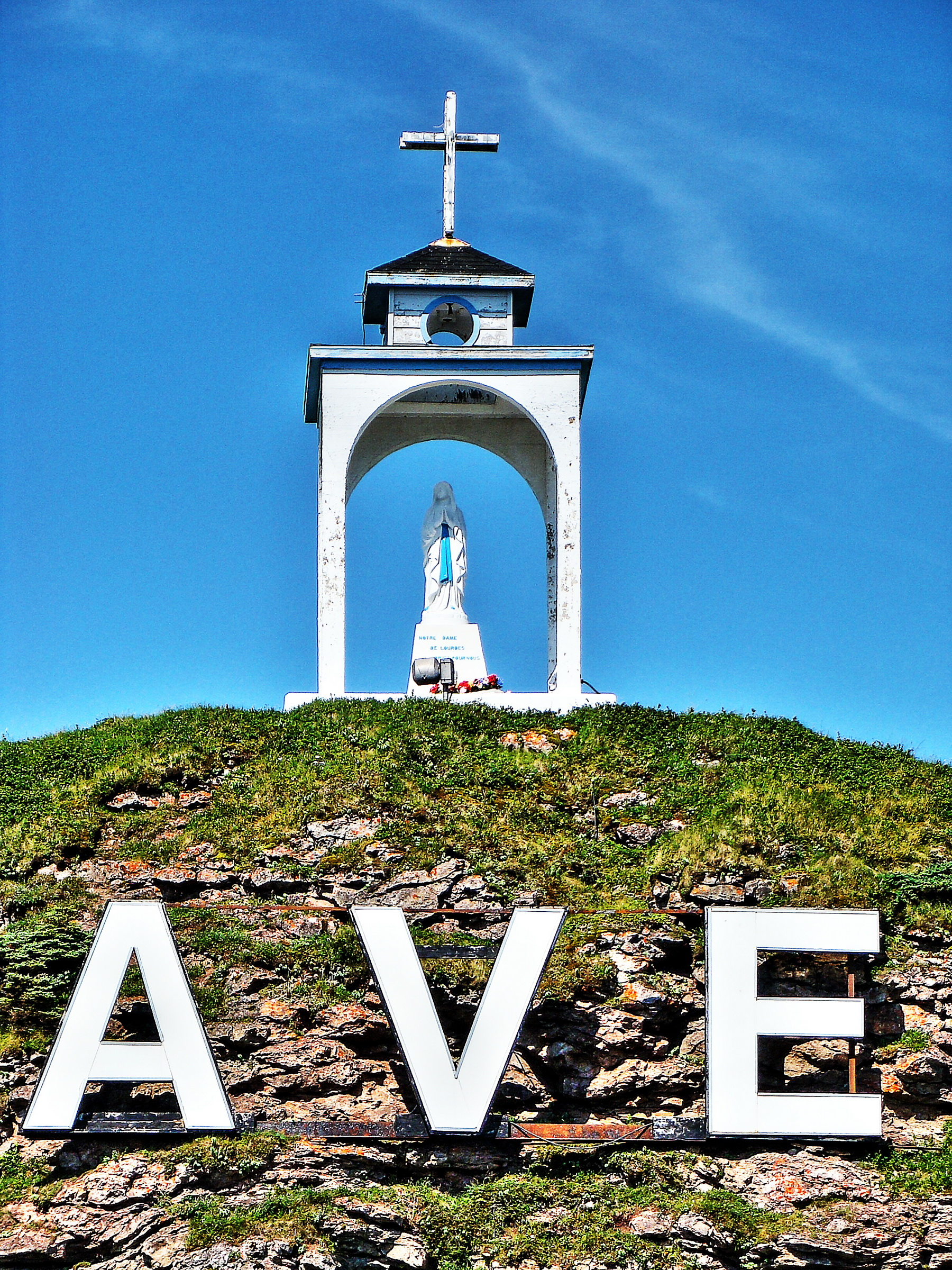
- Notre-Dame de Lourdes-de-Blanc-Sablon protects the community

- Location within Quebec
- Coordinates: 51°24′41″N 57°12′11″W
- Country: Canada
- Province: Quebec
- Region: Côte-Nord
- RCM: Le Golfe-du-Saint-Laurent
- Municipality: Blanc-Sablon

Government
  - Federal riding: Côte-Nord—Kawawachikamach—Nitassinan
  - Prov. riding: Duplessis

Area
  - Land: 9.63 km^{2} (3.72 sq mi)

Population (2011)
  - Total: 828
  - Density: 86/km^{2} (220/sq mi)
  - Change (2006–11): ▼9.0%
  - Dwellings: 374
- Time zone: UTC-04:00 (AST)
- Postal code(s): G0G 1W0
- Area codes: 418 and 581

Lourdes-de-Blanc-Sablon (French pronunciation: [luʁd də blɑ̃ sablɔ̃]) is an unconstituted locality within the municipality of Blanc-Sablon in the Côte-Nord region of Quebec, Canada.

Jacques Cartier landed at the place in 1534 and set up a cross near the current site of Lourdes-de-Blanc-Sablon. The name was known before the Jacques Cartier's explorations. In his accounts of the 1534 voyage, he cites three times Blanc-Sablon, without any explanation. Sablon is an old French term meaning Fine Sand.

In 1858, the Mission of Longue-Pointe-de-Blanc-Sablon was established and took the name Lourdes-de-Blanc-Sablon or Notre-Dame-de-Lourdes at the end of 19th century.

Lourdes-de-Blanc-Sablon (51°24′41″N 57°12′11″W) is the largest of three communities forming the municipality of Blanc-Sablon (Blanc-Sablon, Lourdes-de-Blanc-Sablon, and Brador Bay), and is located on the headland that separates Brador Bay from Blanc-Sablon Bay. It was originally known as Longue-Pointe (Long Point) until the beginning of the 20th century. It has a small natural harbour, and long depended on the fishing business. Its population in the 2011 census was 828.

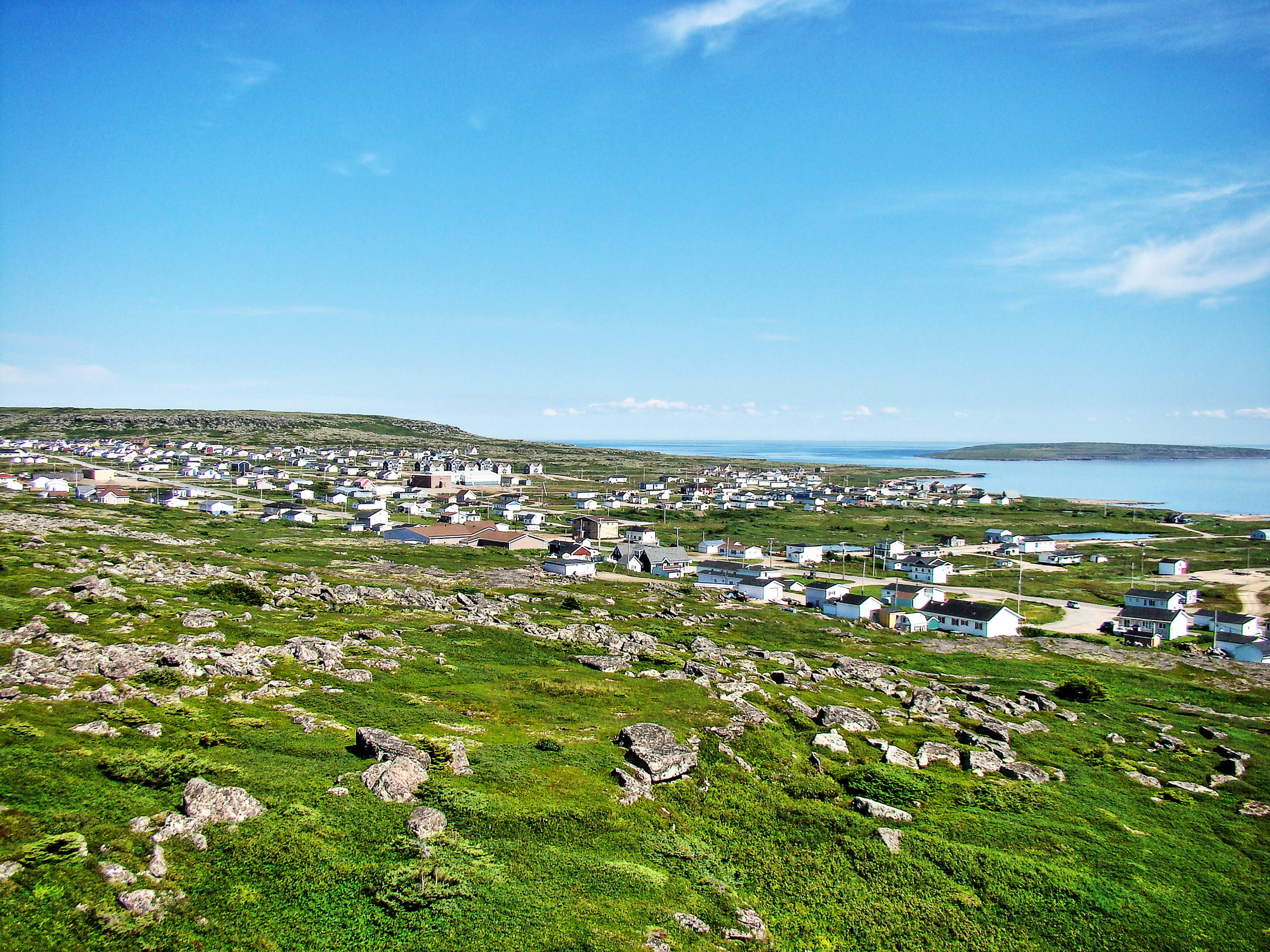
An overview of the unconstituted community of Lourdes-de-Blanc-Sablon

== Demographics ==
In the 2021 Census of Population conducted by Statistics Canada, Lourdes-de-Blanc-Sablon had a population of 827 living in 324 of its 357 total private dwellings, a change of −2.6% from its 2016 population of 849. With a land area of 9.25 km^{2} (3.57 sq mi), it had a population density of 89.4/km^{2} (231.6/sq mi) in 2021.

== Education ==
Commission scolaire du Littoral operates the Anglophone and Francophone school Mgr-Scheffer School in Lourdes-de-Blanc-Sablon.

== Climate ==
Lourdes-de-Blanc-Sablon has a subarctic climate (Köppen Dfc) that is influenced by the surrounding sea, moderating summer temperatures, and also ensuring winters are less severe than inland, although this region of Quebec is severely cold annually by global standards for the latitude.

Climate data for Blanc-Sablon (Lourdes-de-Blanc-Sablon Airport) WMO ID: 71808; coordinates 51°27′N 57°11′W; elevation: 37.2 m (122 ft); 1991–2020 normals, extremes 1982–present
| Month | Jan | Feb | Mar | Apr | May | Jun | Jul | Aug | Sep | Oct | Nov | Dec | Year |
|---|---|---|---|---|---|---|---|---|---|---|---|---|---|
| Record high humidex | 9.6 | 12.6 | 7.3 | 18.6 | 24.4 | 28.0 | 31.4 | 30.6 | 28.7 | 20.8 | 18.0 | 10.4 | 30.6 |
| Record high °C (°F) | 9.1 (48.4) | 8.3 (46.9) | 8.2 (46.8) | 18.6 (65.5) | 25.0 (77.0) | 27.1 (80.8) | 27.1 (80.8) | 28.1 (82.6) | 24.7 (76.5) | 21.0 (69.8) | 16.2 (61.2) | 11.0 (51.8) | 28.1 (82.6) |
| Mean daily maximum °C (°F) | −7.1 (19.2) | −7.0 (19.4) | −2.8 (27.0) | 2.0 (35.6) | 7.8 (46.0) | 12.5 (54.5) | 15.9 (60.6) | 17.1 (62.8) | 13.3 (55.9) | 7.7 (45.9) | 2.3 (36.1) | −3.1 (26.4) | 4.9 (40.8) |
| Daily mean °C (°F) | −11.8 (10.8) | −11.5 (11.3) | −6.9 (19.6) | −1.4 (29.5) | 3.8 (38.8) | 8.4 (47.1) | 12.1 (53.8) | 13.4 (56.1) | 9.4 (48.9) | 4.4 (39.9) | −1.1 (30.0) | −7.0 (19.4) | 1.0 (33.8) |
| Mean daily minimum °C (°F) | −16.4 (2.5) | −16.0 (3.2) | −11.0 (12.2) | −4.8 (23.4) | −0.3 (31.5) | 4.2 (39.6) | 8.3 (46.9) | 9.6 (49.3) | 5.4 (41.7) | 1.0 (33.8) | −4.5 (23.9) | −11.0 (12.2) | −3.0 (26.6) |
| Record low °C (°F) | −32.3 (−26.1) | −34.1 (−29.4) | −32.5 (−26.5) | −23.0 (−9.4) | −11.1 (12.0) | −3.6 (25.5) | 0.0 (32.0) | 0.9 (33.6) | −4.8 (23.4) | −10.4 (13.3) | −18.9 (−2.0) | −30.2 (−22.4) | −34.1 (−29.4) |
| Record low wind chill | −48.5 | −48.2 | −47.6 | −34.4 | −16.2 | −7.3 | 0.0 | 0.0 | −8.6 | −22.4 | −31.4 | −47.4 | −48.5 |
| Average precipitation mm (inches) | 76.5 (3.01) | 81.2 (3.20) | 91.2 (3.59) | 53.2 (2.09) | 66.9 (2.63) | 78.3 (3.08) | 93.9 (3.70) | 91.2 (3.59) | 101.7 (4.00) | 85.0 (3.35) | 83.8 (3.30) | 98.4 (3.87) | 1,001.1 (39.41) |
| Average rainfall mm (inches) | 12.3 (0.48) | 6.9 (0.27) | 11.9 (0.47) | 21.2 (0.83) | 63.5 (2.50) | 79.4 (3.13) | 92.8 (3.65) | 86.6 (3.41) | 102.1 (4.02) | 77.1 (3.04) | 58.9 (2.32) | 31.7 (1.25) | 644.2 (25.36) |
| Average snowfall cm (inches) | 66.2 (26.1) | 70.0 (27.6) | 73.9 (29.1) | 32.4 (12.8) | 6.8 (2.7) | 0.1 (0.0) | 0.0 (0.0) | 0.0 (0.0) | 0.0 (0.0) | 3.9 (1.5) | 24.2 (9.5) | 68.3 (26.9) | 345.9 (136.2) |
| Average precipitation days (≥ 0.2 mm) | 16.6 | 16.4 | 17.5 | 14.2 | 14.3 | 14.7 | 16.7 | 15.0 | 14.6 | 15.4 | 15.6 | 17.1 | 188.1 |
| Average rainy days (≥ 0.2 mm) | 3.2 | 2.2 | 4.2 | 7.5 | 12.6 | 14.5 | 16.6 | 14.2 | 14.2 | 14.5 | 10.1 | 5.5 | 119.2 |
| Average snowy days (≥ 0.2 cm) | 15.3 | 15.4 | 14.9 | 8.4 | 2.7 | 0.15 | 0.0 | 0.0 | 0.0 | 1.8 | 8.0 | 14.7 | 81.3 |
| Average relative humidity (%) (at 1500 LST) | 73.3 | 72.4 | 75.7 | 76.6 | 72.7 | 75.8 | 81.2 | 79.6 | 76.8 | 76.6 | 76.8 | 76.2 | 76.1 |
| Mean monthly sunshine hours | 93.9 | 106.7 | 111.7 | 137.6 | 157.5 | 165.3 | 141.9 | 159.0 | 128.9 | 106.2 | 85.1 | 75.8 | 1,469.4 |
| Percentage possible sunshine | 36.0 | 37.9 | 30.4 | 33.1 | 32.6 | 33.3 | 28.4 | 35.2 | 33.9 | 32.0 | 31.8 | 30.8 | 32.9 |
Source: Environment and Climate Change Canada (sunshine 1981–2010)
