= Qajaq W =

Canadian ferry

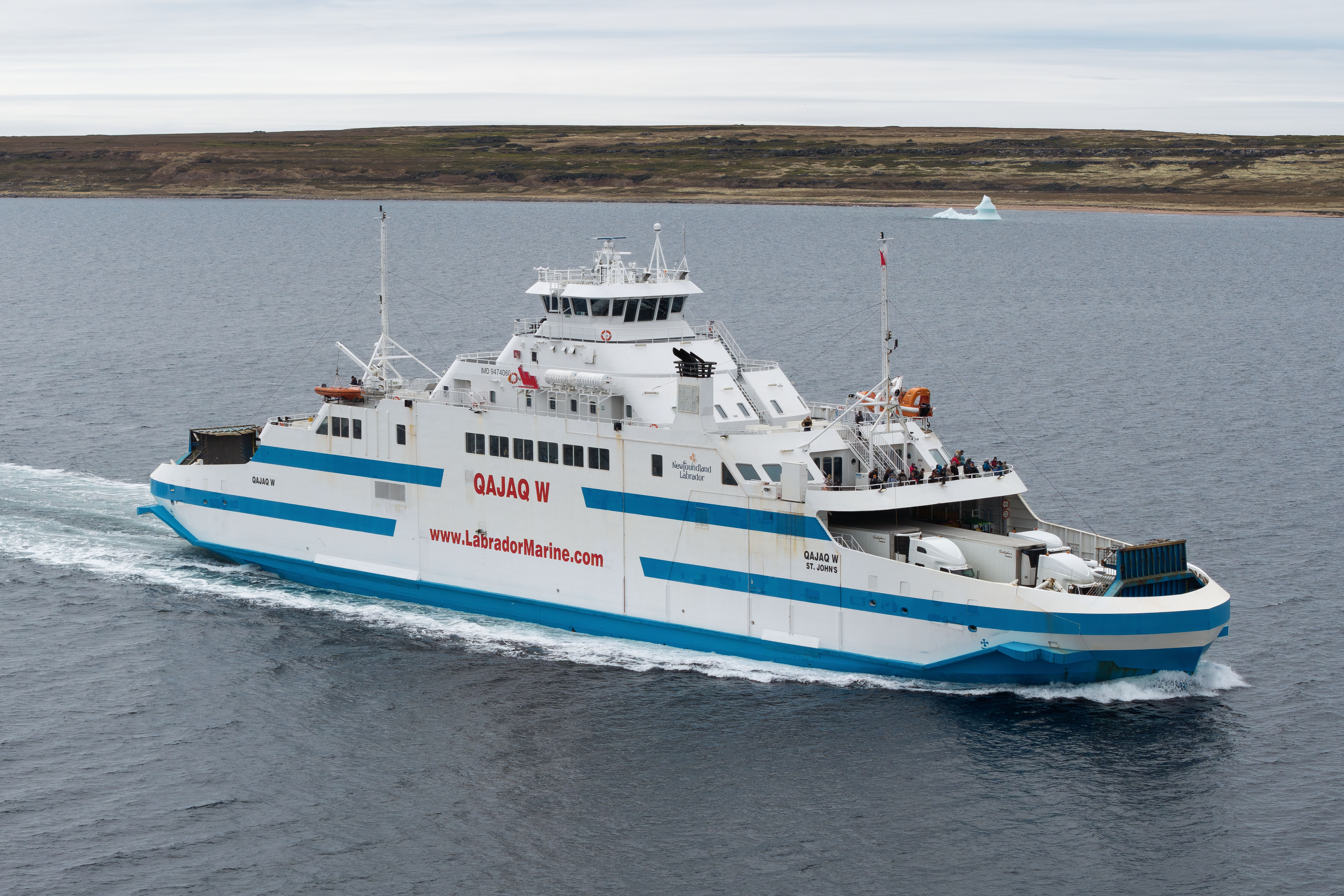
- Qajaq W entering Blanc-Sablon harbour

History
- Name: 2010–2017: Muhumaa; 2017–2018: Grete; 2018–present: Qajaq W
- Owner: Labrador Marine Services Inc.
- Operator: Labrador Marine
- Port of registry: St. John's, Canada
- Route: St. Barbe–Blanc-Sablon
- Builder: Fiskerstrand Verft, Norway
- Yard number: 63
- Completed: 2010
- Identification: IMO number: 9474060
- Status: In service

General characteristics
- Class & type: MM90FC
- Type: Roll-on/roll-off passenger ferry
- Tonnage: 5,233 GT
- Length: 97.84 m (321.0 ft)
- Beam: 18.00 m (59.06 ft)
- Draught: 4.2 m (14 ft)
- Ice class: ICE-1A
- Installed power: 2 × Wärtsilä 6L20 and 2 × Wärtsilä 8L20 diesel generator sets
- Propulsion: Diesel-electric; two azimuth thrusters
- Speed: 15 kn (28 km/h; 17 mph)
- Capacity: 300 passengers; 120 vehicles; 8 tractor-trailers

Qajaq W is a Canadian roll-on/roll-off passenger and vehicle ferry operated by Labrador Marine on the Strait of Belle Isle route between St. Barbe, Newfoundland and Labrador, and Blanc-Sablon, Quebec. Built in 2010 as Muhumaa for Saaremaa Shipping Company, she later operated in Germany as Grete before being acquired for service in Canada.

== Construction ==
The vessel was built to the MM90FC-class design by Multi Maritime, and the hull was built and partly outfitted by Fiskerstrand BLRT in Klaipėda, Lithuania. The ship was delivered to Saaremaa Shipping Company in March 2010 as the first of three sister ferries ordered under the same programme.

As built, the MM90FC design measured about 97.9 m (321 ft) in overall length, with a moulded beam of 18.0 m (59.1 ft), gross tonnage of 5,233, and DNV ICE-1A classification. Propulsion is diesel-electric, using four Wärtsilä diesel generator sets and two azimuthing propulsion units.

== Service history ==
The ship entered service as Muhumaa, serving ferry routes between mainland Estonia and the western Estonian islands. She was later renamed Grete and used on the Elbe ferry route between Cuxhaven and Brunsbüttel in Germany.

In 2018, Labrador Marine acquired the vessel for ferry service in Newfoundland and Labrador. In January 2019, the Government of Newfoundland and Labrador announced that the renamed Qajaq W would enter service on the Strait of Belle Isle crossing earlier than expected, replacing the 49-year-old Apollo. Before the vessel entered service, Aker Arctic assessed the hull and propulsion systems for operation in the Strait of Belle Isle. The vessel was retrofitted to carry up to 300 passengers, 120 passenger vehicles, and 8 tractor-trailers.

Qajaq W mainly operates between St. Barbe and Blanc-Sablon, a 36 km (22 mi) crossing with a scheduled duration of around 1 hour and 45 minutes. Ice conditions in the Strait of Belle Isle can increase the crossing time or disrupt sailings. In February 2020, the provincial government said that heavy ice and an ice ridge were creating unsafe conditions for both Qajaq W and Canadian Coast Guard icebreakers assisting the service.

== See also ==
- MV Apollo
- Transport in Newfoundland and Labrador
- Strait of Belle Isle
