= Brador River =

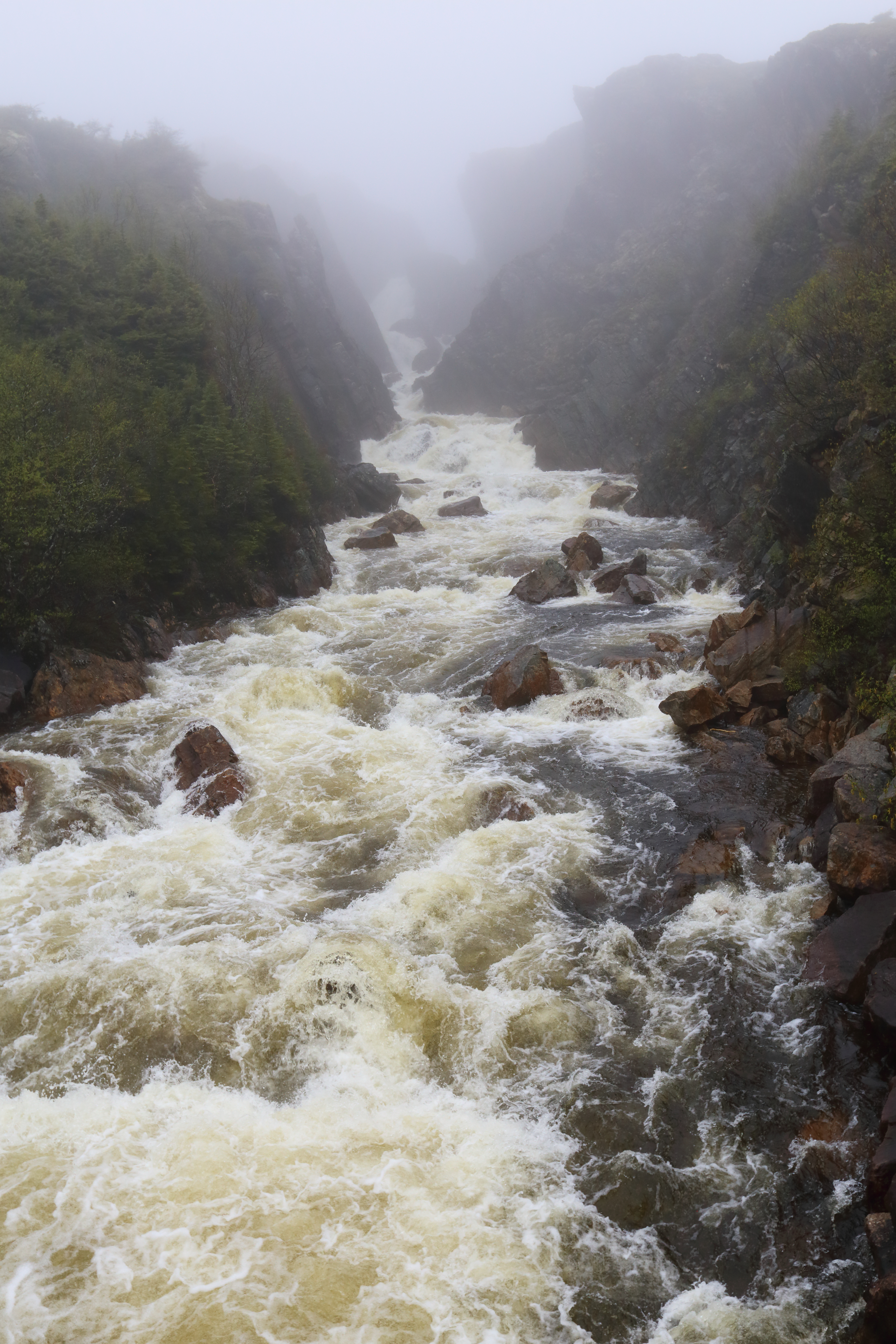
- Brador falls

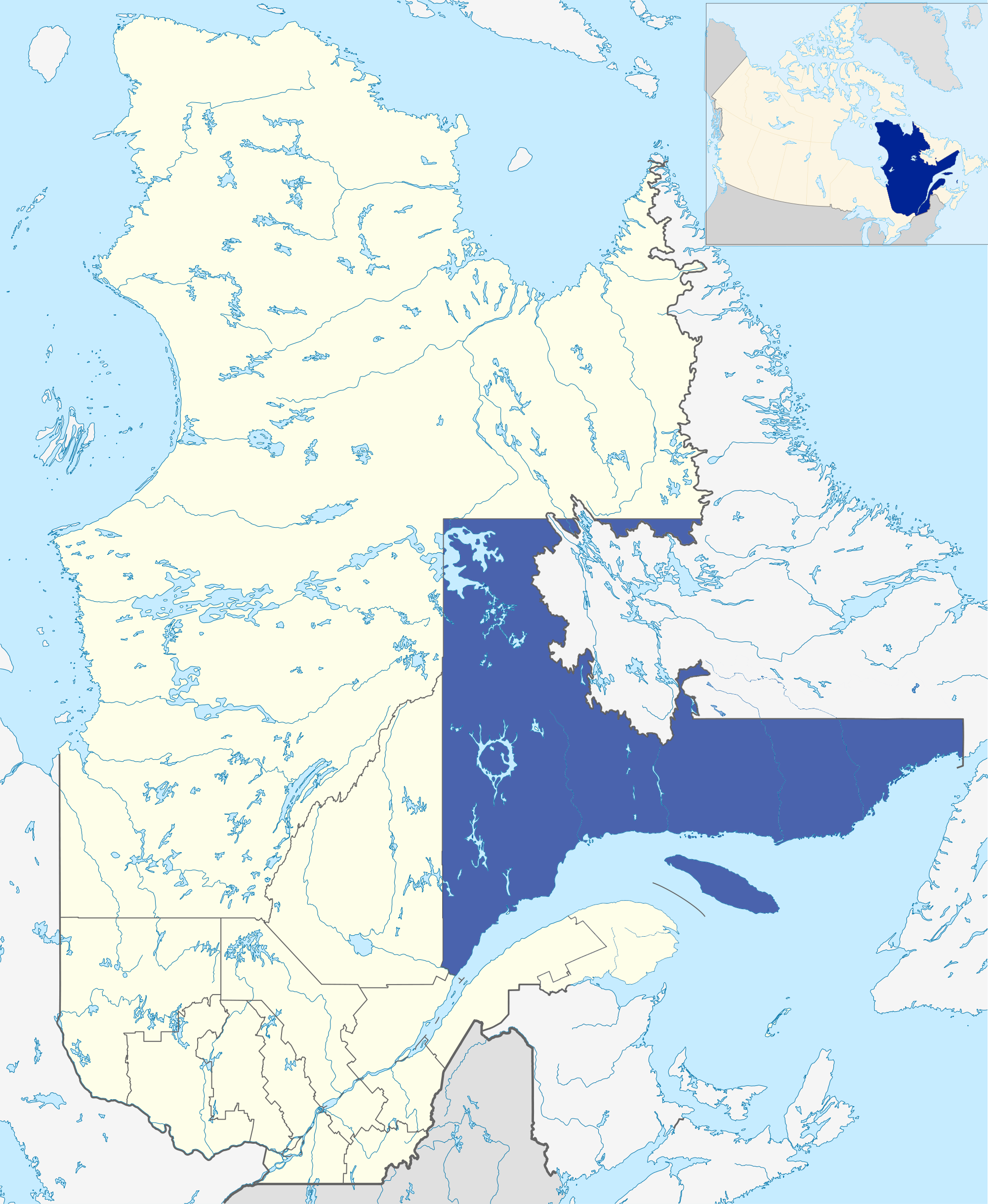
- Administrative region of Côte-Nord in Quebec

Location
- Country: Canada
- Province: Quebec
- Region: Côte-Nord

Physical characteristics
- Source: Lac Bradore Cabin
  - location: Quebec, Canada
- Mouth: Gulf of Saint Lawrence
  - location: Blanc-Sablon, Quebec, Côte-Nord, Quebec, Canada
  - coordinates: 51°30′15″N 57°14′48″W
  - elevation: 0 m (0 ft)
- Length: 32 km (20 mi)
- Basin size: 207 km^{2} (80 sq mi)
- Discharge
  - location: Strait of Belle Isle

The River Brador (formerly named "River Bay Bradore") flows into the city of Blanc-Sablon in the regional county municipality (MRC) Le Golfe-du-Saint-Laurent Regional County Municipality, in the administrative region of North Shore, in Quebec, Canada.

== Geography ==
The Brador river rises from the "Lac Bradore Cabin", 13 kilometres (8 mi) west of the border of Quebec – Labrador. This lake supplies including water in upstream lakes: Philip Bridge and Shirt Tail. While the lake outlets Stove Pipe Gulch and L. Bezeau empties into the river Brador.

The river flows south in the far east of the Quebec; its course is parallel to the boundary of Labrador. After crossing the route 138, it flows into the Bay of Brador, located northeast of the town of Blanc-Sablon, Quebec, connected to Strait of Belle Isle. The mouth of the river is 3.2 kilometres (2.0 mi) north of the hamlet "Brador" and 13 kilometres (8 mi) west of the border Quebec – Labrador.

== Toponymy ==
Nestled on the eastern shore of the bay of the same name, the hamlet Brador is 8 kilometres (5 mi) west of the border Quebec – Labrador. This hamlet was named in the eighteenth century under the names of "Fort Pontchartrain" and "Bay Phélipeaux". This hamlet is built into the municipality of Blanc-Sablon.

The term "Brador" is a truncated derivative of the word "Labrador". The syllable "la" of this name was amputated and is considered an article. This truncated spelling of his first element figured early in the documents of the New France. In his travel notes, Samuel de Champlain sometimes wrote "la Brador" sometimes "Labrador". In 1704, Fort Pontchartrain to be erected at Brador, under the direction of Augustin Le Gardeur de Courtemanche.

Formerly, Blanc-Sablon and its surroundings had served as a maritime and military vocation. In the municipality of Blanc-Sablon, several names use the term "Brador": village, town, bay, river, lake, bay, "Hills Brador", the "Bird Sanctuary of Brador Bay" and "biodiversity reserve Hills Brador". The name "Brador River" was made official on Dec. 5, 1968, at the Bank of place names in the Geographical Names Board of Québec

== See also ==
=== Related articles ===
- North Shore
- Le Golfe-du-Saint-Laurent Regional County Municipality, regional county municipality (MRC)
- Blanc-Sablon, Municipality of the North Shore.
- Gulf of St. Lawrence
- Strait of Belle Isle
- Lourdes-de-Blanc-Sablon Airport
- Border between Quebec and Newfoundland and Labrador
- List of rivers of Quebec

=== References ===
- Tourism Bradore
