= Old Fort, Quebec =

Old Fort
- Unconstituted locality
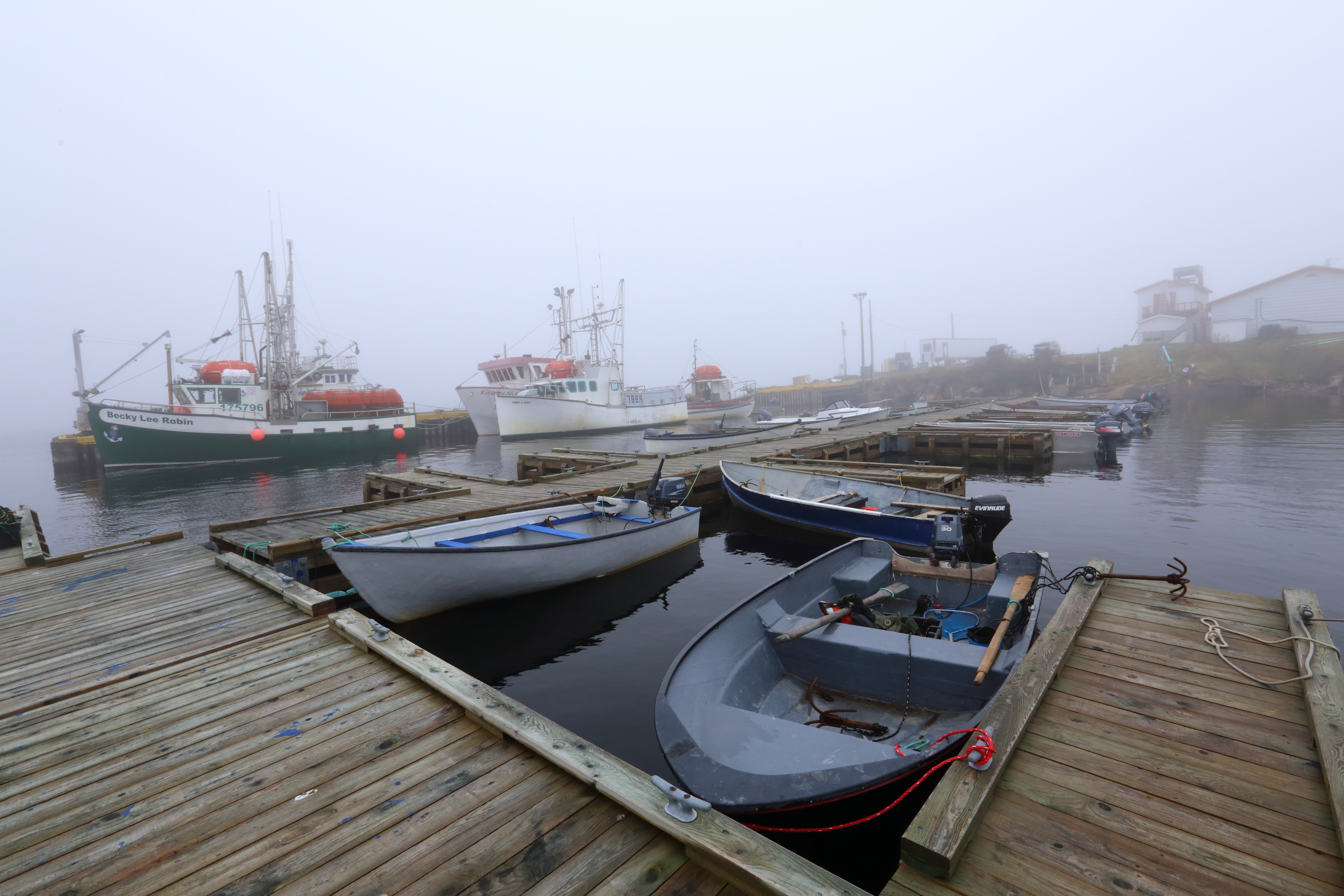
- Fishing Harbour of Old Fort

- Location within Quebec
- Coordinates: 51°25′25″N 57°49′28″W
- Country: Canada
- Province: Quebec
- Region: Côte-Nord
- RCM: Le Golfe-du-Saint-Laurent
- Municipality: Bonne-Espérance

Government
  - Federal riding: Côte-Nord—Kawawachikamach—Nitassinan
  - Prov. riding: Duplessis

Area
  - Land: 3.01 km^{2} (1.16 sq mi)

Population (2021)
  - Total: 256
  - Density: 92.7/km^{2} (240/sq mi)
  - Change (2006–11): ▼14.9%
  - Dwellings: 119
- Time zone: UTC-4 (AST)
- Postal code(s): G0G 2G0
- Area codes: 418 and 581
- Highways: R-138

Vieux Fort (also known as Old Fort) is an unconstituted locality within the municipality of Bonne-Espérance in the Côte-Nord region of Quebec, Canada. It is also known as Old Fort Bay or Vieux-Fort (the latter is preferred by the Commission de toponymie du Québec).

== Demographics ==
In the 2021 Census of Population conducted by Statistics Canada, Old Fort had a population of 256 living in 106 of its 113 total private dwellings, a change of 9.4% from its 2016 population of 234. With a land area of 3.43 km^{2} (1.32 sq mi), it had a population density of 74.6/km^{2} (193.3/sq mi) in 2021.

== Education ==
Commission scolaire du Littoral operates Mountain Ridge School (anglophone) in Old Fort.
