= Blanc-Sablon =

- Municipality
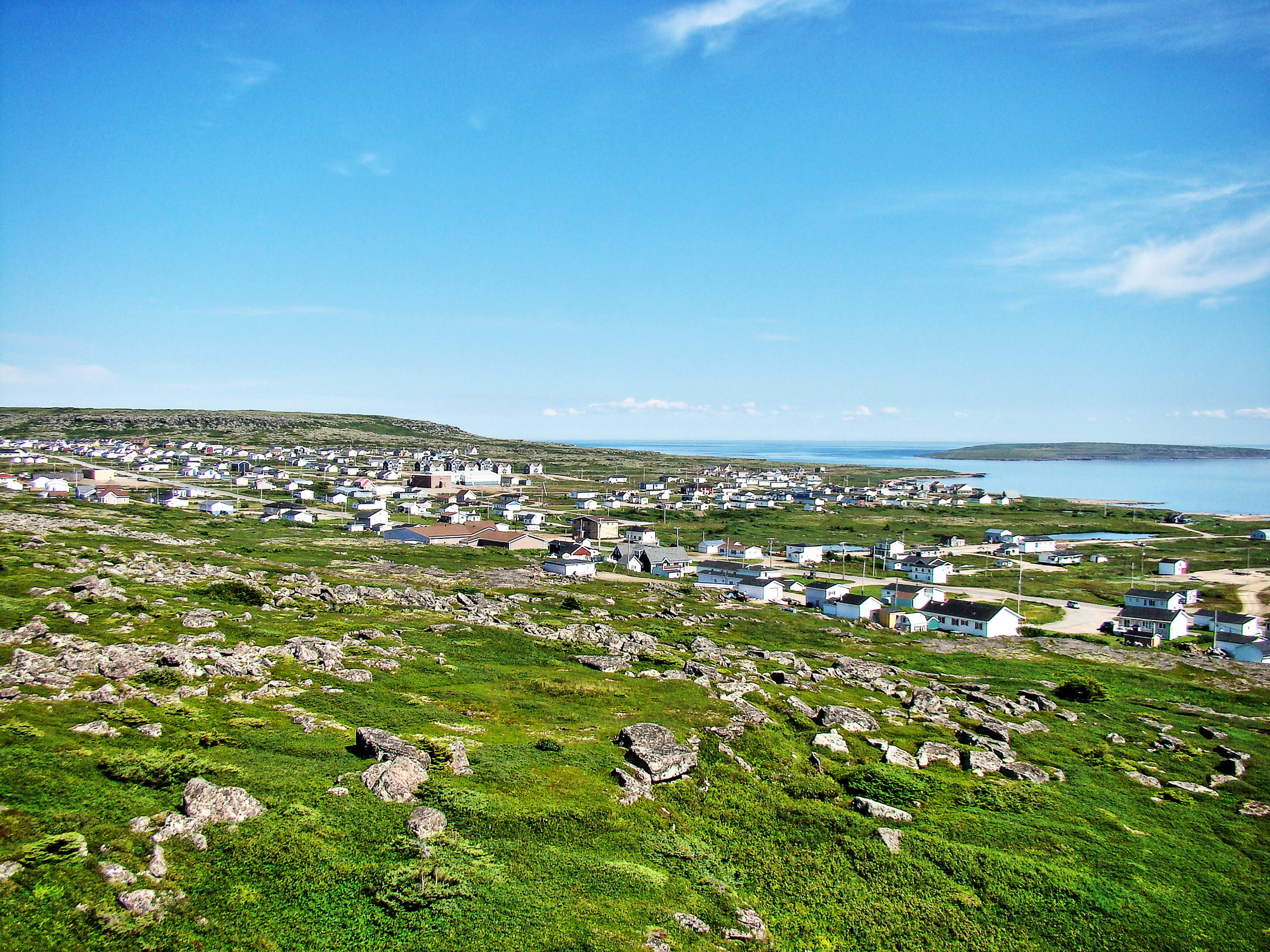
- Quebec Labrador Peninsula, Blanc-Sablon Bay, Lourdes-de-Blanc-Sablon

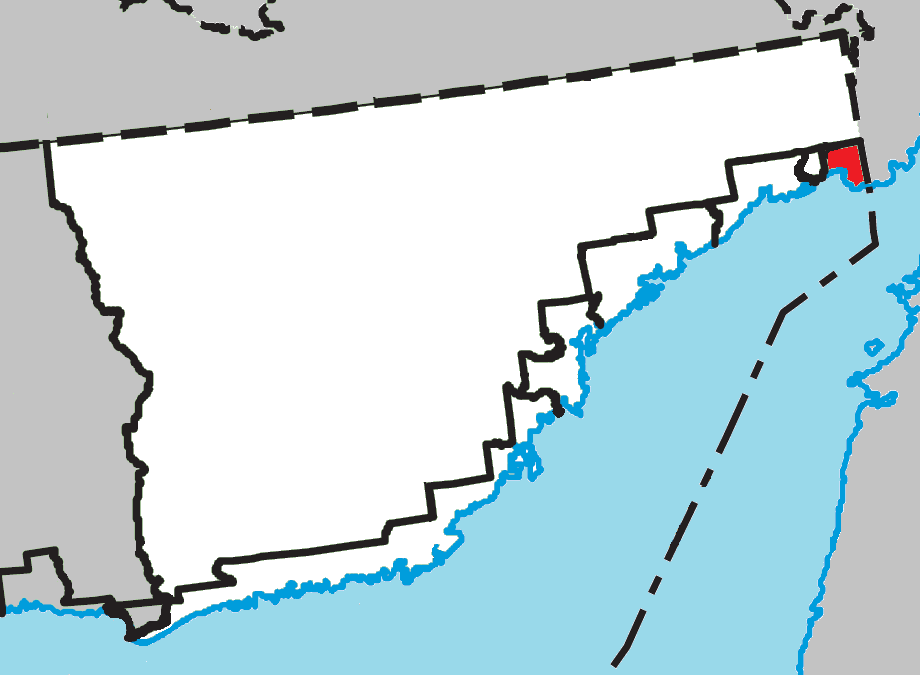
- Location within Le Golfe-du-Saint-Laurent RCM

- Location within Quebec
- Coordinates: 51°25′03″N 57°11′08″W
- Country: Canada
- Province: Quebec
- Region: Côte-Nord
- RCM: Le Golfe-du-Saint-Laurent
- Settled: 19th century
- Constituted: January 1, 1990

Government
  - Mayor: Colin Shattler
  - Federal riding: Côte-Nord—Kawawachikamach—Nitassinan
  - Provincial riding: Duplessis

Area
  - Total: 381.85 km^{2} (147.43 sq mi)
  - Land: 234.98 km^{2} (90.73 sq mi)
- Elevation: 2 m (6.6 ft)

Population (2021)
  - Total: 1,122
  - Density: 4.8/km^{2} (12/sq mi)
  - Pop (2016-21): ▲0.9%
  - Dwellings: 503
- Time zone: UTC-04:00 (AST)
- Postal code(s): G0G 1W0
- Area codes: 418 and 581
- Highways: R-138; Route 510 (Trans-Labrador Highway)
- GNBC Code: EOACK
- NTS Map: 012P06

Blanc-Sablon (French pronunciation: [blɑ̃ sablɔ̃]) is a municipality located on the shore of Blanc-Sablon Bay, in the Strait of Belle-Isle, Le Golfe-du-Saint-Laurent RCM, Côte-Nord, Quebec, Canada.

The municipality is made up of the merger of the villages Lourdes-de-Blanc-Sablon, Blanc-Sablon and Brador. With a population of 1,122 inhabitants in 2021, it is the most populous of Le Golfe-du-Saint-Laurent RCM.

== History ==
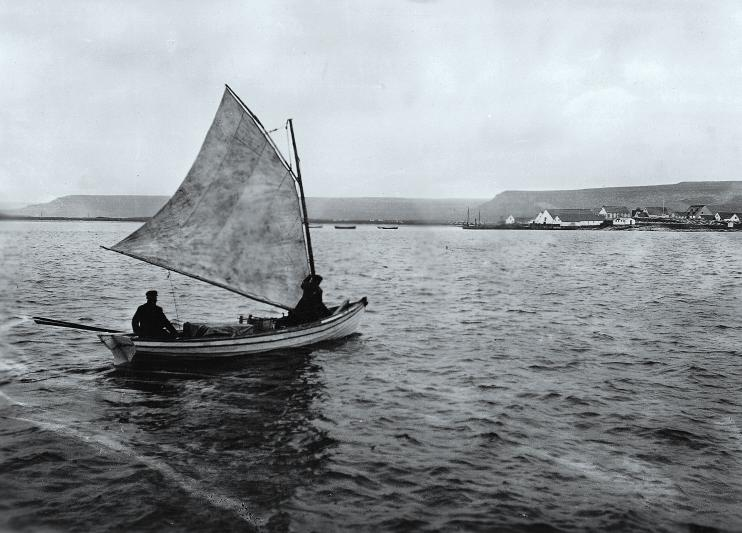
Blanc-Sablon 1908

The place was already known to early European explorers who may have named it after the fine white sand of the eponymous bay (blanc means "white", whereas sablon is the diminutive form of sable meaning "sand"). Or it may be named after Blancs-Sablons Cove in Saint-Malo, home town of Jacques Cartier, who landed at the site in 1534 and set up a cross near the current site of Lourdes-de-Blanc-Sablon.

During the 16th and 17th centuries, Basque and Portuguese fishermen seasonally frequented the area. In 1704, Augustin le Gardeur de Courtemanche, landlord of the lower Côte-Nord at that time, built Fort Pontchartrain at the current location of Brador. Permanent settlement did not begin until the 19th century with the arrival of French Canadians, Acadians, and Jersey settlers. In 1858, the Mission of Longue-Pointe-de-Blanc-Sablon was established and took the name Lourdes-de-Blanc-Sablon or Notre-Dame-de-Lourdes at the end of 19th century. In 1884, the post office opened.

The area was first incorporated in 1963 as part of the Municipality of Côte-Nord-du-Golfe-du-Saint-Laurent, but separated on January 1, 1990, and became the Municipality of Blanc-Sablon.

100 acres (50 hectares) of land in Blanc-Sablon were designated a National Historic Site of Canada in 2007, as they contain over 60 archaeological sites relating to 9000 years of human occupation, including the Archaic, Dorset and European periods.

== Geography ==
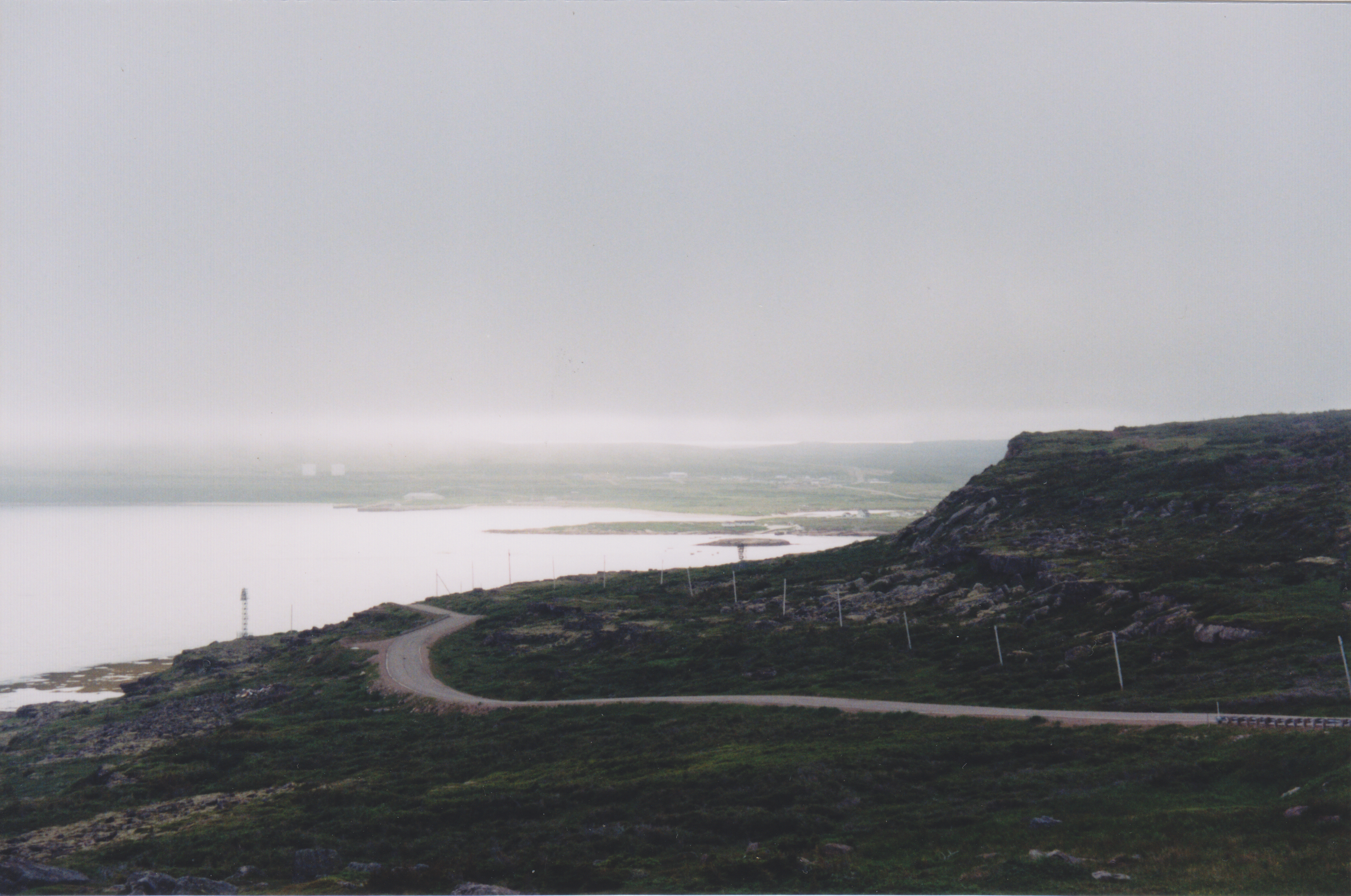
Strait of Belle Isle, Bvrd. Docteur-Camille-Marcoux, (Route nº 138), Blanc Sablon

Blanc-Sablon is located on the north coast of the Gulf of St. Lawrence near the entrance of the Strait of Belle Isle. Two significant bays, Brador and Blanc-Sablon, mark its shores and the headland that separates these bays is dominated by Mont Parent, a 100 m (330 ft) high flat-topped hill named after Martin Parent, a local fisherman in the middle of the 19th century. The municipality borders Côte-Nord-du-Golfe-du-Saint-Laurent to the south-west, and L'Anse-au-Clair, Labrador, to the north-east.

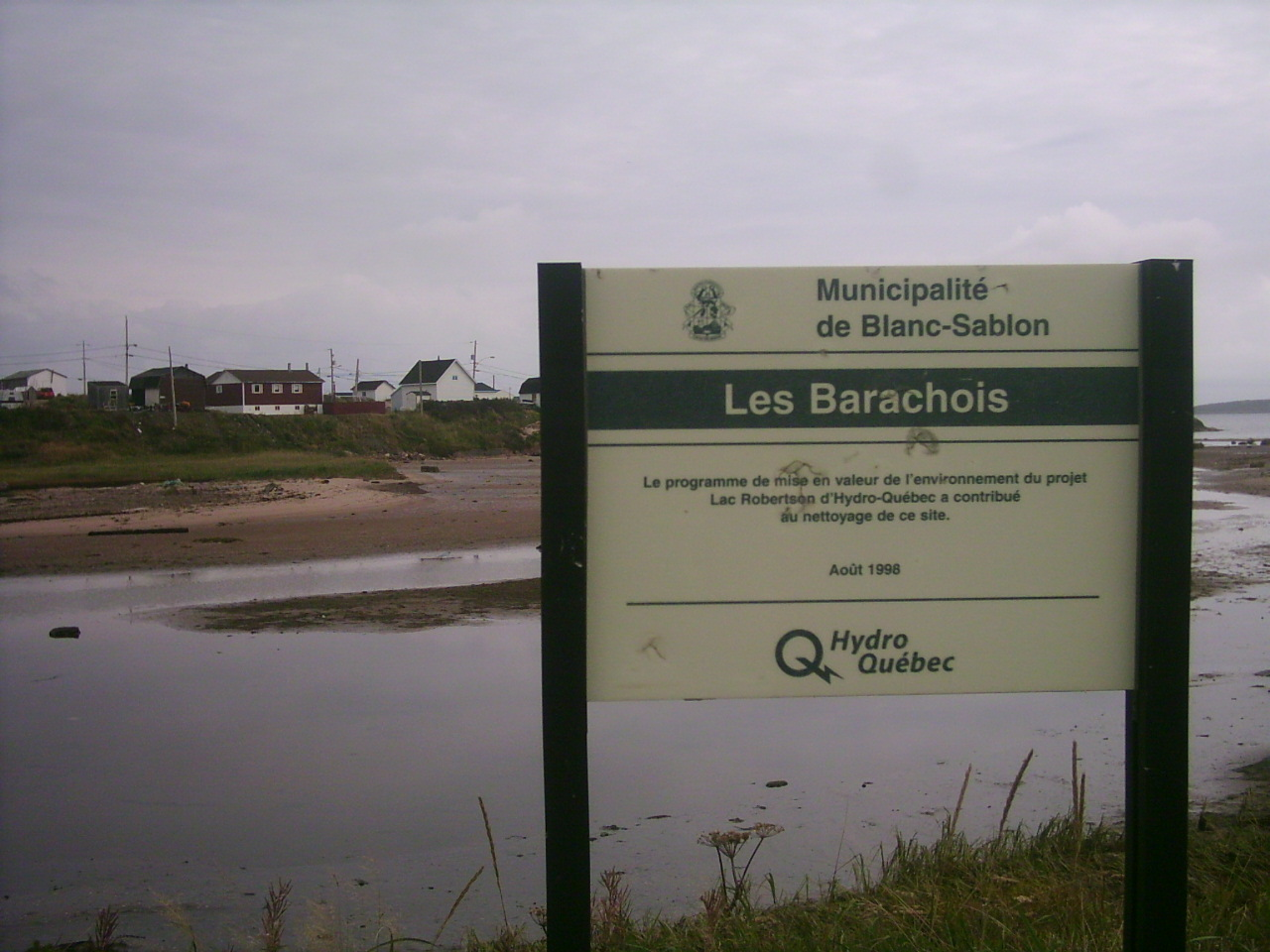
The "Barachois" in Blanc-Sablon, in Quebec

The estuary of the Brador River and Blanc-Sablon River has a lagoon designated barachois, separated from the sea by sand or gravel. Seawater enters at high tide.

The Blanc-Sablon archipelago is located off the coasts of the villages of Blanc-Sablon and Brador and includes Long Island, Lazy Island, Basin Island, Island of the Parrots, Wood Island and Greenly, housing the Bird Sanctuary of Brador Bay.

The municipality of Blanc-Sablon has several land protrusions into the Gulf of St. Lawrence; from east to west, they are Point Saint-Charles, Morel's Point, Lazy Point, Hunting Point, "À la Barque" Point, Cape Crow and Point Jones.

=== Time zone ===
Blanc Sablon is located in the Atlantic Time Zone (Atlantic Standard Time or AST). The offset of the applicable time relative to UTC is -04:00 In accordance with the applicable time and longitude, the average solar noon in Blanc Sablon occurs at 11:48.

=== Climate ===
Blanc-Sablon experiences a subarctic climate (Köppen climate classification Dfc). It has short, cool summers, and very long and snowy winters: the mean snowfall is 375.3 cm (147.8 in). Although its latitude is only 51 degrees north, and its climate is tempered by the Atlantic Ocean, it experiences a much colder climate than other localities at the same latitude due to the cold Labrador Current. For example, London, England, on the same latitude, has an annual mean that is nearly 10 °C (18 °F) milder, and inland Calgary, despite being around 1,050 m (3,440 ft) above sea level, is still almost 4 °C (7.2 °F) warmer despite recording extreme minima about 11 °C (20 °F) colder.

Climate data for Blanc-Sablon (Lourdes-de-Blanc-Sablon Airport) WMO ID: 71808; coordinates 51°27′N 57°11′W; elevation: 37.2 m (122 ft); 1991–2020 normals, extremes 1982–present
| Month | Jan | Feb | Mar | Apr | May | Jun | Jul | Aug | Sep | Oct | Nov | Dec | Year |
|---|---|---|---|---|---|---|---|---|---|---|---|---|---|
| Record high humidex | 9.6 | 12.6 | 7.3 | 18.6 | 24.4 | 28.0 | 31.4 | 30.6 | 28.7 | 20.8 | 18.0 | 10.4 | 30.6 |
| Record high °C (°F) | 9.1 (48.4) | 8.3 (46.9) | 8.2 (46.8) | 18.6 (65.5) | 25.0 (77.0) | 27.1 (80.8) | 27.1 (80.8) | 28.1 (82.6) | 24.7 (76.5) | 21.0 (69.8) | 16.2 (61.2) | 11.0 (51.8) | 28.1 (82.6) |
| Mean daily maximum °C (°F) | −7.1 (19.2) | −7.0 (19.4) | −2.8 (27.0) | 2.0 (35.6) | 7.8 (46.0) | 12.5 (54.5) | 15.9 (60.6) | 17.1 (62.8) | 13.3 (55.9) | 7.7 (45.9) | 2.3 (36.1) | −3.1 (26.4) | 4.9 (40.8) |
| Daily mean °C (°F) | −11.8 (10.8) | −11.5 (11.3) | −6.9 (19.6) | −1.4 (29.5) | 3.8 (38.8) | 8.4 (47.1) | 12.1 (53.8) | 13.4 (56.1) | 9.4 (48.9) | 4.4 (39.9) | −1.1 (30.0) | −7.0 (19.4) | 1.0 (33.8) |
| Mean daily minimum °C (°F) | −16.4 (2.5) | −16.0 (3.2) | −11.0 (12.2) | −4.8 (23.4) | −0.3 (31.5) | 4.2 (39.6) | 8.3 (46.9) | 9.6 (49.3) | 5.4 (41.7) | 1.0 (33.8) | −4.5 (23.9) | −11.0 (12.2) | −3.0 (26.6) |
| Record low °C (°F) | −32.3 (−26.1) | −34.1 (−29.4) | −32.5 (−26.5) | −23.0 (−9.4) | −11.1 (12.0) | −3.6 (25.5) | 0.0 (32.0) | 0.9 (33.6) | −4.8 (23.4) | −10.4 (13.3) | −18.9 (−2.0) | −30.2 (−22.4) | −34.1 (−29.4) |
| Record low wind chill | −48.5 | −48.2 | −47.6 | −34.4 | −16.2 | −7.3 | 0.0 | 0.0 | −8.6 | −22.4 | −31.4 | −47.4 | −48.5 |
| Average precipitation mm (inches) | 76.5 (3.01) | 81.2 (3.20) | 91.2 (3.59) | 53.2 (2.09) | 66.9 (2.63) | 78.3 (3.08) | 93.9 (3.70) | 91.2 (3.59) | 101.7 (4.00) | 85.0 (3.35) | 83.8 (3.30) | 98.4 (3.87) | 1,001.1 (39.41) |
| Average rainfall mm (inches) | 12.3 (0.48) | 6.9 (0.27) | 11.9 (0.47) | 21.2 (0.83) | 63.5 (2.50) | 79.4 (3.13) | 92.8 (3.65) | 86.6 (3.41) | 102.1 (4.02) | 77.1 (3.04) | 58.9 (2.32) | 31.7 (1.25) | 644.2 (25.36) |
| Average snowfall cm (inches) | 66.2 (26.1) | 70.0 (27.6) | 73.9 (29.1) | 32.4 (12.8) | 6.8 (2.7) | 0.1 (0.0) | 0.0 (0.0) | 0.0 (0.0) | 0.0 (0.0) | 3.9 (1.5) | 24.2 (9.5) | 68.3 (26.9) | 345.9 (136.2) |
| Average precipitation days (≥ 0.2 mm) | 16.6 | 16.4 | 17.5 | 14.2 | 14.3 | 14.7 | 16.7 | 15.0 | 14.6 | 15.4 | 15.6 | 17.1 | 188.1 |
| Average rainy days (≥ 0.2 mm) | 3.2 | 2.2 | 4.2 | 7.5 | 12.6 | 14.5 | 16.6 | 14.2 | 14.2 | 14.5 | 10.1 | 5.5 | 119.2 |
| Average snowy days (≥ 0.2 cm) | 15.3 | 15.4 | 14.9 | 8.4 | 2.7 | 0.15 | 0.0 | 0.0 | 0.0 | 1.8 | 8.0 | 14.7 | 81.3 |
| Average relative humidity (%) (at 1500 LST) | 73.3 | 72.4 | 75.7 | 76.6 | 72.7 | 75.8 | 81.2 | 79.6 | 76.8 | 76.6 | 76.8 | 76.2 | 76.1 |
| Mean monthly sunshine hours | 93.9 | 106.7 | 111.7 | 137.6 | 157.5 | 165.3 | 141.9 | 159.0 | 128.9 | 106.2 | 85.1 | 75.8 | 1,469.4 |
| Percentage possible sunshine | 36.0 | 37.9 | 30.4 | 33.1 | 32.6 | 33.3 | 28.4 | 35.2 | 33.9 | 32.0 | 31.8 | 30.8 | 32.9 |
Source: Environment and Climate Change Canada (sunshine 1981–2010)

=== Communities ===
The municipality includes three villages: Blanc-Sablon, Lourdes-de-Blanc-Sablon, and Brador Bay.

==== Blanc-Sablon ====
Blanc-Sablon is located about one kilometre (1000 yards) east of Lourdes-de-Blanc-Sablon directly on the Blanc-Sablon Bay. It had a population of 116 in 2016. The wharf and the ferry to St. Barbe, Newfoundland and Labrador are located in the town.

==== Lourdes-de-Blanc-Sablon ====
Indigenous peoples, Vikings, Basques, Bretons, English and Acadians frequented, at different times, the waters of the territory of this important village on the Quebec-Labrador Peninsula. Lourdes-de-Blanc-Sablon (51°24′41″N 57°12′11″W) is the largest community in the municipality, and is located on the headland that separates Brador Bay from Blanc-Sablon Bay. It was originally known as Longue-Pointe (Long Point) until the beginning of the 20th century. It has a small natural harbour, and long depended on the fishing business.

==== Brador ====
Brador or Brador Bay (51°27′40″N 57°14′44″W) is on the eastern shore of the namesake bay, 7 km (4.3 mi) north of the village of Lourdes-de-Blanc-Sablon. While known in the 18th century as Fort Pontchartrain and Phélipeaux Bay, its current name is the shortened form of Labrador. In French, the syllable la is a definite article, and in documents from the 17th and 18th century, this syllable was considered as such and separated from the rest of the name. François Martel de Brouague, the King's Commander of this region from 1714 to 1760, referred to this location as: "A la Baye de Phélipeaux, coste de la Brador" ("At the Bay of Phélipeaux, coast of the Brador").

== Demographics ==
=== Population ===
Canada census – Blanc-Sablon community profile

| | 2021 | 2016 | 2011 |
| Population | 1,122 (+0.9% from 2016) | 1112 (-0.5% from 2011) | 1,118 (-11.5% from 2006) |
| Land area | 234.98 km^{2} (90.73 sq mi) | 247.94 km^{2} (95.73 sq mi) | 247.63 km^{2} (95.61 sq mi) |
| Population density | 4.8/km^{2} (12/sq mi) | 4.5/km^{2} (12/sq mi) | 4.5/km^{2} (12/sq mi) |
| Median age | 46.0 (M: 47.2, F: 45.2) | 45.7 (M: 45.7, F: 45.8) | 43.5 (M: 43.7, F: 43.4) |
| Private dwellings | 503 (total) 464 (occupied) | 460 (total) | 508 (total) |
| Median household income | $89,000 | $81,664 | $66,241 |

References: 2021 2016 2011

Historical Census Data - Blanc-Sablon, Quebec

| Year | Pop. | ±% |
|---|---|---|
| 1991 | 1,211 | — |
| 1996 | 1,248 | +3.1% |
| 2001 | 1,201 | −3.8% |
| 2006 | 1,263 | +5.2% |

| Year | Pop. | ±% |
|---|---|---|
| 2011 | 1,118 | −11.5% |
| 2016 | 1,112 | −0.5% |
| 2021 | 1,122 | +0.9% |

Source: Statistics Canada

=== Language ===
Canada Census Mother Tongue - Blanc-Sablon, Quebec
| Census | Total | French | | | English | | | French & English | | | Other | | |
| Year | Responses | Count | Trend | Pop % | Count | Trend | Pop % | Count | Trend | Pop % | Count | Trend | Pop % |
| 2021 | 1,090 | 225 | ▼21.1% | 20.6% | 820 | ▲4.5% | 75.2% | 35 | ▲133.3% | 3.2% | 10 | ▲100.0% | 0.9% |
| 2016 | 1,095 | 285 | ▼9.5% | 26.0% | 785 | ▲6.1% | 71.7% | 15 | ▼25.0% | 1.4% | 5 | 0.0% | 0.5% |
| 2011 | 1,080 | 315 | ▼4.5% | 29.2% | 740 | ▼15.9% | 68.5% | 20 | ▼42.9% | 1.9% | 5 | ▲ n/a% | 0.5% |
| 2006 | 1,245 | 330 | ▼16.5% | 26.5% | 880 | ▲15.9% | 70.7% | 35 | ▼30.0% | 2.8% | 0 | 0.0% | 0.0% |
| 2001 | 1,185 | 395 | ▲11.4% | 33.3% | 740 | ▼13.5% | 62.5% | 50 | ▲30.0% | 4.2% | 0 | 0.0% | 0.0% |
| 1996 | 1,240 | 350 | n/a | 28.2% | 855 | n/a | 69.0% | 35 | n/a | 2.8% | 0 | n/a | 0.0% |

== Transportation ==
=== Sea access ===
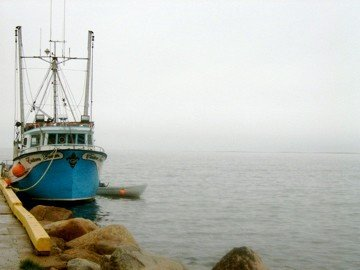
Fishing boat, Blanc-Sablon harbour

Being at the eastern end of Quebec Côte-Nord region, Blanc-Sablon is served by the Bella Desgagnés a passenger/cargo ship sailing, from the St. Lawrence Estuary to Gulf of St. Lawrence and Strait of Belle Isle, connecting with the coastal communities of Rimouski, Sept-Îles, Port-Menier (Anticosti Island), Havre-Saint-Pierre, Natashquan, Kegaska, La Romaine, Harrington Harbour, Tête-à-la-Baleine, La Tabatière, Saint-Augustin and Blanc-Sablon. This service is funded by the Government of Quebec.

The ferry service's main goal is to make up for the 425 km (264 mi) gap in Route 138, which remains unbuilt between Kegashka and Old Fort (in Bonne-Espérance).

Blanc-Sablon is also the northern terminus of a ferry service across the Strait of Belle Isle to the island of Newfoundland, mainly serving as a connection with nearby Labrador. This 28 km (17 mi)-long ferry service, operated by the Roll-on/roll-off Qajaq W, is funded entirely by the government of Newfoundland and Labrador and connects with a southern terminus at St. Barbe on Newfoundland island's Great Northern Peninsula. During winter months, ice conditions sometimes require the service to divert to Corner Brook instead of St. Barbe.

Ports of the Gulf of St. Lawrence, on the Côte-Nord Shore: Blanc-Sablon, Harrington Harbor, Natashquan, Havre-Saint-Pierre, Mingan, Port-Menier (Anticosti Island), Cap-aux-Meules (Îles-de-la-Madeleine).

Marine infrastructure and ferrys

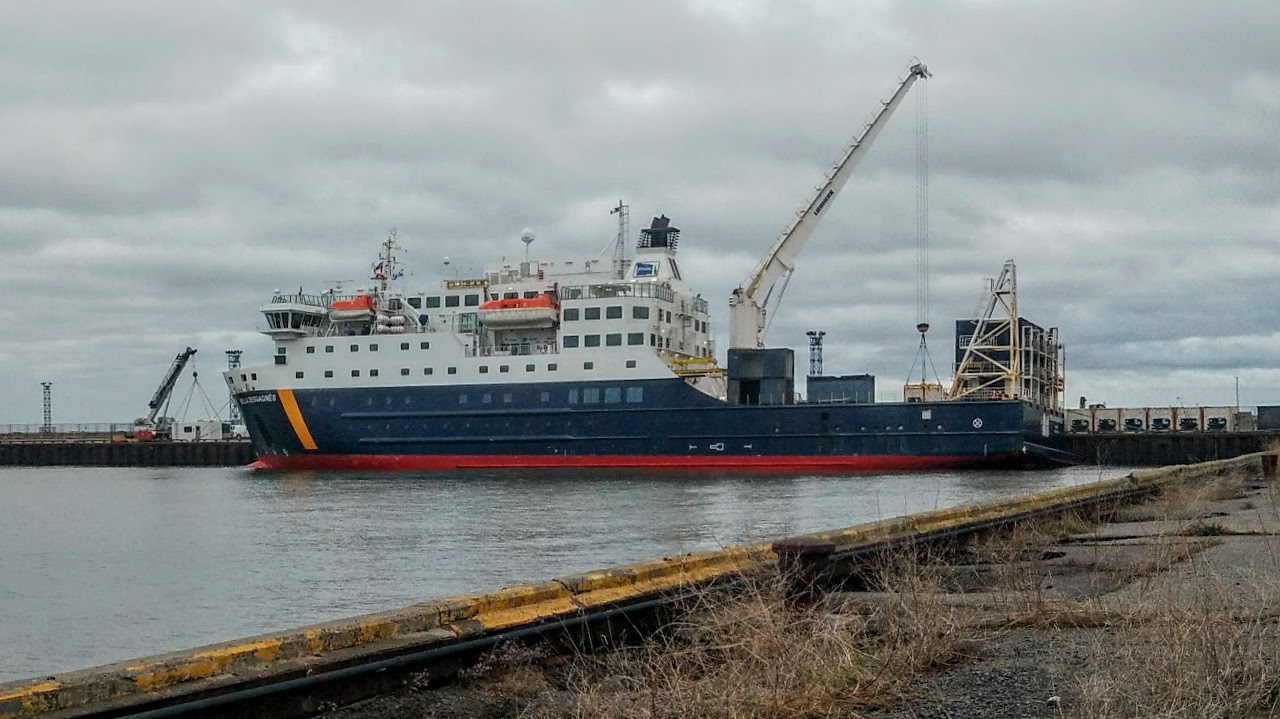
Motor vessel Bella-Desgagnes loading at Rimouski-Est, port, St. Lawrence Estuary, Quebec

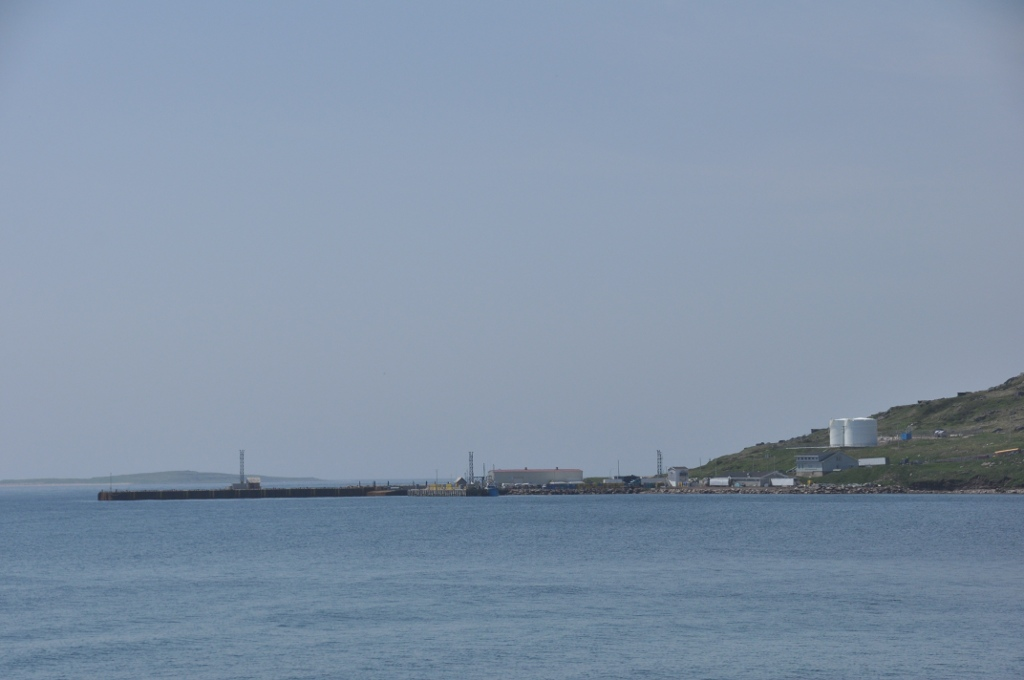
Blanc-Sablon ferry terminal, Blanc-Sablon Bay, Strait of Belle Isle, Quebec

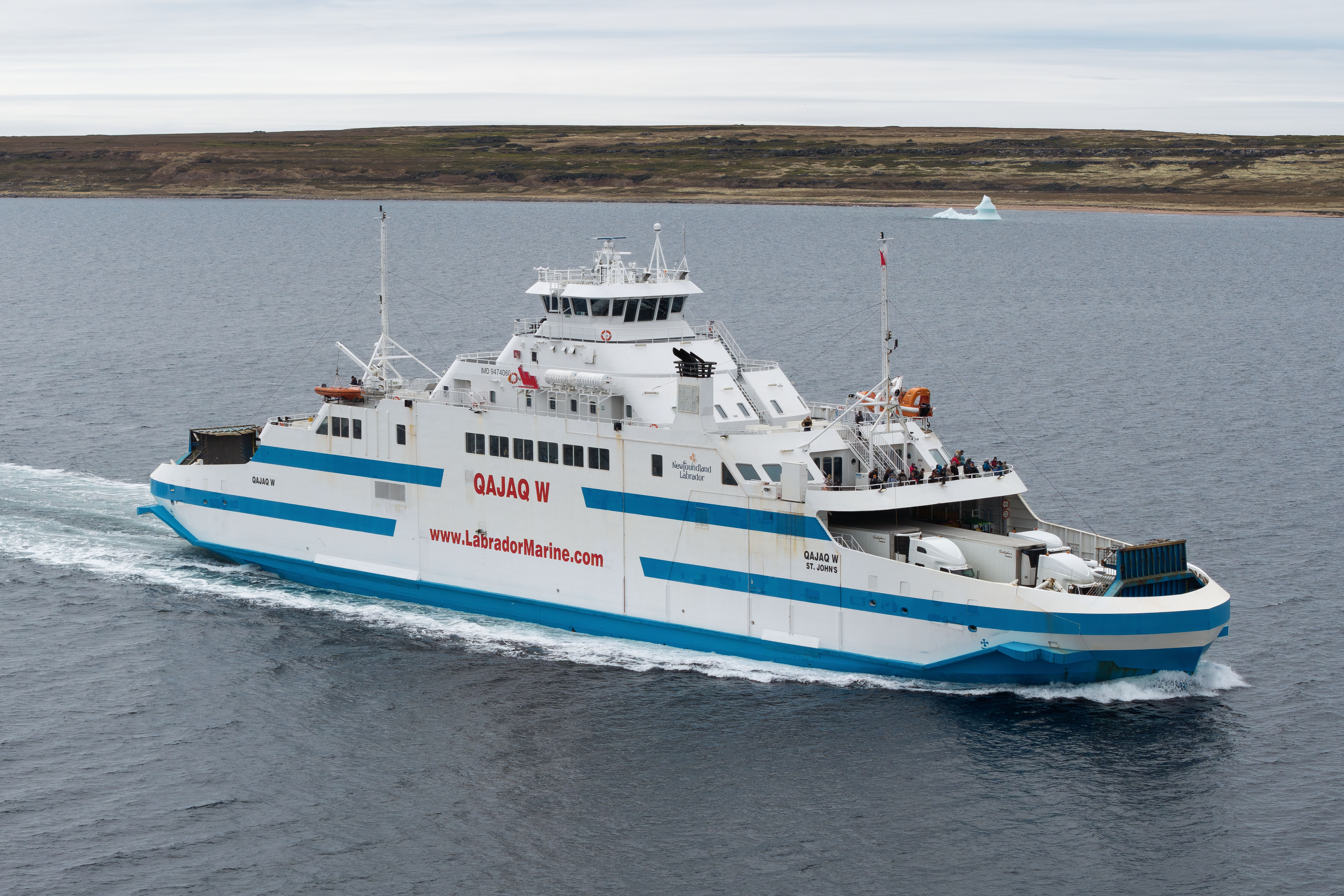
Labrador Marine Roll-on/roll-off ferry Qajaq W entering Blanc-Sablon, 2026

=== Road access ===
At present, Blanc-Sablon is inaccessible directly via the rest of the Quebec road network. From the west, Route 138 has been built to the village of Kegashka; then following a 425 km (264 mi) gap, a 69 km (43 mi) segment restarts at the village of Old Fort and continues to Blanc-Sablon, ending at the border with Labrador near L'Anse-au-Clair where it becomes the Trans-Labrador Highway (Route 510). To travel to the rest of Quebec from Blanc-Sablon, a traveller can take the Relais Nordik ferry (not drive-on/off, but can accommodate cars in shipping containers), or drive via Route 510 through Labrador for approximately 1,130 km (700 mi) to re-enter Quebec at the town of Fermont; then 560 km (350 mi) of Route 389 from Fermont to Baie-Comeau, passing to the east of Manicouagan Reservoir. From there Route 138 leads west to points further on like Quebec City or Montreal. This trip by the north (between Baie-Comeau and Blanc-Sablon) is 1,722 km (1,070 mi).

=== Air travel ===
The Lourdes-de-Blanc-Sablon Airport provides scheduled air service to Blanc-Sablon.

== Education ==
Centre de services scolaire du Littoral operates:

- Mgr-Scheffer School (anglophone and francophone) in Lourdes-de-Blanc-Sablon
- St-Theresa School (for adults) in Blanc-Sablon

== See also ==
- Border between Quebec and Newfoundland and Labrador
- List of anglophone communities in Quebec
- List of municipalities in Quebec
