= St. Barbe =

Unincorporated settlement in Newfoundland and Labrador, Canada

- Unincorporated settlement
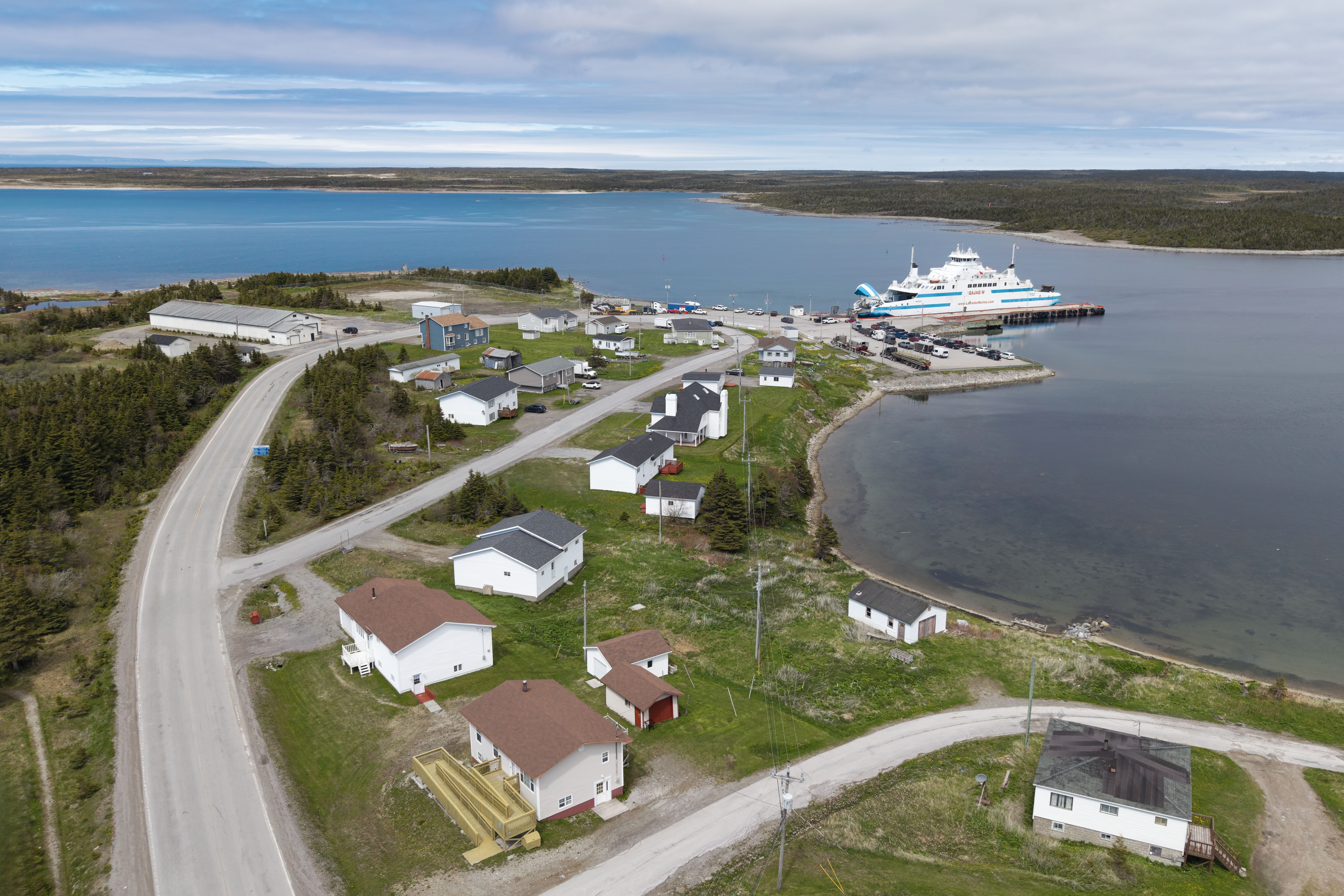
- Aerial view of St. Barbe, with MV Qajaq W docked at the ferry terminal

- Location of St. Barbe in Newfoundland and Labrador St. Barbe (Canada)
- Coordinates: 51.200°N 56.753°W
- Country: Canada
- Province: Newfoundland and Labrador
- Region: Newfoundland
- Census division: Division No. 9
- Census subdivision: Division No. 9, Subdivision C

Government
  - Type: Local service district
  - Body: Pidgeon Cove-St. Barbe local service district committee
  - Chair: Dion Dredge

Area
  - Land: 2.09 km^{2} (0.81 sq mi)

Population (2021)
  - Total: 121
  - Density: 57.9/km^{2} (150/sq mi)
  - Designated place: Pidgeon Cove-St. Barbe
- Time zone: UTC−03:30 (NST)
  - Summer (DST): UTC−02:30 (NDT)
- Postal code: A0K 1M0
- Area code: 709
- Highways: Route 430
- Ferry route: St. Barbe–Blanc-Sablon
- Waterways: Strait of Belle Isle

St. Barbe is an unincorporated settlement in Newfoundland and Labrador, Canada. It is located on the Great Northern Peninsula of the island of Newfoundland, near Pidgeon Cove, and forms part of the Pidgeon Cove-St. Barbe local service district and designated place. In the 2021 Census, Pidgeon Cove-St. Barbe had a population of 121.

St. Barbe is an important transportation point on the Great Northern Peninsula. The community is the Newfoundland terminal of the ferry route across the Strait of Belle Isle to Blanc-Sablon, Quebec, near the Labrador border.

== Geography ==
St. Barbe is located in northwestern Newfoundland, on Route 430, near St. Barbe Bay and the Strait of Belle Isle. The community lies within Division No. 9, Subdivision C.

== Transportation ==
The St. Barbe ferry terminal is the island of Newfoundland terminal for the St. Barbe–Blanc-Sablon ferry. The route is served by MV Qajaq W, which carries vehicles and passengers across the Strait of Belle Isle. The crossing between St. Barbe and Blanc-Sablon is approximately 36 km (22 mi) and normally takes about 1 hour and 45 minutes.

== Government and demographics ==
St. Barbe and Pidgeon Cove are administered as the Local Service District of Pidgeon Cove-St. Barbe. The Government of Newfoundland and Labrador's 2026 local service district directory lists Dion Dredge as chair of the local service district committee.

As a designated place in the 2021 Census of Population conducted by Statistics Canada, Pidgeon Cove-St. Barbe recorded a population of 121, a decrease from 135 in 2016. It had a land area of 2.09 km^{2} (0.81 sq mi) and a population density of 57.9/km^{2} (150.0/sq mi).

== Community ==
St. Barbe has served as a regional travel and service point because of its ferry connection to Labrador and Quebec. Community facilities have included a regional arena and an RV service centre for travellers on the Great Northern Peninsula and the Labrador ferry route.

== See also ==
- St. Barbe Bay
- Blanc-Sablon, Quebec
- Newfoundland and Labrador Route 430
- Newfoundland-Labrador fixed link
- Strait of Belle Isle
- Flower's Cove
