= Augustin le Gardeur de Courtemanche =

Canadian soldier and ambassador

- Born: 16 December 1663; Quebec City
- Died: 29 June 1717 (aged 53); Labrador
- Occupations: soldier and ambassador
- Spouse: Marie-Charlotte Charest
- Children: François Martel de Brouague (step-son)
- Parent(s): Pierre Legardeur de Repentigny & Marie Favery

Augustin le Gardeur de Courtemanche (December 16, 1663 – June 29, 1717) was a French-Canadian soldier and ambassador from Labrador.

== Biography ==
Born in Quebec City on December 16, 1663, Augustin le Gardeur de Courtemanche joined the military in 1690, serving under René Robinau de Portneuf on his expedition to New England during King William's War. He distinguished himself during the capture of Fort Pejpescot in Casco Bay. In April 1691, Governor General of New France Louis de Buade de Frontenac sent de Courtemanch to Fort Michilimackinac to inform nearby natives of the French victory.

In 1693, he was assigne to Nicolas d'Ailleboust de Manthet, who was defending against the Mohawk nation. On April 1, 1694, he was given a company and sent to Fort St. Joseph on the bank of the St. Joseph River. Louis-Hector de Callière sent de Courtemanche to France in 1698 to inform Louis XIV of the death of de Frontenac and to request de Callière as the next Governor General. For his efforts, which were successful, de Courtemanche was named a captain on his return. He spent the late 1690s pursuing commercial interests with trader Raymond Martel.

In the fall of 1700, he was sent with Jean Enjalran to convince the Iroquois and the Odawa to make a peace deal in Montréal. That December, he became one of the first of European descent to visit the place that would become Chicago. He found a tribe of Wea and Miami preparing for war. He was able to convince Miami chief Chickikatalo to return with him. De Courtemanche was granted a ten-year land concession adjacent to the Strait of Belle Isle, giving him exclusive seal hunting and Indian trading rights there. He probably returned to Labrador in 1704, as a wrote a memoir to its intendant, Jacques Raudot, describing his military service. On November 12, 1712, de Courtemanche was named commandant of Labrador, tasked with enduring its fishing interests.

De Courtemanche married Marie-Charlotte Charest on July 20, 1697. He died on June 29, 1717. His step-son François Martel de Brouague succeeded him as commandant of Labrador.
