= Kécarpoui River =

Kécarpoui River Rivière Kécarpoui
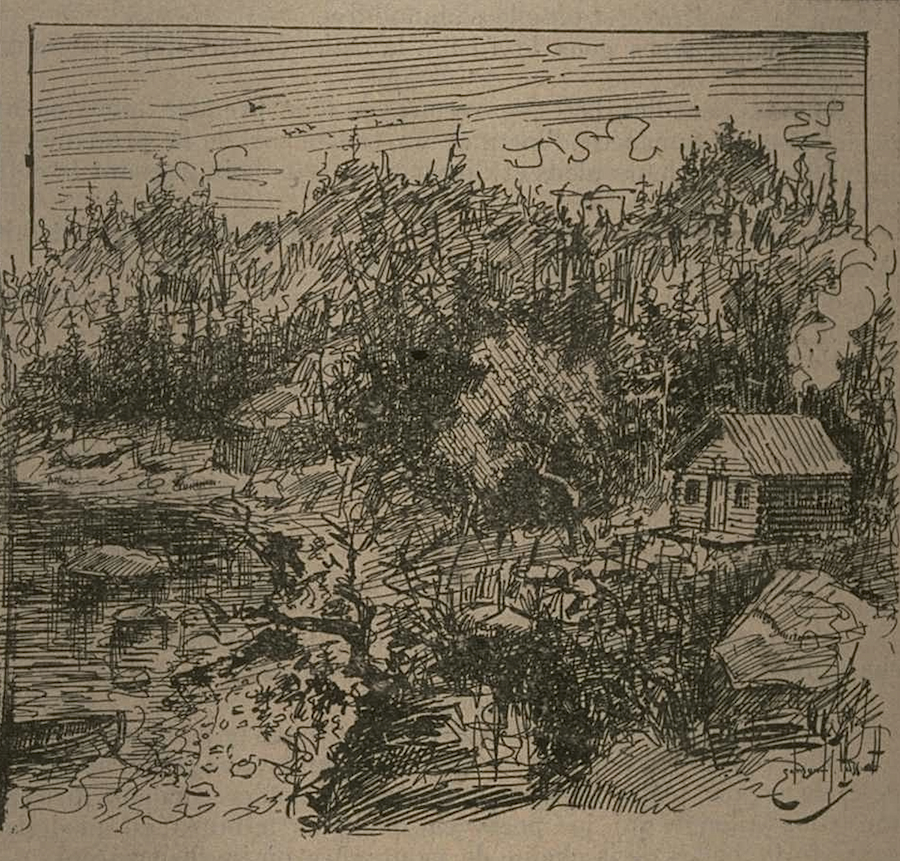
- La baie de Kécarpoui, 1897

- Location within Quebec

Location
- Country: Canada
- Province: Quebec
- Region: Côte-Nord
- RCM: Le Golfe-du-Saint-Laurent

Physical characteristics
- Mouth: Gulf of Saint Lawrence
  - coordinates: 51.0619444°N 58.8338889°W
  - elevation: 0 metres (0 ft)
- Length: 27 kilometres (17 mi)
- Basin size: 696 square kilometres (269 sq mi)

The Kécarpoui River (French: Rivière Kécarpoui) is a salmon river in the Côte-Nord region of Quebec, Canada. It flows south and empties into the Gulf of Saint Lawrence.

== Location ==
The Kécarpoui River is a narrow river, 27 kilometres (17 mi) long. The mouth of the river is in the municipality of Gros-Mécatina in Le Golfe-du-Saint-Laurent Regional County Municipality. The Kécarpoui Archipelago is a group of islands in the Gulf opposite the river mouth. Kécarpoui is an Innu language word meaning "porcupine river".

== Description ==
The Dictionnaire des rivières et lacs de la province de Québec (1914) says of the river,

This river flows across the mountains of the Laurentides and empties into the Gulf of Saint Lawrence about fifteen miles from the Saint-Augustin River. From the high tide mark up to lake Kécarpoui the river is not navigable, even for canoes. According to the surveyor J.C. Giraud (report of 1901) there is no land suitable for cultivation on the sides of this river or the lakes that feed it. The trees are fir and spruce with dimensions of no more than 7 to 8 inches in diameter. Salmon and trout frequent this river. The river is frequented by hunters for game and fur, which they find in quantity. Kécarpoui comes from a montagnais word meaning "where there is ribbon [ruban]".

== Basin ==
The Kécarpoui River basin covers 696 square kilometres (269 sq mi). It lies between the basins of the Véco River to the west and the Saint-Augustin River to the east. It is partly in the unorganized territory of Petit-Mécatina and partly in the municipalities of Gros-Mécatina and Saint-Augustin. The Lac-Robertson Generating Station, which is powered by a dam on the Véco River, is in the Kécarpoui basin.

== Environment ==
A map of the ecological regions of Quebec shows the Kécarpoui River in sub-regions 6o-T, 6n-T and 6m-T of the east spruce/moss subdomain. Vegetation in the basin is dominated by conifers. Mammals include black bear, moose, boreal woodland caribou, wolf, fox, lynx, muskrat, mink, otter and porcupine. There are seabird colonies on the many islands and islets near the river mouth.

== Fishing ==
The Kécarpoui River is recognized as an Atlantic salmon river. The river bed is composed of medium-sized rocks. Salmon swim up the river for 19 kilometres (12 mi). They average 2.2 to 4.8 kilograms (4.9 to 10.6 lb) in weight. In 2013–2017 an average of 7 salmon were reported caught each year. The Pourvoirie Kecarpoui/Kecarpoui Outpost provides outfitting services. They do not have an exclusive right. They offer 6-day guided fishing expeditions that visit the Véco, Kecarpoui, Saint-Augustin, Coxipi, Chécatica, Napetipi rivers and the Baie des roches.

== Sources ==
- Archipel-de-Kécarpoui (in French), Commission de toponymie du Québec
- Bilan de l’exploitation du saumon au Québec en 2018 (PDF) (in French), Ministère des Forêts, de la Faune et des Parcs, May 2019
- Bourdon, Philippe; Ibrahim, Ghassen; Luce, Myriam; NantobBikatui, N'Binkéna; Othoniel, Clara; Tremblay, Yohann (April 2015), Portrait préliminaire de la zone de gestion intégrée de l'eau par bassin versant (PDF) (in French), OBV Duplessis
- Lac-Robertson, Seuil aval du (in French), Ministère de l’Environnement et de la Lutte contre les changements climatiques
- Liste des rivières à saumon (PDF) (in French), Quebec government, archived from the original (PDF) on 2018-12-28
- Pourvoirie Kecarpoui (in French), Pourvoirie Kecarpoui
- Rivière Kécarpoui (in French), Ressources naturelles Canada
- Rouillard, Eugène (1914), "Kécarpoui , (Rivière)", Dictionnaire des rivières et lacs de la province de Québec (in French), Québec. Département des terres et forêts
- Rivière Kécarpoui (in French), Saumon Québec
- Saucier, J.-P.; Robitaille, A.; Grondin, P.; Bergeron, J.-F.; Gosselin, J. (2011), Les régions écologiques du Québec méridional (PDF) (map), 4 (in French), Ministère des Ressources naturelles et de la Faune, archived from the original (PDF) on 2020-06-19
