= Saint-Augustin River =

Saint-Augustin River Rivière Saint-Augustin
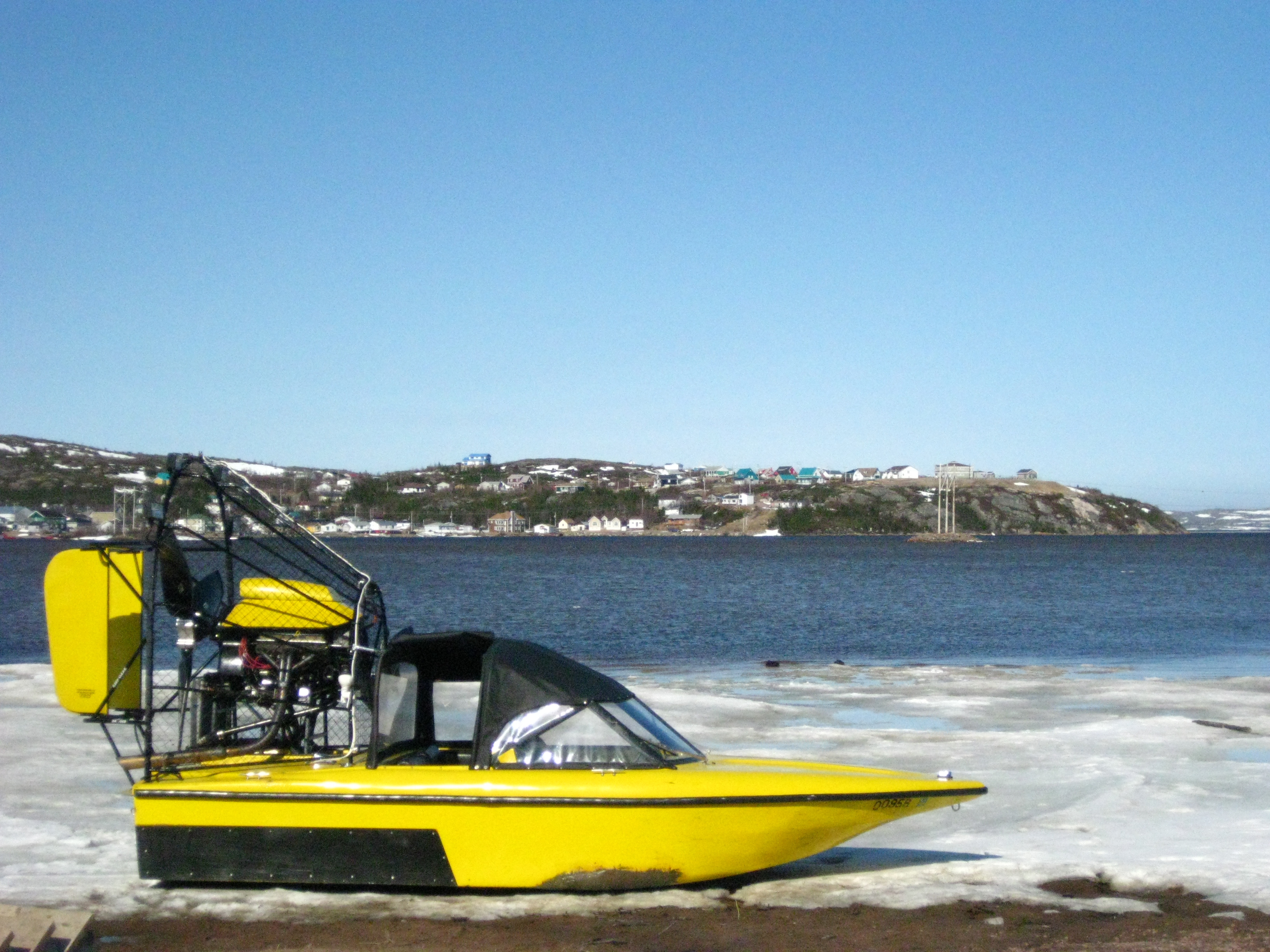
- Mouth of the river, looking across to Saint-Augustin from Pakuashipi

- Location within Quebec

Location
- Country: Canada
- Province: Quebec
- Region: Côte-Nord
- RCM: Le Golfe-du-Saint-Laurent

Physical characteristics
- Mouth: Gulf of Saint Lawrence
  - coordinates: 51.2177778°N 58.6355556°W
  - elevation: 0 metres (0 ft)
- Length: 238 kilometres (148 mi)
- Basin size: 9,892 square kilometres (3,819 sq mi)
- Discharge
  - average: 146 to 207 cubic metres per second (5,200 to 7,300 cu ft/s).
  - minimum: 10.8 cubic metres per second (380 cu ft/s)
  - maximum: 2,040 cubic metres per second (72,000 cu ft/s)

The Saint-Augustin River (French: Rivière Saint-Augustin, pronounced [ʁivjɛʁ sɛ̃t‿oɡystɛ̃]; Innu: Pakut-shipu) is a salmon river in the Côte-Nord region of Quebec, Canada. It empties into the Gulf of Saint Lawrence.

== Location ==
The Saint-Augustin River has its source in the mountains of Labrador, and winds south to Saint-Augustin Bay. 109 kilometres (68 mi) of the 238 kilometres (148 mi) main channel is in Labrador. Major tributaries include Matse River, Michaels River, Rivière à la Mouche and Rivière Saint-Augustin Nord-Ouest. The Saint-Augustin Northwest River joins the Saint-Augustin River 1 kilometre (0.62 mi) upstream from its mouth. The mouth of the river is in the municipality of Saint-Augustin in Le Golfe-du-Saint-Laurent Regional County Municipality.

At the mouth of the river the Pakuashipi ("sand river") Innu community is on the west shore and the village of Saint-Augustine is spread over hills on the east shore. The two communities are accessible only by sea or air. A barge is used to carry goods across the river, and a hovercraft takes passengers. A new barge was due to be delivered in 2020. The free passenger ferry takes five minutes to make the 0.9 kilometres (0.56 mi) crossing, but only runs between April and December. After the river has frozen over it can be crossed by snowmobile over the "Route Blanche" ice bridge.

== Name ==
Louis Jolliet (1645–1700) called the river Pegouasiou, and Jean-Baptiste-Louis Franquelin (1650–1712) called it Pegouachiou, meaning "deceptive river", probably given that name by the indigenous people because of it is shallow and the sandbars in its mouth are unstable. The name Saint-Augustin was given to the river in the 18th century, and then to the village on the east shore of its mouth. The name may refer to Augustin d'Hippone, a priest, or to Augustin le Gardeur de Courtemanche (1663–1717), first concessionaire of a strip of land that extended "from the river called Kegaska to that named Kesesakion".

== Basin ==
The Saint-Augustin River basin covers 9,892 square kilometres (3,819 sq mi). It lies between the basins of the Kécarpoui River to the west and the Coxipi River to the east. 40.4% of the watershed is in Labrador. The Quebec portion is partly in the unorganized territory of Petit-Mécatina and partly in the municipality of Saint-Augustin. The Pakuashipi Innu community is in the river basin.

The Saint-Augustin River has Strahler number 7. The headwaters of the main channel form at an elevation of 570 metres (1,870 ft). The maximum elevation in the watershed in 592 metres (1,942 ft), and the average elevation is 342 metres (1,122 ft). The river drops about 460 metres (1,510 ft) in the Labrador section, then drops only 100 metres (330 ft) in the last 120 kilometres (75 mi).

A hydrometric station recorded flows from 1967 to 1982. Mean annual flows ranged from 146 to 207 cubic metres per second (5,200 to 7,300 cu ft/s). Minimum flow in the winter was 10.8 cubic metres per second (380 cu ft/s) and maximum flow in May/June was 2,040 cubic metres per second (72,000 cu ft/s).

== Environment ==
A map of the ecological regions of Quebec shows the river in sub-regions 6o-T, 6n-T and 6m-S of the east spruce/moss subdomain. Land cover in the watershed is 74.3% forest, 12.9% non-forest vegetation, 3.1% barren, 1.3% wetlands and 8% water. Average daily mean temperature is 0 to 1.2 °C (32.0 to 34.2 °F), ranging from −16.5 to −12.8 °C (2.3 to 9.0 °F) in January to 13.9 to 15.2 °C (57.0 to 59.4 °F) in July. Annual total precipitation is 1,005.4–1,122.4 millimetres (39.58–44.19 in).

From the river mouth it is possible to see a wide variety of sea birds as well as seals and whales. The St. Augustine Migratory Bird Sanctuary is a nesting area for seagull, tern, ring-billed gull, herring gull, penguin, black guillemot and common eider.

== Fishing ==
The river is recognized as an Atlantic salmon (Salmo salar) river. The Pourvoirie Kecarpoui arranges fishing/camping expeditions that include the Véco, Kécarpoui, Saint-Augustin, Coxipi, Chécatica and Napetipi rivers.

== Sources ==
- Bordeleau, Jean-Louis (10 May 2019), Une nouvelle barge en 2020 sur la rivière Saint-Augustin (in French), Radio-Canada
- Bourdon, Philippe; Ibrahim, Ghassen; Luce, Myriam; NantobBikatui, N'Binkéna; Othoniel, Clara; Tremblay, Yohann (April 2015), Portrait préliminaire de la zone de gestion intégrée de l'eau par bassin versant (PDF) (in French), OBV Duplessis, archived from the original (PDF) on 2019-09-02
- Hydrology of the Transboundary Rivers of Southern Labrador (PDF), Government of Newfoundland & Labrador, Department of Environment and Conservation, April 2013
- Liste des rivières à saumon (PDF) (in French), Quebec government, archived from the original (PDF) on 2018-12-28
- Municipalité de Saint-Augustin (Côte-Nord) (in French), Histoire du Québec
- Pourvoirie Kecarpoui (in French), Pourvoirie Kecarpoui
- Rivière Saint-Augustin (in French), Commission de toponymie du Québec
- Rivière Saint-Augustin (in French), Ressources naturelles Canada
- Saucier, J.-P.; Robitaille, A.; Grondin, P.; Bergeron, J.-F.; Gosselin, J. (2011), Les régions écologiques du Québec méridional (PDF) (map), 4 (in French), Ministère des Ressources naturelles et de la Faune, archived from the original (PDF) on 2020-06-19
- Traverse de la rivière Saint-Augustin (Basse-Côte-Nord) (in French), Gouvernement du Québec
