= Mecatina =

Mecatina pronounced (me-kuh-TEE-nuh) is an Innu word that means large mountain. It is also the name of two rivers (Big and Little), a school, and a municipality, on the Lower North Shore of the Gulf of Saint Lawrence of Quebec:

- Gros-Mécatina, Quebec
- Big Mecatina River
- Little Mecatina River
