= Coxipi River =

Coxipi River Rivière Coxipi
- Location within Quebec
- Native name: Kak Sipi (Innu)

Location
- Country: Canada
- Province: Quebec
- Region: Côte-Nord
- RCM: Le Golfe-du-Saint-Laurent

Physical characteristics
- Mouth: Gulf of Saint Lawrence
  - coordinates: 51.3044444°N 58.4808333°W
  - elevation: 0 metres (0 ft)
- Length: 128 kilometres (80 mi)
- Basin size: 1,672 square kilometres (646 sq mi)

The Coxipi River (French: Rivière Coxipi) is a salmon river in the Côte-Nord region of Quebec, Canada. It flows south through Quebec from Labrador and empties into the Gulf of Saint Lawrence.

== Location ==
The main channel of the river is about 128 kilometres (80 mi) long, of which 20 kilometres (12 mi) is in Labrador. The river has a Strahler number of 6. The headwaters of the river rise at about 405 metres (1,329 ft). The river drops by more than 240 metres (790 ft) in its first 30–40 kilometres (19–25 mi). It is fed by Lake Poincarré. The 11 square kilometres (4.2 sq mi) Lake Coxipi is long and narrow, essentially a widening of the Coxipi River. The mouth of the river is in the municipality of Saint-Augustin in Le Golfe-du-Saint-Laurent Regional County Municipality. It is about 15 kilometres (9.3 mi) from the village of Saint-Augustin.

== Name ==
The 1914 and 1925 editions of the Dictionnaire des rivières et lacs de la province de Québec call the river Léandre River. That name is said to come from a fisherman named Léandre who was based at its mouth for many years. The 1921 Noms géographiques de la province de Québec gives Léandre River as the official name, and refers Coxipi River to Léandre River. In 1948 the Quebec Geography Commission accepted Coxipi as the official name. The name "Coxipi" comes from the Innu language name Kak Sipi, which means "porcupine river". Some sources say that coxipi means "sorcerer".

== Description ==
The Dictionnaire des rivières et lacs de la province de Québec (1914) says of the Léandre River,

Situated on the north coast of the Saint Lawrence, Saguenay County, 14 miles from Shecatica Bay, in the canton of Bougainville. Its name comes from a fisherman called Léandre who exploited this river at its mouth for many years. The savages used to call it Coxipi. This watercourse, about 60 miles long, flows into the sea in a rapid one mile long. According to the surveyor H. Bellanger (1912) the river is excellent for floating wood. The land in the area is unsuitable for cultivation and lightly wooded. This river contains trout and salmon in abundance. It is also excellent hunting territory and is frequently visited by the savages. The river Léandre receives the waters of several beautiful lakes enclosed in mountains with a height of 100 or 200 feet. Its main tributaries are the Est River and the Petite River.

== Basin ==
The Coxipi River basin covers 1,672 square kilometres (646 sq mi). Of this 130 square kilometres (50 sq mi) is in Labrador. It lies between the basins of the Saint-Augustin River to the west and the Chécatica River to the east. The Quebec portion is partly in the unorganized territory of Petit-Mécatina and partly in the municipality of Saint-Augustin. The average elevation of the watershed in 249 metres (817 ft), rising to a maximum of 503 metres (1,650 ft). The river basin include part of the proposed Basses Collines du Lac Guernesé Biodiversity Reserve. This would protect the area from hydroelectric development.

== Environment ==
A map of the ecological regions of Quebec shows the Coxipi River in sub-regions 6o-T, 6n-T and 6m-T of the east spruce/moss subdomain. About 80.6% of the watershed is forest covered, with just 3.1% covered in shrubs or grassland. 9.6% of the watershed in water and 1.2% wetlands. Annual daily mean temperatures are 0–1.2 °C (32.0–34.2 °F), ranging from −16.5 to −12.8 °C (2.3 to 9.0 °F) in January to 13.9 to 15.2 °C (57.0 to 59.4 °F) in July. Average annual precipitation is 1,005.4 to 1,122.4 millimetres (39.58 to 44.19 in). Land mammals include black bear, moose, boreal woodland caribou, wolf, lynx, beaver, North American porcupine, mink, hare and red fox.

== Fishing ==
The Coxipi River is recognized as an Atlantic salmon river. There are several fishing holes in the rapids at the river mouth. The salmon mount the river for over 30 kilometres (19 mi). Brook trout are also common. The Pourvoirie Saint-Augustin, an outfitter accessible by boat or floatplane, provides fishing services over a 13 kilometres (8.1 mi) stretch. The Pourvoirie Kecarpoui arranges fishing/camping expeditions that include the Véco, Kécarpoui, Saint-Augustin, Coxipi, Chécatica and Napetipi rivers.

== Sources ==
- Bourdon, Philippe; Ibrahim, Ghassen; Luce, Myriam; NantobBikatui, N'Binkéna; Othoniel, Clara; Tremblay, Yohann (April 2015), Portrait préliminaire de la zone de gestion intégrée de l'eau par bassin versant (PDF) (in French), OBV Duplessis
- Bourque, Mylène; Provost, Virginie; Mazo, Gabriel (2009), Guide d'intervention en matiere de conservation et de mise en valeur des habitats littoraux d'interet en Basse-Cote-Nord (PDF) (in French), Comité ZIP Côte-Nord du Golfe
- Hydrology of the Transboundary Rivers of Southern Labrador (PDF), Government of Newfoundland & Labrador, Department of Environment and Conservation, April 2013
- Lac Coxipi (in French), Commission de toponymie du Québec
- Liste des rivières à saumon (PDF) (in French), Quebec government, archived from the original (PDF) on 2018-12-28
- Pourvoirie Kecarpoui (in French), Pourvoirie Kecarpoui
- Rivière Coxipi, Natural Resources Canada
- "Rivière Coxipi", Saumon Québec (in French)
- Rouillard, Eugène (1914), "Léandre, (Rivière)", Dictionnaire des rivières et lacs de la province de Québec (in French), Québec. Département des terres et forêts
- Saucier, J.-P.; Robitaille, A.; Grondin, P.; Bergeron, J.-F.; Gosselin, J. (2011), Les régions écologiques du Québec méridional (PDF) (map), 4 (in French), Ministère des Ressources naturelles et de la Faune, archived from the original (PDF) on 2020-06-19
