= Ha! Ha! River (Gros-Mécatina) =

River in Côte-Nord, Quebec. Canada

- Location within Quebec

Location
- Country: Canada
- Province: Quebec
- Region: Côte-Nord
- Regional County Municipality: Le Golfe-du-Saint-Laurent Regional County Municipality
- Municipality: Gros-Mécatina

Physical characteristics
- Source: Petit lac Plamondon
  - location: Côte-Nord-du-Golfe-du-Saint-Laurent
  - coordinates: 50.99894°N 59.062660°W
  - elevation: 61 m (200 ft)
- Mouth: Monger Lake
  - location: Gros-Mécatina
  - coordinates: 50.99805°N 59.04528°W
  - elevation: 3 m (9.8 ft)
- Length: 3.1 km (1.9 mi)
- Discharge
  - location: Gros-Mécatina

Basin features
- Tributaries
  - left: Décharge d'un petit lac non identifié

The Ha! Ha! River (from ha-ha, unexpected obstacle on a road) constitutes the outlet of the Plamondon Lake reservoir, flowing in the municipalities of Côte-Nord-du-Golfe-du-Saint-Laurent and Gros-Mécatina, in the Le Golfe-du-Saint-Laurent Regional County Municipality, in the administrative region of Côte-Nord, in Quebec, in Canada.

A carriage road connecting route 138 goes north from Saint Lawrence estuary shore to the dam at the head of the Ha! Ha! River. The economy of the sector is mainly dependent on hydroelectricity thanks to this dam.

The surface of the Ha! Ha! River is usually frozen from the beginning of November to the beginning of May, however the safe circulation on the ice is generally done from the end of November to the end of April.

== Toponymy ==
The term "Ha! Ha!" would not be a matter of onomatopoeia but rather a derivation of the term French ha-ha which means unexpected obstacle on a path.

In the province of Quebec, certain places also use this expression in their toponymy, in particular:

- another Ha! Ha! River in Saguenay–Lac-Saint-Jean
- the Baie des Ha! Ha!
- the Lake Ha! Ha!
- the Petit lac Ha! Ha!

== Geography ==
The main watersheds near the Ha! Ha! are:

- north side: Lac du Chevreuil, Baie des Ha! Ha!, Kécarpoui River, Kécarpui Lake;
- east side: Monger Lake, Véco River, Baie des Ha! Ha!, Saint Lawrence estuary;
- south side: Petit lac Plamondon;
- west side: Plamondon Lake (Gros-Mécatina), Robertson Lake.

The Ha! Ha! rises at the mouth of Petit lac Plamondon at an altitude of 61 km (38 mi). This source is located at:

- 1.2 km (0.75 mi) south-west of the mouth of the Ha! Ha! River;
- 17.7 km (11.0 mi) north-west of the village center of La Tabatière;
- 12.4 km (7.7 mi) north-west of the entrance to the Baie des Ha! Ha!.

=== River course ===
From the dam at the mouth of Petit lac Plamondon, the course of the Ha! Ha! River flows over 3.1 km (1.9 mi) according to the following segments:

- 1.8 km (1.1 mi) north to a bend in the river, corresponding to the outlet (coming from the north) from an unidentified lake;
- 1.3 km (0.81 mi) towards the south-east by crossing two series of rapids, up to Monger Lake.

The Ha! Ha! River pours into the bottom of a bay on the north shore of Monger Lake. This confluence is located at:

- 3.3 km (2.1 mi) west of the mouth of Monger Lake;
- 4.3 km (2.7 mi) south-west of the confluence of the Véco River and the Baie des Ha! Ha!;
- 12.0 km (7.5 mi) north-west of the entrance to the Baie des Ha! Ha!;
- 18.4 km (11.4 mi) north-west of the village center of La Tabatière.

From the confluence of the Ha! Ha! River, the current crosses Monger Lake on 4.5 km (2.8 mi) to the east, bypassing by the south a peninsula attached to the north shore; then the current follows on 2.3 km (1.4 mi) the course of the Véco River towards the northeast which constitutes a navigable strait; then crosses Baie des Ha! Ha! By bypassing the "Pointe de la Rivière" from the north, then heading for 11.6 km (7.2 mi) towards the south-east until Saint Lawrence estuary in passing between Fecteau Island and Cape High.

== See also ==
- Le Golfe-du-Saint-Laurent Regional County Municipality
- Gros-Mécatina, a municipality
- Monger Lake, a body of water
- Plamondon Lake (Gros-Mécatina), a body of water
- Petit lac Plamondon, a body of water
- Robertson Lake, a body of water
- Véco River, a stream
- Baie des Ha! Ha!
- Saint Lawrence estuary
- List of rivers of Quebec
