= Véco River =

River in Quebec

Véco River Rivière Véco
- Location within Quebec

Location
- Country: Canada
- Province: Quebec
- Region: Côte-Nord
- RCM: Le Golfe-du-Saint-Laurent

Physical characteristics
- Mouth: Gulf of Saint Lawrence
  - coordinates: 50.99805°N 58.98139°W
  - elevation: 0 metres (0 ft)
- Length: 80 kilometres (50 mi)
- Basin size: 1,016 square kilometres (392 sq mi)

The Véco River (French: Rivière Véco, pronounced [ʁivjɛʁ veko]) is a salmon river in the Côte-Nord region of Quebec, Canada, that empties into the Gulf of Saint Lawrence. It has been dammed to supply a hydroelectric power plant. The shoreline around the mouth of the river is protected as part of a federal bird sanctuary.

== Location ==
The Véco River is 80 kilometres (50 mi) long and its watershed covers 1,016 square kilometres (392 sq mi). (Note: OBV Duplessis gives the watershed area as 1,029 square kilometres (397 sq mi).) The river drains Lake Robertson Lake, Lake Charles and Lake Blais. It empties into Ha! Ha! Bay. The river flows through the unorganized territory of Petit-Mécatina. The mouth of the river is in the municipality of Gros-Mécatina in Le Golfe-du-Saint-Laurent Regional County Municipality.

== Name ==
The river is named after Jean-Baptiste Véco, a notary-royal, who exercised his profession in Acadia in the 17th century.

== Dam ==
A Hydro-Québec dam on the river created the Robertson Reservoir for the Lac-Robertson Generating Station, which includes the former Lake Robertson and Lake Plamondon. It contains rainbow smelt, arctic char, brook trout and landlocked salmon. The 22 MW power plant came into operation in 1995. The water quality was monitored from 1990 to 1997. The dam had the effect of increasing mercury content in the lake water. Degradation of organic matter in the flooded zone releases mercury, which is transformed into methyl mercury and enters the food chain. These changes may have affected the water quality of the Véco River and Ha! Ha! Bay.

== Conservation ==
The proposed Harrington Harbor Biodiversity Reserve would lie in the river's watershed. A bird sanctuary, the Gros-Mécatina Migratory Bird Sanctuary, covers Plate Island and Trois Collines Island as well as Marmette Islands and Rocks. It is fully protected and access is forbidden. It is owned by the Federal Ministry of Natural Resources and Wildlife and is subject to the Migratory Birds Convention Act, the Canada Wildlife Act and the Regulations on migratory bird sanctuaries. The tidal zone of the Gros Mécatina River and the Véco River are outside the jurisdiction of the Municipality of Gros-Mécatina and are managed by the bird sanctuary.

== Fishing ==
The Véco River is used as a spawning ground by Atlantic salmon (Salmo salar) and brook trout (Salvelinus fontinalis). Arctic char (Salvelinus alpinus) has been noted in Robertson Lake, and could be more widespread in the area. The mouth of the Véco River in Ha!Ha! Bay is home to rainbow smelt (Osmerus mordax), Atlantic tomcod (Microgadus tomcod) and American eel (Anguilla rostrata).

The Pourvoirie Kecarpoui arranges fishing/camping expeditions that include the Véco River and other nearby rivers (Kécarpoui, Saint-Augustin, Coxipi, Chécatica and Napetipi. In the period from 2012 to 2016 an average of four salmon were reported caught in the river each year. In 2017 all salmon, large and small, had to be released on the Malbaie (Gaspé Peninsula), Pigou, Bouleau, Magpie, Coacoachou, Nétagamiou, Little Mecatina and Véco rivers. Only young salmon could be retained on 51 rivers, and limited retention of large salmon was allowed on 19 rivers.

== Sources ==
- Bilan de l'exploitation du saumon au Québec en 2017 (PDF) (in French), ministère des Forêts, de la Faune et des Parcs, Secteur de la faune, 15 February 2018
- Centrales hydroélectriques (au 1er janvier 2019) (in French), Hydro-Québec
- Bourque, Mylène; Provost, Virginie; Mazo, Gabriel (October 2009), Guide D'intervention En Matiere De Conservation Et De Mise En Valeur Des Habitats Littoraux D'interet En Basse-cote-nord (PDF) (in French), Comité ZIP Côte-Nord du Golfe
- Fish Consumption Guide for Gros-Mécatina (PDF), Hydro-Québec
- Portrait préliminaire de la zone de gestion intégrée de l’eau par bassin versant Duplessis (PDF) (in French), OBV Duplessis, April 2015, archived from the original (PDF) on 2019-09-02
- Pourvoirie Kecarpoui (in French), Pourvoirie Kecarpoui
- Rivière Véco (in French), Commission de toponymie du Québec
- Rivière Véco (in French), Ressources naturelles Canada

== See also ==
- Le Golfe-du-Saint-Laurent Regional County Municipality
- Gros-Mécatina, a municipality
- Monger Lake, a waterbody
- Plamondon Lake (Gros-Mécatina), a waterbody
- Petit lac Plamondon, a waterbody
- Robertson Lake, a waterbody
- Baie des Ha! Ha!
- Saint Lawrence estuary
- List of rivers of Quebec
