= Saint-Paul River =

Saint-Paul River Rivière Saint-Paul
- Location within Quebec
- Native name: Aiahtshimeu Hipu (Innu)

Location
- Country: Canada
- Province: Quebec
- Region: Côte-Nord
- RCM: Le Golfe-du-Saint-Laurent

Physical characteristics
- Mouth: Gulf of Saint Lawrence
  - coordinates: 51.4694444°N 57.7013889°W
  - elevation: 0 metres (0 ft)
- Length: 246 km (153 mi)
- Basin size: 7,158 km^{2} (2,764 sq mi)

The Saint-Paul River (French: Rivière Saint-Paul, pronounced [ʁivjɛʁ sɛ̃ pɔl]) is a river on the Labrador Peninsula of eastern Canada. Its source is located in the province of Newfoundland and Labrador and it empties into the Gulf of Saint Lawrence in the Côte-Nord region of Quebec. The Saint-Paul River is a salmon river that flows in a southerly direction.

== Location ==
The river rises on the height of land between the Atlantic and Saint Lawrence. The main channel is about 246 kilometres (153 mi), of which about 146 kilometres (91 mi) is in Labrador. The river has a Strahler number of 7. It flows in a southerly direction, and empties into Esquimaux Bay in the Vieux Fort archipelago, about 35 kilometres (22 mi) west of the municipality of Blanc-Sablon. The last fifteen kilometers of its course define the boundary between the cantons of Chevalier and Bonne-Esperance. The mouth of the river is in the municipality of Bonne-Espérance in Le Golfe-du-Saint-Laurent Regional County Municipality. The village of Rivière-Saint-Paul is located on the west side of its mouth.

== Name ==
The Inuit who once lived at the river mouth called the river the Quitzezaqui River, meaning "Great River". The Naskapi call it Aisimeu Shipu, meaning "Eskimo River", while the Innu use Aiahtshimeu Hipu, also meaning "Eskimo River". Louis Jolliet arrived at the river on 7 July 1694, and called it Rivière des Esquimaux. It was also called Grande Rivière.

In March 1706 Jean-Amador Godefroy de Saint-Paul (1649-1730) was granted a trading concession at the river mouth. This post and a village that grew around it came to be called Village Saint-Paul. The community name Rivière-Saint-Paul was adapted officially in 1956.

== Basin ==
The river basin covers 7,158 square kilometres (2,764 sq mi). It lies between the basins of the Napetipi River to the west and the Belles Amours River to the east. About 69.5% of the basin is in Labrador, north of the provincial boundary. The Quebec portion is partly in the unorganized territory of Petit-Mécatina and partly in the municipality of Bonne-Espérance. The river basin include part of the proposed Basses Collines du Lac Guernesé Biodiversity Reserve. A map of the ecological regions of Quebec shows the river in sub-regions 6o-T, 6n-T and 6m-S of the east spruce/moss subdomain.

== Basque presence ==
Between July and August 2019 a team of underwater archaeologists discovered and examined four fishing sites on the Saint-Paul River that dated to the 16th century. The camps were full of objects such as cauldrons, ceramics, roofing tiles and ships nails that the Inuit probably bought from Basques. This showed that the Inuit were settled rather than nomadic, and also that the Basques had closer ties with the local people than had been thought. The objects were found in the river and on the shore.

== Fishing ==
The river is recognized as an Atlantic salmon (Salmo salar) river. In 2018 harvesting of large salmon was allowed for only part of the year. The fishing season lasts from mid-June to mid-August. In 2013–2017 an average of 126 salmon were reported caught each year in the river. The bed of the river is composed of medium-size rocks, and the water is cold and clear, making ideal habitat for Atlantic salmon. Other species found at the river mouth include American eel (Anguilla rostrata), anadromous brook trout (Salvelinus fontinalis) and rainbow smelt (Osmerus mordax).

The Club de pêche au saumon Saint-Paul (Saint-Paul Salmon Fishing Club) provides outfitting services. The club has exclusive rights in an area about 60 kilometres (37 mi) upstream with many islands and rapids. They provides a cabin, canoe, and guided fly fishing and river fishing for Atlantic Salmon. The camp is accessed via charter float plane or helicopter. Pourvoirie Green Point also provides outfitter services, and has exclusive rights for 17 kilometres (11 mi) of the river starting from 3 kilometres (1.9 mi) from the river mouth and extending to Green Point Rapids. The service includes air transport from Blanc-Sablon, guided fishing and accommodation in camps on the river.

The river exceeded its target for salmon management in 2018, and in July 2018 the Ministry of Forests, Wildlife and Parks announced that in August anglers could keep their catch of one large salmon 63 centimetres (25 in) or longer in the Gros Mécatina, Napetipi, Saint-Paul, Vieux Fort and Matapedia rivers.

== Sources ==
- Bilan de l’exploitation du saumon au Québec en 2018 (PDF) (in French), Ministère des Forêts, de la Faune et des Parcs, May 2019, archived from the original (PDF) on 2019-10-14
- Bourdon, Philippe; Ibrahim, Ghassen; Luce, Myriam; NantobBikatui, N'Binkéna; Othoniel, Clara; Tremblay, Yohann (April 2015), Portrait préliminaire de la zone de gestion intégrée de l'eau par bassin versant (PDF) (in French), OBV Duplessis, archived from the original (PDF) on 2019-09-02
- "Club de pêche au saumon Saint-Paul", Québec original (in French), Tourisme Québec
- Hydrology of the Transboundary Rivers of Southern Labrador (PDF), Government of Newfoundland & Labrador, Department of Environment and Conservation, April 2013
- Lessard, Louis (19 August 2019), Découverte de quatre sites basques qui redéfinissent la relation avec les Inuit (in French), Radio Canada
- Liste des rivières à saumon (PDF) (in French), Quebec government, archived from the original (PDF) on 2018-12-28
- Pourvoirie Green Point (in French), Pourvoirie Green Point
- Rétention des grands saumons dans certaines rivières du Québec dès le 1er août 2018 (in French), Ministère
- Rivière Saint-Paul (in French), Commission de toponymie du Québec
- Rivière-Saint-Paul (village) (in French), Commission de toponymie du Québec
- Rivière Saint-Paul (in French), Ressources naturelles Canada
- Rivière Saint-Paul (in French), Saumon Québec
- Saucier, J.-P.; Robitaille, A.; Grondin, P.; Bergeron, J.-F.; Gosselin, J. (2011), Les régions écologiques du Québec méridional (PDF) (map), 4 (in French), Ministère des Ressources naturelles et de la Faune, archived from the original (PDF) on 2020-06-19
