= Ha! Ha! River =

Ha! Ha! River may refer to:

- Ha! Ha! River (Gros-Mécatina), a watercourse flowing in Côte-Nord, Quebec, Canada
- Ha! Ha! River (Saguenay River), a watercourse flowing in Saguenay, Quebec, Canada

== See also ==
- Minnehaha
