= Gros-Mécatina Migratory Bird Sanctuary =

Protected area in Quebec, Canada

- Refuge d'oiseaux de Gros Mécatina
- IUCN category Ia (strict nature reserve)
- Location within Quebec
- Nearest city: Saint-Augustin, Côte-Nord, Quebec
- Coordinates: 50.75°N 58.75°W

The Gros-Mécatina Migratory Bird Sanctuary (French: Refuge d'oiseaux de Gros Mécatina) is a protected area in Quebec, Canada. It consists of four islands and a reef in the Gulf of Saint Lawrence that are used as nesting sites by seabirds.

== Location ==
The Gros Mécatina Bird Sanctuary is in the Gulf of Saint Lawrence offshore from the Cap du Gros Mecatina, the communities of Mutton Bay and La Tabatière, and the Baie des Ha! Ha!. The protected area includes four islands and a reef – the Île Plate, Île aux Trois Collines, the two Îles aux Marmettes and the Rochers aux Marmettes. The coastal waters within 1 kilometre (0.62 mi) of the islands and reef are also protected, covering an area of 2,168 hectares (5,360 acres) in total.

Part of the terrain is bare rock, and part is covered in flora such as cranberry (Vaccinium oxycoccos), cloudberry (Rubus chamaemorus), mosses and lichens. The tidal zones of the Gros Mécatina River and the Véco River are outside the jurisdiction of the Municipality of Gros-Mécatina and are managed by the bird sanctuary.

== Administration ==
The sanctuary was designated a Migratory Bird Sanctuary with IUCN Management Category "Ia" in 1996. The purpose is to protect the nesting sites of seabirds. It is fully protected and access is forbidden. It is owned by the Federal Ministry of Natural Resources and Wildlife and is subject to the Migratory Birds Convention Act, the Canada Wildlife Act and the Regulations on migratory bird sanctuaries.

== Birds ==
At one time the site was used for nesting by thousands of common murre (Uria aalge), but due to egg collecting and illegal hunting by 2010 there were only 12 of these birds in the sanctuary. Terns are sometimes the most common birds in the sanctuary, with 1,800 counted in 2005. Other birds that form colonies on the islands include Atlantic puffin (Fratercula arctica), black guillemot (Cepphus grylle), razorbill (Alca torda), American herring gull (Larus smithsonianus), great black-backed gull (Larus marinus), black-legged kittiwake (Rissa tridactyla), great cormorant (Phalacrocorax carbo) and double-crested cormorant (Phalacrocorax auritus).

== Sources ==
- Bourque, Mylène; Provost, Virginie; Mazo, Gabriel (October 2009), Guide D'intervention En Matiere De Conservation Et De Mise En Valeur Des Habitats Littoraux D'interet En Basse-cote-nord (PDF) (in French), Comité ZIP Côte-Nord du Golfe
- Gros Mécatina Bird Sanctuary, Natural Resources Canada
- Gros-Mécatina Migratory Bird Sanctuary, Canadian Wildlife Service
- Gros-Mécatina Migratory Bird Sanctuary in Canada, Protected Planet
