= Belles Amours River =

Belles Amours River Ruisseau des Belles Amours
- Location within Quebec

Location
- Country: Canada
- Province: Quebec
- Region: Côte-Nord
- RCM: Le Golfe-du-Saint-Laurent

Physical characteristics
- Mouth: Gulf of Saint Lawrence
  - coordinates: 51.4819444°N 57.4563889°W
  - elevation: 0 metres (0 ft)
- Basin size: 304 square kilometres (117 sq mi)

The Belles Amours River (French: Ruisseau des Belles Amours, pronounced [ʁɥiso de bɛlz‿amuʁ]) is a salmon river in the Côte-Nord region of Quebec, Canada. It empties into the Gulf of Saint Lawrence.

== Location ==
The mouth of the river is in the municipality of Bonne-Espérance in Le Golfe-du-Saint-Laurent Regional County Municipality. The Belles Amours harbor is an inlet that stretches inland for more than 2 kilometres (1.2 mi), and has provided a sheltered anchorage for fishermen since the 16th century.

== Name ==
The harbor was called "Beaulsanim" by the Basque captain Martin de Hoyarçabal in his Voyages Avantureux (1579). Some authors think this comes from the Basque word balza, meaning coast or place with several coasts. Others think it comes from the French word balsamine (balsam), a plant, or which several varieties grow wild in the region. Several early charts show variants of this word: Balsamon (1674), Balsanim (1689) and Balsamon (1694). The cartographer Jacques-Nicolas Bellin wrote "Belsamont or Belles Amours" on his maps of 1744 and 1755. The form "Belles Amours" prevailed from this date.

== Basin ==
The river basin covers 304 square kilometres (117 sq mi). It lies between the basins of the Saint-Paul River to the west and the Brador River to the east. It is partly in the unorganized territory of Petit-Mécatina and partly in the municipalities of Blanc-Sablon and Bonne-Espérance. The Brador Hills, so named by Admiral Henry Wolsey Bayfield on his 1843 map, stretch from east to west for about 40 kilometres (25 mi) between Belles Amours River and the Newfoundland border. The highest point is 366 metres (1,201 ft).

The river basin include part of the proposed Basses Collines du Lac Guernesé Biodiversity Reserve. A map of the ecological regions of Quebec shows the river in sub-regions 6o-T, 6n-T and 6m-T of the east spruce/moss subdomain. The river is recognized as an Atlantic salmon river. In 2013–2017 an average of 11 salmon were reported caught each year in the river.

== Sources ==
- Bilan de l’exploitation du saumon au Québec en 2018 (PDF) (in French), Ministère des Forêts, de la Faune et des Parcs, May 2019, archived from the original (PDF) on 2019-10-14
- Bourdon, Philippe; Ibrahim, Ghassen; Luce, Myriam; NantobBikatui, N'Binkéna; Othoniel, Clara; Tremblay, Yohann (April 2015), Portrait préliminaire de la zone de gestion intégrée de l'eau par bassin versant (PDF) (in French), OBV Duplessis, archived from the original (PDF) on 2019-09-02
- Havre des Belles Amours (in French), Commission de toponymie du Québec
- Liste des rivières à saumon (PDF) (in French), Quebec government, archived from the original (PDF) on 2018-12-28
- "Route bleue Natashquan/Blanc-Sablon", GrandQuebec.com (in French)
- Ruisseau des Belles Amours (in French), Ressources naturelles Canada
- Saucier, J.-P.; Robitaille, A.; Grondin, P.; Bergeron, J.-F.; Gosselin, J. (2011), Les régions écologiques du Québec méridional (PDF) (map), 4 (in French), Ministère des Ressources naturelles et de la Faune, archived from the original (PDF) on 2020-06-19
