= Baie des Ha! Ha! (Côte-Nord) =

Bay in Le Golfe-du-Saint-Laurent Regional County Municipality, Canada

- Location within Quebec
- Location: Gros-Mécatina, Quebec, Canada
- Coordinates: 50°59′15″N 58°56′15″W
- Type: Bay

The Baie des Ha! Ha! (English: Ha! Ha! Bay) is located in the municipality of Gros-Mécatina, in the Le Golfe-du-Saint-Laurent Regional County Municipality, on the north shore of Gulf of Saint Lawrence, in the administrative region of Côte-Nord in eastern Quebec, Canada.

== Geography ==
The Baie des Ha! Ha! is located on the north side of the village of La Tabatière and Baie-Rouge.

The entrance to the Baie des Ha! Ha! is bordered by the Red, Saint-Esprit, Ronde, Fecteau (largest) and Robertson Islets. Inside the bay, the main islands are: Jacobs and Woody. The Baie des Ha! Ha! is interconnected in its periphery with secondary and point bays (clockwise from the mouth of the bay): Fish Harbor, Pointe Seal, Terre Bay, Cap High, Anse Bastien, Anse Guillemette, Pointe du Sorcier, Pointe de la Rivière, Véco River, Baie Shoal, Baie Betty and Pointe Juniper (northeast shore).

The "Baie des Ha! Ha!" is mainly supplied by the Véco River which drains the waters of Robertson Lake, Charles Lake, and Blais Lake. The place called "Half Way Cabin" is located at the bottom of a bay facing Woody Island.

== Toponymy ==
The term Ha! Ha! does not come from the trivial onomatopoeia, but probably from an alteration of a Montagnais toponym almost unpronounceable in French which means in Algonquin place where bark is exchanged. Other linguists think of a possible derivation of the term French haha meaning "unexpected obstacle on a path".

The "Baie des Ha! Ha!" gave its name to the village of Baie-des-Ha! Ha!, which is now part of the municipality of Gros-Mécatina.

The term "Baie des Ha! Ha!" was formalized on December 5, 1968 at the Commission de toponymie du Québec.

== See also ==
- Baie des Ha! Ha! (Saguenay River), bay of the Saguenay River in the Saguenay–Lac-Saint-Jean region
