= Gros Mécatina River =

Gros Mécatina River Rivière du Gros Mécatina
- Location within Quebec

Location
- Country: Canada
- Province: Quebec
- Region: Côte-Nord
- RCM: Le Golfe-du-Saint-Laurent

Physical characteristics
- Source: Lac Boucher
  - coordinates: 51.109670°N 59.450554°W
- Mouth: Gulf of Saint Lawrence
  - coordinates: 50.7683333°N 59.0944444°W
- Length: 55 kilometres (34 mi)
- Basin size: 1,054 square kilometres (407 sq mi)

The Gros Mécatina River (French: Rivière du Gros Mécatina) is a salmon river in the Côte-Nord region of Quebec, Canada. It empties into the Gulf of Saint Lawrence.

== Location ==
The Gros Mécatina River is about 55 kilometres (34 mi) long, and originates in Lac Boucher 15 kilometres (9.3 mi) east of the Little Mecatina River and north-west of Robertson Lake. It has a winding course and passes through many lakes. The river flows in a generally southeast direction and empties into the Gulf of St. Lawrence near the Gros Mécatina Archipelago, west of the Baie des Moutons and the village of Mutton Bay. The hills just inland from Mutton Bay are almost 270 metres (890 ft) high. The mouth of the Gros Mécatina River is in the municipality of Gros-Mécatina in Le Golfe-du-Saint-Laurent Regional County Municipality. The Gros Mécatina Archipelago is in the Gulf to the southeast of the point at the river's mouth.

The river basin includes parts of the unorganized territory Petit-Mécatina and the municipalities of Côte-Nord-du-Golfe-du-Saint-Laurent and Gros-Mécatina. The basin covers 1,054 square kilometres (407 sq mi). Lac du Gros Mecatina is not far upstream from the river's mouth. Other lakes in the watershed include Lac Bernadette, Lac Talbot, Lac Boucher, Lac Garin, Lac Doris, Lac Arabian, Lac Levêque and Lac Grenville.

== Name ==
The name "Mécatina" comes from the Innu language makatinau, meaning "big mountain". In 1694 Louis Jolliet used the term Mecatinachis for the island of Petit Mécatina. The qualifiers Petit and Gros (Small and Big) were used to distinguish two nearby trading posts in the 18th century. On 20 September 1739 Jean-Baptiste Pommereau was granted a concession for the Gros Mécatinat, and on 15 January 1740 the intendant Gilles Hocquart granted Henri-Albert de Saint-Vincent seven or eight leagues of shoreline at Petit Mecatina. The names of the rivers that led inland from these trading posts were translated as the Big Mecatina River and Little Mecatina River by the English.

== Conservation ==
The proposed Harrington Harbor Biodiversity Reserve would lie in the river's watershed. A bird sanctuary, the Gros-Mécatina Migratory Bird Sanctuary, covers Plate Island and Trois Collines Island as well as Marmette Islands and Rocks. It is fully protected and access is forbidden. It is owned by the Federal Ministry of Natural Resources and Wildlife and is subject to the Migratory Birds Convention Act, the Canada Wildlife Act and the Regulations on migratory bird sanctuaries. The tidal zones of the Gros Mécatina River and the Véco River are outside the jurisdiction of the Municipality of Gros-Mécatina and are managed by the bird sanctuary.

== Fishing ==
Commercial fishing began on the Gros Mécatina River in 1749, when the river was known for the number and quality of its brook trout (Salvelinus fontinalis) and Atlantic salmon (Salmo salar). The salmon go up the river to a large waterfall about 20 kilometres (12 mi) from its mouth. In this section, the Pourvoirie Mécatina has the exclusive fishing rights. There are about 20 pools where fish can be caught between July and September while wading on rocks without sand. Between 2012 and 2016 an average of 90 juvenile salmon and 4 large salmon were reported caught each year. In 2017 harvesting of large salmon on the river was allowed in the second part of the season. The river exceeded its target for salmon management in 2018, and in July 2018 the Ministry of Forests, Wildlife and Parks announced that in August anglers could keep their catch of one large salmon 63 centimetres (25 in) or longer in the Gros Mécatina, Napetipi, Saint-Paul, Vieux Fort and Matapedia rivers.

== Sources ==
- Archipel du Gros Mécatina (in French), Commission de toponymie du Québec
- Bilan de l'exploitation du saumon au Québec en 2017 (PDF) (in French), ministère des Forêts, de la Faune et des Parcs, Secteur de la faune, 15 February 2018
- Bourque, Mylène; Provost, Virginie; Mazo, Gabriel (October 2009), Guide D'intervention En Matiere De Conservation Et De Mise En Valeur Des Habitats Littoraux D'interet En Basse-cote-nord (PDF) (in French), Comité ZIP Côte-Nord du Golfe
- Lac du Gros Mécatina (map) (in French), Commission de toponymie du Québec
- Portrait préliminaire de la zone de gestion intégrée de l’eau par bassin versant Duplessis (PDF) (in French), OBV Duplessis, April 2015
- Rétention des grands saumons dans certaines rivières du Québec dès le 1er août 2018 (in French), Ministère
- Rivière du Gros Mécatina, Natural Resources Canada
- "Rivière du Gros Mécatina", Saumon Québec (in French)
- Rivière du Petit Mécatina (in French), Commission de toponymie du Québec
