= Lac-Robertson Generating Station =

Hydroelectric power station in Quebec

Lac-Robertson Dam
- Location within Quebec
- Official name: Barrage du Lac-Robertson
- Country: Canada
- Location: Petit-Mécatina, Le Golfe-du-Saint-Laurent, Quebec
- Coordinates: 50.99885°N 59.062386°W
- Construction began: 1994
- Owner: Hydro-Québec

Dam and spillways
- Type of dam: Concrete-gravity
- Impounds: Véco River
- Height (foundation): 42 metres (138 ft)

Reservoir
- Creates: Robertson Reservoir
- Total capacity: 605,000,000 cubic metres (2.14×10^{10} cu ft)
- Catchment area: 1,300 square kilometres (500 sq mi)

Lac-Robertson Generating Station
- Coordinates: 50.999188°N 59.061909°W
- Operator: Hydro-Québec
- Commission date: 1995
- Hydraulic head: 38.5 metres (126 ft)
- Turbines: 2 x Kaplan
- Installed capacity: 22 MW

The Lac-Robertson Generating Station is a 21.6 MW hydroelectric power station in east of the Côte-Nord region of Quebec, Canada. It supplies power to the local communities, and is not connected to the main grid.

== Location ==
The Lac-Robertson Generating Station is in the unorganized territory of Petit-Mécatina in Le Golfe-du-Saint-Laurent Regional County Municipality. The dam crosses the northeast end of the Petit lac Plamodon where it drains into the Véco River upstream from the north end of Lac Monger. The Lac-Robertson powerhouse is in the base of the dam. The spillway releases water from the southeast bank of the Petit lac Plamodon into the small Lac Soulier, which drains via Lac Cuillère into the west end of Lac Monger. From Lac Monger the Veco River flows a short distance into the Baie des Ha! Ha!.

== Dam ==
The Hydro-Québec dam on the Véco River created the Robertson Reservoir for the Lac-Robertson Generating Station. The reservoir contains the former Lake Robertson and Lake Plamondon. The Lac-Robertson Dam was built in 1994. It It is a concrete-gravity dam on a treated rock foundation, and is 42 metres (138 ft) high. It has a holding capacity of 605,000,000 cubic metres (2.14×10^{10} cu ft). The watershed area is 1,300 square kilometres (500 sq mi).

== Power plant ==
The Lac-Robertson hydraulic generating station has a capacity of 21.6 MW. It is not connected to the main power grid in Quebec. It is connected to the isolated diesel customers in the Labrador Straits region, supplying power to them when a surplus is available. The facility has two turbines. The hydraulic head is 38.5 metres (126 ft). The plant was commissioned in 1995.

== Fish ==
The reservoir contains rainbow smelt, arctic char, brook trout and landlocked salmon. The water quality was monitored from 1990 to 1997. The dam had the effect of increasing mercury content in the lake water. Degradation of organic matter in the flooded zone releases mercury, which is transformed into methyl mercury and enters the food chain. These changes may have affected the water quality of the Véco River and Ha! Ha! Bay.

== Sources ==
- Bourque, Mylène; Provost, Virginie; Mazo, Gabriel (October 2009), Guide D'intervention En Matiere De Conservation Et De Mise En Valeur Des Habitats Littoraux D'interet En Basse-cote-nord (PDF) (in French), Comité ZIP Côte-Nord du Golfe
- Centrale du Lac-Robertson, Natural Resources Canada
- Centrales hydroélectriques (au 1er janvier 2019) (in French), Hydro-Québec
- Energy transition and innovation, Hydro-Québec
- Fish Consumption Guide for Gros-Mécatina (PDF), Hydro-Québec
- Lac-Robertson, Barrage du, Ministère de l'Environnement et de la Lutte contre les changements climatiques
- Request for Proposals: Review of the Newfoundland and Labrador Electricity System (PDF), Department of Natural Resources, 7 April 2014, archived from the original (PDF) on 2019-09-30
