= Chécatica River =

Chécatica River Rivière Chécatica
- Location within Quebec
- Native name: Netshikatikau Hipis (Innu)

Location
- Country: Canada
- Province: Quebec
- Region: Côte-Nord
- RCM: Le Golfe-du-Saint-Laurent

Physical characteristics
- Mouth: Gulf of Saint Lawrence
  - coordinates: 51.3869444°N 58.2797222°W
  - elevation: 0 metres (0 ft)
- Length: 30 kilometres (19 mi)
- Basin size: 193 square kilometres (75 sq mi)

The Chécatica River (French: Rivière Chécatica) is a salmon river in the Côte-Nord region of Quebec, Canada. It empties into the Gulf of Saint Lawrence.

== Location ==
The Chécatica River is about 30 kilometres (19 mi) long, and runs from north to south. In some sections it widens into lakes, including Lake Chécatica. It enters Jacques-Cartier Bay on the Saint Lawrence about 80 kilometres (50 mi) west of Blanc-Sablon. The bay is a waterbody with an irregular outline, containing many points, inlets and islands. Chécatica Island is at the entrance to the bay. Along the coast to the west, near one of the inlets, there is a small hamlet named Shekatika. The mouth of the Chécatica River is in the municipality of Saint-Augustin in Le Golfe-du-Saint-Laurent Regional County Municipality.

== Name ==
The Innu call the river Netshikatikau Hipis or Netsheskatakau Shipis. According to Father Georges Lemoine the name comes from shikatikau and means there are bushes beside the water. Variants include Ouescatacou and Ouescatacouau. On his first voyage in 1534 Jacques Cartier went by shallop to Chécatica, which he called Port de Jacques-Cartier. He found indigenous people in quite large numbers.

Cartier himself did not comment on the number of people he encountered saying only:

"There are people on this coast whose bodies are fairly well formed but they are wild and savage folk. They wear their hair tied up on the top of their heads like a handful of twisted hay, with a nail or something of the sort passed through the middle, and into it they weave a few bird’s feathers. They clothe themselves with the furs of animals, both men as well as women; but the women are wrapped up more closely and snuggly in their furs; and have a belt about their waists. They [all] paint themselves with certain tan colours. They have canoes made of birchbark in which they go about, and from which they catch many seals. Since seeing them [the Indians], I have been informed that their home is not at this place but that they come from warmer countries to catch these seals and to get other food for their sustenance."

== Basin ==
The river basin covers 193 square kilometres (75 sq mi). It lies between the basins of the Coxipi River to the west and the Napetipi River to the east. It is partly in the unorganized territory of Petit-Mécatina and partly in the municipality of Saint-Augustin.

A map of the ecological regions of Quebec shows the river in sub-regions 6o-T, 6n-T and 6m-T of the east spruce/moss subdomain. In 2002 the northern part of the river, to the east of Lake Tooker, was in territory that was seriously affected by hemlock looper moths (Lambdina fiscellaria). The river is recognized as an Atlantic salmon river. There are also brook trout in the river.

== Sources ==
- The voyages of Jacques Cartier : published from the originals with translations, notes and appendices, Ottawa : F.A. Acland, Printer to the King, 1924
- Aires infestées par l'arpenteuse de la pruche, au Québec, en 2002 (in French), Ministère des Ressources naturelles, de la Faune et des Parcs, 30 March 2005
- Annales de la propagation de la foi pour la province de Québec, Oeuvre de la propagation de la foi, 1886
- Bourdon, Philippe; Ibrahim, Ghassen; Luce, Myriam; NantobBikatui, N'Binkéna; Othoniel, Clara; Tremblay, Yohann (April 2015), Portrait préliminaire de la zone de gestion intégrée de l'eau par bassin versant (PDF) (in French), OBV Duplessis
- Bourque, Mylène; Provost, Virginie; Mazo, Gabriel (2009), Guide d'intervention en matiere de conservation et de mise en valeur des habitats littoraux d'interet en Basse-Cote-Nord (PDF) (in French), Comité ZIP Côte-Nord du Golfe
- Liste des rivières à saumon (PDF) (in French), Quebec government, archived from the original (PDF) on 2018-12-28
- Rivière Chécatica (in French), Commission de toponymie du Québec
- Rivière Chécatica (in French), Ressources naturelles Canada
- Saucier, J.-P.; Robitaille, A.; Grondin, P.; Bergeron, J.-F.; Gosselin, J. (2011), Les régions écologiques du Québec méridional (PDF) (map), 4 (in French), Ministère des Ressources naturelles et de la Faune, archived from the original (PDF) on 2020-06-19
