= Napetipi River =

Napetipi River Rivière Napetipi
- Location within Quebec
- Native name: Napetipiu Hipu (Innu)

Location
- Country: Canada
- Province: Quebec
- Region: Côte-Nord
- RCM: Le Golfe-du-Saint-Laurent

Physical characteristics
- Mouth: Gulf of Saint Lawrence
  - coordinates: 51.3386111°N 58.1311111°W
  - elevation: 0 metres (0 ft)
- Length: 121 kilometres (75 mi)
- Basin size: 1,262 square kilometres (487 sq mi)

The Napetipi River (French: Rivière Napetipi) is a salmon river in the Côte-Nord region of Quebec, Canada. It empties into the Gulf of Saint Lawrence.

== Location ==
The Napetipi River is 121 kilometres (75 mi) long, of which about 13 kilometres (8.1 mi) or 10.7% is in Labrador. The river's Strahler number is 5. The main channel's headwaters are at an elevation of about 390 metres (1,280 ft). It falls steeply in the upper sections, by nearly 320 metres (1,050 ft) in the first 40 kilometres (25 mi), then becomes flatter and in the last 80 kilometres (50 mi) drops by only 60 metres (200 ft) or so. Along most of its length it flows between high rocky shores. It widens along its length to form Lake Jamyn (or Napetipiu Nipi) and Lake Napetipi about 12 kilometres (7.5 mi) from its mouth.

The mouth of the river is in the municipality of Saint-Augustin in Le Golfe-du-Saint-Laurent Regional County Municipality. The mouth is about 35 kilometres (22 mi) from the village of Saint-Augustin. The river empties into the narrow Napetipi Bay which reaches inland for about 7 kilometres (4.3 mi) between high rocky shores. It provides little shelter from southerly winds.

== Name ==
The name Napetipi is Innu in origin and means "river of man". Some authors suggest the Saint-Jacques River, mentioned by Jacques Cartier during his first voyage in 1534, was the Napetipi River and bay. In his 1890 report on the Napetipi River, surveyor Henry Robertson mentions that "there are many seals in Napetipi Lake".

== Description ==
The Dictionnaire des rivières et lacs de la province de Québec (1914) says,

Situated in Canadian Labrador, between the Saint Augustin River and the Eskimo River. It starts in a lake and discharges into the sea through a rapids. It is an excellent watercourse for trout and salmon. The surrounding region, according to the surveyor H.H. Robertson (1980) is almost sterile. At several places on the shore there is wood, but of small size. Jacques Cartier named the river Fleuve Saint-Jacques and caught many salmon here during his first voyage.

== Basin ==
The Napetipi River basin covers 1,262 square kilometres (487 sq mi). It lies between the basins of the Chécatica River to the west and the Saint-Paul River to the east. About 60 square kilometres (23 sq mi) or 4.7% of the watershed is in Labrador. The average elevation of the watershed is 233 metres (764 ft), rising to over 300 metres (980 ft) in the north, with the highest point at 502 metres (1,647 ft). The Quebec portion is partly in the unorganized territory of Petit-Mécatina and partly in the municipalities of Saint-Augustin and Bonne-Espérance.

== Environment ==
A map of the ecological regions of Quebec shows the Napetipi River in sub-regions 6o-T, 6n-T and 6m-T of the east spruce/moss subdomain. 85.4% of the watershed is forested, and 3.5% has other forms of dry land vegetation. 8.3% is water covered, and 1.2% is wetlands. Annual daily mean temperature is 1.1 to 1.2 °C (34.0 to 34.2 °F), ranging from −13.4 to −12.8 °C (7.9 to 9.0 °F) in January to 13.9 to 14.1 °C (57.0 to 57.4 °F) in July. Annual precipitation is 1,098.4 to 1,122.4 millimetres (43.24 to 44.19 in). The river basin include part of the proposed Basses Collines du Lac Guernesé Biodiversity Reserve. The biodiversity reserve would protect that part of the river from hydroelectric development. The basin is home to mammals such as black bear, moose, wolf, American mink and red fox.

== Fishing ==
The Napetipi River is recognized as an Atlantic salmon river. The waters are cool, and salmon are unusually energetic. Other fish are anadromous brook trout and brown trout. The Napetipi River Outfiters has exclusive rights, located on the shore of Lake Pareme, north-west of Lake Napetipi. They recommend the release of all catches. The river had exceeded its target for salmon management, and in July 2018 the Ministry of Forests, Wildlife and Parks announced that in August anglers could keep their catch of one large salmon 63 centimetres (25 in) or longer in the Gros Mécatina, Napetipi, Saint-Paul, Vieux Fort and Matapedia rivers.

== Sources ==
- Bourdon, Philippe; Ibrahim, Ghassen; Luce, Myriam; NantobBikatui, N'Binkéna; Othoniel, Clara; Tremblay, Yohann (April 2015), Portrait préliminaire de la zone de gestion intégrée de l'eau par bassin versant (PDF) (in French), OBV Duplessis, archived from the original (PDF) on 2019-09-02
- Bourque, Mylène; Provost, Virginie; Mazo, Gabriel (2009), Guide d'intervention en matiere de conservation et de mise en valeur des habitats littoraux d'interet en Basse-Cote-Nord (PDF) (in French), Comité ZIP Côte-Nord du Golfe
- Hydrology of the Transboundary Rivers of Southern Labrador (PDF), Government of Newfoundland & Labrador, Department of Environment and Conservation, April 2013
- Liste des rivières à saumon (PDF) (in French), Quebec government, archived from the original (PDF) on 2018-12-28
- Rétention des grands saumons dans certaines rivières du Québec dès le 1er août 2018 (in French), Ministère
- Rivière Napetipi (in French), Commission de toponymie du Québec
- Rivière Napetipi (in French), Ressources naturelles Canada
- Rivière Napetipi (in French), Saumon Québec
- Rouillard, Eugène (1914), "Napetipi, (Rivière)", Dictionnaire des rivières et lacs de la province de Québec (in French), Québec. Département des terres et forêts
- Saucier, J.-P.; Robitaille, A.; Grondin, P.; Bergeron, J.-F.; Gosselin, J. (2011), Les régions écologiques du Québec méridional (PDF) (map), 4 (in French), Ministère des Ressources naturelles et de la Faune, archived from the original (PDF) on 2020-06-19
