= Gros-Mécatina =

- Municipality
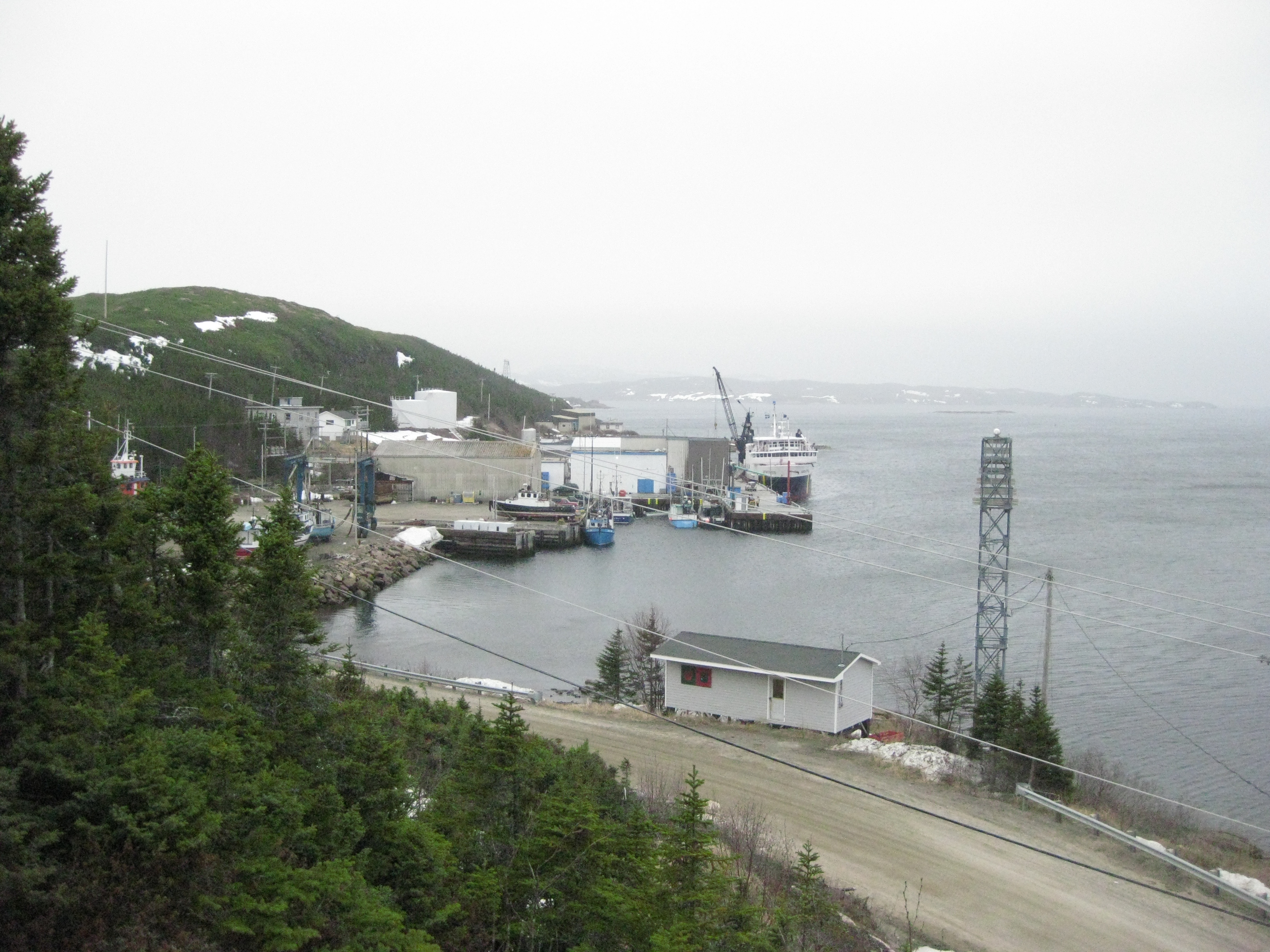
- Harbour in La Tabatière
- Motto: Forward Together
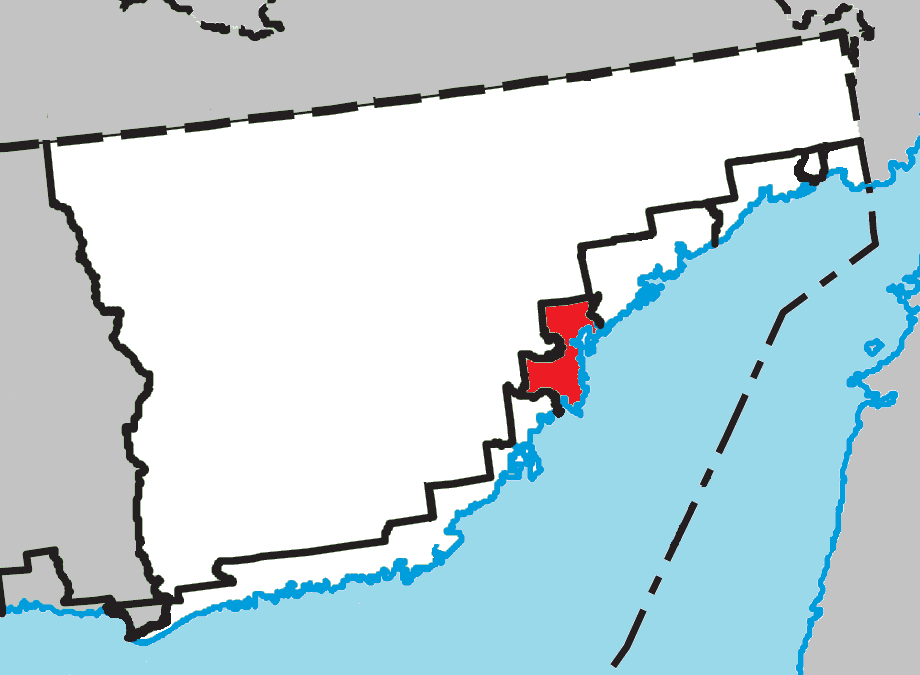
- Location within Le Golfe-du-Saint-Laurent RCM

- Location in Côte-Nord Region of Quebec
- Coordinates: 50°50′N 58°58′W
- Country: Canada
- Province: Quebec
- Region: Côte-Nord
- RCM: Le Golfe-du-Saint-Laurent
- Constituted: January 1, 1994

Government
  - Mayor: Gena Chubbs
  - Federal riding: Côte-Nord—Kawawachikamach—Nitassinan
  - Prov. riding: Duplessis

Area
  - Total: 1,407.00 km^{2} (543.25 sq mi)
  - Land: 742.15 km^{2} (286.55 sq mi)
- Highest elevation: 59 m (194 ft)
- Lowest elevation: 0 m (0 ft)

Population (2021)
  - Total: 356
  - Density: 0.5/km^{2} (1.3/sq mi)
  - Pop 2016-2021: ▼21.1%
  - Dwellings: 243
- Time zone: UTC-4 (AST)
- Postal code(s): G0G 1T0
- Area codes: 418 and 581
- Highways: No major routes
- GNBC Code: EPSNX
- NTS Map: 012J15
- Website: www.grosmecatina.ca

Gros-Mécatina (French pronunciation: [ɡʁo mekatina]) is a municipality on the Lower North Shore of the Gulf of Saint Lawrence, near the border with Labrador in Quebec, Canada. Located near crab, lobster, and scallop fishing grounds, it is dependent on the fishing business, including a fish processing factory that contributes to regional economic activity.

The isolated municipality can only be reached via a regular weekly ferry service, or La Tabatière Airport. The villages of La Tabatière and Mutton Bay are connected via a 10 kilometres (6.2 mi) asphalted road that has views of the gulf from the mountains, but in the winter the road is not plowed, and the only access is via snowmobile.

The name, pronounced (me-kuh-TEE-nuh) is from the Innu word makatinau, or "It is a large mountain."

== History ==
Exploration of the area began in 1535 when Jacques Cartier passed by during his second voyage. The place became an important hunting and fishing ground in the first part of the 18th century. From 1739, Jean-Baptiste Pommereau acquired the fishing rights of the region for a period of ten years. The Gros-Mécatina Post, built in the same time period near present-day La Tabatière, quickly became one of the most important fishing settlements of the North Shore. Big Mécatina Island also, granted to Intendant Gilles Hocquart in 1755, was a popular location with fishermen. They remained such until at least 1808 when the authorities of Quebec sold Gros-Mécatina. By then permanent settlement had begun.

The Municipality of Gros-Mécatina was formed on January 1, 1994, when its territory was separated from the Municipality of Côte-Nord-du-Golfe-du-Saint-Laurent. It was named after several geographic features within its area called Gros Mécatina, including a river, cape, island, archipelago, and lake. Mecatina comes from the Innu word makatinau, meaning "large mountain."

== Communities ==
The municipality consists of two small isolated fishing villages, La Tabatière and Mutton Bay, as well as the abandoned settlements of Lac-Salé and Baie-des-Ha!-Ha! (Baie de la Terre).

=== La Tabatière ===
La Tabatière (50°49′45″N 58°57′38″W) is located on La Tabatière Bay, opposite Big Mecatina Island (île du Gros Mécatina), and home to a fish processing plant and reservoirs to supply vessels that serve this part of the region. According to popular opinion, the origin of its name (French for "the snuff box") refers to the loss of a tobacco pouch by a missionary. However, it is a corruption of tabaquen, possibly Innu, which became tapatienne and then tabatière. Missionary correspondence shows that the parish was at one time often referred to as Saint-Joseph-de-Tabaquen, a name said to mean "sorcery," and a priest who visited the mission in 1887 wrote that aboriginal groups who came to trade would consult a "sorcerer-magician" before leaving for their camps in the interior forests to find out the prospects for their return trip.

La Tabatière has long been frequented by fishermen and traders, particularly attractive for fishing cod and seals. In 1820, Scotsman Samuel Robertson, former employee of the Gros-Mécatina Post, settled there and founded a permanent settlement that his descendants still occupy today. In 1855, he was joined by settlers from Jersey and the place became known by the English name Sparr Point. In 1885, the Catholic mission Saint-Joseph-de-la-Tabatière was established and La Tabatière post office began operations on November 1, 1907. In the 1930s, the seal oil rendering and fish oil factory burned down and was rebuilt as a fish-processing plant which today is the largest on the Coast.

=== Mutton Bay ===
Mutton Bay (in French: Baie-des-Moutons 50°46′19″N 59°01′45″W) is a small isolated fishing village on the namesake bay, just east of the mouth of the Big Mecatina River. The meaning of its name remains obscure since it seems unlikely that there ever were any sheep present. The name may be used as a metaphor for the white foam of waves, or for the hills that surround the bay, which are all rounded at the top.

In 1804, notary Félix Têtu reported the establishment of the Baie-Moutons trading post. In the middle of the 19th century, the bay was being fished but the village was not really established until 1872 when Newfoundlanders arrived and settled there. By 1886, the local post office opened, first identified as Saint-Joseph-de-la-Tabatière, then from 1896 on as Mutton Bay. In 1983, the place name was officially anglicized to Mutton Bay, replacing Baie-des-Moutons, because of the majority of English-speaking residents. By 1988, Mutton Bay had 55 families, living mainly from fishing lobster and scallops.

== Demographics ==
Canada census – Gros-Mécatina community profile

	2021	2016	2011
Population	356 (-21.1% from 2016)	451 (−9.6% from 2011)	499 (-11.8% from 2006)
Land area	742.15 km^{2} (286.55 sq mi)	790.07 km^{2} (305.05 sq mi)	804.80 km^{2} (310.74 sq mi)
Population density	0.5/km^{2} (1.3/sq mi)	0.6/km^{2} (1.6/sq mi)	0.6/km^{2} (1.6/sq mi)
Median age	55.6 (M: 56.0, F: 55.2)	53.1 (M: 53.9, F: 52.2)	47.1 (M: 47.9, F: 46.0)
Private dwellings	243 (total) 182 (occupied)	269 (total)	270 (total)
Median household income	$58,000	$54,528	$.N/A

Notes: 2011 income data for this area has been suppressed for data quality or confidentiality reasons.
References: 2021 2016 2011

Historical Census Data - Gros-Mécatina, Quebec

Year	Pop.	±%
1991	674	—
1996	622	−7.7%
2001	573	−7.9%
2006	566	−1.2%

Year	Pop.	±%
2011	499	−11.8%
2016	451	−9.6%
2021	356	−21.1%

2016 count amended
Source: Statistics Canada

=== Language ===
Canada Census Mother Tongue - Gros-Mécatina, Quebec
Census	Total	French			English			French & English			Other		
Year	Responses	Count	Trend	Pop %	Count	Trend	Pop %	Count	Trend	Pop %	Count	Trend	Pop %
2021	355	10	▼50.0%	2.8%	340	▼16.0%	95.8%	5	▲ n/a	1.4%	0	▼100.0%	0.0%
2016	425	20	▼20.0%	4.7%	405	▼13.8%	95.3%	0	0.0%	0.0%	5	▲ n/a	1.2%
2011	495	25	0.0%	5.1%	470	▼13.0%	95.0%	0	▼100.0%	0.0%	0	0.0%	0.0%
2006	575	25	▼28.6%	4.4%	540	▲3.7%	93.9%	10	▼50.0%	1.7%	0	0.0%	0.0%
2001	575	35	▲14.3%	6.1%	520	▼11.1%	90.4%	20	▲50.0%	3.5%	0	0.0%	0.0%
1996	625	30	n/a	4.8%	585	n/a	93.6%	10	n/a	1.6%	0	n/a	0.0%

== Local government ==
List of former mayors:

- Brian Evans (...–2005)
- Randy Jones (2005–2021)
- Gena Chubbs (2022–present)

== Education ==
Commission scolaire du Littoral operates St-Lawrence School (anglophone) in Mutton Bay.

== See also ==
- Ha! Ha! River
- List of anglophone communities in Quebec
- List of municipalities in Quebec
