= Ecological regions of Quebec =

Bioclimatic domains of Quebec Ministry of Forests, Wildlife and Parks: 1. Maple / bitternut hickory; 2O. Maple / basswood - West 2E. Maple / basswood - East 3O. Maple / yellow birch - West 3E. Maple / yellow birch - East 4O. Fir / yellow birch - West 4E. Fir / yellow birch - East 5O. Fir / white birch - West 5E. Fir / white birch - East 6O. Spruce / moss - West 6E. Spruce / moss - East: 7. Spruce / lichen; 8. Tundra forest; 9. Tundra arctic shrubs; 10. Tundra arctic herbaceous

The Ecological regions of Quebec are regions with specific types of vegetation and climates as defined by the Quebec Ministry of Forests, Wildlife and Parks. Given the size of this huge province, there is wide variation from the temperate deciduous forests of the southwest to the arctic tundra of the extreme north.

== Vegetation zones ==
Quebec covers more than 1,600,000,000 square kilometres (620,000,000 sq mi) of land between 45° and 62° north, with vegetation that varies greatly from south to north. Most of the natural vegetation is forest, with various species of trees and other plants, and these forests are the habitat for diverse fauna. Energy, precipitation and soil are all important factors in determining what can grow. The climate influences the natural disturbances that affect forests: western Quebec has a drier climate than the east, and experiences more fires. For most species these disturbances are not disasters, and some need them to regenerate.

The climate in Quebec supports rich deciduous forest in the southern regions, and further north become progressively harsher. In the Saint Lawrence Lowlands there are graduations of climate from southwest to northeast. Changes in elevation can have similar effects to changes in latitude, with plants adapted to cooler conditions found higher up. Within a given bioclimatic domain the types of vegetation depend on soil, terrain features such as hilltops, slopes and valley floors, and disturbances such as fires, insect infestations and logging.

The Quebec Ministry of Forests, Wildlife and Parks divides Quebec into three vegetation zones: northern temperate, boreal and Arctic, which correspond to Quebec's major climate subdivisions, and divides these into sub-zones, which in turn are divided into domains and sub-domains. The ministry publishes a map in which these sub-domains are in turn divided into ecological regions and subregions, and then into landscape units. (See Saucier, J.-P.; Robitaille, A.; Grondin, P.; Bergeron, J.-F.; Gosselin, J. 1998)

== Geology ==
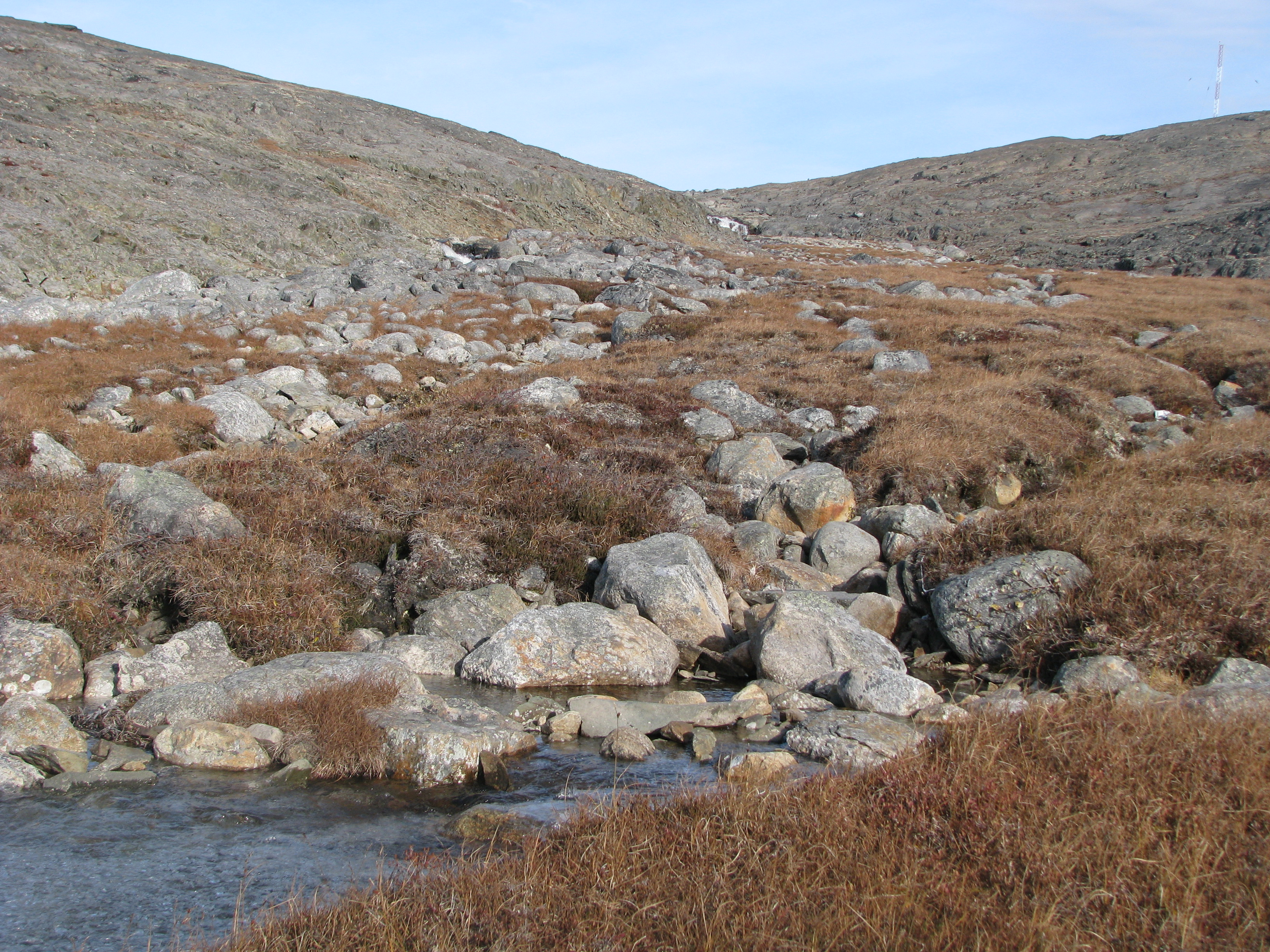
Rock valley, Kangirsuk, Nunavik

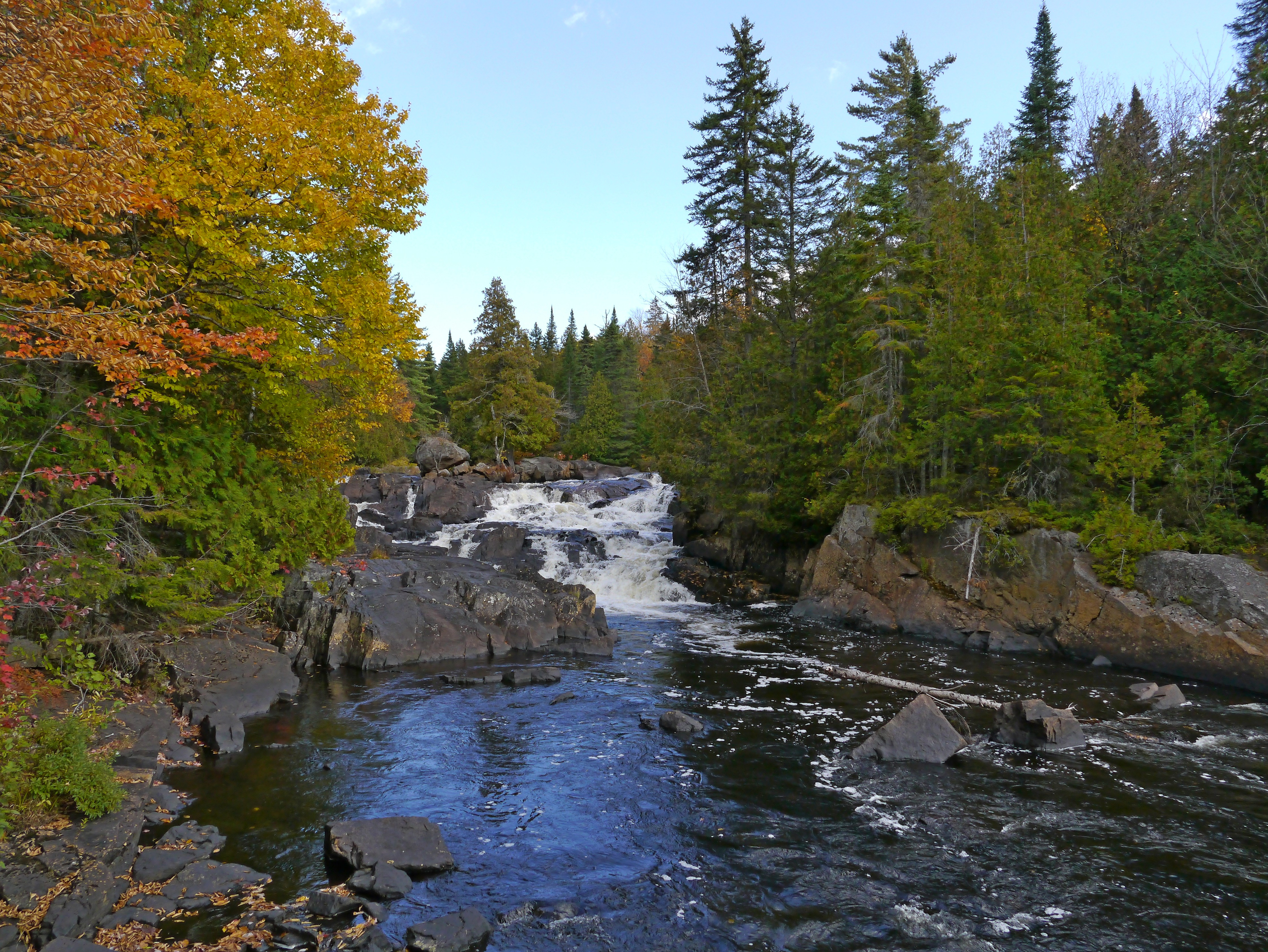
Falls on Mont-Tremblant, Laurentian Mountains

All of the bedrock of Quebec north of the foothills of the Laurentian Mountains is the Canadian Shield, one of the oldest and most stable of geological formations in the world, with rocks from 600 million to 4 billion years old. The rocks are hard and mostly acidic. The second largest geological zone is the Appalachians, about 230 million years old, softer and less acidic than the shield. The most fertile part of Quebec is on the rocks of the Saint Lawrence Lowlands, which are at least 250 million years old. They are sedimentary, once the beds of ancient seas.

Most of the rock is covered with surface deposits from a few centimeters or inches thick to over 60 metres (200 ft). All forests grow on deposits at least 50 centimetres (20 in) thick. The roots penetrate the deposits and draw water and nutrients from them. All these surface deposits in Quebec date to the last glacial period in North America, when ice completely covered Quebec to a depth of 1 kilometre (0.62 mi) or more. The Laurentide Ice Sheet began to melt in the south about 15,000 years ago, and steadily retreated north, exposing rocks, sand and silt that had been scraped from the rock when the glaciers had moved south. These loose deposits, or glacial till, are the most abundant type of surface deposit in Quebec. The till has often been reworked by the rivers that carried away the water of the melting ice sheet, or by the ancient lakes or seas that flooded inland before the land rebounded from the weight of the ice cap.

The tills drain well due to their stones and abundant sand, but their richness in nutrients depends on their origins. The soil derived from the Shield is mostly acidic, lacking in nutrients such as calcium, stony and with fine particles that are mostly sand. Most of Quebec's coniferous boreal forest grows on the Canadian Shield. The Appalachians form less acidic and more fertile soils, still rocky, but with less sand and more silt. In the Eastern Townships the forests are mostly deciduous, but the forests of the Bas-Saint-Laurent and the Gaspé Peninsula are mostly conifers. Although the soils of the Saint Lawrence Lowlands are very stony they are also very rich in nutrients.

== Bioclimatic domains ==
The Committee on the Map of Ecological Regions of the Quebec Ministry of Forests, Wildlife and Parks defined the current classification of bioclimatic domains in Quebec in 1998. These are regions with similar climate and vegetation. There are ten of these domains. Some of the domains are subdivided into west and east sub-domains due to differences in vegetation caused by differences in precipitation. The domains are:

Zone	Sub-zone	Domain	Area	
Zone	Sub-zone	Domain	km^{2}	sq. mile
Northern temperate	Deciduous forest	1. Maple / bitternut hickory	14,500	5,600
Northern temperate	Deciduous forest	2. Maple / basswood (west and east)	31,000	12,000
Northern temperate	Deciduous forest	3. Maple / yellow birch (west and east)	65,600	25,300
Northern temperate	Mixed forest	4. Fir / yellow birch (west and east)	98,600	38,100
Boreal	Continuous boreal forest	5. Fir / white birch (west and east)	139,000	54,000
Boreal	Continuous boreal forest	6. Spruce / moss (west and east)	412,400	159,200
Boreal	Taiga	7. Spruce / lichen	299,900	115,800
Boreal	Tundra	8. Tundra forest	217,100	83,800
Arctic	Low Arctic	9. Tundra arctic shrubs	197,800	76,400
Arctic	Low Arctic	10. Tundra arctic herbaceous	38,200	14,700

== Northern temperate zone ==
The northern temperate zone has two sub-zones: deciduous forest and mixed forest.

=== Deciduous forest sub-zone ===
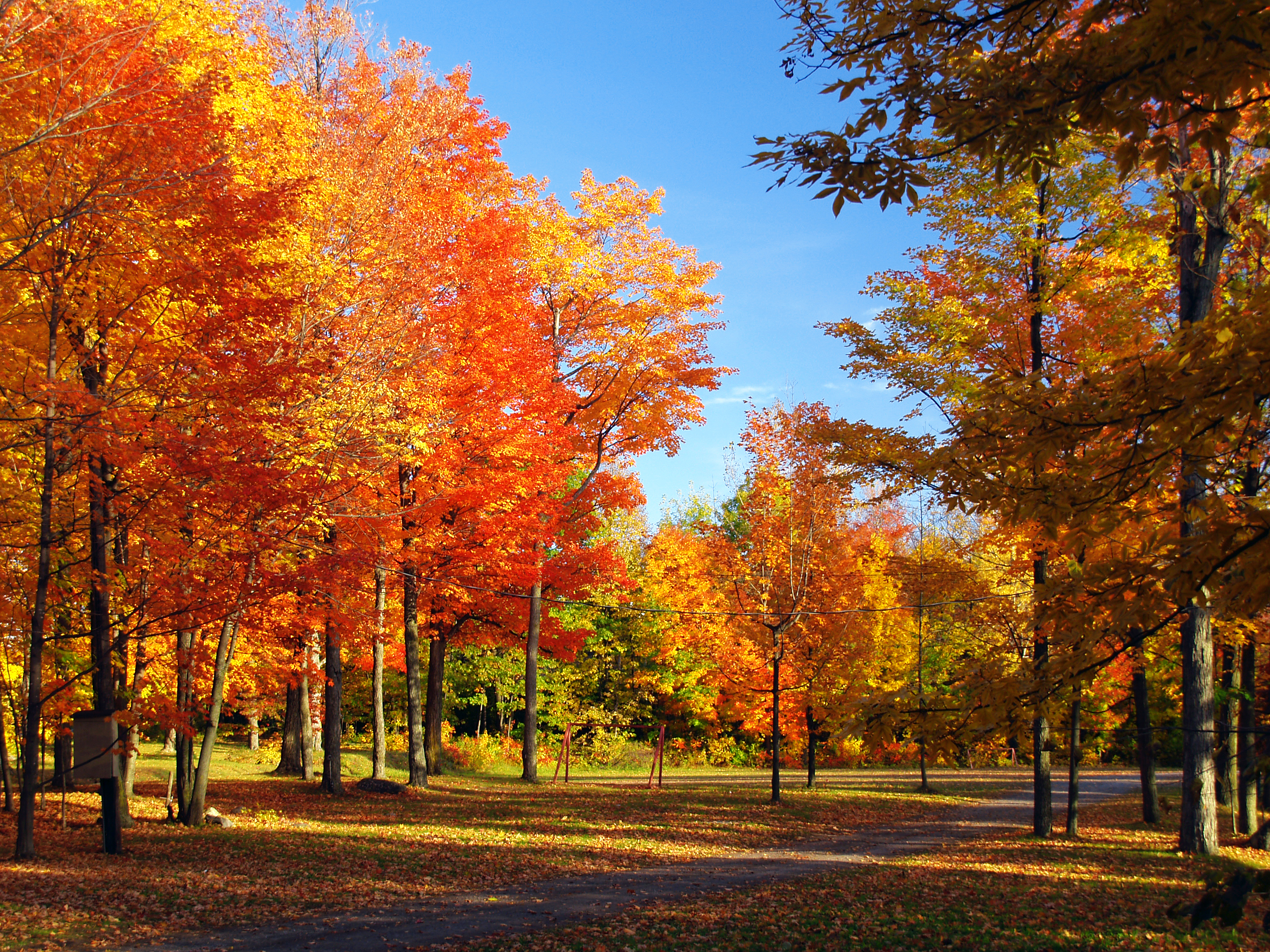
Maples near Mont-Saint-Grégoire (Maple/bitternut hickory domain)

The deciduous forest sub-zone contains northern hardwood forests and is dominated by maples (Acer). Windthrow is an important element of the forest dynamics. It includes the maple / bitternut hickory domain, the maple / basswood domain and the maple / yellow birch domain.

The maple / bitternut hickory domain has the mildest climate in Quebec and has very diverse forests. It includes several warm climate species, some at the northern limit of their range such as bitternut hickory (Carya cordiformis), shagbark hickory (Carya ovata), hackberries (Celtis), black maple (Acer nigrum), swamp white oak (Quercus bicolor), rock elm (Ulmus thomasii), pitch pine (Pinus rigida) and several shrubs and herbaceous plants. Other species such as sugar maple (Acer saccharum), fir and spruce also grow further north.

The maple / basswood domain extends north and east of the Maple / bitternut hickory domain, and also has very diverse flora. As well as sugar maple the American basswood (Tilia americana), white ash (Fraxinus americana), American hophornbeam (Ostrya virginiana) and butternut (Juglans cinerea) are found in favorable locations, but are less common beyond this area. The western subdomain is drier than the eastern subdomain, and the northern red oak (Quercus rubra) is more common in the east.

The maple / yellow birch domain covers the slopes and hills that border the southern Laurentian plateau and the Appalachians, and is the most northern domain of the deciduous forest sub-zone. The flora are less diverse and include many boreal species. On representative sites the yellow birch (Betula alleghaniensis) is one of the main companions to the sugar maple. American Basswood, American hophornbeam. American beech (Fagus grandifolia), northern red oak and eastern hemlock (Tsuga canadensis) grow in this area, but are very rare beyond its northern limit. The domain is divided into east and west sub-domains based on rainfall and the distribution of eastern white pine (Pinus strobus) and red pine (Pinus resinosa).

=== Mixed forest sub-zone ===
The mixed forest sub-zone has one domain, the fir / yellow birch domain. It is slightly less rich in species than the deciduous forest sub-zone. It contains southern species such as yellow birch (Betula alleghaniensis) and boreal species such as balsam fir (Abies balsamea) and black spruce (Picea mariana). This domain is an ecotone, or transition from the northern temperate zone to the boreal zone. It extends from the west to the center of Quebec between latitudes 47° and 48°. It also surrounds the Gaspé Peninsula and encompasses the Appalachian hills east of Quebec, the Laurentian foothills north of the Saint Lawrence, and the Lac Saint-Jean lowlands.

The sugar maple is at the northern limit of its range here. Typical sites have mixed stands of yellow birch and conifers such as balsam fir, white spruce (Picea glauca) and cedar. Fires and outbreaks of spruce budworm are the main types of forest disturbance.

== Boreal zone ==
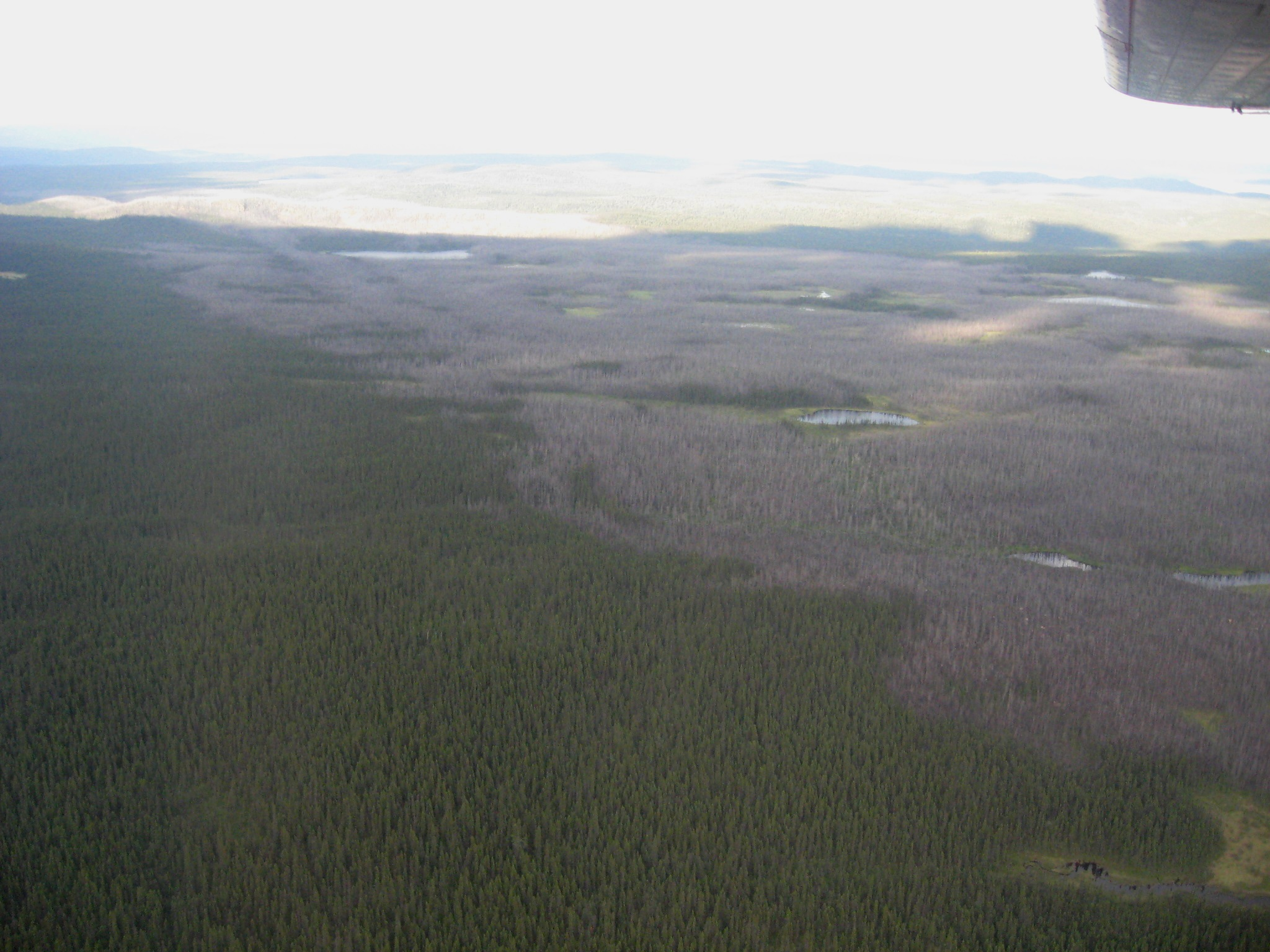
Traces of forest fire, René-Levasseur Island, Manicouagan (spruce/moss domain, east)

The boreal zone has three sub-zones: boreal forest, taiga and tundra forest.

=== Continuous boreal forest sub-zone ===
The boreal forest sub-zone has fairly dense stands that mostly contain boreal softwood species and light-leaved deciduous trees. It includes the fir / white birch domain and the spruce / moss domain.

The fir / white birch domain covers the southern part of the boreal zone. The forests are dominated by stands of fir and white spruce, often mixed with white birch. Yellow birch and red maple (Acer rubrum) are found only in the south of the domain. In more marginal areas black spruce (Picea mariana), jack pine (Pinus banksiana) and tamarack (Larix laricina) often grow beside paper birch (Betula papyrifera) and trembling aspen (Populus tremuloides). Spruce budworm is the main type of forest disturbance, attacking the balsam fir. Fire is also a significant factor. The western part of the domain is drier and has more frequent fires, resulting in more stands of species such as trembling aspen, white birch and jack pine.

The spruce / moss domain extends to around 52° north. The forest is dominated by black spruce, which is often the only species of tree, but is often accompanied by species such as balsam fir. Hardwoods such as white birch, trembling aspen and sometimes balsam poplar also grow in this area. The ground is covered with hypnaceous mosses and ericaceous shrubs. There are few herbaceous species. Fires are the main factor in forest dynamics, and occur more frequently in the west, which has fewer fir trees than the east.

=== Taiga sub-zone ===
The taiga sub-zone contains one domain, the spruce-lichen domain, and extends from the 52° to 55° north. It differs from the spruce-moss forest mainly by the more sparse forest cover. Black spruce, which is adapted to the harsh climate with low precipitation, grows in a carpet of lichens. Balsam fir and jack pine are found at the northern limit of their range. Fires can destroy huge areas in this domain.

=== Tundra sub-zone ===
The tundra sub-zone contain one domain, the forest tundra domain. It is the ecotone between the boreal zone and the Arctic zone, and extends roughly from 55° to 58° north. Shrubby heathland with shrubs and lichens has patches of forest in sheltered sites, mainly stunted black spruce less than 3 metres (10 ft) high. There are some areas of permafrost.

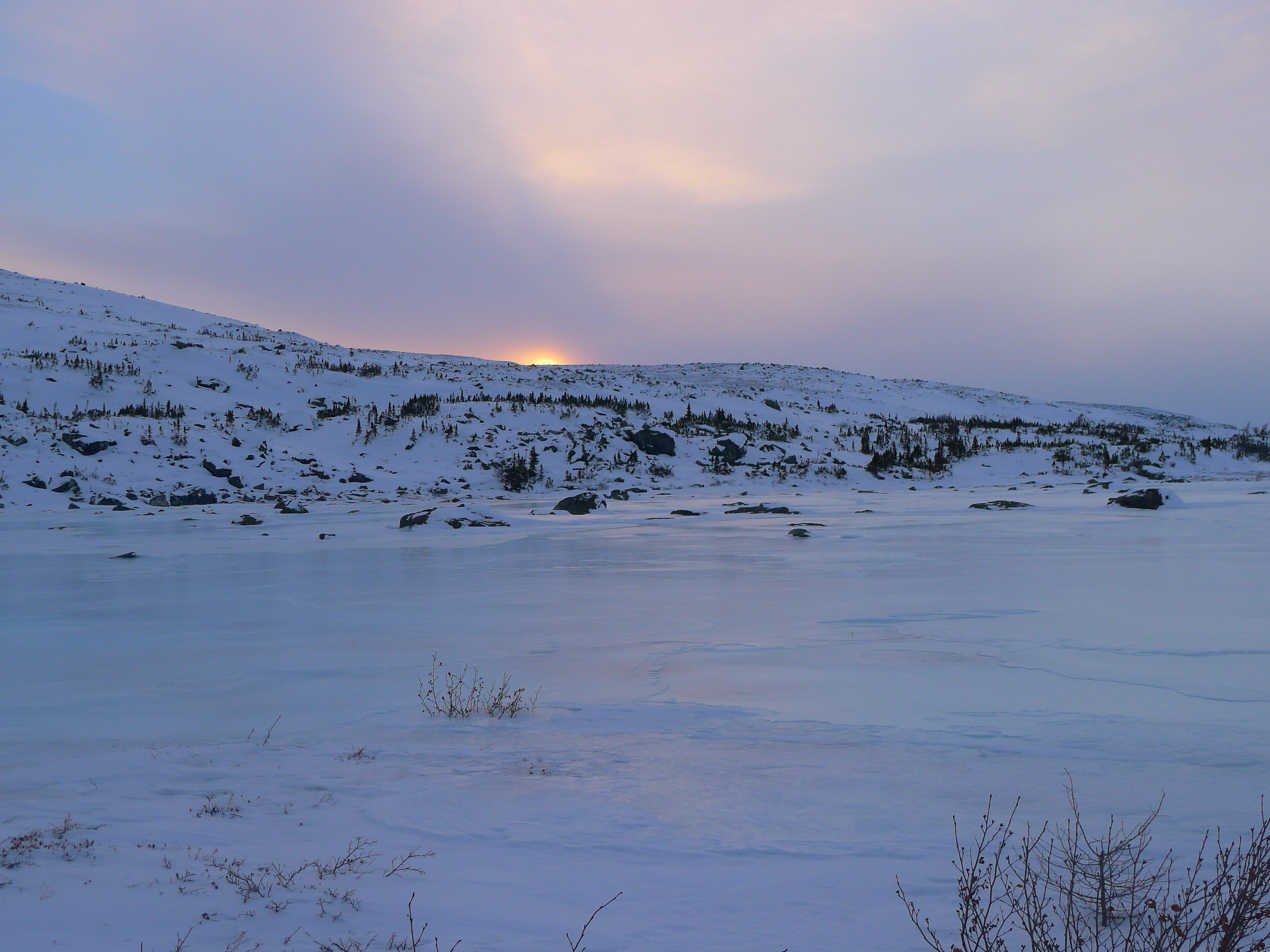
Sunset at Kangiqsualujjuaq (tundra arctic shrubs domain)

== Arctic zone ==
The tree line, beyond which black spruce, white spruce and tamarack no longer grow, is the boundary between the boreal zone and the Arctic zone. The Low Arctic sub-zone, the only Arctic sub-zone in Quebec, has no trees, continuous permafrost and tundra vegetation. This includes shrubs, herbaceous plants, typically graminoids, mosses and lichens. It includes the tundra arctic shrubs domain and the tundra arctic herbaceous domain.

The tundra arctic shrubs domain extends roughly from 58° to 61° north and has continuous permafrost and landscapes shaped by periglaciation. Dwarf willows and birches no more than 2 metres (6 ft 7 in) high grow beside herbaceous plants, mostly graminoids, mosses and lichens. Patches of vegetation similar to this domain can be found on high peaks of southern Quebec on the Gaspé Peninsula and Monts Groulx. The tundra arctic herbaceous domain is the northernmost domain in Quebec, and is completely covered in permafrost. Shrubs are rare and small. Cyperaceae, grasses, mosses and lichens are found, and rock and mineral soil is often bare.

=== See also ===
Bouleau River, Côte-Nord region, Minganie RCM, north shore of Gulf of St. Lawrence

== Sources ==
- Saucier, J.-P.; Robitaille, A.; Grondin, P.; Bergeron, J.-F.; Gosselin, J. (2011), The ecological regions of southern Quebec: one of the elements of the hierarchical system of ecological classification of the territory developed by the Ministry of Natural Resources (PDF). (map), 4 (in French) Ministry of Natural Resources and Wildlife, p 8 of 13, 1998 (Download full texte PDF)
- Gagnon, Daniel (May 2004), La forêt naturelle du Québec, un survol (in French), Commission d’étude sur la gestion de la forêt publique québécoise
- Zones de végétation et domaines bioclimatiques du Québec (in French), Gouvernement du Québec
