= Naosap Mud Lake =

Lake in Manitoba, Canada

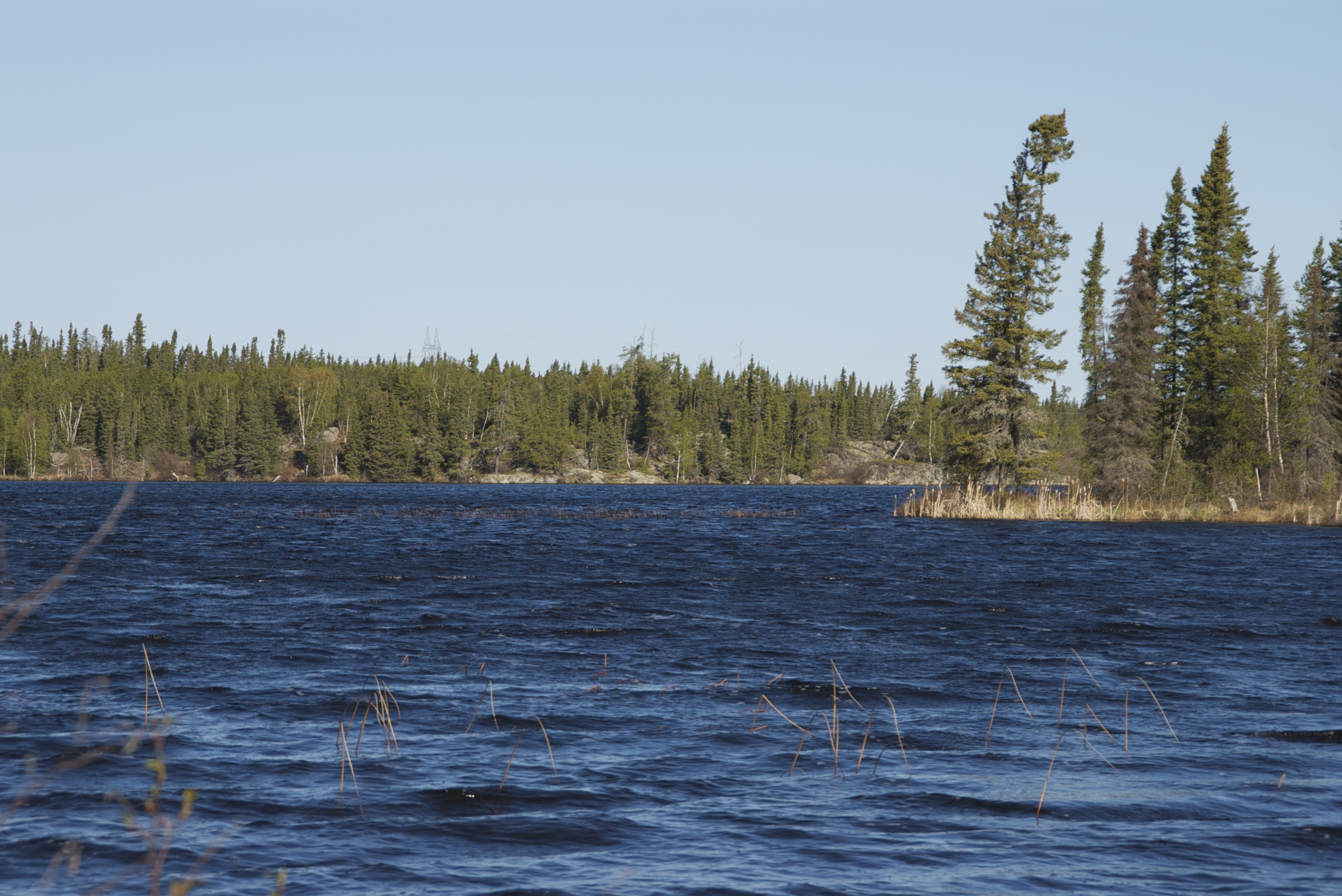
- Naosap Mud Lake

- Location of the lake in Manitoba Naosap Mud Lake (Canada)
- Location: Manitoba
- Coordinates: 54°50′57″N 101°29′33″W
- Lake type: Glacial Lake
- Primary inflows: None
- Primary outflows: Naosap Lake
- Basin countries: Canada
- Max. length: 1.4 km (0.87 mi)
- Max. width: .7 km (0.43 mi)
- Shore length^{1}: 4.7 km (2.9 mi)
- Surface elevation: 332 m (1,089 ft)
- Islands: 0
- Settlements: None
- ^{1} Shore length is not a well-defined measure.

Naosap Mud Lake is a small glacial lake approximately 22 kilometres (14 mi) northeast of Bakers Narrows which drains into Naosap Lake. It is part of the Nelson River watershed, in the Hudson Bay drainage basin in the Northern Region of Manitoba, Canada.

The name was officially adopted in 1979; Naosap is a Cree word meaning 'fourteen'.

== Description ==
The lakes sits in Churchill River Upland portion of the Midwestern Canadian Shield forests and is surrounded by mixed forest with stands of black spruce, white spruce, jack pine, and trembling aspen. The shoreline is poorly drained areas of muskeg.

== Canoe route ==
Nasoap Mud Lake is part of the "Mistik Creek Loop", a well-known remote canoe trip which is 95 km (59 mi) in total length and can be paddled in four days. The route begins and ends at Bakers Narrows and from Naosap Mud Lake there are portages east to Naosap Lake and south to Alberts Lake.

== See also ==
- List of lakes of Manitoba
