= Tapukok Lake =

Lake in Manitoba, Canada

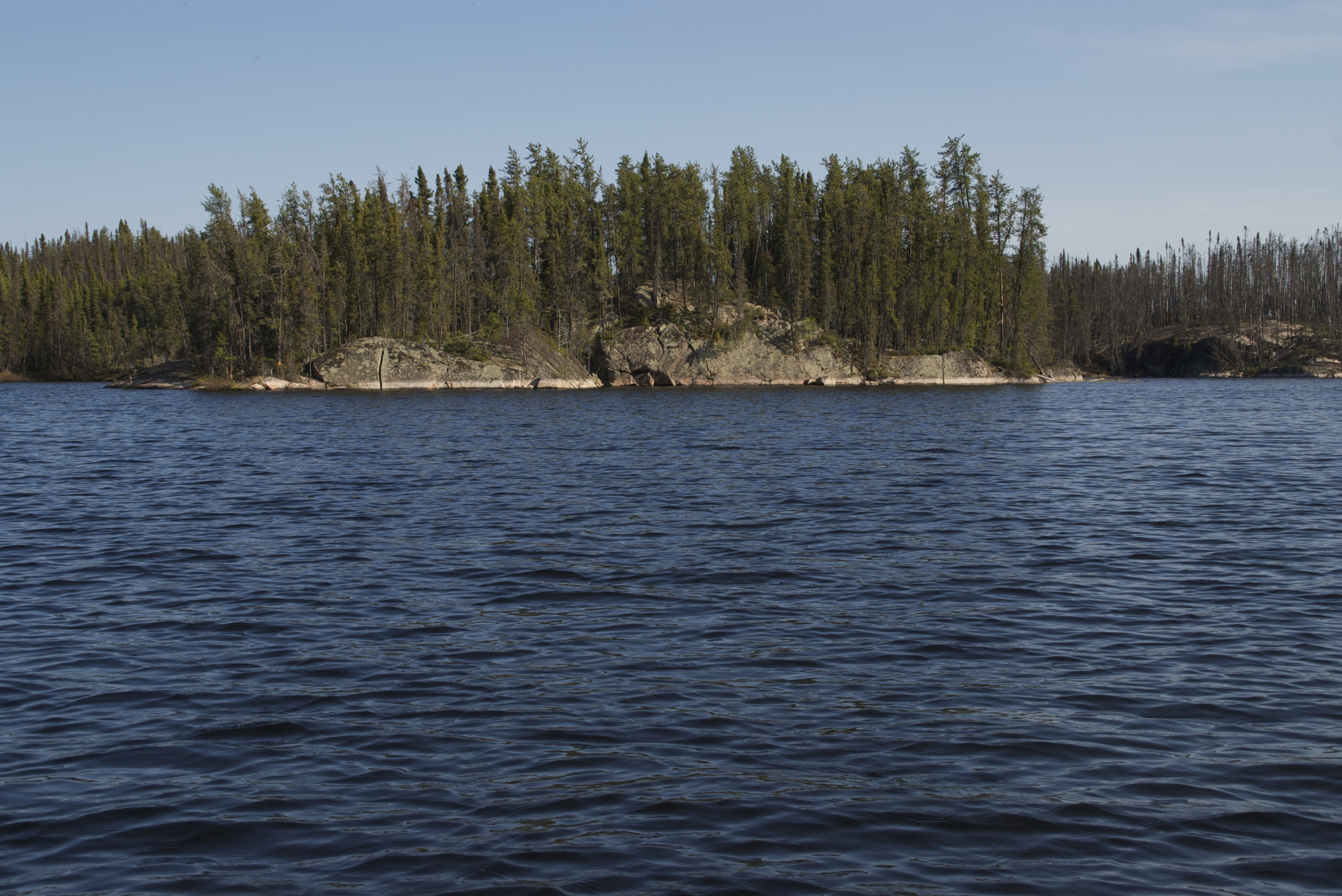

- Location of the lake in Manitoba Tapukok Lake (Canada)
- Location: Manitoba
- Coordinates: 54°45′11″N 101°22′57″W
- Lake type: Glacial Lake
- Primary inflows: Mistik Creek
- Primary outflows: Mistik Creek
- Basin countries: Canada
- Max. length: 1.7 km (1.1 mi)
- Max. width: .7 km (0.43 mi)
- Surface elevation: 319 m (1,047 ft)
- Islands: 8

Tapukok Lake is narrow glacial lake on the Mistik Creek chain above the Vamp Creek confluence. It is approximately 19 kilometres (12 mi) northeast of Bakers Narrows and is situated in the Hudson Bay drainage basin in the Northern Region of Manitoba, Canada. It is surrounded by the Churchill River Upland portion of the Midwestern Canadian Shield forests which consist of mixed deciduous and coniferous trees.

The area around the lake consists of rocky parallel ridges with poorly drained areas of muskeg and irregular stony shorelines due to intense glaciation. The lake is situated on the well known "Mistik Creek Loop", a remote canoe route 80 kilometres (50 mi) in length which can be paddled in four days.

Tapukok means 'seven' in Cree, as all of the fourteen lakes on Mistik Creek are named in numeric order in Cree.

== See also ==
- List of lakes of Manitoba
