= Payukosap Lake =

Lake in Manitoba, Canada

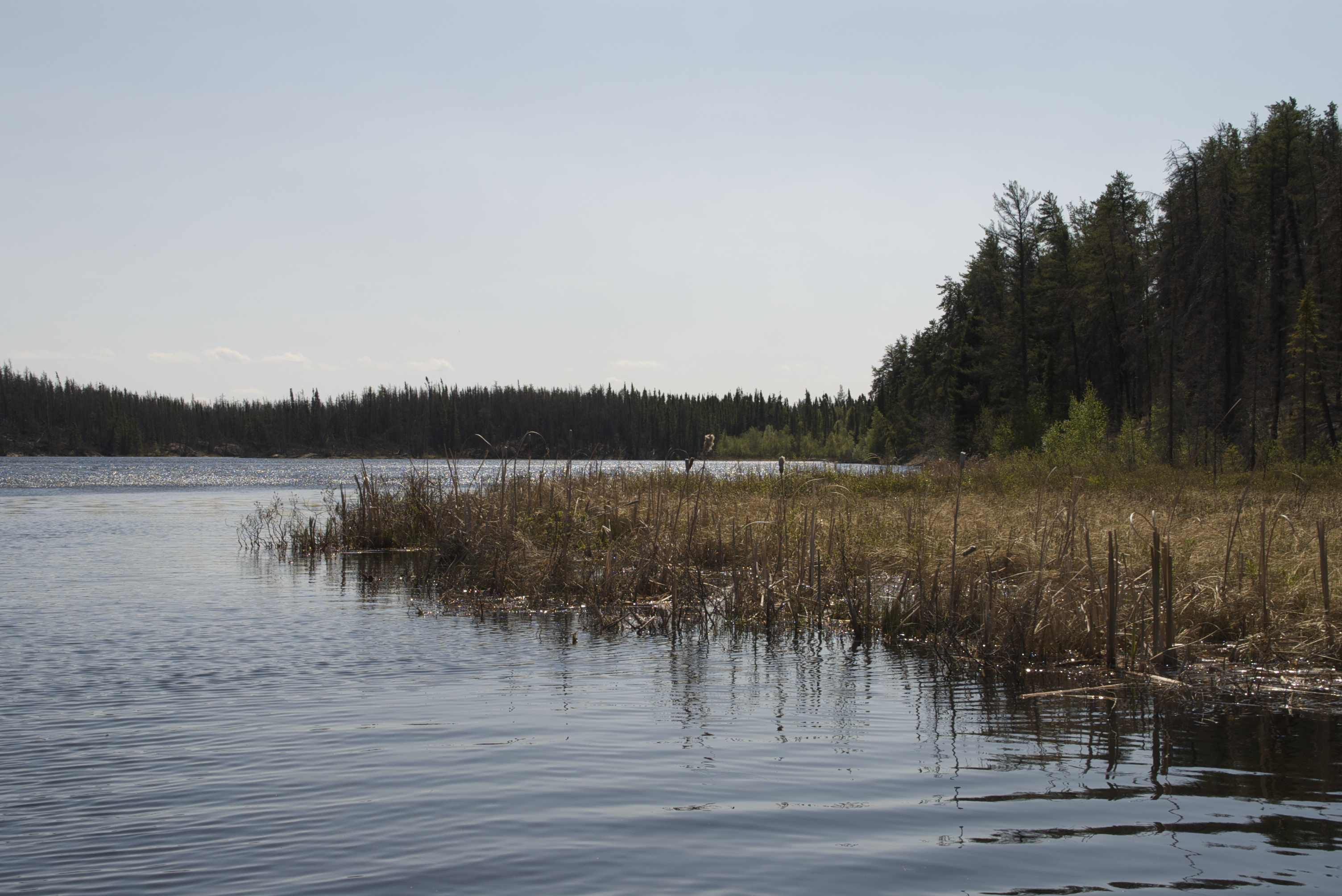
- Payukosap Lake

- Location of the lake in Manitoba Payukosap Lake (Canada)
- Location: Manitoba
- Coordinates: 54°47′45″N 101°22′58″W
- Lake type: Glacial Lake
- Primary inflows: Mistik Creek
- Primary outflows: Mistik Creek
- Basin countries: Canada
- Max. length: 0.5 km (0.31 mi)
- Max. width: 0.5 km (0.31 mi)
- Surface elevation: 322 m (1,056 ft)
- Settlements: None

Payukosap Lake is a glacial lake above the confluence of Holt Lake and Mistik Creek, approximately 23 kilometres (14 mi) northeast of Bakers Narrows. As a segment of the Mistik Creek, it is part of the Nelson River watershed, in the Hudson Bay drainage basin in the Northern Region of Manitoba, Canada. The surrounding mixed deciduous and coniferous forest is part of the Churchill River Upland portion of the Midwestern Canadian Shield forests. The region around the lake consists of rocky parallel ridges with poorly drained areas of muskeg and irregular stony shorelines due to intense glaciation. The lake is situated on the well known "Mistik Creek Loop", a remote canoe route 80 kilometres (50 mi) in length which can be paddled in four days.

Payukosap means 'eleven' in Cree, as all of the fourteen lakes on Mistik Creek are named in numeric order in Cree.

== See also ==
- List of lakes of Manitoba
