= Nesosap Lake =

Lake in Manitoba, Canada

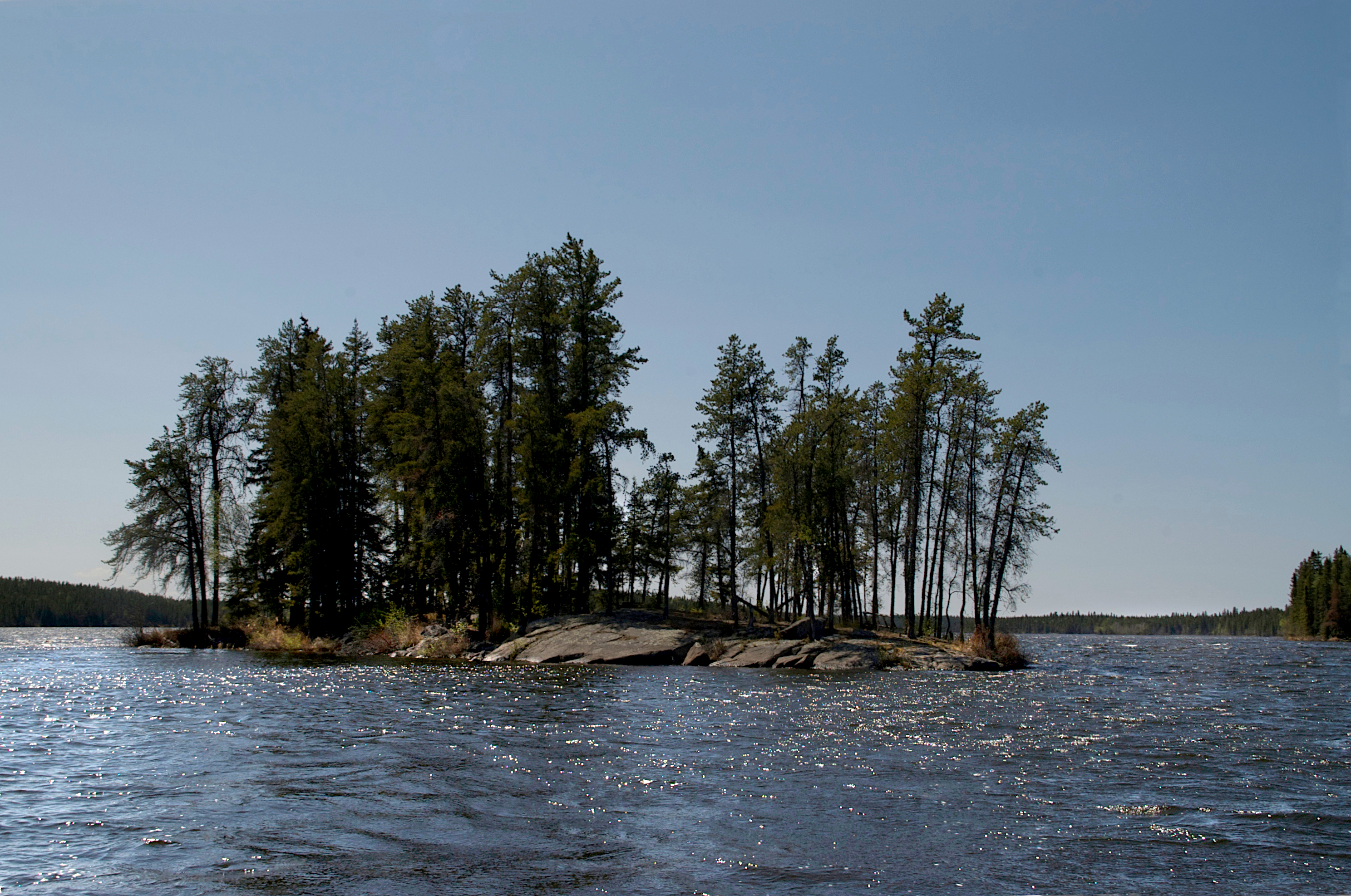
- Rocky island on Nesosap Lake

- Location of the lake in Manitoba Nesosap Lake (Canada)
- Location: Manitoba
- Coordinates: 54°48′23″N 101°25′17″W
- Lake type: Glacial Lake
- Primary inflows: Mistik Creek
- Primary outflows: Mistik Creek
- Basin countries: Canada
- Max. length: 5.2 km (3.2 mi)
- Max. width: 1.5 km (0.93 mi)
- Surface elevation: 326 m (1,070 ft)
- Islands: 20
- Settlements: None

Nesosap Lake is a glacial lake on the Mistik Creek chain, approximately 21 kilometres (13 mi) northeast of Bakers Narrows. As a segment of the Mistik Creek, it is part of the Nelson River watershed, in the Hudson Bay drainage basin in the Northern Region of Manitoba, Canada.

The surrounding mixed deciduous and coniferous forest is part of the Churchill River Upland portion of the Midwestern Canadian Shield forests. The region around the lake consists of rocky parallel ridges with poorly drained areas of muskeg and irregular stony shorelines due to intense glaciation. The lake is situated on the well known "Mistik Creek Loop", a remote canoe route 80 kilometres (50 mi) in length which can be paddled in four days.

The lake contains northern pike, lake whitefish, cisco, walleye, and yellow perch.

Nesosap means 'twelve' in Cree, as all of the fourteen lakes on Mistik Creek are named in numeric order in Cree.

== See also ==
- List of lakes of Manitoba
