= Nikotwasik Lake =

Lake in Manitoba, Canada

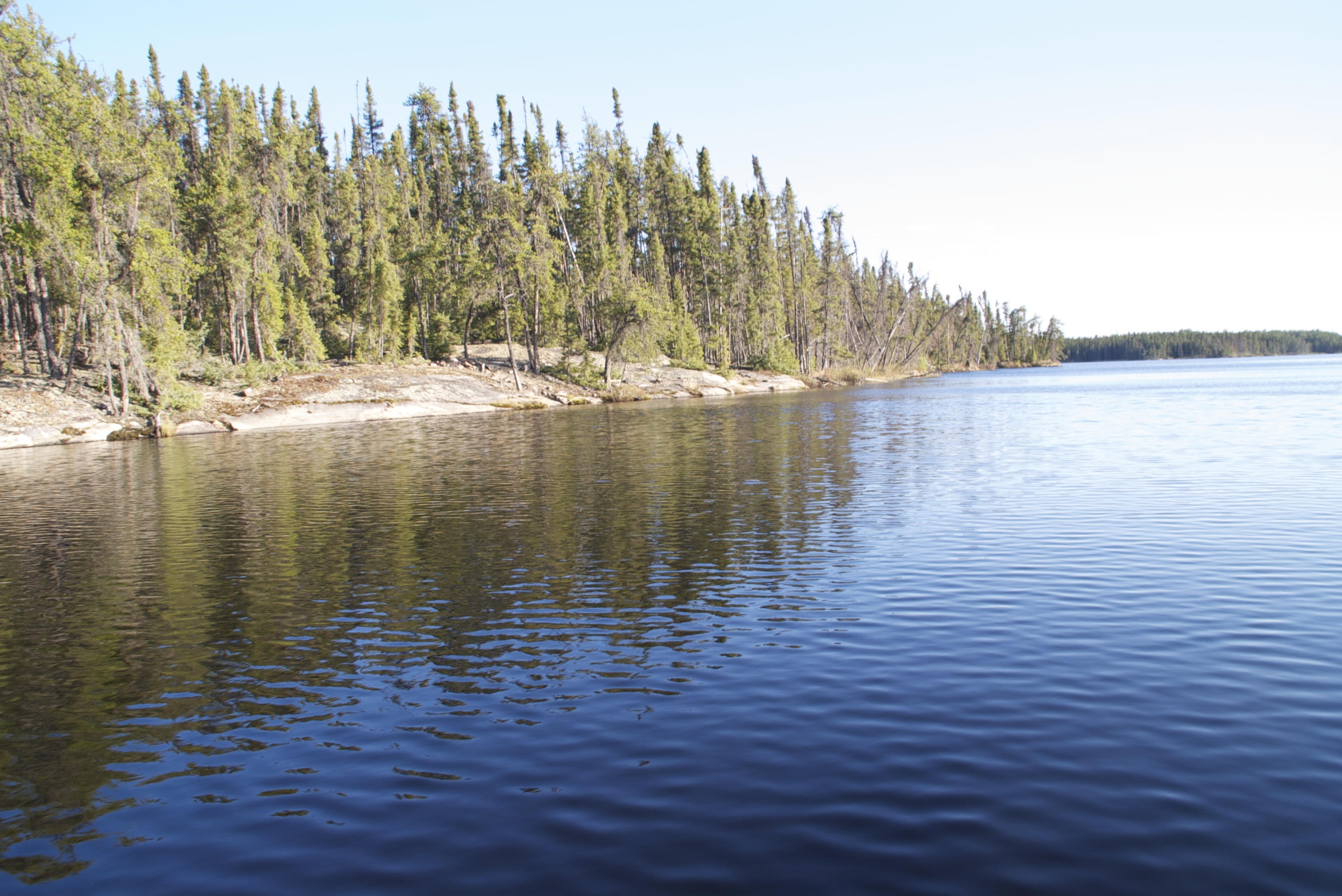
- Nikotwasik Lake

- Location of the lake in Manitoba Nikotwasik Lake (Canada)
- Location: Manitoba
- Coordinates: 54°43′32″N 101°23′11″W
- Lake type: Glacial Lake
- Primary inflows: Mistik Creek
- Primary outflows: Mistik Creek
- Basin countries: Canada
- Max. length: 1.3 km (0.81 mi)
- Max. width: .1 km (0.062 mi)
- Surface elevation: 315 m (1,033 ft)
- Settlements: None

Nikotwasik Lake is narrow glacial lake on the Mistik Creek chain beneath the Vamp Creek confluence. It is in the Hudson Bay drainage basin in the Northern Region of Manitoba, Canada. It sits in the Churchill River Upland portion of the Midwestern Canadian Shield forests which consist of mixed deciduous and coniferous trees.

The lake contains northern pike. The area around the lake consists of rocky parallel ridges with poorly drained areas of muskeg and irregular stony shorelines due to intense glaciation. The lake is situated on the well known "Mistik Creek Loop", a remote canoe route 95 kilometres (59 mi) in length which can be paddled in four days.

Nikotwasik means 'six' in Cree, as all of the fourteen lakes on Mistik Creek are named in numeric order in Cree.

== See also ==
- List of lakes of Manitoba
