= Alberts Lake (Manitoba) =

Lake in Manitoba, Canada

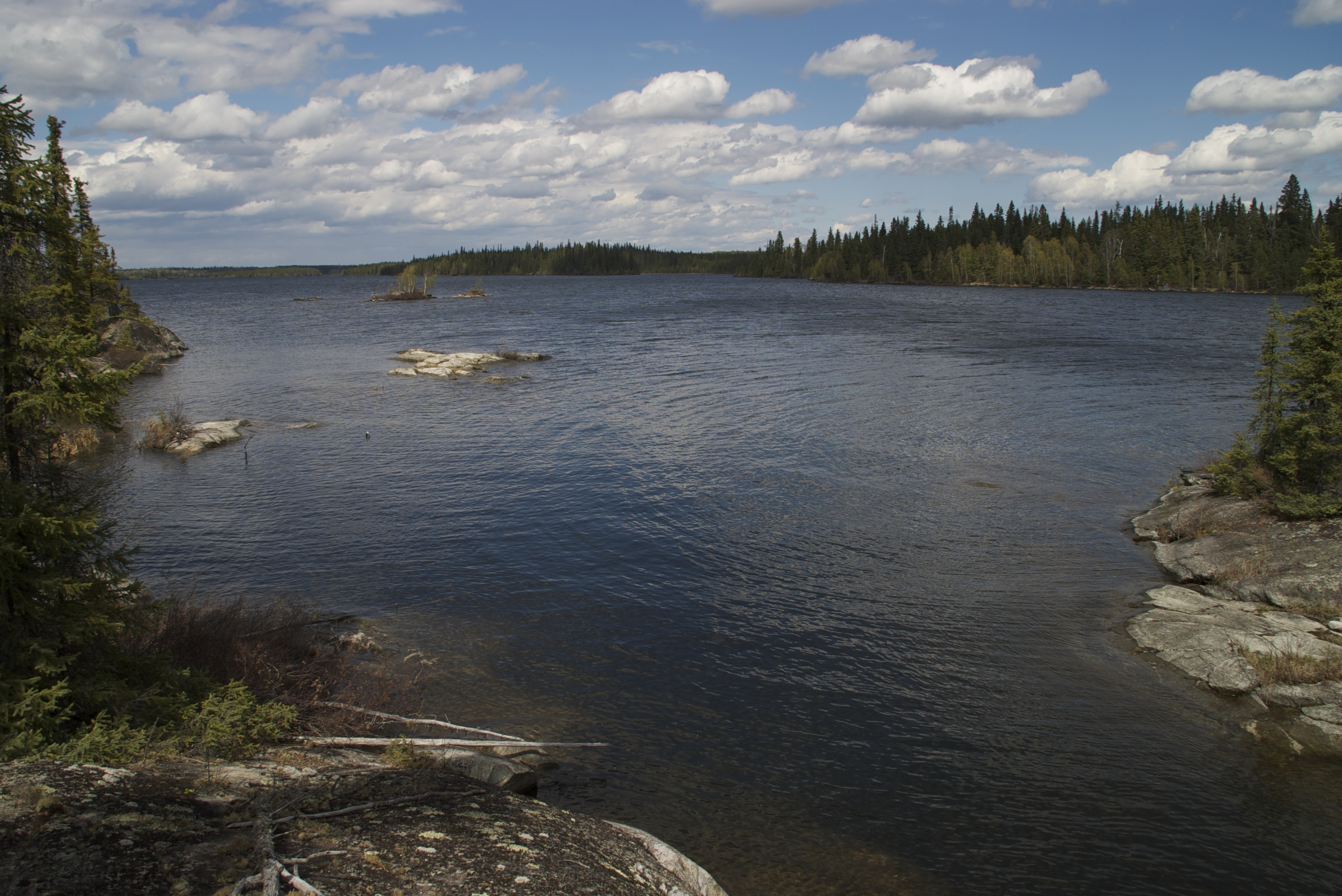
- Alberts Lake

- Location of the lake in Manitoba Alberts Lake (Canada)
- Location: Manitoba
- Coordinates: 54°48′17″N 101°31′59″W
- Lake type: Glacial Lake
- Primary inflows: none
- Primary outflows: Thompson Lake
- Basin countries: Canada
- Max. length: 5.4 km (3.4 mi)
- Max. width: 2 km (1.2 mi)
- Shore length^{1}: 26 km (16 mi)
- Surface elevation: 301 m (988 ft)
- Islands: 27
- ^{1} Shore length is not a well-defined measure.

Alberts Lake is a glacial lake approximately 17 km (11 mi) north-east of Bakers Narrows which drains into Thompson Lake. It is part of the Nelson River watershed, in the Hudson Bay drainage basin in Northern Manitoba, Canada.

== Description ==
The lakes sits in Churchill River Upland portion of the Midwestern Canadian Shield forests and is surrounded by mixed forest with stands of black spruce, white spruce, jack pine, and trembling aspen. The shoreline is characterized by steeply sloping irregular rock ridges and poorly drained areas of muskeg. The lake contains burbot, lake whitefish, northern pike, walleye, and yellow perch. The lake is part of the well-known Mistik Creek Canoe route, and has portages to Leo Lake in the south and Naosap Mud Lake to the north.

== Name ==
The lake was named after Peter Albert, a prospector in the area. The name was officially adopted in 1941.

== Canoe route ==
Alberts Lake is part of the "Mistik Creek Loop," a well-known remote canoe trip which is 80 km (50 mi) in total length and can be paddled in four days. The route begins and ends at Bakers Narrows and from Alberts Lake there are portages north to Naosap Mud Lake and south to Leo Lake.

== See also ==
- List of lakes of Manitoba
