= Uyenanao Lake =

Lake in Manitoba, Canada

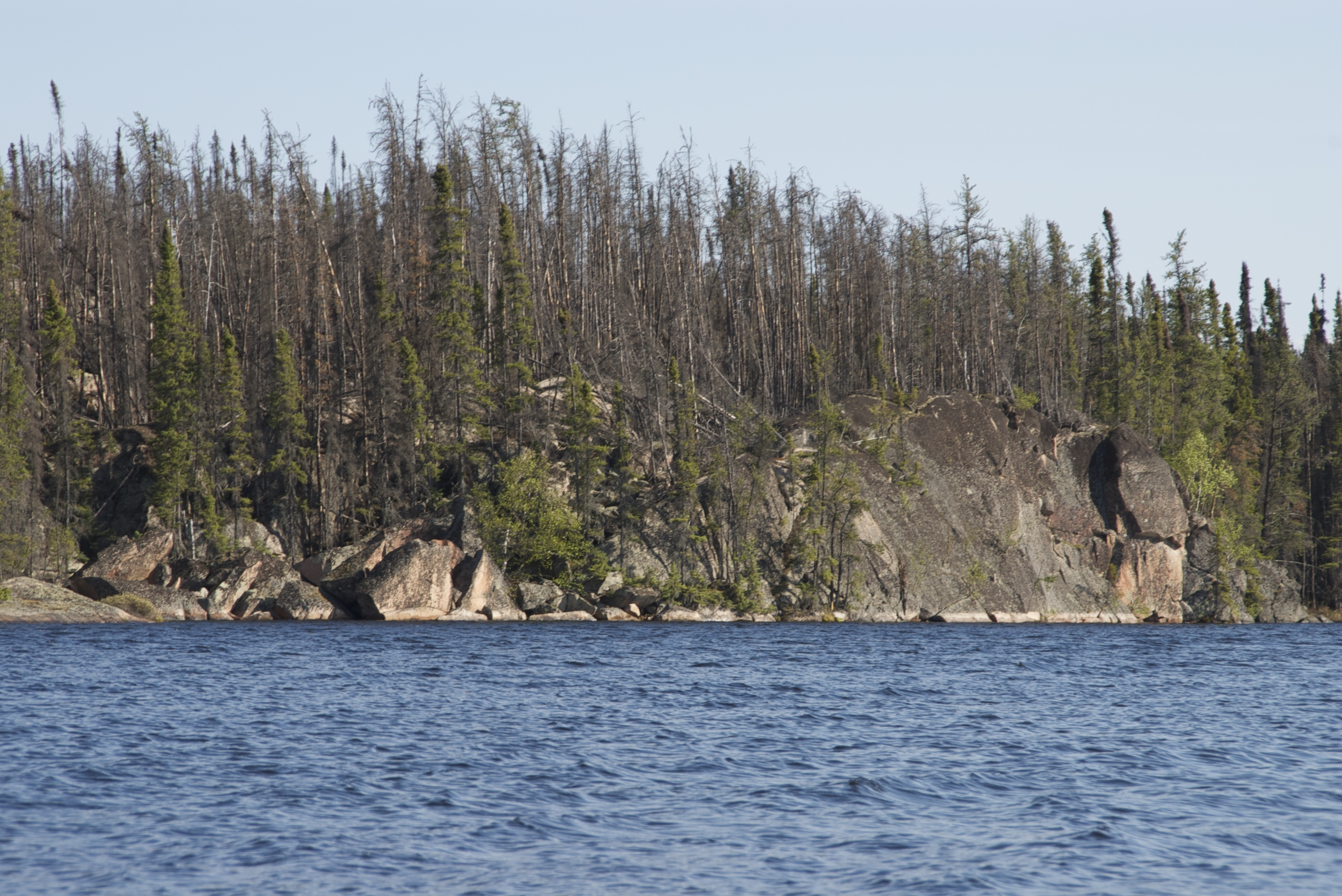
- Burnt shoreline of Uyenanao Lake

- Location of the lake in Manitoba Uyenanao Lake (Canada)
- Location: Manitoba
- Coordinates: 54°45′55″N 101°22′46″W
- Lake type: Glacial Lake
- Primary inflows: Mistik Creek
- Primary outflows: Mistik Creek
- Basin countries: Canada
- Max. length: 0.9 km (0.56 mi)
- Max. width: 0.4 km (0.25 mi)
- Surface elevation: 319 m (1,047 ft)
- Islands: 0

Uyenanao Lake is a glacial lake on the Mistik Creek chain, approximately 20 kilometres (12 mi) northeast of Bakers Narrows. It is part of the Nelson River watershed, in the Hudson Bay drainage basin in the Northern Region of Manitoba, Canada. The surrounding mixed deciduous and coniferous forest is part of the Churchill River Upland portion of the Midwestern Canadian Shield forests. The region around the lake consists of rocky parallel ridges with poorly drained areas of muskeg and irregular stony shorelines due to intense glaciation. The lake is situated on the well known "Mistik Creek Loop", a remote canoe route 80 kilometres (50 mi) in length which can be paddled in four days.

Uyenanao means 'eight' in Cree, as all of the fourteen lakes on Mistik Creek are named in numeric order in Cree.

== See also ==
- List of lakes of Manitoba
