= Niyanun Lake =

Lake in Manitoba, Canada

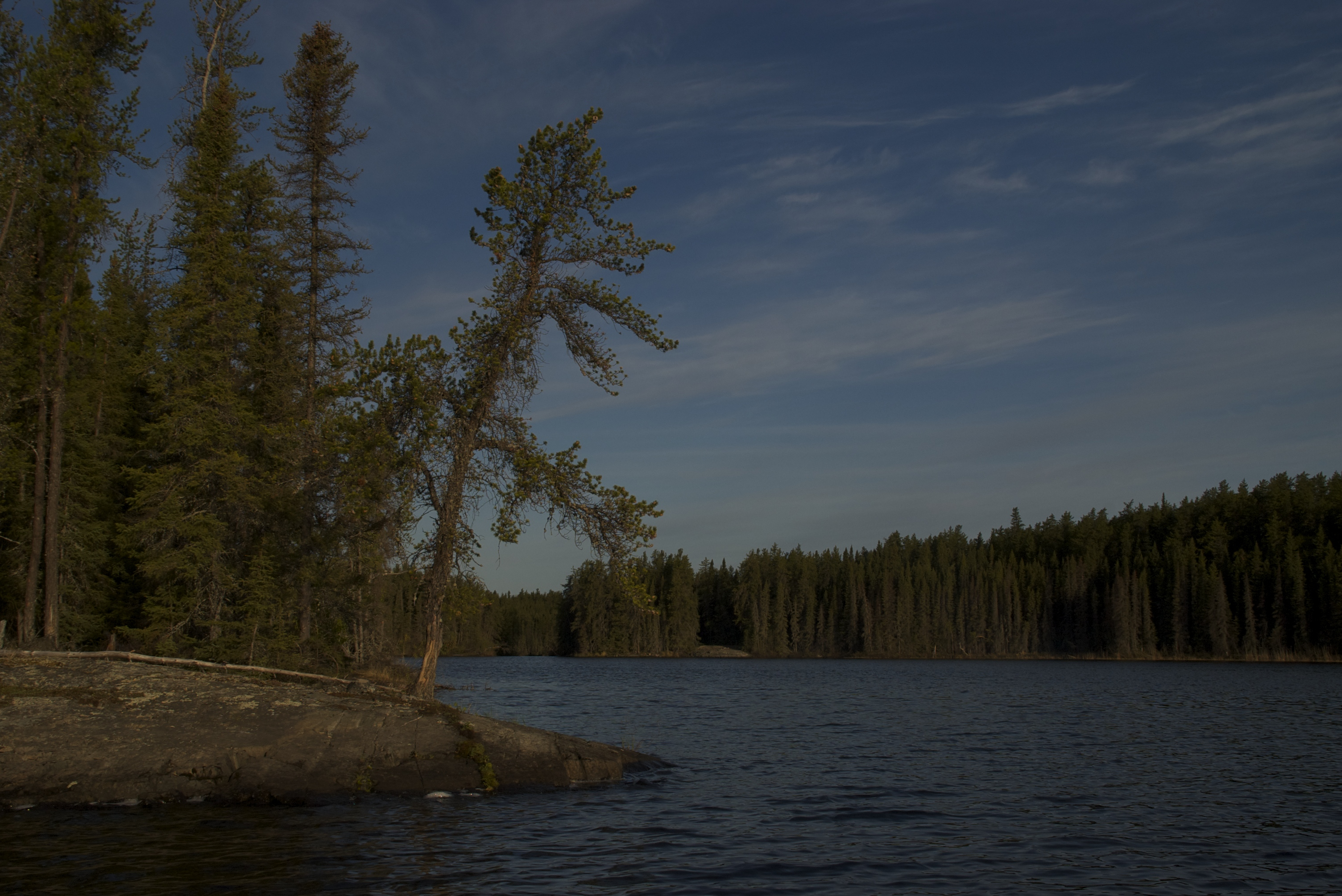
- Niyanan Lake

- Location of the lake in Manitoba Niyanun Lake (Canada)
- Location: Manitoba
- Coordinates: 54°43′20″N 101°23′26″W
- Lake type: Glacial Lake
- Primary inflows: Mistik Creek
- Primary outflows: Mistik Creek
- Basin countries: Canada
- Max. length: 0.8 km (0.50 mi)
- Max. width: 0.4 km (0.25 mi)
- Surface elevation: 315 m (1,033 ft)
- Settlements: None

Niyanun Lake is a glacial lake on the Mistik Creek chain in the Hudson Bay drainage basin in the Northern Region of Manitoba, Canada.

It sits in the Churchill River Upland portion of the Midwestern Canadian Shield forests which consist of mixed deciduous and coniferous trees. The lake is also situated on the well known "Mistik Creek Loop", a remote canoe route 95 kilometres (59 mi) in length which can be paddled in four days.

Niyanun means 'five' in Cree, as all of the fourteen lakes on Mistik Creek are named in numeric order in Cree.

The lake contains northern pike. The region around the lake consists of rocky parallel ridges with poorly drained areas of muskeg and irregular stony shorelines due to intense glaciation.

== See also ==
- List of lakes of Manitoba
