= Mistik Creek =

River in Manitoba, Canada

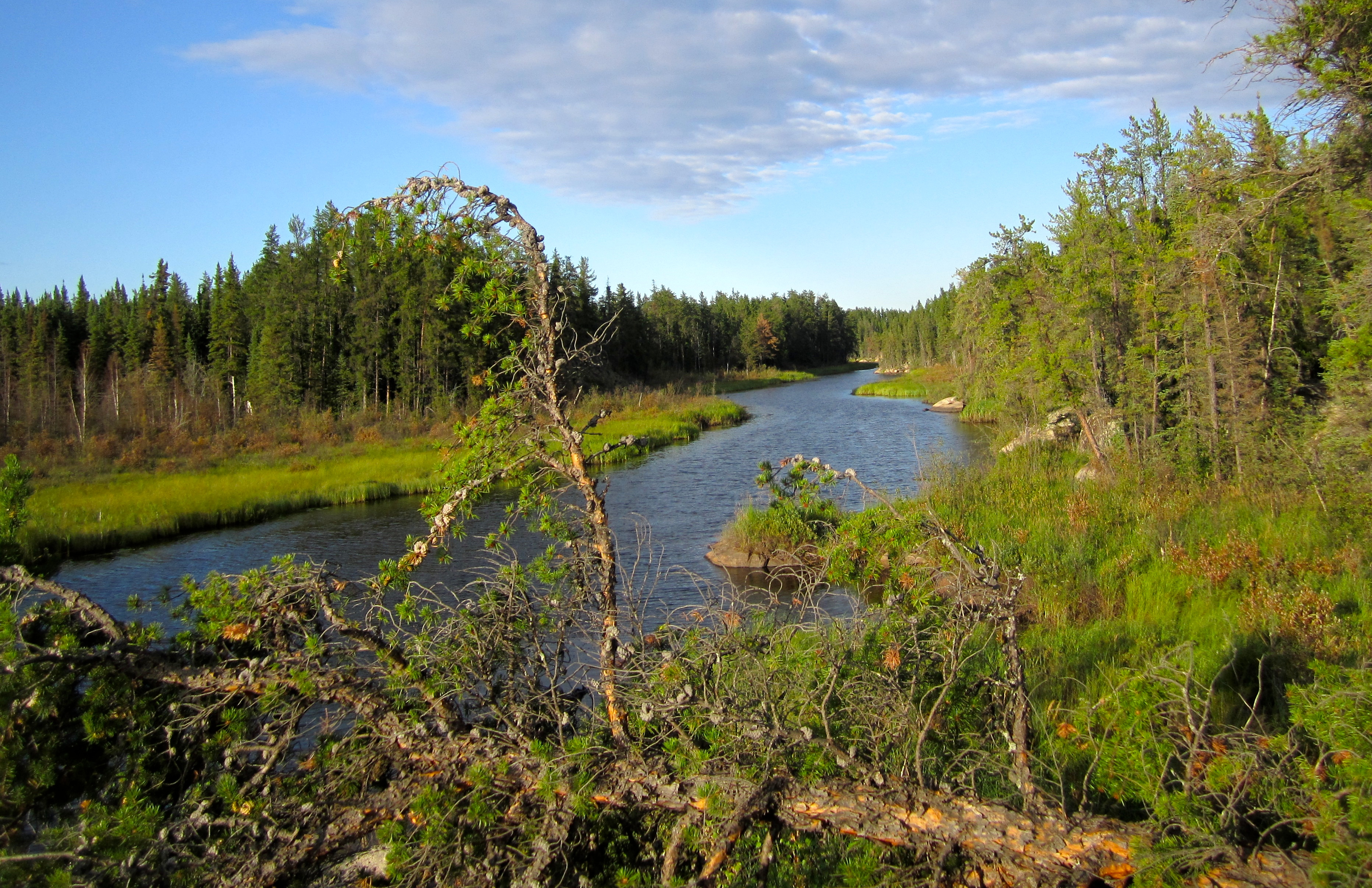
- Mistik Creek looking upstream to the northeast between Nisto Lake and Nao Lake

- Location of Mistik Creek in Manitoba.
- Etymology: "Tree" in Cree

Location
- Country: Canada
- Province: Manitoba
- Region: Northern Region

Physical characteristics
- Source: Naosap Lake
  - coordinates: 54°51′00″N 101°24′50″W
  - elevation: 330.4 m (1,084 ft)
- Mouth: Lake Athapapuskow
  - coordinates: 54°37′32″N 101°34′06″W
  - elevation: 291 m (955 ft)
- Length: 44 km (27 mi)

Basin features
- River system: Nelson River drainage basin
- Tributaries
  - left: Vamp Creek
  - right: Holt Lake

The Mistik Creek is a stream in the Hudson Bay drainage basin in the Northern Region of Manitoba, Canada, approximately 20 kilometres (12 mi) northeast of Bakers Narrows.

Mistik is a Cree word for 'Tree'.

== Description ==
The remote creek flows through Churchill River Upland portion of the Midwestern Canadian Shield forests and is surrounded by mixed forest with stands of black spruce, white spruce, jack pine, and trembling aspen. The shoreline is characterized by steeply sloping irregular rock ridges and poorly drained areas of muskeg.

Mistik Creek area is largely pristine and home to moose, black bear, lynx, wolf, and beaver. It is part of the range of the Naosap woodland caribou herd. Bird species include raven, common loon, spruce grouse, bald eagle, and hawk owl. The creek is not easily accessible, but there is some trapping, hunting, and recreational fishing activity.

== Course ==
The river begins in Naosap Lake, and the upper lakes lie in very irregular basins with low banks surrounded by muskeg and flows slowly. Downstream, the lakes become smaller and the river portions form continuous rapids. At Neso Lake, the creek passes by the Neso Lake Provincial Park and under Manitoba Highway 10, before emptying into Lake Athapapuskow via Payuk Lake's outflow Payuk Creek.

=== Tributaries ===
- Holt Lake (right)
- Vamp Creek (left)

== Lakes ==
Mistik Creek notably includes fourteen lakes, named in numeric order in Cree. In order from south to north, these lakes (including their English translation) are:

- Payuk Lake ('One') — outflow
- Neso Lake ('Two')
- Nisto Lake = ('Three')
- Nao Lake = ('Four')
- Niyanun Lake ('Five')
- Nikotwasik Lake ('Six')
- Tapukok Lake ('Seven')
- Uyenanao Lake ('Eight')
- Kakat Lake ('Nine')
- Mitatut Lake ('Ten')
- Payukosap Lake ('Eleven')
- Nesosap Lake ('Twelve')
- Nistosap Lake ('Thirteen')
- Naosap Lake =('Fourteen') — source

== Mistik Creek Loop ==
The Mistik Creek Loop is a well-known remote wilderness canoe trip, 95 kilometres (59 mi) in total length, which can be paddled in four to five days. The route is characterized by many short, unmarked portages around small sets of rapids. It begins and ends at Bakers Narrows and relies on longer portages between Lake Athapapuskow, Alberts Lake, and Naosap Lake

== See also ==
- List of rivers of Manitoba
