= Naosap Lake =

Glacial lake in Manitoba, Canada

- Location of the lake in Manitoba Naosap Lake (Canada)
- Location: Manitoba
- Coordinates: 54°51′3″N 101°23′17″W
- Lake type: Glacial Lake
- Primary outflows: Mistik Creek
- Basin countries: Canada
- Max. length: 11 km (6.8 mi)
- Max. width: 5 km (3.1 mi)
- Surface elevation: 330 m (1,080 ft)
- Islands: 51
- Settlements: None

Naosap Lake is a glacial lake in Canada, located approximately 28 kilometres (17 mi) northeast of Bakers Narrows, Manitoba. As the source of the Mistik Creek, it is part of the Nelson River watershed, in the Hudson Bay drainage basin in the Northern Region of Manitoba.

The surrounding mixed deciduous and coniferous forest is part of the Churchill River Upland portion of the Midwestern Canadian Shield forests. The region around the lake consists of rocky parallel ridges with poorly drained areas of muskeg and irregular stony shorelines due to intense glaciation. The lake is situated on the well known "Mistik Creek Loop," a remote canoe route of 80 kilometres (50 mi).

The lake is accessible by road on the west end. The centre of the lake is dominated by the large Wickstendt Island, named after the trapper and prospector Tom Wickstendt who staked claims there in the 1940s. The lake contains northern pike, lake whitefish, and yellow perch. There are also herds of woodland caribou near the lake.

Naosap is a Cree word meaning 'fourteen', as all of the fourteen lakes on Mistik Creek are named in numeric order in Cree.

== See also ==
- List of lakes of Manitoba
