= Nisto Lake =

Lake in Manitoba, Canada

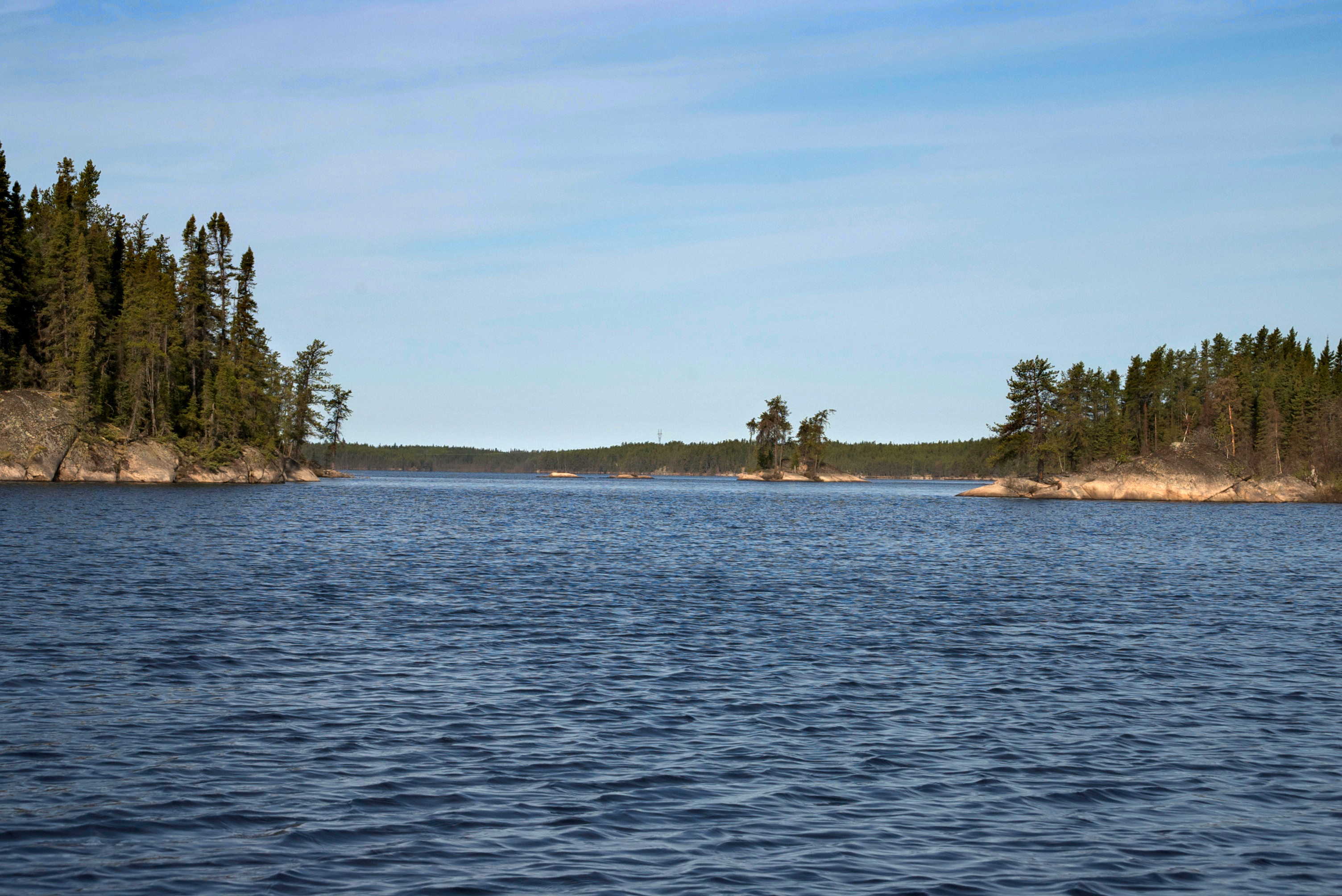

- Location within Manitoba Location within Canada
- Location: Manitoba
- Coordinates: 54°42′1″N 101°30′12″W
- Lake type: Glacial Lake
- Primary inflows: Mistik Creek
- Primary outflows: Mistik Creek
- Basin countries: Canada
- Max. length: 3.8 km (2.4 mi)
- Max. width: 0.9 km (0.56 mi)
- Surface elevation: 308 m (1,010 ft)
- Islands: 7
- Settlements: None

Nisto Lake is a glacial lake on the Mistik Creek chain in the Hudson Bay drainage basin in the Northern Region of Manitoba, Canada. It sits in the Churchill River Upland portion of the Midwestern Canadian Shield forests which consist of mixed deciduous and coniferous trees. The region around the lake consists of rocky parallel ridges with poorly drained areas of muskeg and irregular rocky shorelines due to intense glaciation. The lake is situated on the well-known "Mistik Creek Loop", a remote canoe route which is 80 km in total length can be paddled in four days.

Nisto means 'three' in Cree, as all of the fourteen lakes on Mistik Creek are named in numeric order in Cree.

== See also ==
- List of lakes of Manitoba
