= Neso Lake =

Lake in Manitoba, Canada

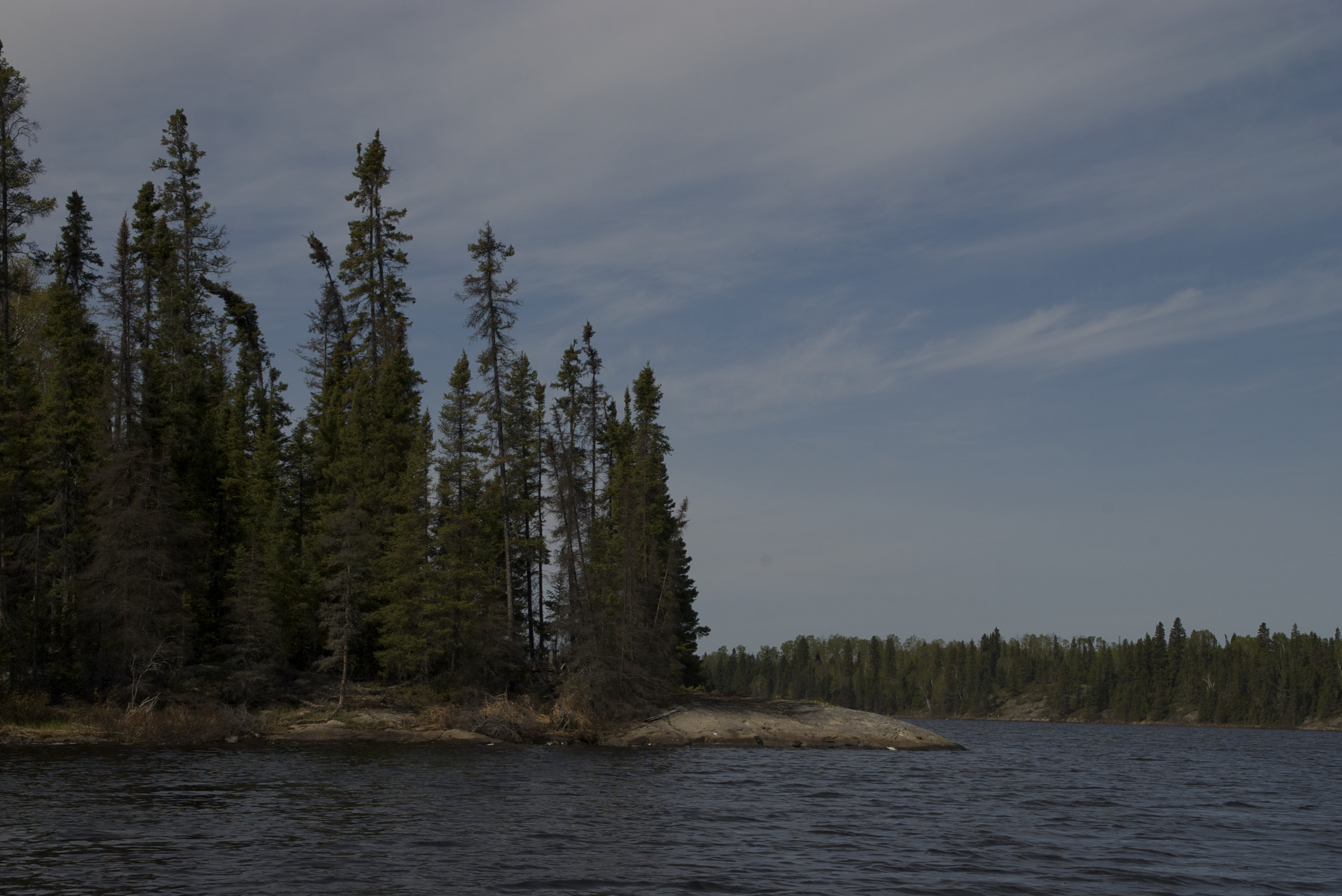
- Neso Lake

- Location of the lake in Manitoba Neso Lake (Canada)
- Location: Manitoba
- Coordinates: 54°40′5″N 101°32′30″W
- Lake type: Glacial Lake
- Primary inflows: Mistik Creek
- Primary outflows: Mistik Creek
- Basin countries: Canada
- Max. length: 4.5 km (2.8 mi)
- Max. width: 1.9 km (1.2 mi)
- Surface elevation: 302 m (991 ft)
- Islands: 14
- Settlements: None

Neso Lake is a glacial lake on the Mistik Creek chain in the Hudson Bay drainage basin in the Northern Region of Manitoba, Canada. It sits in the Churchill River Upland portion of the Midwestern Canadian Shield forests which consist of mixed coniferous forest trees. The region around the lake consists of rocky parallel ridges with poorly drained areas of muskeg and irregular rocky shorelines due to intense glaciation. The lake is situated on the well known "Mistik Creek Loop", a remote canoe route which is 95 km (59 mi) in total length and can be paddled in four days.

There is a fishing lodge and a provincial park located on the lake.

The name Neso means 'two' in Cree, as all of the fourteen lakes on Mistik Creek are named in numeric order in Cree.

== See also ==
- List of lakes of Manitoba
