= Boreal Shield Ecozone =

Largest ecozone in Canada, stretching from Saskatchewan to Newfoundland

Boreal Shield
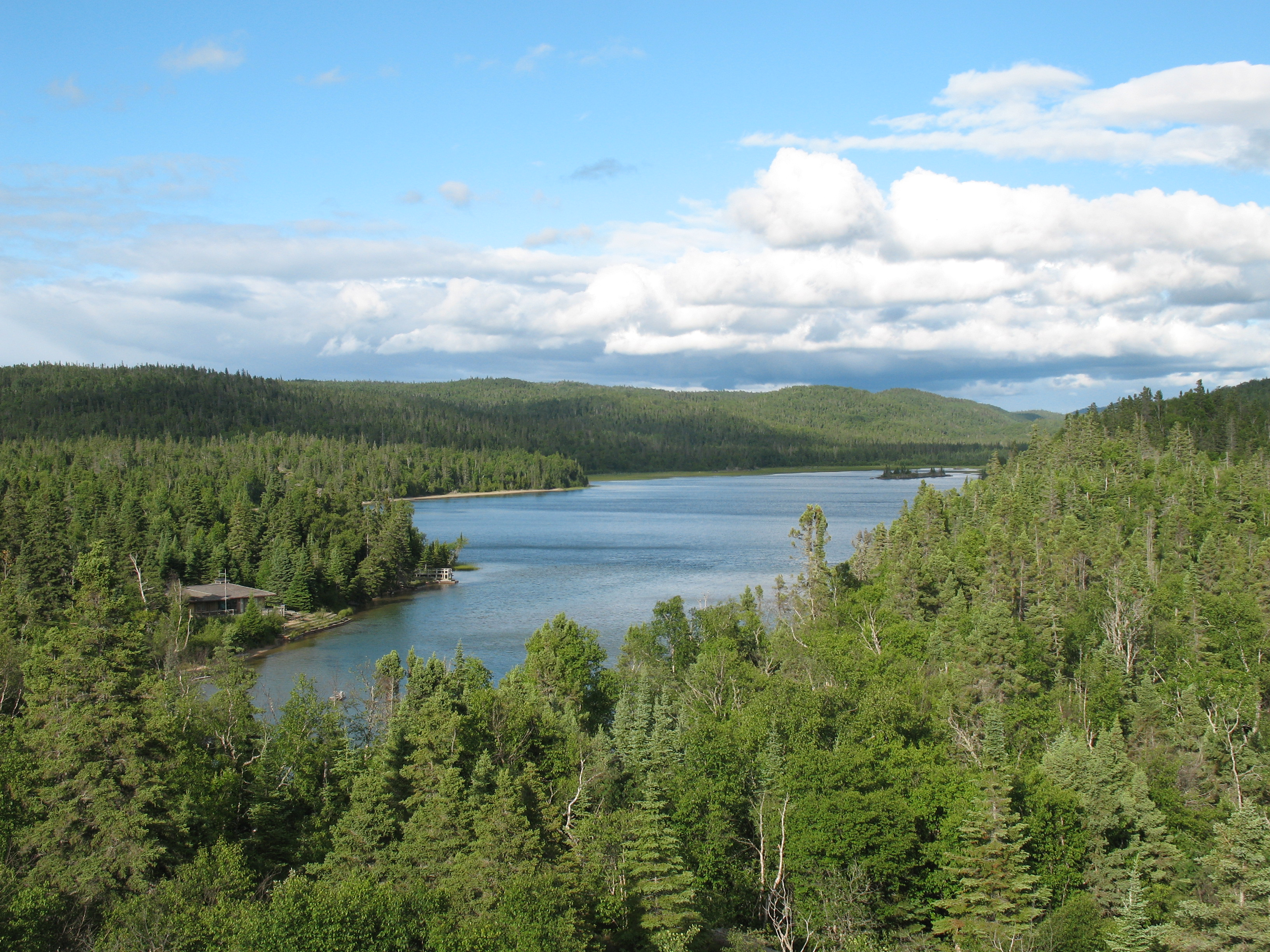
- Balsam fir-white spruce forest in Pukaskwa National Park, Ontario

Ecology
- Borders: List: Atlantic Maritime; Boreal Plains; Hudson Plains; Mixedwood Plains; Taiga Shield

Geography
- Area: 1,937,517 km^{2} (748,079 mi^{2})
- Country: Canada
- Provinces: Alberta; Manitoba; Newfoundland and Labrador; Ontario; Quebec; Saskatchewan
- Climate type: Humid continental and subarctic

The Boreal Shield Ecozone, as defined by the Commission for Environmental Cooperation (CEC), is the largest ecozone in Canada. Covering 1.8 million square kilometres it covers almost 20% of Canada's landmass, stretching from northern Saskatchewan to Newfoundland.

== Geography ==
=== Landforms ===
The retreat of the Laurentide Ice Sheet left a landscape of broadly rolling uplands and lowlands with precambrian granitic bedrock outcrops. Few clear drainage channels were left in the rocky sediments deposited by the glacier resulting in a deranged drainage pattern. The numerous wetlands and lakes formed give this ecozone a unique character. Water features in this ecozone contain 22% of Canada's freshwater surface area.

=== Soils ===
Soil types vary widely across the region in response to the wide range of climate and soil components present. Cryosols are found in the most northerly areas wherever there is permafrost. Accumulation of organic matter, particularly peat, results in organic soils in much of the area. Brunisols occur in the north and west of the region where coarse to medium sediments are found. In these soils, soil formation is ongoing and will eventually result in either podzols or luvisols. In the south and east, podzols are found under forests growing primarily on sand in cold conditions. Gleysols are found where poor drainage has resulted in depleted oxygen. Luvisols are present where forests overlay clay deposits. These two soil types occur across the region wherever these conditions occur.

=== Ecoprovinces ===
This ecozone can be further subdivided into six ecoprovinces:

- Eastern Boreal Shield
- Lake of the Woods
- Mid-Boreal Shield
- Newfoundland
- Southern Boreal Shield
- Western Boreal Shield

=== Ecoregions ===
Each province continues to work on defining subregions within the larger national ecozone and ecoprovince system.

The Alberta Natural Subregion - Natural Regions (2006) found within this ecozone are:

- Tazin River Upland - Taiga Shield

The Manitoba Ecoregions within this ecozone are:

- Churchill River Upland Ecoregion
- Hayes River Upland Ecoregion
- Lac Seul Upland Ecoregion
- Lake of the Woods Ecoregion

The Saskatchewan Ecoregions within this ecozone are:

- Churchill River Upland Ecoregion
- Athabasca Plain Ecoregion

== Climate ==
The regional climate has long, cold winters and short summers, conditions which are moderated in coastal regions. Summers in the east are warmer than those in the west of the region. The mean annual temperature ranges from −4 °C in northern Saskatchewan to 5.5 °C in Newfoundland. Precipitation increases from west to east.

== Ecology ==
=== Flora ===
The region is widely forested with white and black spruce, balsam fir and jack pine. Deciduous trees are more common in the south, with white birch, trembling aspen and balsam poplar. There are also yellow birch and sugar maple to the east. In areas of muskeg there are stands of black spruce or tamarack. There are frequent forest fires.

=== Fauna ===
Being largely wild and remote, this ecozone is rich in wildlife, including woodland caribou, moose, wolf, black bear, raccoon, marten, fisher, striped skunk, lynx, bobcat and eastern chipmunk. Common birds include Boreal owl, great horned owl, blue jay, white-throated sparrow and evening grosbeak. Lakes contain brook char, lake trout, northern pike, perch, and walleye.

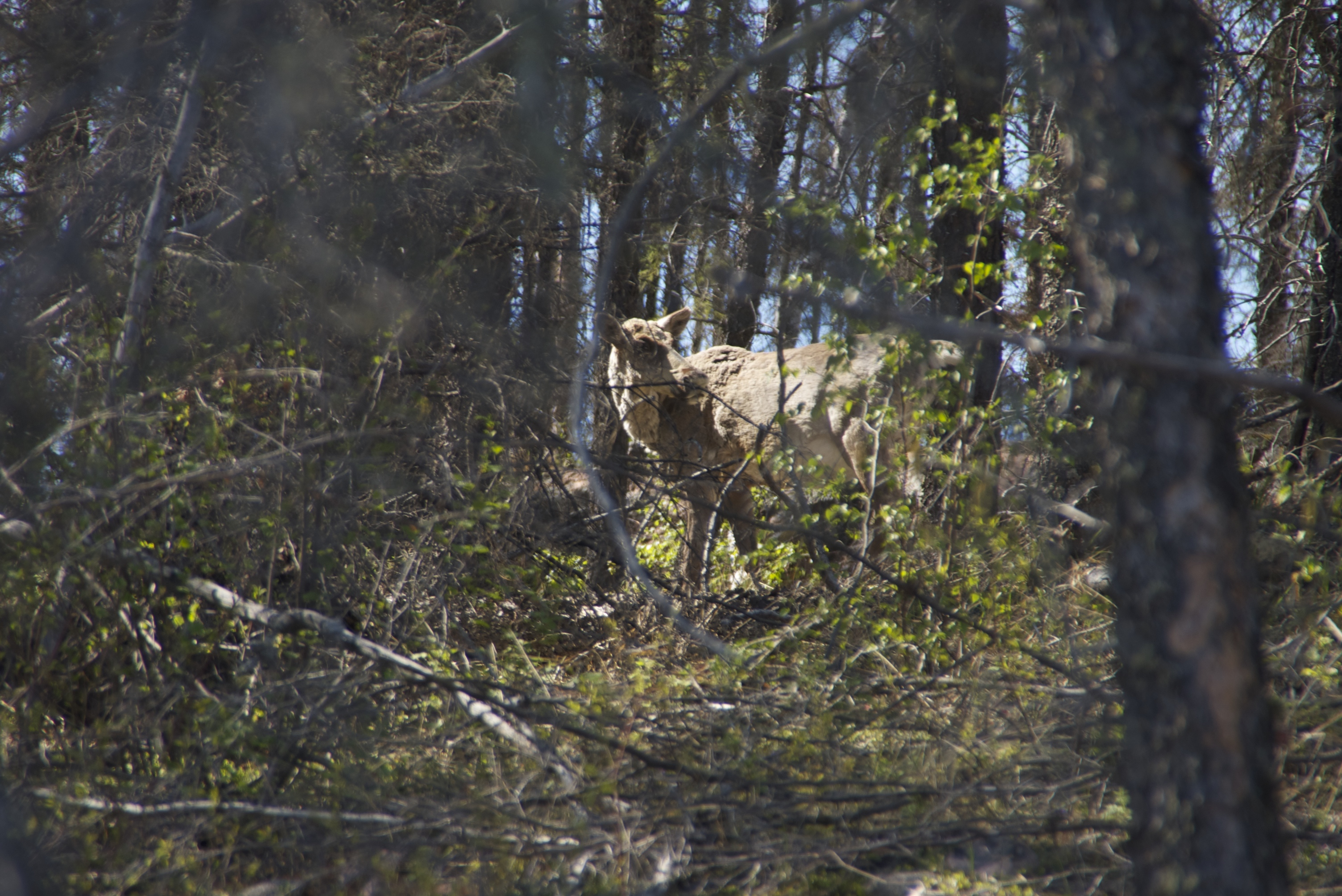
Woodland Caribou at Holt Lake in Manitoba

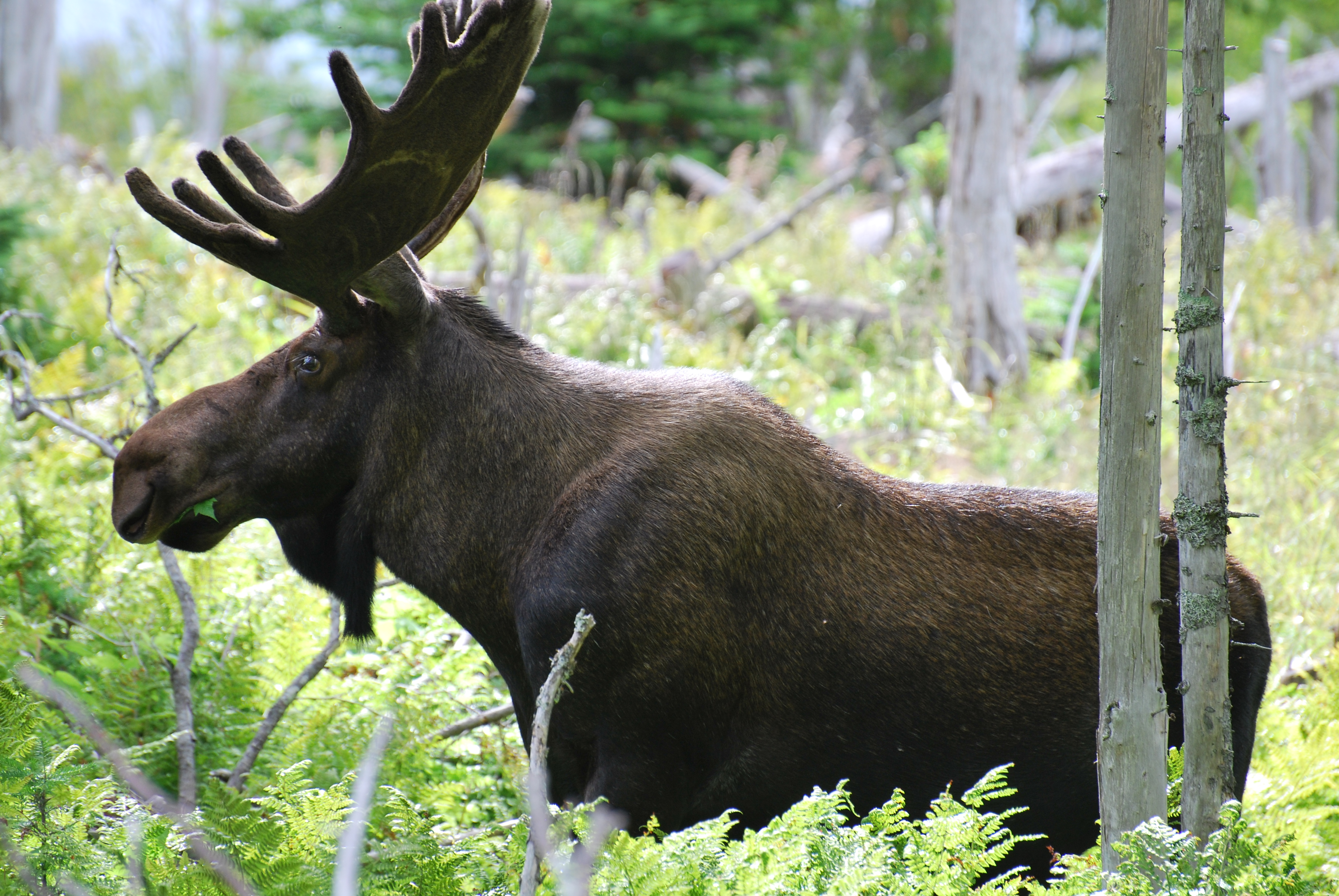
Moose in Gros-Morne National Park, Newfoundland

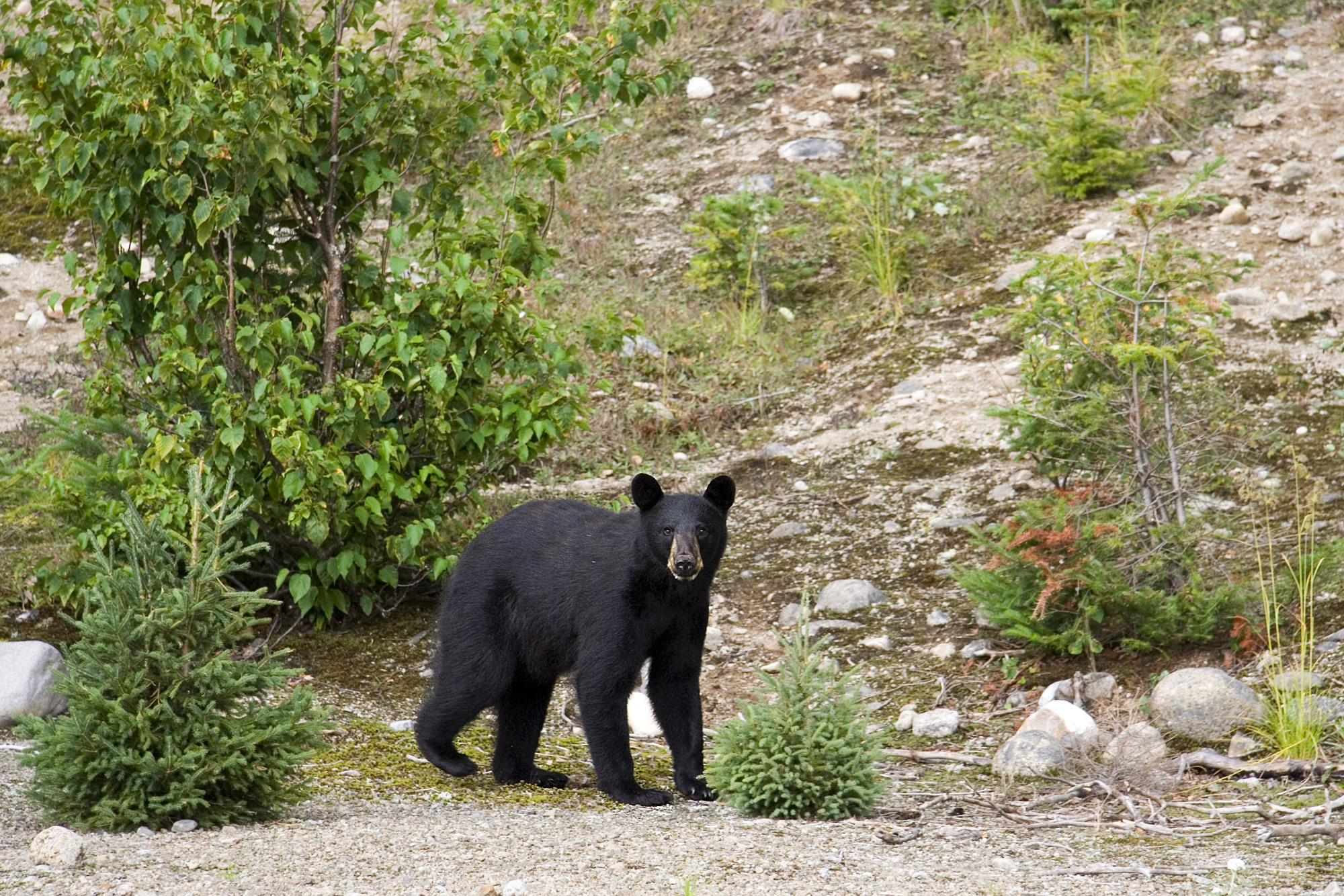
American Black Bear in Quebec

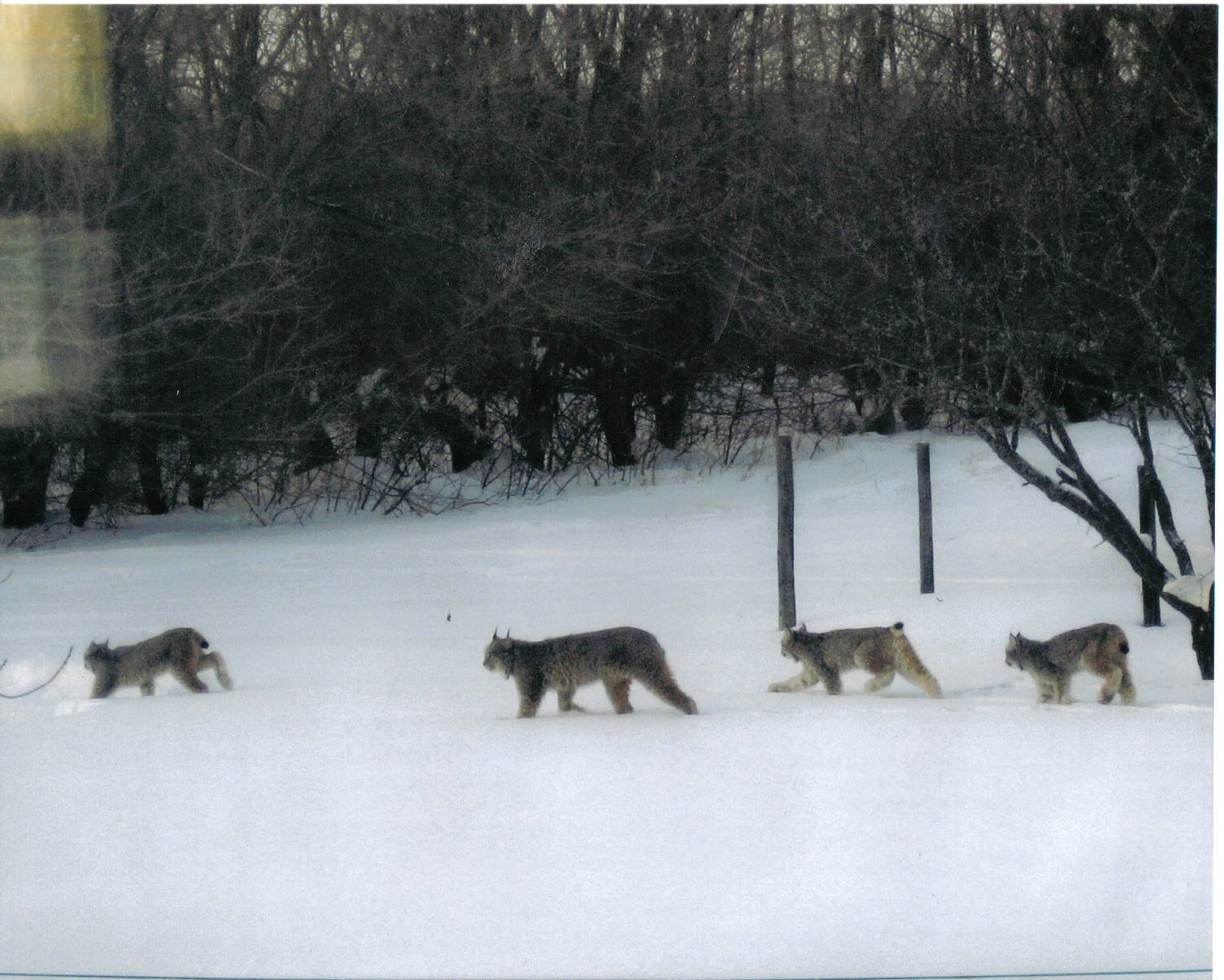
Lynx family near Dauphin Manitoba

Off the northern and eastern coasts, aquatic mammals include grey seal, harp seal, hooded seal, ringed seal, sperm whale, orca, Atlantic pilot whale, fin whale, blue whale, northern right whale, bowhead whale, and humpback whale.

== Climate change ==
Fire suppression, insect control, clear-cutting and single-species tree farming are widespread in accessible areas. These practices may, over the long term, reduce the diversity of both plant and animal species and increase the forest's vulnerability to disease.

Many Shield lakes and soils are extremely sensitive to changes in pH. Acid rain from local sources and from the long-range transport of airborne pollutants has already taken an ominous toll. It may be weakening the general vigour and growth rate of trees, as well as of aquatic species, in sensitive areas.

== Conservation ==
Under 3% of the ecozone's total land space forbids industrial activities of any kind; this land space is therefore designated as protected. Another 5% of the ecozone's land space is also considered protected, though not as strictly; activities such as mining or forestry may be tolerable in such areas. The Boreal Shield is the largest ecozone in Canada, however, compared to other ecozones, it exhibits among the smallest shares of land that have been deemed protected. Because the region is abundant in forest land, it is subject to extensive forestry practices.

In order to strengthen public dialogue and engagement on matters concerned with protected areas within the ecozone, land allocation programs have been adopted in Ontario and Saskatchewan. The programs consist of local and regional-level advisory groups that serve to help select and manage conservation areas in these provinces.

=== Protected areas ===
A number of protected areas have been established to protect representative and/or significant portions of this ecozone. These include Georgian Bay Islands National Park, Gros Morne National Park, La Mauricie National Park, Mealy Mountains National Park Reserve, Mingan Archipelago National Park Reserve, Pukaskwa National Park, and Terra Nova National Park.
