= Nao Lake =

Lake in Manitoba, Canada

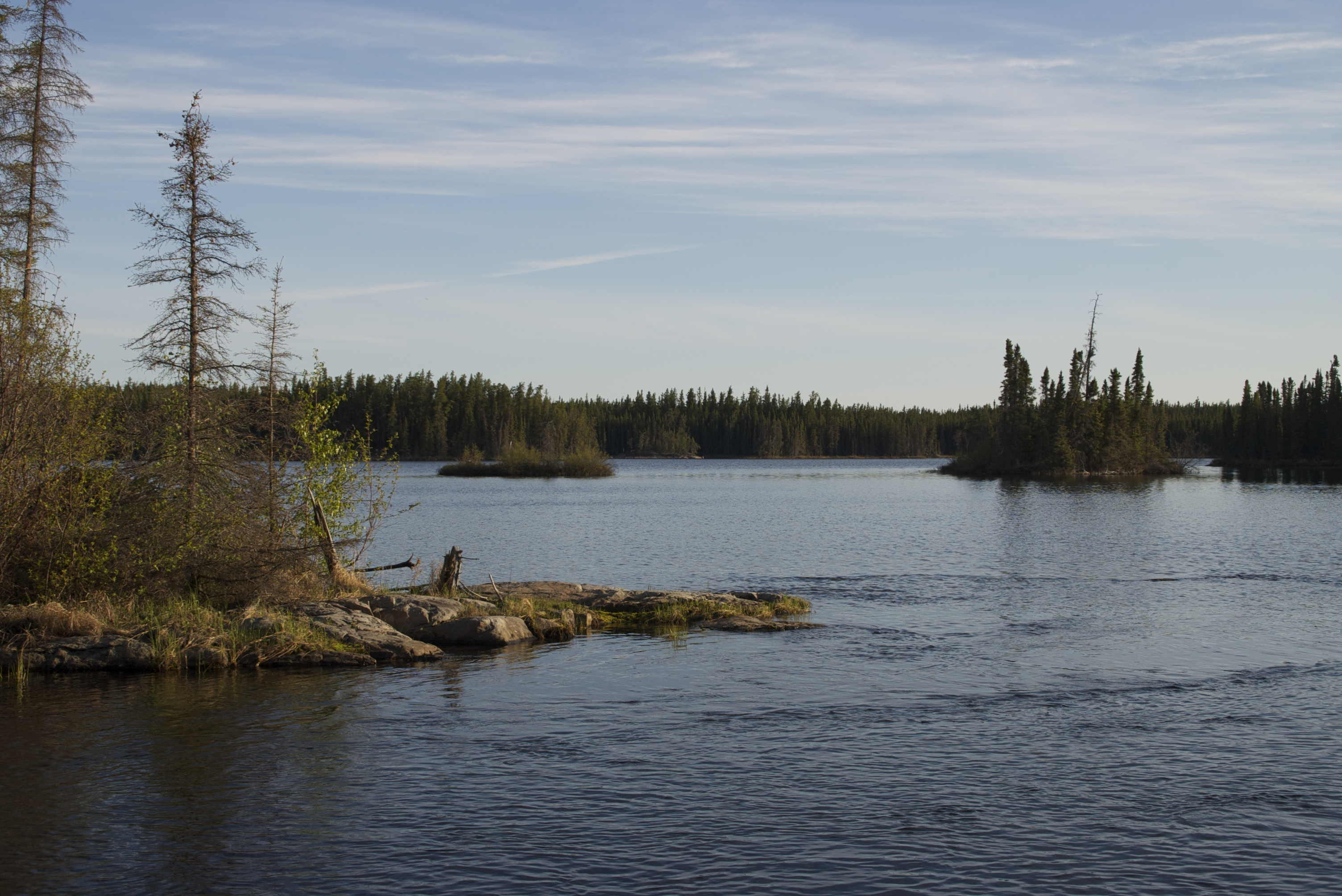
- Nao Lake at the Mistik Creek outlet

- Location of the lake in Manitoba Nao Lake (Canada)
- Location: Manitoba
- Coordinates: 54°43′4″N 101°25′47″W
- Lake type: Glacial Lake
- Primary inflows: Mistik Creek
- Primary outflows: Mistik Creek
- Basin countries: Canada
- Max. length: 1.5 km (0.93 mi)
- Max. width: 0.6 km (0.37 mi)
- Surface elevation: 319 m (1,047 ft)
- Islands: 4
- Settlements: None

Nao Lake is a glacial lake on the Mistik Creek chain in the Hudson Bay drainage basin in the Northern Region of Manitoba, Canada. It sits in the Churchill River Upland portion of the Midwestern Canadian Shield forests which consist of mixed deciduous and coniferous trees. The region around the lake consists of rocky parallel ridges with poorly drained areas of muskeg and irregular rocky shorelines due to intense glaciation. The lake is situated on the well known "Mistik Creek Loop", a remote canoe route 95 kilometres (59 mi) in length which can be paddled in four days.

Nao is a Cree word meaning 'four', as all of the fourteen lakes on Mistik Creek are named in numeric order in Cree.

== See also ==
- List of lakes of Manitoba
