= Vamp Creek =

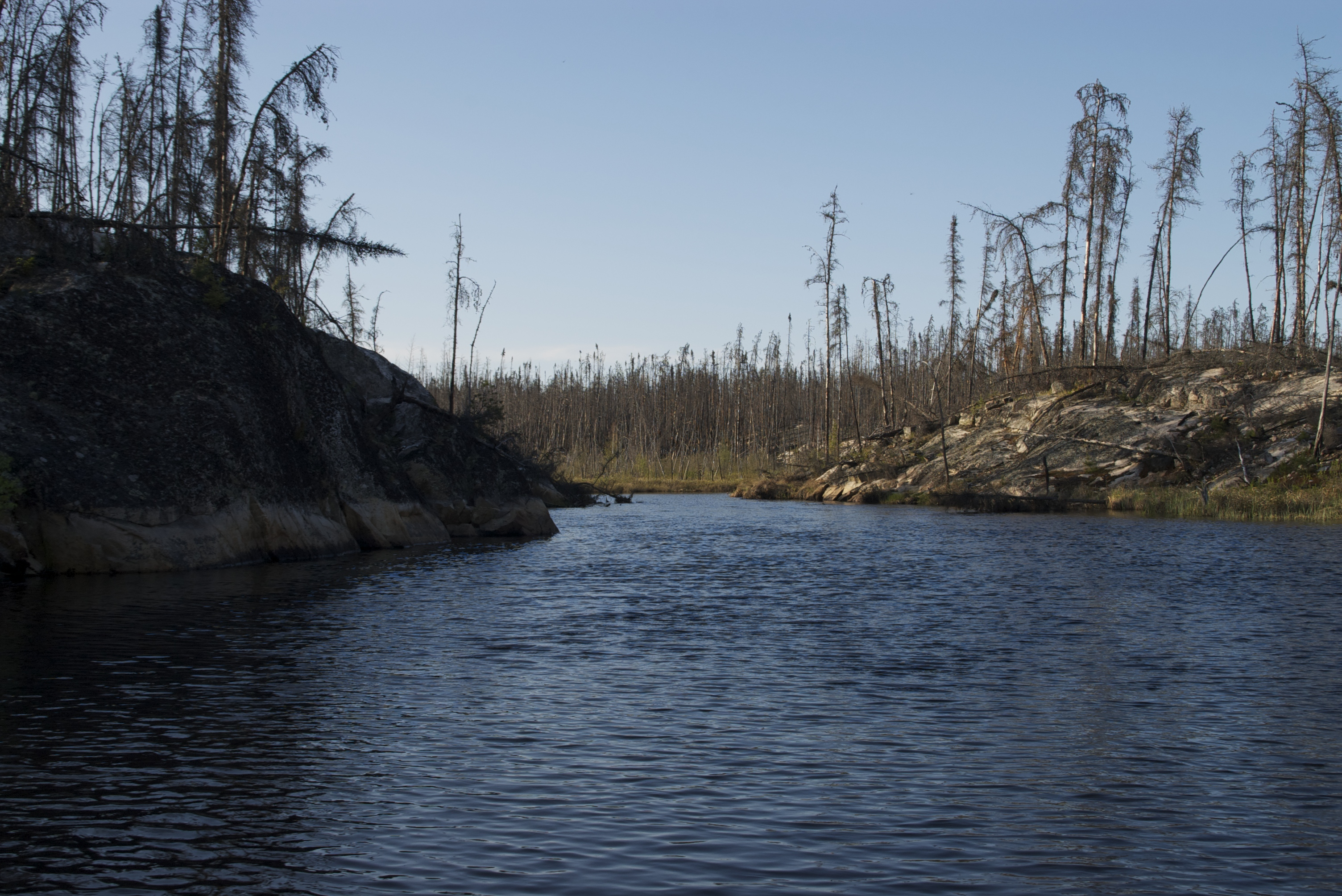
- Vamp Creek outlet into Mistik Creek

- Location of Vamp Creek in Manitoba.
- Etymology: Named after song

Location
- Country: Canada
- Province: Manitoba
- Region: Northern Region

Physical characteristics
- Source: Vamp Lake
  - coordinates: 54°55′42″N 101°10′9″W
  - elevation: 342 m (1,122 ft)
- Mouth: Mistik Creek
  - coordinates: 54°44′26″N 101°22′18″W
  - elevation: 315 m (1,033 ft)
- Length: 23.4 km (14.5 mi)

Basin features
- River system: Nelson River drainage basin

Vamp Creek is a river in the Hudson Bay drainage basin in the Northern Region of Manitoba, Canada, approximately 25 kilometres (16 mi) north-east of Bakers Narrows.

== Description ==
The remote creek flows through Churchill River Upland portion of the Midwestern Canadian Shield forests and is surrounded by mixed forest with stands of black spruce, white spruce, jack pine, and trembling aspen. The shoreline is characterized by steeply sloping irregular rock ridges and poorly drained areas of muskeg.

Vamp Creek area is difficult to access and largely pristine. It is home to moose, black bear, lynx, wolf, and beaver. It is part of the range of the Naosap woodland caribou herd. Bird species include raven, common loon, spruce grouse, bald eagle and hawk-owl. The creek is only accessible by canoe or snowmobile, but there is some trapping, and hunting activity.

== Etymology ==
"The Vamp"
Phil Harris Orchestra performing, 1932

Vamp Creek was named during a 1920 expedition of the Dominion Land Survey. The surveyors lost a gramophone record of the Byron Gay song "The Vamp", published in 1919.

== See also ==
- List of rivers of Manitoba
