= Payuk Lake =

Lake in Manitoba, Canada

- Location of the lake in Manitoba Payuk Lake (Canada)
- Location: Manitoba
- Coordinates: 54°39′N 101°29.7′W
- Lake type: Glacial Lake
- Primary inflows: Mistik Creek
- Primary outflows: Payuk Creek
- Basin countries: Canada
- Max. length: 4.5 km (2.8 mi)
- Max. width: 1.5 km (0.93 mi)
- Islands: 20
- Settlements: None

Payuk Lake is a glacial lake located nine kilometres (5.6 mi) southeast of Bakers Narrows, Manitoba, Canada.

The name Payuk, which was officially registered in 1999, means 'one' in Cree, as all of the fourteen lakes on Mistik Creek are named in numeric order in Cree.

== Description ==
Payuk Lake is oriented in a southwest to northeast direction. The primary inlet is Mistik Creek and it drains via Payuk Creek into Lake Athapapuskow as part of the Nelson River basin. The lake is surrounded by Precambrian boreal forest, a mixed forest of coniferous and deciduous trees of the Canadian Shield including black spruce and jack pine.

There is a paved boat launch accessible from Highway 10.

Payuk Lake is also a popular game fishing area, and its fish species include walleye, northern pike, and white sucker.

== See also ==
- List of lakes of Manitoba
