= Holt Lake (Manitoba) =

Lake in Manitoba, Canada

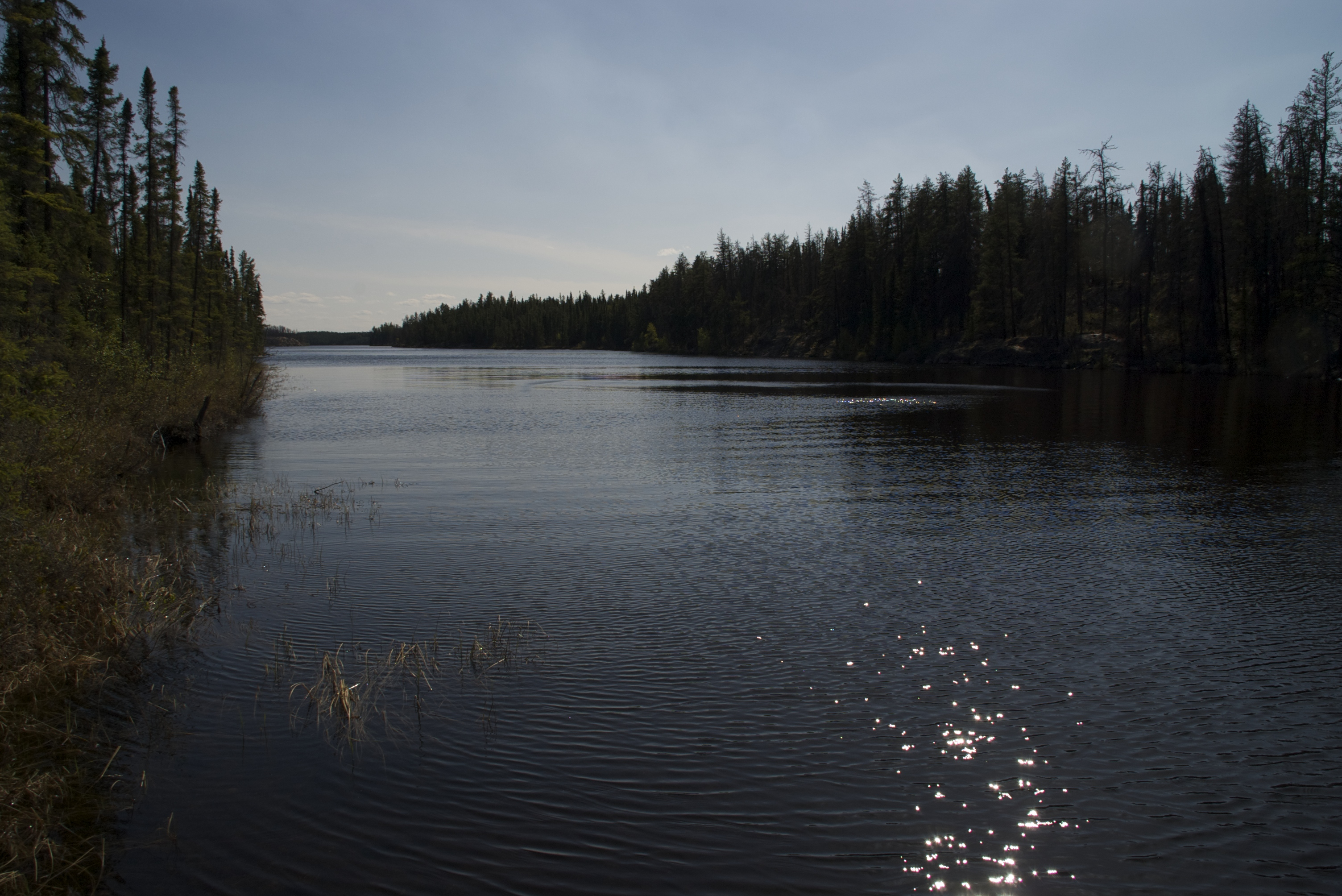
- Holt Lake looking southwest

- Location of the lake in Manitoba Holt Lake (Canada)
- Location: Manitoba
- Coordinates: 54°46′3″N 101°24′53″W
- Lake type: Glacial Lake
- Primary outflows: Mistik Creek
- Basin countries: Canada
- Max. length: 3.4 km (2.1 mi)
- Max. width: 0.4 km (0.25 mi)
- Shore length^{1}: 8 km (5.0 mi)
- Surface elevation: 326 m (1,070 ft)
- Islands: 0
- ^{1} Shore length is not a well-defined measure.

Holt Lake is a glacial lake that drains into the Kakat Lake, approximately 20 kilometres (12 mi) northeast of Bakers Narrows. As a tributary of Mistik Creek, it is part of the Nelson River watershed, in the Hudson Bay drainage basin in the Northern Region of Manitoba, Canada. The lake sits in Churchill River Upland portion of the Midwestern Canadian Shield forests and is surrounded by mixed forest with stands of black spruce, white spruce, jack pine, and trembling aspen. The shoreline is characterized by steeply sloping irregular rock ridges and poorly drained areas of muskeg.

The region around the lake is largely inaccessible and very wild and is the home to woodland caribou.

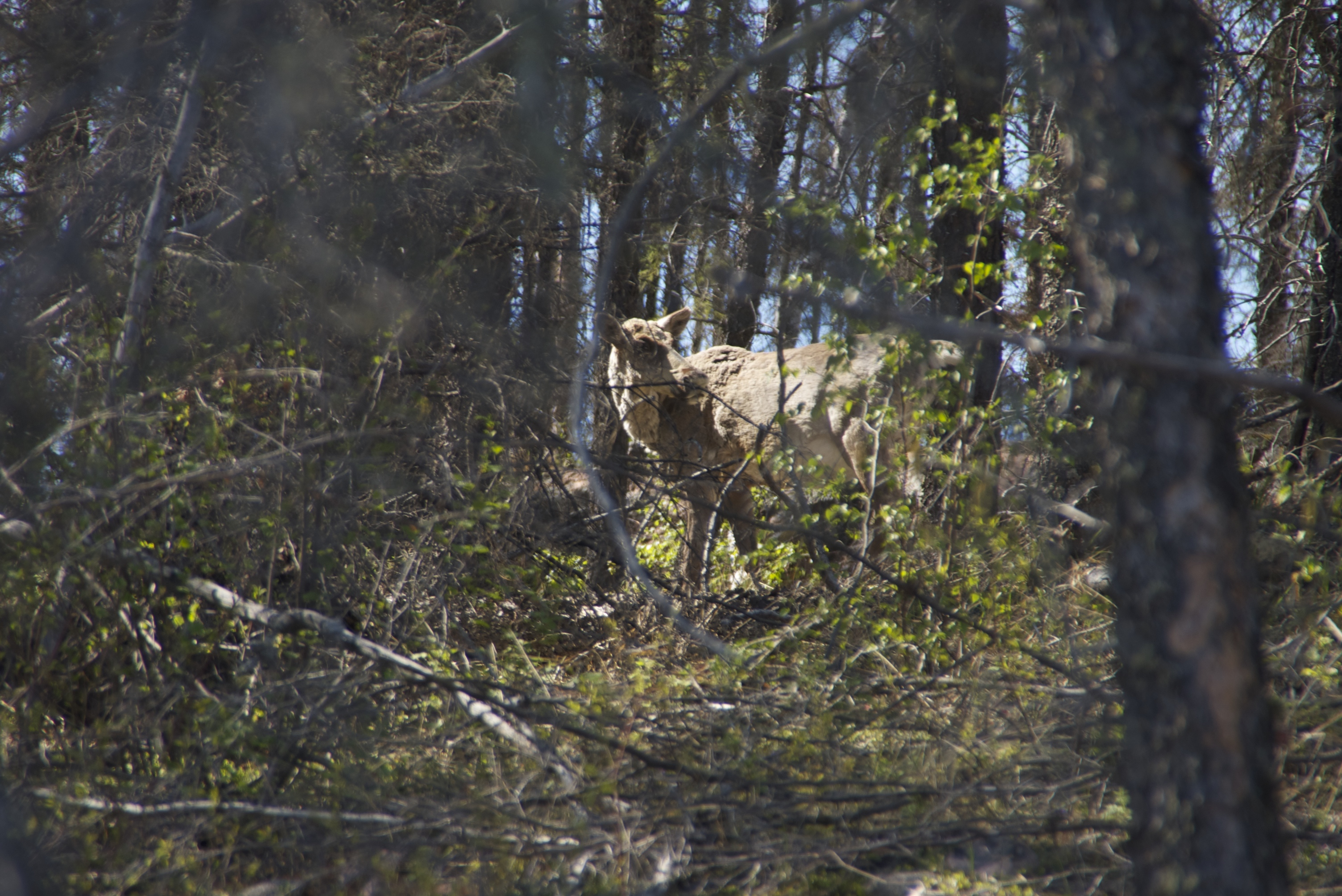
Woodland Caribou of the Naosap Lake Herd on Holt Lake

Holt lake is named after a trapper who lived on the lake in the 1920s and kept a tame lynx and wolf.

== See also ==
- List of lakes of Manitoba
