= Flin Flon Airport =

Airport in Manitoba, Canada

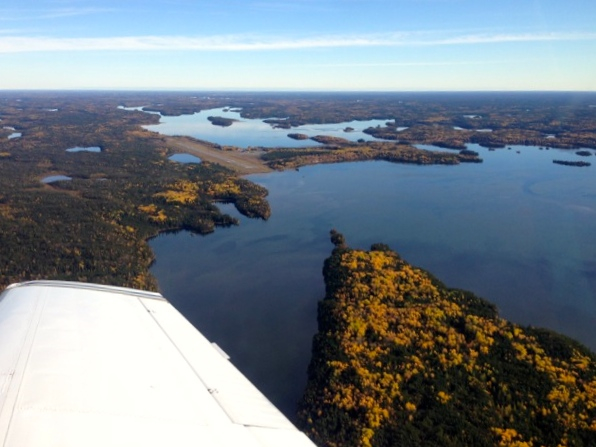
- Flin Flon airport as seen from the south
- IATA: YFO; ICAO: CYFO

Summary
- Airport type: Public
- Operator: City of Flin Flon
- Location: Bakers Narrows, near Flin Flon, Manitoba
- Time zone: CST (UTC−06:00)
  - Summer (DST): CDT (UTC−05:00)
- Elevation AMSL: 998 ft (304 m)
- Coordinates: 54°40′41″N 101°40′55″W

Map
- Location in Manitoba CYFO (Canada)

Runways
Direction	Length		Surface
Direction	ft	m	Surface
01/19	5,004	1,525	Asphalt

Statistics (2010)
- Aircraft movements: 6,551
- Source: Canada Flight Supplement; Movements from Statistics Canada

Flin Flon Airport (IATA: YFO, ICAO: CYFO) is located 8 nautical miles (15 km; 9.2 mi) southeast of Flin Flon, Manitoba, Canada, in the community of Bakers Narrows, on the shores of Lake Athapapuskow. The Airport is owned and operated by the City of Flin Flon.

== Airlines and destinations ==
The airport is served by Calm Air, providing daily prop-jet service to Winnipeg. In addition, the airport serves both private and commercial operations and serves as a tanker base for Ministry of Natural Resources water bombers.

Airlines	Destinations
Calm Air	The Pas, Winnipeg

== History ==
The Flin Flon Municipal Airport opened on May 26, 1962. Pilot Steve Olench, with the mayor and John Diefenbaker cabinet minister Gordon Churchill as passengers, marked the opening by driving a Cessna aircraft through a ceremonial ribbon. Aviation in Flin Flon goes beyond the airport with float planes landing on, and departing from, Schist Lake near Channing.

The 2025 Canadian wildfires encircled the city of Flin Flon. The Airport was essential for Water Bomber services and evacuations. At the fires peak, all airport staff were evacuated from the city as well.

== See also ==
- Flin Flon/Channing Water Aerodrome
- Flin Flon/Bakers Narrows Water Aerodrome
- List of airports in Manitoba
