= Bakers Narrows =

- Unincorporated Community
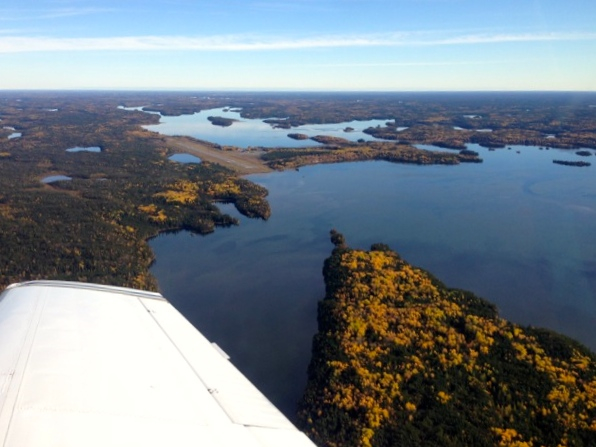
- Bakers Narrows, Little Athapap, and the North Arm, as seen from the south

- Location in Manitoba
- Coordinates: 54°40′38″N 101°39′37″W
- Canada: Canada
- Province: Manitoba
- Region: Northern Region
- Census division: 21

Government
  - MLA (Flin Flon): Tom Lindsey (NDP)
  - MP (Churchill): Niki Ashton (NDP)

Area
  - Total: 1.45 km^{2} (0.56 sq mi)
- Time zone: UTC−6 (CST)
  - Summer (DST): UTC−5 (CDT)
- Postal code: R8A 1M6
- Area code: 204
- Founder: William Baker
- Highways: PTH 10

Bakers Narrows, Manitoba, is a small residential community approximately 20 km (12 mi) southeast of Flin Flon on Lake Athapapuskow. There are five subdivisions located near the lakeshore with a total of approximately 150 cottages, many of which are permanent residences.

== Description ==
The community consists of both winterized homes and seasonal cottages. It straddles the North Arm and Little Athapap sections of Lake Athapapuskow and lies within Bakers Narrows Provincial Park. It is the location of the Flin Flon Airport and the Flin Flon/Bakers Narrows Water Aerodrome.

The remote community is surrounded by Precambrian boreal forest, a mixed forest of coniferous and deciduous trees of the Canadian Shield. There are stands of black spruce, jack pine, white spruce, and trembling aspen. The area is home to moose, black bear, lynx, wolf, and beaver. Bird species include raven, common loon, spruce grouse, bald eagle and hawk owl. There is some trapping and hunting, and recreational fishing is popular.

== History ==
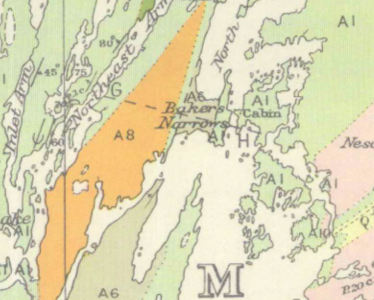
First published map (1917) to use the place name Bakers Narrows

The narrows have been inhabited since prehistoric times. Archaeological digs at Bakers Narrows Provincial Park revealed pottery, arrowheads, and other artifacts indicating regular habitation by people of the Shield Archaic tradition, who hunted caribou in the area as far back as 7000 years ago. They were eventually supplanted by the Woodland Cree who were nomadic hunters in this region. The narrows were a seasonal camp for Cree families who would gather during the summer before heading to their individual hunting grounds in the autumn.

The first European to visit Bakers Narrows was Joseph Hansom. In the summer of 1773, as a young fur trader, he was sent inland by the Governor of Churchill to extend the reach of the Hudson's Bay Company. Hansom paddled from Lake Kississing down the Pineroot River, reaching Lake Athapapuskow and Bakers Narrows. Donaldson B. Dowling, working for the Geological Survey of Canada, was the first to survey the narrows in 1899.

The name comes from the first homesteader, Bill Baker a trapper and prospector from Ontario, who settled there with his wife Lydia Paul (from the Cumberland House Cree Nation) in approximately 1910 with the intention of establishing a trading post. In the early days, it was also called "Bakers Landing". To serve the growing mining industry in the Flin Flon area, a federal boat dock was built there in the early 1950s. The excellent fishing and camping near the dock led to the creation of the provincial park in 1961.

The Manitoba Highway 10 reached Bakers Narrows in 1951 and the airport was opened in 1968.
