= Midwest Canadian Shield Forests =

Taiga ecoregion of Canada

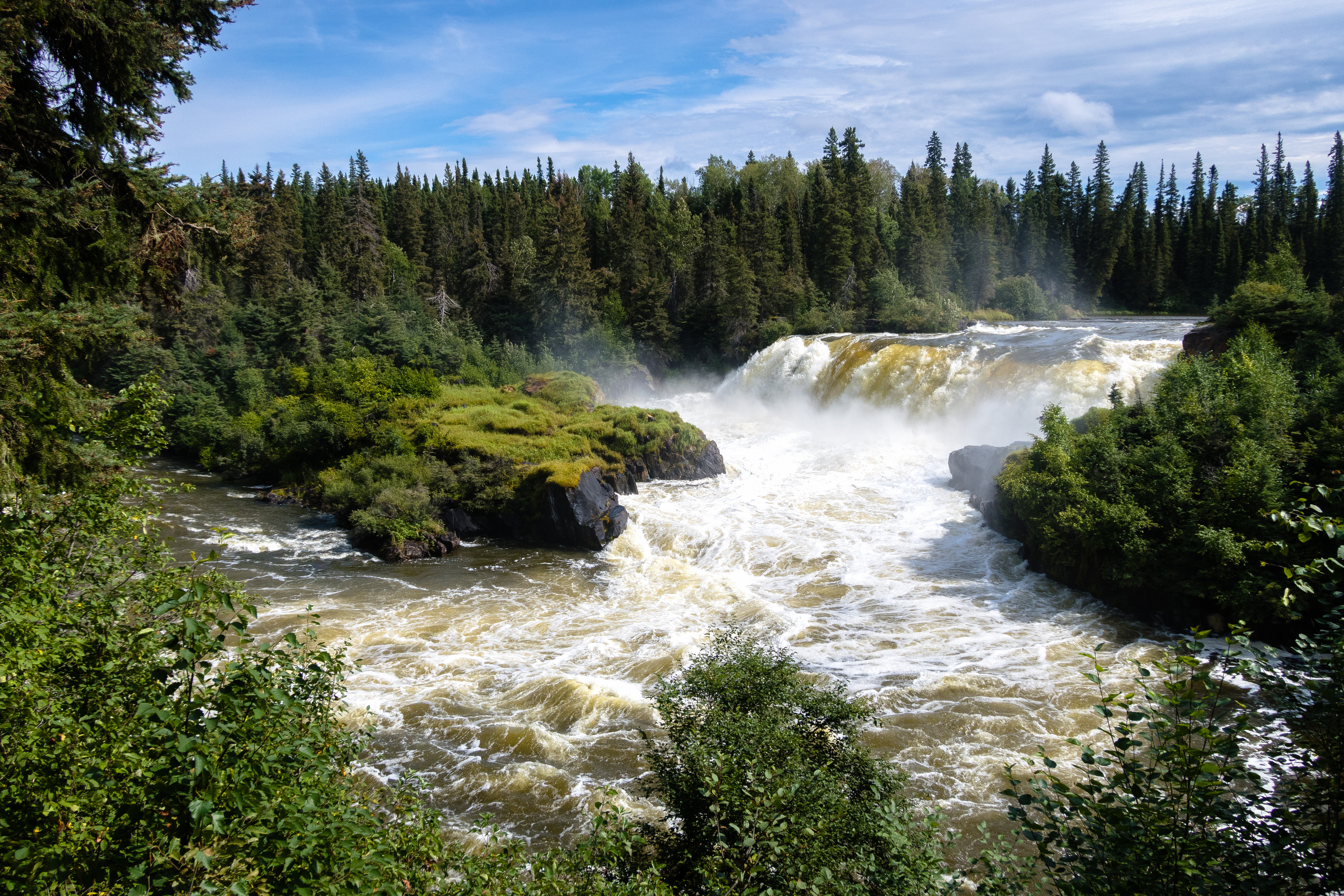
- Forests of the Pisew Falls Provincial Park, Manitoba

Ecology
- Realm: Nearctic
- Biome: Boreal forests/taiga
- Borders: List: Central Canadian Shield forests; Mid-Continental Canadian forests; Northern Canadian Shield taiga; Southern Hudson Bay taiga; Western Great Lakes forests

Geography
- Area: 755,470 km^{2} (291,690 sq mi)
- Country: Canada
- Province: Alberta; Manitoba; Saskatchewan

Conservation
- Conservation status: Vulnerable

The Midwest Canadian Shield Forests is an ecoregion in Canada, classified as a Taiga and Boreal Forests Biome.

== Setting ==
This is an area of rolling hills with lakes both small and large, wetlands, and rocky outcrops on the Canadian Shield in northern Saskatchewan, north-central Manitoba (north and east of Lake Winnipeg) and Northwestern Ontario. Specific areas include the Athabasca Sand Dunes, and many lakes such as Cree Lake, Upper Foster Lake and Reindeer Lake in Saskatchewan. The area has a cold climate, very cold in winter although the hills around Lac Seul are warmer and wetter than most of the ecoregion, while the Athabasca Plain and the uplands above the Churchill River and Hayes River are cooler. There are patches of permafrost throughout

== Flora ==
Much of the landscape, including the Athabasca Plain, is the boreal forest that covers so much of Canada at this latitude, consisting of black spruce (Picea mariana), jack pine (Pinus banksiana), quaking aspen (Populus tremuloides), white birch (Betula papyrifera), balsam poplars, white spruce (Picea glauca), and balsam fir (Abies balsamea). The dominant tree of the wetlands is black spruce, while the rocky outcrops are covered with lichens.

== Fauna ==
Mammals of the ecoregion include moose (Alces alces), American black bear (Ursus americanus), woodland caribou (Rangifer tarandus caribou), barren-ground caribou (Rangifer tarandus arcticus), Canada lynx (Lynx canadensis), grey wolf (Canis lupus), American beaver (Castor canadensis), North American river otter (Lontra canadensis), American marten (Martes americana), American ermine (Mustela richardsonii), fisher (Martes pennanti), muskrat (Ondatra zibethica), snowshoe hare (Lepus americanus), southern red-backed vole (Myodes gapperi), American red squirrel (Tamiasciurus hudsonicus) and least chipmunk (neotamius minimus).

Birds include ducks, geese, American white pelican (Pelecanus erythrorhynchos), sandhill crane (Grus canadensis), spruce grouse (Falcipennis canadensis), sharp-tailed grouse (Tympahuchus phasianellus), willow grouse (Lagopus lagopus), common nighthawk (Chordeiles minor), red-tailed hawk (Buteo jamaicensis), common raven (Corvus corax), common loon (Gavia immer), bald eagle (Haliaeetus leucocephalus), Canada jay (Perisoreus canadensis), northern hawk owl (Surnia ulula), great horned owl (Bubo virginianus), American herring gull (Larus smithsonianus) and double-crested cormorant (Phalacrocorax auritus).

== Threats and preservation ==
Most of the natural forest remains intact with most alteration having occurred in Manitoba due to logging, mining and hydro-electric power generation. Protected areas include Opasquia Provincial Park, Woodland Caribou Provincial Park and Pipestone River Provincial Park in northwestern Ontario, Atikaki Provincial Wilderness Park in eastern Manitoba and Lac la Ronge and Athabasca Sand Dunes Provincial Park in Saskatchewan.

== See also ==
- List of ecoregions in Canada (WWF)
