= Muskeg =

Bog-like ecosystem common in Arctic and boreal areas

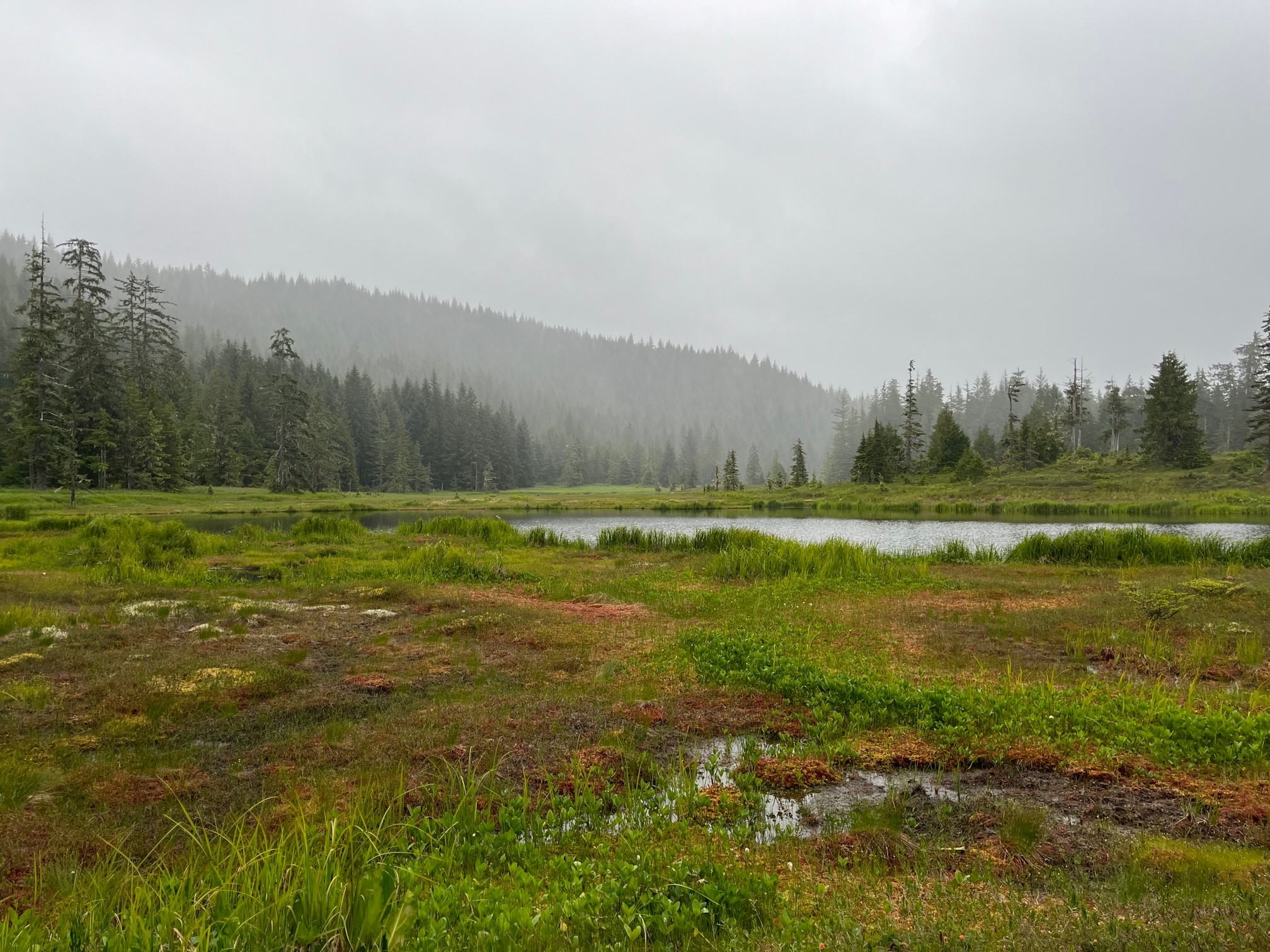
Muskeg in Tongass National Forest

Muskeg (Ojibwe: mashkiig; Cree: maskēk; French: fondrière de mousse, lit. moss bog) is a peat-forming ecosystem found in several northern climates, most commonly in Arctic and boreal areas. Muskeg is approximately synonymous with bog or peatland, and is a standard term in Canada and Alaska. The term became common in these areas because it is of Cree origin, maskēk (ᒪᐢᑫᐠ) meaning "low-lying marsh".

Muskeg consists of organic material in various states of decomposition (as peat), ranging from fairly intact sphagnum moss, to sedge peat, to highly decomposed humus. Pieces of wood can make up five to fifteen percent of the peat soil. The water table tends to be near the surface. The sphagnum moss forming it can hold fifteen to thirty times its own weight in water, which allows the spongy wet muskeg to also form on sloping ground.

Muskeg patches are ideal habitats for beavers, pitcher plants, agaric mushrooms and a variety of other organisms.

== Composition ==
Muskeg forms because permafrost, clay or bedrock prevents water drainage. The water from rain and snow collects, forming permanently waterlogged vegetation and stagnant pools. Muskeg is wet, acidic, and relatively infertile, which prevents large trees from growing, although stunted shore pine, cottonwood, some species of willow, and black spruce are typically found in these habitats. It needs two conditions to develop: abundant rain and cool summers. A dead plant that falls on dry soil is normally attacked by bacteria and fungi and quickly rots. If the same plant lands in water or on saturated soil, it decomposes differently. Less oxygen is available under water, so aerobic bacteria and fungi fail to colonize the submerged debris effectively. In addition, cool temperatures stunt bacterial and fungal growth. This causes slow decomposition, and thus the plant debris gradually accumulates to form peat and eventually muskeg. Depending on the underlying topography of the land, muskeg can reach depths greater than 30 metres (100 ft).

== Description ==
Although, at first glance, muskeg resembles a plain covered with short grasses, a closer look reveals a bizarre and almost unearthly landscape. Small stands of stunted (often-dead) trees, which vaguely resemble natural bonsai, grow where land protrudes above the water table, with small pools of water (stained dark red) scattered about. Its grassland appearance invites the unwary to tread on it; however, even the most solid muskeg is spongy and waterlogged. Traveling through muskeg is a strange and dangerous experience, for the unaccustomed. Muskeg can grow atop bodies of water, especially small ponds and streams. Because of the water beneath, the muskeg surface sometimes moves and ripples underfoot. Thinner patches can collapse under significant weight, and cause larger animals to fall-through and become trapped underneath, drowning if an escape route is not found. Moose are at a particular disadvantage, with their preferred diet of aquatic plants and grasses possibly drawing them dangerously near to muskeg; due to their long legs, minimal hoof area, and great weight, they are at great risk of falling and drowning. Hunters and hikers may occasionally encounter young moose in muskeg-covered ponds submerged up to their torsos or necks, having been unaware of the unstable ground.

== Surface strength ==
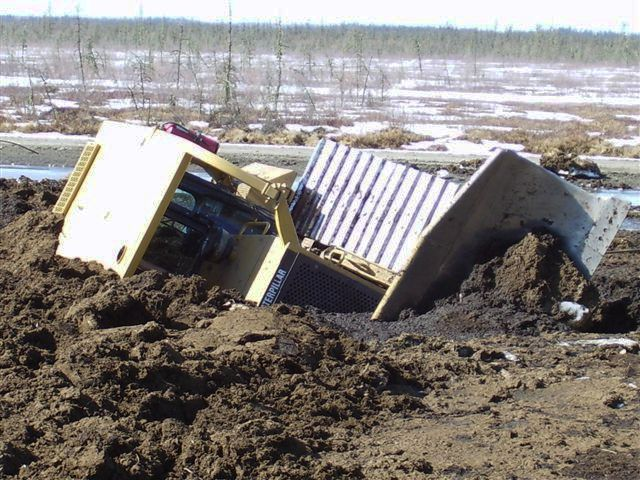
Heavy equipment that has broken through thawing muskeg in Wabasca oil field, Alberta

Muskeg can be a significant impediment to transportation. Legend holds that during the 1870s, muskeg in Northern Ontario swallowed a train and a thousand feet of track whole when a track was accidentally laid on muskeg.

Many other instances have been reported of heavy construction equipment vanishing into muskeg in the spring as the frozen muskeg beneath the vehicle thawed. Construction in muskeg-laden areas sometimes requires the complete removal of the soil and filling with gravel. If the muskeg is not completely cleared to bedrock, its high water content will cause buckling and distortion from winter freezing, much like permafrost.

One method of working atop muskeg is to place large logs on the ground, covered with a thick layer of clay or other stable material. This is commonly called a corduroy road. To increase the effectiveness of the corduroy, prevent erosion, and allow removal of material with less disturbance to the muskeg, a geotextile fabric is sometimes placed down before the logs. However temporary winter access roads on muskeg (ice road), created by clearing the insulating snow and allowing the muskeg to freeze, are more commonly used as they are cheaper to construct and easier to decommission. Water is often sprayed on these roads to thicken the ice allowing heavy trucks and equipment to safely reach remote sites in the winter.

== In fiction ==
In Jack London's short story, "Love of Life," the starving protagonist eats muskeg berries along the trail. "A muskeg berry is a bit of seed enclosed in a bit of water. In the mouth the water melts away and the seed chews sharp and bitter. The man knew there was no nourishment in the berries, but he chewed them patiently with a hope greater than knowledge and defying experience."

In Martha Ostenso's novel Wild Geese, the land owned and beloved by the antagonist plays an important role: "Southeast, under the ridge, bottomless and foul, lay the muskeg, the sore to Caleb's eye. In the heat of summer it gave up sickly vapours in which clouds of mosquitoes rose. Cattle and horses, breaking through the pasture fence and heading for the hay field, had disappeared beneath its spongy surface." (p. 12)

In Rick Riordan's novel The Son of Neptune (in the Heroes of Olympus series), Percy Jackson steps off a path near Seward, Alaska, and falls through the muskeg. He would have drowned if another character, Hazel Levesque, had not jumped in after him. Frank Zhang, the third of their trio, pulled them out using his bow, with Hazel holding onto it and Percy holding onto her ankles.

== Gallery ==
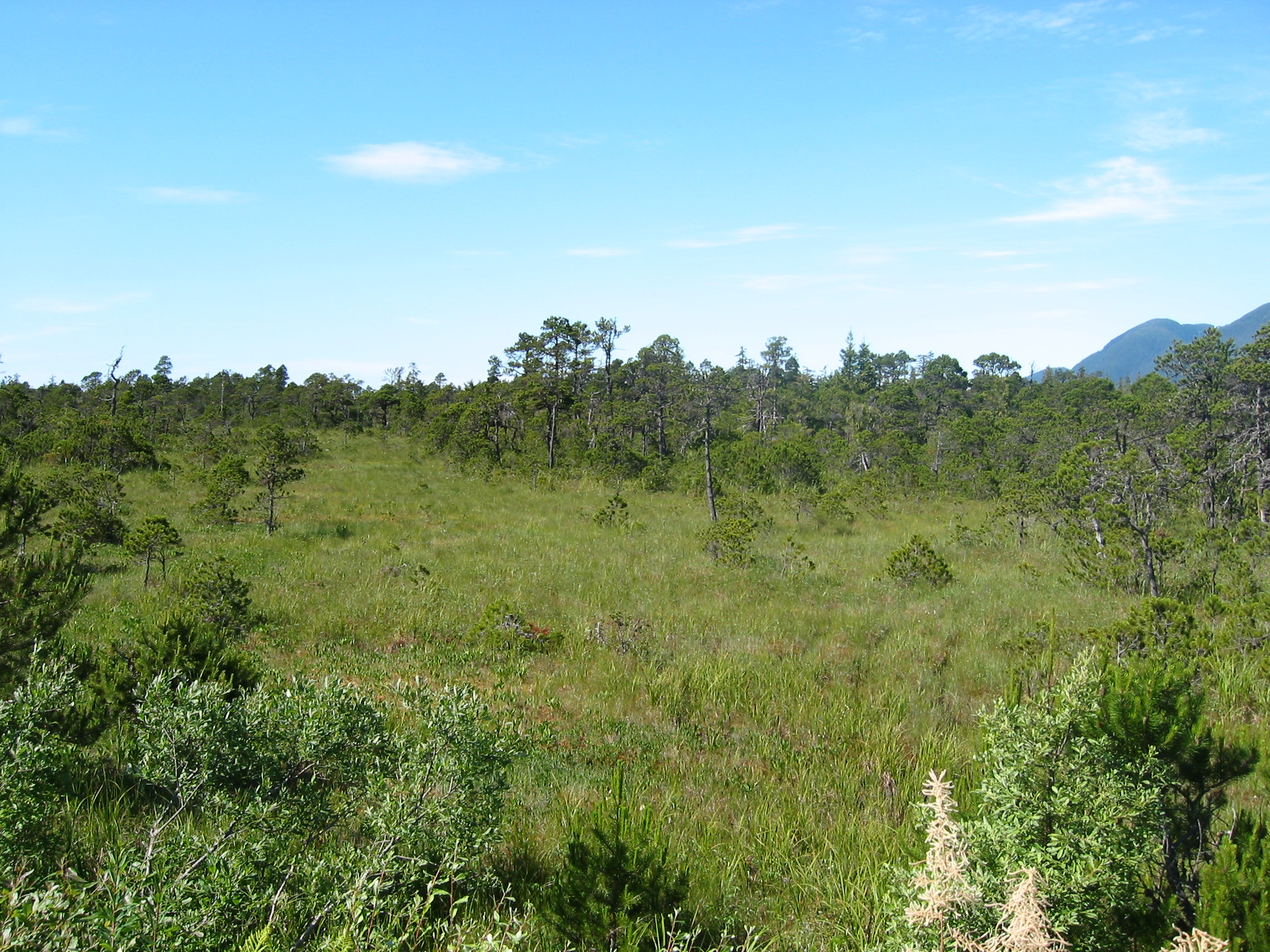
Stunted shore pine growing on muskeg in Wrangell, Alaska

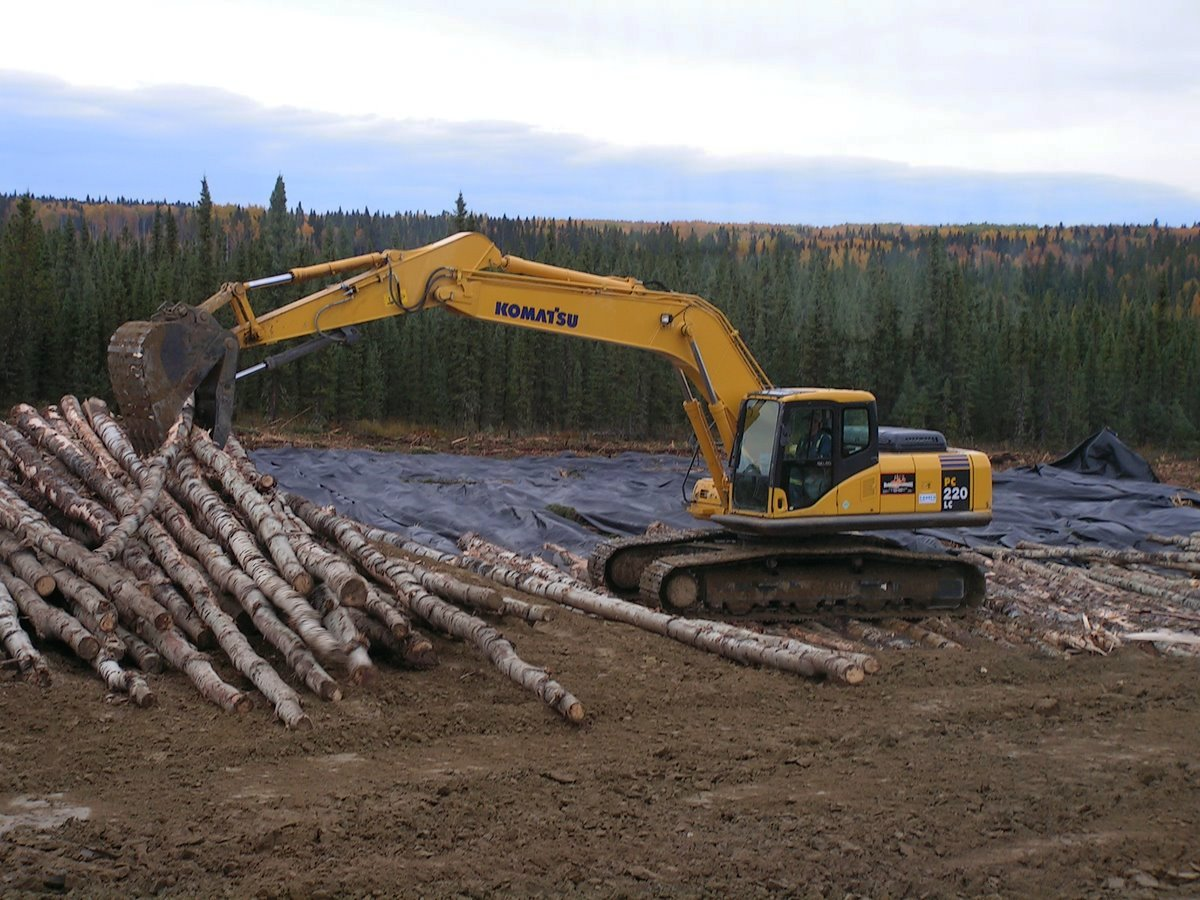
Tracked excavator placing corduroy on muskeg near Rocky Mountain House, Alberta

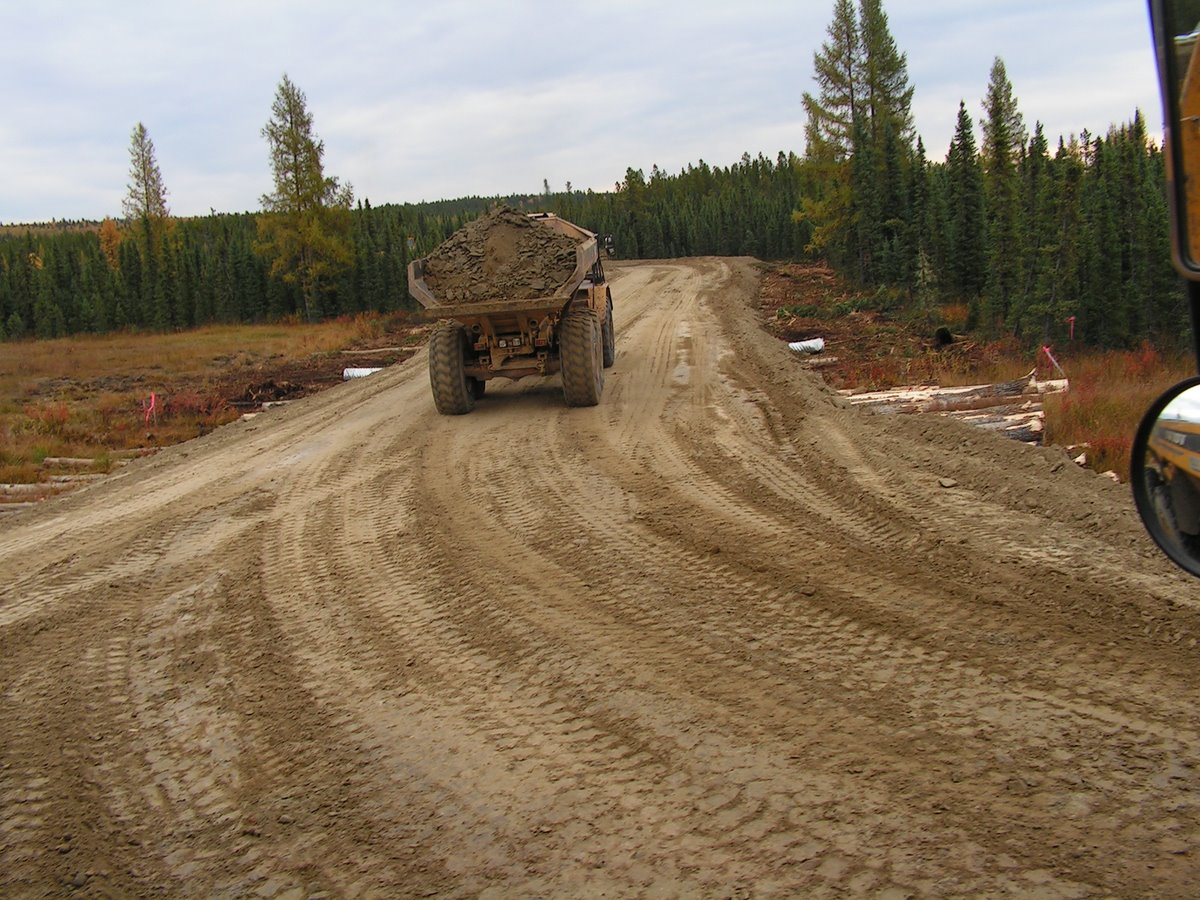
Caterpillar D300E hauling on a corduroy road built over muskeg

== Sources ==
- C. Michael Hogan. 2008. Black Spruce: Picea mariana, GlobalTwitcher.com, ed. Nicklas Stromberg, November, 2008
- "What on Earth is Muskeg?". Forest Facts. Tongass National Forest. 25 August 2000. Archived from the original on 14 January 2012.
