= Aswapiswanan Lake =

Lake in Manitoba, Canada

- Location of the lake in Manitoba Aswapiswanan Lake (Canada)
- Location: Census Division No. 22 - Thompson-North Central, Northern Region, Manitoba
- Coordinates: 54°28′23″N 95°23′48″W
- Primary inflows: Hungry River, Porcupine Creek, Bolton River, Joint River
- Primary outflows: Mink River
- Basin countries: Canada
- Max. length: 22 km (14 mi)
- Max. width: 2.6 km (1.6 mi)
- Surface elevation: 186 m (610 ft)

Aswapiswanan Lake is a lake in the Hayes River drainage basin in Census Division No. 22 - Thompson-North Central, Northern Region, Manitoba, Canada. The lake is about 22 kilometres (14 mi) long and 2.6 kilometres (1.6 mi) wide and lies at an elevation of 186 metres (610 ft). The primary inflows from west to east are the Hungry River, Porcupine Creek, the Bolton River and the Joint River. The primary outflow is the Mink River. The lake's waters eventually flow into Gods Lake, and via the Gods River and the Hayes River into Hudson Bay.

== See also ==
- List of lakes of Manitoba
