= Mink River (Manitoba) =

- Location of the mouth of the Mink River in Manitoba

Location
- Country: Canada
- Province: Manitoba
- Region: Northern
- Census Division: No. 22 - Thompson-North Central

Physical characteristics
- Source: Aswapiswanan Lake
  - coordinates: 54°27′46″N 95°15′50″W
  - elevation: 186 m (610 ft)
- Mouth: Touchwood Lake
  - coordinates: 54°29′52″N 95°07′08″W
  - elevation: 184 m (604 ft)
- Length: 14.7 km (9.1 mi)

Basin features
- River system: Hudson Bay drainage basin
- Tributaries
  - left: Unnamed river from Colen Lakes

The Mink River is a river in the Hudson Bay drainage basin in Census Division No. 22 - Thompson-North Central, Northern Region, Manitoba, Canada. It is about 14.7 kilometres (9.1 mi) long and begins at Aswapiswanan Lake at an elevation of 186 metres (610 ft). The river takes in one significant tributary, an unnamed river from the Colen Lakes, from the left at 54°29′57″N 95°13′06″W before emptying into Touchwood Lake at an elevation of 184 metres (604 ft). The Mink River's waters eventually flow into Gods Lake, and via the Gods River and the Hayes River into Hudson Bay.

== See also ==
- List of rivers of Manitoba
