= Onigam Lake =

- Location of Onigam Lake in Ontario.
- Location: Kenora, Ontario, Canada
- Coordinates: 55°21′39″N 90°33′28″W
- Type: Lake
- Part of: Hudson Bay drainage basin
- Basin countries: Canada
- Max. length: 6.5 km (4.0 mi)
- Max. width: 0.4 km (0.25 mi)
- Surface elevation: 93 m (305 ft)

Onigam Lake is a lake in the Hudson Bay drainage basin in Unorganized Kenora District in Northwestern Ontario, Canada. It is about 6.5 kilometres (4.0 mi) long and .4 kilometres (0.2 mi) wide, and lies at an elevation of 93 metres (305 ft). The primary outflow is an unnamed river at the west, which flows downstream through an unnamed lake a total distance of 5.8 kilometres (3.6 mi) to the Sturgeon River at 55°21′09″N 90°41′54″W, about 5.3 kilometres (3.3 mi) upstream from Sturgeon Lake. The Sturgeon River flows via the Echoing River and the Hayes River to Hudson Bay.

== See also ==
- List of lakes in Ontario
