= Bolton River (Manitoba) =

- Location of the mouth of the Bolton River in Manitoba.

Location
- Country: Canada
- Province: Manitoba
- Region: Northern
- Census Division: No. 22 - Thompson-North Central

Physical characteristics
- Source: Musketasonan Lake
  - coordinates: 53°58′48″N 96°35′25″W
  - elevation: 249 m (817 ft)
- Mouth: Aswapiswanan Lake
  - coordinates: 54°28′05″N 95°27′47″W
  - elevation: 186 m (610 ft)
- Length: 115 km (71 mi)

Basin features
- River system: Hudson Bay drainage basin
- Tributaries
  - right: Nikik River

The Bolton River is a river in the Hudson Bay drainage basin in Census Division No. 22 - Thompson-North Central, Northern Region, Manitoba, Canada. It is about 115 kilometres (71 mi) long and begins at Musketasonan Lake, about 20 kilometres (12 mi) south of Molson Lake, at an elevation of 249 metres (817 ft). It flows northeast through Little Bolton Lake at an elevation of 224 metres (735 ft), Rushforth Lake at an elevation of 218 metres (715 ft), Bolton Lake at an elevation of 212 metres (696 ft), where it takes in the right tributary Nikik River, and Kakwusis Lake at an elevation of 208 metres (682 ft). The river continues northeast over the twin Kasukwapiskechewak Rapids, then over the twin Kakwu Rapids, and empties into Aswapiswanan Lake at an elevation of 186 metres (610 ft), about 60 kilometres (37 mi) west southwest of the community of Gods Lake Narrows. The Bolton River's waters eventually flow into Gods Lake, and via the Gods River and the Hayes River into Hudson Bay.

== See also ==
- List of rivers of Manitoba
