= Rushforth Lake =

Lake in Manitoba, Canada

- Location of the lake in Manitoba Rushforth Lake (Canada)
- Location: Census Division No. 22 - Thompson-North Central, Northern Region, Manitoba
- Coordinates: 54°12′29″N 96°03′07″W
- Primary inflows: Bolton River
- Primary outflows: Bolton River
- Basin countries: Canada
- Max. length: 11 km (6.8 mi)
- Max. width: 1.4 km (0.87 mi)
- Surface elevation: 218 m (715 ft)

Rushforth Lake is a lake in the Hayes River drainage basin in Census Division No. 22 - Thompson-North Central, Northern Region, Manitoba, Canada. The lake is about 11 kilometres (6.8 mi) long and 1.4 kilometres (0.9 mi) wide and lies at an elevation of 218 metres (715 ft). The primary inflow and outflow is the Bolton River, whose waters eventually flow into Gods Lake, and via the Gods River and the Hayes River into Hudson Bay. The lake is named for Flying Officer William John Henry Rushforth of the Royal Canadian Air Force, who was born and raised in Eriksdale, Manitoba. Officer Rushforth's plane was shot down over France in 1944.

== See also ==
- List of lakes of Manitoba
