= Wolf River (Manitoba) =

- Location of the mouth of the Wolf River in Manitoba

Location
- Country: Canada
- Province: Manitoba
- Region: Census division No. 22

Physical characteristics
- Source: Hawkins Lake
  - coordinates: 54°44′36″N 94°43′20″W
  - elevation: 186 m (610 ft)
- Mouth: Knee Lake on the Hayes River
  - coordinates: 54°54′40″N 94°40′40″W
  - elevation: 175 m (574 ft)
- Length: 21 km (13 mi)

Basin features
- River system: Hudson Bay drainage basin

The Wolf River is a river in census division No. 22 in Manitoba, Canada. It is in the Hudson Bay drainage basin and is a right tributary of the Hayes River.

== Course ==
The river begins at Hawkins Lake and heads northeast to Bayly Lake. From Bayley Lake, one can make a short portage east to Bayly Bay on Gods Lake, source of the Gods River. The Wolf River then heads north to Fishing Eagle Lake, then turns west and reaches its mouth on the east side of Knee Lake. Knee Lake empties via the Hayes River to Hudson Bay. Knee Lake Airport and Knee Lake Water Aerodrome are 8 kilometres (5.0 mi) and 8.5 kilometres (5.3 mi) from the river mouth respectively on the opposite shore of Knee Lake

== See also ==
- List of rivers of Manitoba
