= Kakwusis Lake =

Lake in Manitoba, Canada

- Location of the lake in Manitoba Kakwusis Lake (Canada)
- Location: Census Division No. 22 - Thompson-North Central, Northern Region, Manitoba
- Coordinates: 54°22′24″N 95°35′09″W
- Primary inflows: Bolton River
- Primary outflows: Bolton River
- Basin countries: Canada
- Max. length: 3.6 km (2.2 mi)
- Max. width: 1.6 km (0.99 mi)
- Surface elevation: 208 m (682 ft)

Kakwusis Lake is a lake in the Hayes River drainage basin in Census Division No. 22 - Thompson-North Central, Northern Region, Manitoba, Canada. The lake is about 3.6 kilometres (2.2 mi) long and 1.6 kilometres (1.0 mi) wide and lies at an elevation of 208 metres (682 ft). The primary inflow and outflow is the Bolton River, whose waters eventually flow into Gods Lake, and via the Gods River and the Hayes River into Hudson Bay.

== See also ==
- List of lakes of Manitoba
