= Musketasonan Lake =

Lake in Manitoba, Canada

- Location of the lake in Manitoba Musketasonan Lake (Canada)
- Location: Census Division No. 22 - Thompson-North Central, Northern Region, Manitoba
- Coordinates: 53°58′10″N 96°37′01″W
- Primary outflows: Bolton River
- Basin countries: Canada
- Max. length: 4.5 km (2.8 mi)
- Max. width: 1.6 km (0.99 mi)
- Surface elevation: 249 m (817 ft)

Musketasonan Lake is a lake in the Hayes River drainage basin in Census Division No. 22 - Thompson-North Central, Northern Region, Manitoba, Canada. The lake is about 4.5 kilometres (2.8 mi) long and 1.6 kilometres (1.0 mi) wide and lies at an elevation of 249 metres (817 ft). It is the source of the Bolton River, whose waters eventually flow into Gods Lake, and via the Gods River and the Hayes River into Hudson Bay.

== See also ==
- List of lakes of Manitoba
