= Vermilyea Lake =

Lake in Manitoba, Canada

- Location of the lake in Manitoba Vermilyea Lake (Canada)
- Location: Census Division No. 22 - Thompson-North Central, Northern Region, Manitoba
- Coordinates: 54°31′38″N 94°46′51″W
- Primary inflows: Channel from Touchwood Lake
- Primary outflows: Wesachewan River
- Basin countries: Canada
- Max. length: 9.3 km (5.8 mi)
- Max. width: 2.6 km (1.6 mi)
- Surface elevation: 184 m (604 ft)
- Settlements: None

Vermilyea Lake is a lake in the Hayes River drainage basin in Census Division No. 22 — Thompson-North Central, Northern Region, Manitoba, Canada. It is shaped like the letter "L" on its side, is about 9.3 kilometres (5.8 mi) long and 8.2 kilometres (5.1 mi) wide, and lies at an elevation of 184 metres (604 ft). The primary inflow is a channel from Touchwood Lake, and the primary outflows are the twin channels of the Wesachewan River to Gods Lake. The lake's waters eventually flow via the Gods River and the Hayes River into Hudson Bay.

== See also ==
- List of lakes of Manitoba
