= Wesachewan River =

- Location of the mouth of the Wesachewan River in Manitoba

Location
- Country: Canada
- Province: Manitoba
- Region: Northern
- Census Division: No. 22 - Thompson-North Central

Physical characteristics
- Source: Vermilyea Lake
  - coordinates: 54°31′01″N 94°44′48″W
  - elevation: 184 m (604 ft)
- 2nd source: Vermilyea Lake
  - coordinates: 54°31′00″N 94°45′33″W
  - elevation: 184 m (604 ft)
- Mouth: Gods Lake
  - coordinates: 54°30′07″N 94°43′32″W
  - elevation: 178 m (584 ft)
- Length: 2.5 km (1.6 mi)

Basin features
- River system: Hudson Bay drainage basin

The Wesachewan River is a short river in the Hudson Bay drainage basin in census division No. 22 (Thompson-North Central) of Northern Manitoba, Canada.

It flows 2.5 kilometres (1.6 mi) out of Vermilyea Lake via twin channels which combine at 54°30′31″N 94°44′28″W, then flows over the Namaykos Rapids, and empties into Wesachewan Bay on Gods Lake. The main channel from Vermilyea Lake is the east channel (given here as the primary source in the Infobox on the right), which is straighter and 1.8 kilometres (1.1 mi) shorter than its twin (1.25 km or 0.78 mi versus 3.05 km or 1.90 mi) than the west channel (given here as the secondary source). The length of the river given in the Infobox is the length using the shorter east channel.

The river's waters eventually flow via the Gods River and the Hayes River into Hudson Bay.

== See also ==
- List of rivers of Manitoba
