= Bolton Lake (Manitoba) =

Lake in Manitoba, Canada

- Location of the lake in Manitoba Bolton Lake (Canada)
- Location: Census Division No. 22 - Thompson-North Central, Northern Region, Manitoba
- Coordinates: 54°16′00″N 95°47′00″W
- Primary inflows: Bolton River, Nikik River
- Primary outflows: Bolton River
- Basin countries: Canada
- Max. length: 19 km (12 mi)
- Max. width: 19 km (12 mi)
- Surface elevation: 212 m (696 ft)

Bolton Lake is a lake in the Hayes River drainage basin in Census Division No. 22 - Thompson-North Central, Northern Region, Manitoba, Canada. The lake is at an elevation of 212 metres (696 ft); the main body of the lake is about 15 kilometres (9.3 mi) long and 8 kilometres (5.0 mi) wide, but an arm extends a further 11 kilometres (6.8 mi) for a total width of 19 km as well. The primary inflows are the Bolton River from the west and the Nikik River from the south, and the primary outflow is Bolton River, whose waters eventually flow into and the Hayes River into Hudson Bay.

== See also ==
- List of lakes of Manitoba
