= Touchwood Lake (Manitoba) =

Lake in Manitoba, Canada

- Location of the lake in Manitoba Touchwood Lake (Canada)
- Location: Census Division No. 22 - Thompson-North Central, Northern Region, Manitoba
- Coordinates: 54°28′45″N 94°59′45″W
- Primary inflows: Mink River, Wanless Creek, Wapawukaw River
- Primary outflows: Channel to Vermilyea Lake
- Basin countries: Canada
- Max. length: 20.9 km (13.0 mi)
- Max. width: 4.4 km (2.7 mi)
- Surface elevation: 184 m (604 ft)

Touchwood Lake is a lake in the Hayes River drainage basin in Census Division No. 22 - Thompson-North Central, Northern Region, Manitoba, Canada. The lake is about 20.9 kilometres (13.0 mi) long and 4.4 kilometres (2.7 mi) wide and lies at an elevation of 184 metres (604 ft). The primary inflows (clockwise from the northwest) are the Mink River, Wanless Creek, and the Wapawukaw River, and the primary outflow is a channel to Vermilyea Lake. The lake's waters eventually flow into Gods Lake, and via the Gods River and the Hayes River into Hudson Bay.

== See also ==
- List of lakes of Manitoba
