= Molson (disambiguation) =

Molson is a former brewing company and the brand name of its beer.

Molson may also refer to:

== Related to the brewing company ==
- Molson family, a Canadian family that has been influential in business and politics
- Molson Coors Beverage Company, the company that currently owns the Molson brand
- Molson Bank, a former Canadian bank

- Molson Bank Building, its headquarters in Montreal

- Molson Stadium, a stadium in Montreal
- Molson Cup, an ice hockey trophy
- Molson Amphitheatre, a concert hall in Toronto
- Molson Prize, an arts prize
- Barrie Molson Centre, an arena
- Molson, Washington, a mining town named for John W. Molson
- Molson Canadian Rocks for Toronto, a benefit concert
- John Molson School of Business at Concordia University
- Molson Centre, former name of Montreal's main arena (renamed Bell Centre)

== Other uses ==
- Hugh Molson, Baron Molson, British MP and Peer
- Mark Molson, American bridge player
- Molson Lake (Manitoba)
- Molson Lake Airport

== See also ==
- Molson Indy (disambiguation), a series of automobile races
