= Vermilyea =

Vermilyea is a surname of French origin.

== People ==
- Kristen Vermilyea (born 1969), American actress
- Jamie Vermilyea (born 1982), American baseball player

== Places ==
- Vermilyea Lake, lake in Manitoba, Canada

== Fictional Characters ==
- Adam Vermilyea, a fictional character in the anime Gundam SEED DESTINY
