= Sturgeon River (Manitoba) =

- Location of the mouth of the Sturgeon River in Manitoba

Location
- Country: Canada
- Provinces: Manitoba; Ontario

Physical characteristics
- Source
  - location: Unorganized Kenora District, Northwestern Ontario
  - coordinates: 55°25′42″N 90°02′09″W
  - elevation: 119 m (390 ft)
- Mouth: Echoing River
  - location: Northern Region, Manitoba
  - coordinates: 55°31′20″N 91°22′43″W
  - elevation: 86 m (282 ft)
- Length: 105 km (65 mi)

Basin features
- River system: Hudson Bay drainage basin
- Tributaries
  - right: Hayhurst River

The Sturgeon River is a river in the Hudson Bay drainage basin in Manitoba and Ontario, Canada. It flows west from its source in Unorganized Kenora District, Northwestern Ontario, through Sturgeon Lake, and takes in the right tributary Hayhurst River just before reaching its mouth at the Echoing River in Northern Region, Manitoba. The Echoing River flows via the Gods River and the Hayes River to Hudson Bay.

== See also ==
- List of rivers of Manitoba
- List of rivers of Ontario
