= Leslie Creek =

Leslie Creek may refer to:

- Leslie Creek (Manitoba), a stream in Canada
- Leslie Creek (Nine Partners Creek), a stream in the U.S. state of Pennsylvania
