= Pasquatchai River =

- Location of the mouth of the Pasquatchai River in Manitoba just beyond the border with Ontario

Location
- Country: Canada
- Provinces: Manitoba; Ontario

Physical characteristics
- Source: Unnamed lake
  - location: Kenora District, Northwestern Ontario
  - coordinates: 54°39′47″N 91°44′38″W
  - elevation: 185 m (607 ft)
- Mouth: Echoing River
  - location: Census Division No. 23, Northern Region, Manitoba
  - coordinates: 55°14′42″N 91°31′19″W
  - elevation: 90 m (300 ft)
- Length: 115 km (71 mi)

Basin features
- River system: Hudson Bay drainage basin

The Pasquatchai River is a river in the Hudson Bay drainage basin in Kenora District, Northwestern Ontario, and census Division No. 23, Northern Region, Manitoba, Canada.

== Course ==
With the exception of the final 200 metres (656 ft) to its mouth at the Echoing River, the Pasquatchai River lies entirely in Ontario.

== See also ==
- List of rivers of Manitoba
- List of rivers of Ontario
