= Touchwood =

Touchwood is decayed wood used for tinder. The phrase "touch wood" is another way of describing knocking on wood. The terms may also refer to:

== Geography in Canada ==
- Touchwood Hills, a range of hills in Saskatchewan
- Rural Municipality of Touchwood No. 248, Saskatchewan
- Touchwood (electoral district) a former provincial electoral district which was merged to create Last Mountain-Touchwood in 1975
- Touchwood Hills Post Provincial Park a provincial park and historic site in Saskatchewan
- Touchwood Lake (Alberta)
- Touchwood Lake (Manitoba)

== Business ==
- Touchwood Pacific Partners, an American film financing partnership founded by The Walt Disney Company
- Touchwood, Solihull, a shopping centre in the West Midlands of England

== Culture ==
- Touch Wood, a 1934 play by English writer Dodie Smith
- Lord and Lady Touchwood, characters in the 1693 play The Double Dealer by English playwright William Congreve
- Mr. Touchwood, a character in the 1823 novel Saint Ronan's Well by Scottish writer Walter Scott
- "Touchwood (Forest Mix)", a song by Tangerine Dream on the 1996 album The Dream Mixes
