= Touchwood Lake =

Touchwood Lake may refer to:

- Touchwood Lake (Alberta), Canada
- Touchwood Lake (Manitoba), Canada
