= Sturgeon Lake (north Kenora District) =

Lake in Kenora District, Ontario, Canada

- Location within Ontario
- Location: Kenora District, Ontario
- Coordinates: 55°23′48″N 90°54′19″W
- Primary inflows: Sturgeon River
- Primary outflows: Sturgeon River
- Basin countries: Canada
- Max. length: 24.4 km (15.2 mi)
- Max. width: 1 km (0.6 mi)
- Surface area: 14 km^{2} (5 sq mi)
- Shore length^{1}: 45 km (28.0 mi)
- Surface elevation: 88 m (289 ft)
- ^{1} Shore length is not a well-defined measure.

Sturgeon Lake is a long, thin lake located in the Kenora District of Northwestern Ontario, Canada, 200 km (124 mi) along the Manitoba-Ontario border from Hudson Bay and 6.5 km (4.0 mi) from the Manitoba border.

The Sturgeon River flows north-west into and out of the lake, and eventually flows into Hudson Bay via the Hayes River.

== See also ==
- List of lakes in Ontario
