= Assean River (Manitoba) =

River in Manitoba, Canada

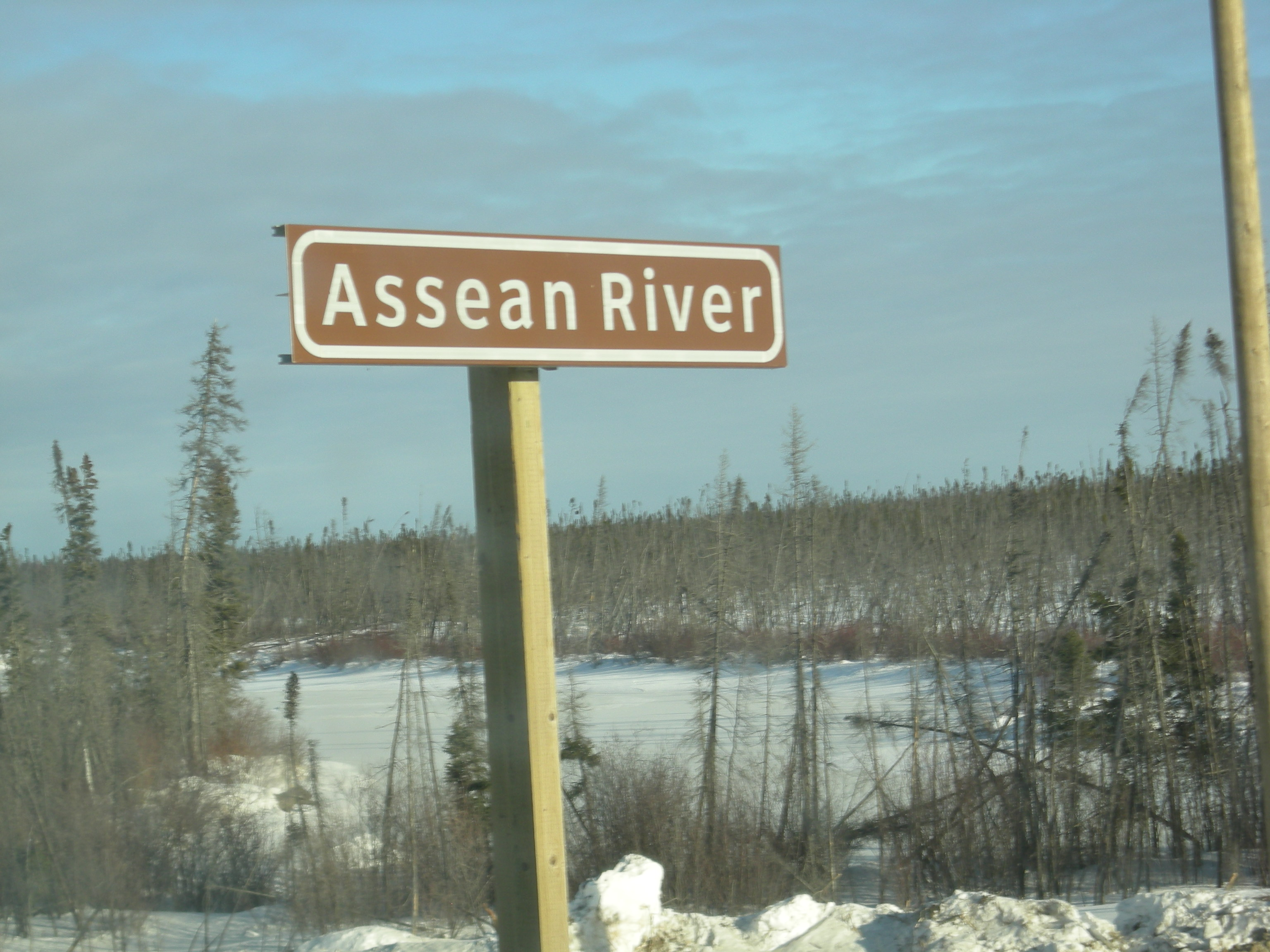
- Road sign for the Assean River

- Location of the mouth of the Assean River Assean River (Manitoba) (Canada)

Location
- Country: Canada
- Province: Manitoba
- Region: Northern

Physical characteristics
- Source: Little Assean Lake
  - coordinates: 56°20′06″N 96°08′34″W
  - elevation: 181 m (594 ft)
- Mouth: Clark Lake on the Nelson River
  - coordinates: 56°17′31″N 95°55′26″W
  - elevation: 167 m (548 ft)

Basin features
- River system: Hudson Bay drainage basin

Assean River is a river in the Hudson Bay drainage basin in Northern Manitoba, Canada. It flows from its source at Little Assean Lake to Clark Lake on the Nelson River.

== See also ==
- List of rivers of Manitoba
