= Sky Pilot Creek (Manitoba) =

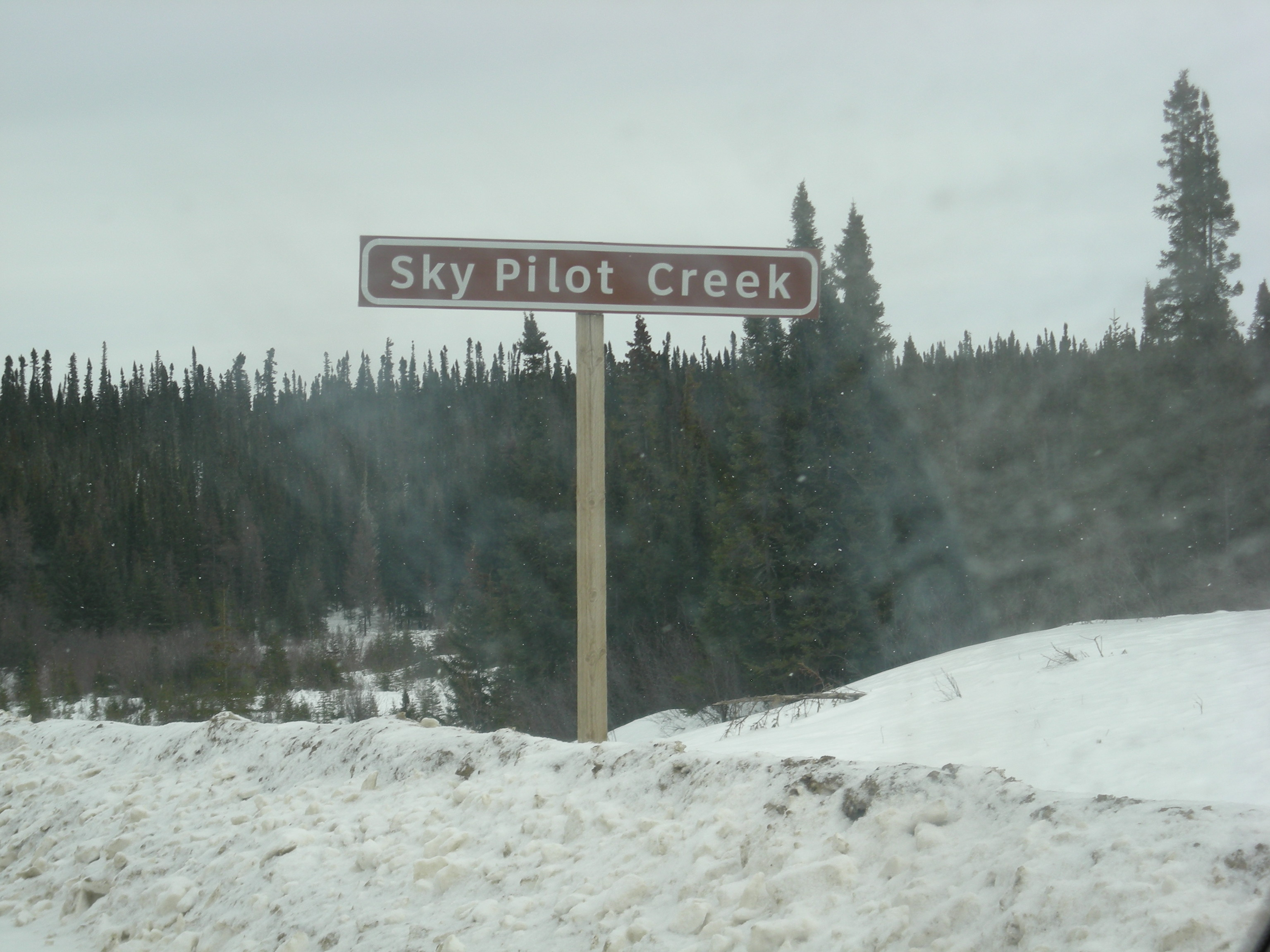
- Road sign for Sky Pilot Creek

- Location of the mouth of Sky Pilot Creek in Manitoba

Location
- Country: Canada
- Province: Manitoba
- Region: Northern

Physical characteristics
- Source: Sky Pilot Lake
  - coordinates: 56°30′24″N 94°50′41″W
  - elevation: 144 m (472 ft)
- Mouth: Nelson River
  - coordinates: 56°24′28″N 94°21′46″W
  - elevation: 90 m (300 ft)

Basin features
- River system: Hudson Bay drainage basin

Sky Pilot Creek is a river in the Hudson Bay drainage basin in Northern Manitoba, Canada. It flows from Sky Pilot Lake to the Nelson River, which it enters as a left tributary immediately downstream of the Long Spruce Generating Station and dam. It passes twice under Manitoba Provincial Road 280: once near its source, and once just before its mouth.

== See also ==
- List of rivers of Manitoba
