= Unorganized Division No. 22, Manitoba =

Coordinates: 54.93°N 95.62°W

Division No. 22, Unorganized, or North Central Manitoba Unorganized, is an unorganized area in northeastern Manitoba. Unlike in some other provinces, census divisions do not reflect the organization of local government in Manitoba. These areas exist solely for the purposes of statistical analysis and presentation; they have no government of their own.

It consists of all of Division No. 22 excluding municipalities and Indian reserves. It has a population of 2,205 as of 2011, and an area of 87,857.61 km^{2}.
