= Tiny Creek (Manitoba) =

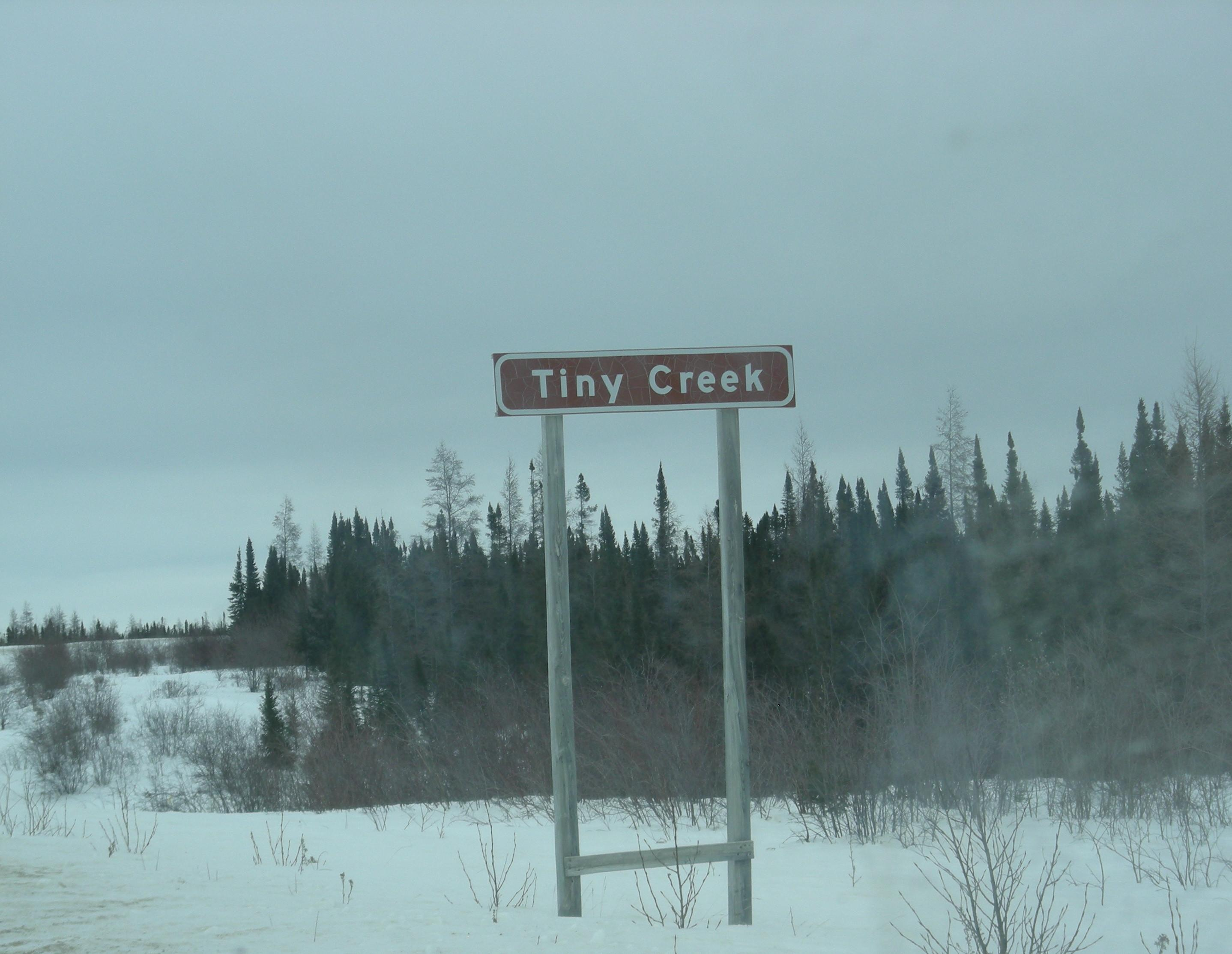
- Road sign for Tiny Creek

- Location of the mouth of Tiny Creek in Manitoba

Location
- Country: Canada
- Province: Manitoba
- Region: Northern

Physical characteristics
- Source: Unnamed lake
  - coordinates: 56°41′14″N 93°58′17″W
  - elevation: 110 m (360 ft)
- Mouth: Nelson River
  - coordinates: 56°38′11″N 93°51′19″W
  - elevation: 35 m (115 ft)

Basin features
- River system: Hudson Bay drainage basin

Tiny Creek is a river in the Hudson Bay drainage basin in Northern Manitoba, Canada. It flows from an unnamed lake to the Nelson River, which it enters as a left tributary just after having passed under Manitoba Provincial Road 290.

== See also ==
- List of rivers of Manitoba
