= Boots Creek (Manitoba) =

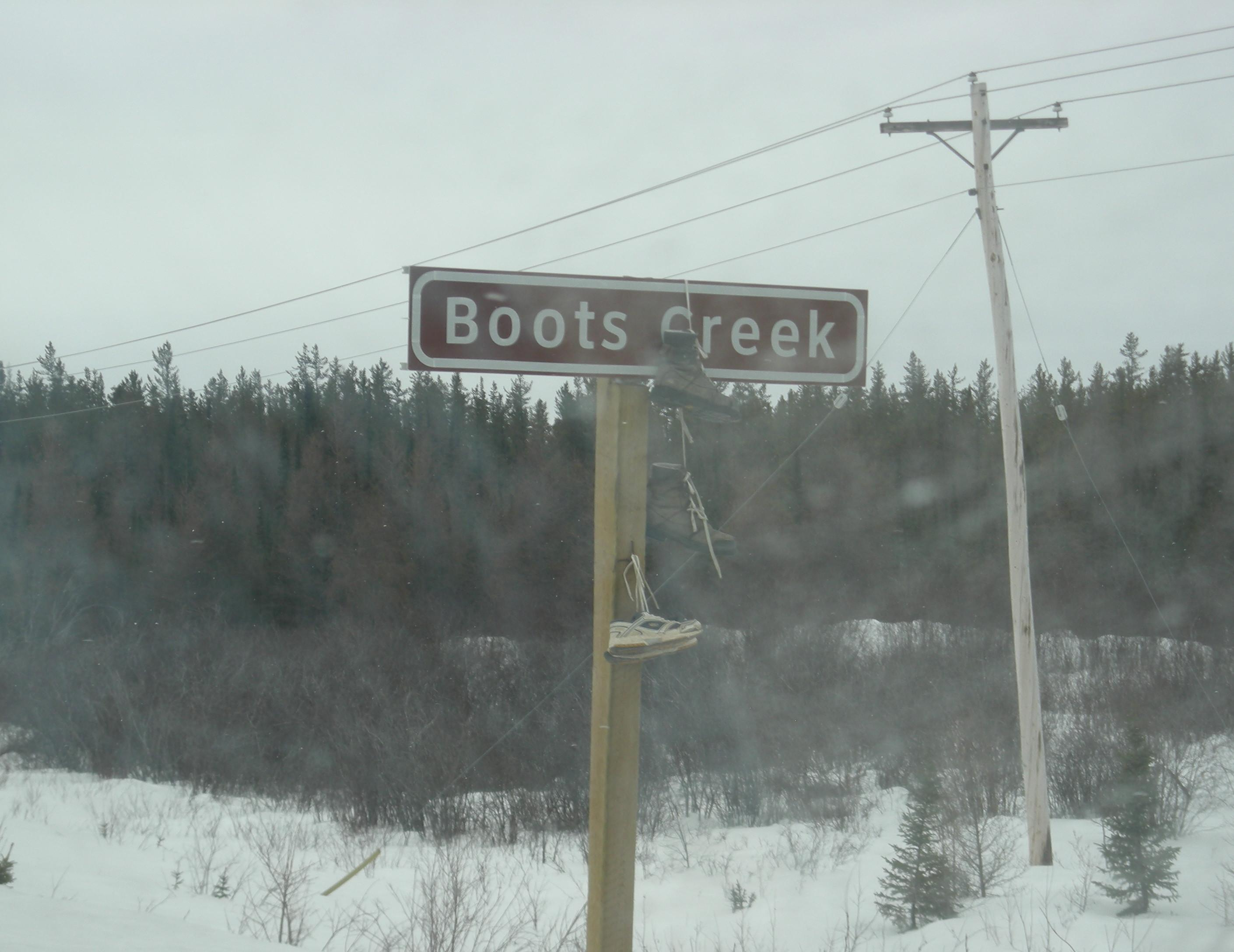
- Sign for Boots Creek, Manitoba

- Location of the mouth of Boots Creek in Manitoba

Location
- Country: Canada
- Province: Manitoba
- Region: Northern

Physical characteristics
- Source: Unnamed lake
  - coordinates: 56°19′46″N 94°12′13″W
  - elevation: 136 m (446 ft)
- Mouth: Nelson River
  - coordinates: 56°22′15″N 94°28′26″W
  - elevation: 108 m (354 ft)

Basin features
- River system: Hudson Bay drainage basin

Boots Creek is a river in the Hudson Bay drainage basin in Northern Manitoba, Canada. It is a right tributary of the Nelson River.

== See also ==
- List of rivers of Manitoba
