= Echimamish River =

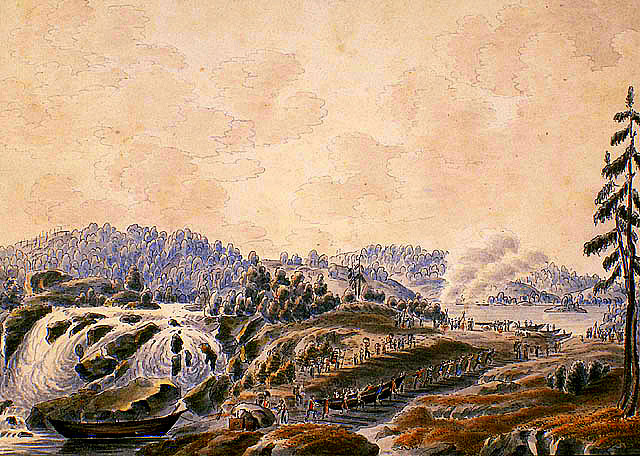

- Location of Echimamish River in Manitoba.

Location
- Country: Canada
- Province: Manitoba
- Region: Northern Region

Physical characteristics
- Source: Hayes River
  - coordinates: 54°22′54″N 96°32′05″W
- Mouth: Nelson River
  - coordinates: 54°19′39″N 97°26′29″W
- Length: 60 km (37 mi)

The Echimamish River is a river bifurcation in Manitoba, Canada. Located 70 kilometres (43 mi) northeast of the northern tip of Lake Winnipeg, it is about 60 kilometres (37 mi) long and runs east–west between the Hayes River and the Nelson River. It flows through nearly flat swampy country and has a barely detectable current. Flowing through peat bogs, the water acquires a dark colour, hence the old name of Blackwater Creek. Since it is shallow canoe navigation is helped by beaver ponds. Morse claims that it flows in two directions from a central beaver pond. On the Echimamish is the Painted Stone Portage. This is not the divide between the two river basins, but a short (20 paces) carry around a shallow and rocky section. The only other obstacles are beaver dams.

== Historic route ==
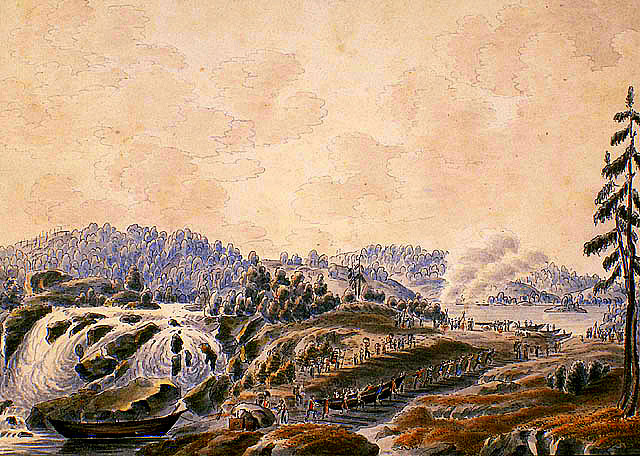
A brigade of York boats at a portage on the voyageur route by Peter Rindisbacher in 1821

The Echimamish was part of the voyageur route from Hudson Bay to Lake Winnipeg. Since most of the Nelson River is difficult, canoe and York boat brigades would take the easier Hayes and use the Echimamish to reach the upper Nelson and Lake Winnipeg. The first European to use the river may have been Joseph Smith in 1757. In 2006, the historic 600-kilometre (370 mi) route from York Factory to Norway House which includes the Hayes River, the Echimamish and a portion of the Nelson River was designated part of the Canadian Heritage Rivers System.

== See also ==
- List of rivers of Manitoba
- Canadian canoe routes
