= Molson Lake (Manitoba) =

Lake in Manitoba, Canada

- Location in Manitoba Molson Lake (Canada)
- Location: Division No. 22, Northern Region, Manitoba
- Coordinates: 54°13′N 96°45′W
- Primary inflows: Molson River, Keepeewiskawakun River
- Primary outflows: Hayes River
- Basin countries: Canada
- Max. length: 45 km (28 mi)
- Max. width: 22 km (14 mi)
- Surface area: 400 km^{2} (150 sq mi)
- Surface elevation: 221 m (725 ft)

Molson Lake is a lake in Northern Region, Manitoba, Canada and the source of the Hayes River. It is located about 60 kilometres (37 mi) northeast of the community of Norway House.

The lake is 45 kilometres (28 mi) long and 22 kilometres (14 mi) wide, has an area of 400 square kilometres (154 sq mi), and lies at an elevation of 221 metres (725 ft). The primary inflows are the Molson River and Keepeewiskawakun River at the south, and the primary outflow is the Hayes River at the north of the lake, which heads towards Robinson Lake.

Molson Lake Airport is on the north shore of the lake at the west end.

== Tributaries ==
Counterclockwise from the Hayes River outlet

- Panepuyew Creek
- Paimusk Creek
- Keepeewiskawakun River
- Molson River

== See also ==
- List of lakes of Manitoba

== Notes ==
- "Molson Lake". Geographical Names Data Base. Natural Resources Canada.
- "Topographic Map sheets 63I1, 63I2, 63I3, 63I6, 63I7". Atlas of Canada. Natural Resources Canada. 4 February 2010.
