= List of rivers of Manitoba =

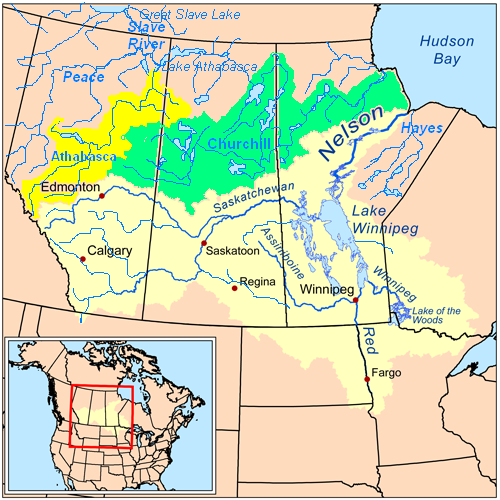
River basins in Alberta, Saskatchewan and Manitoba

This is an incomplete list of rivers of Manitoba, a province of Canada.

== Watersheds ==
The entire province of Manitoba is within the Hudson Bay drainage basin:

- Nelson River
  - Lake Winnipeg watershed
    - Winnipeg River
    - Red River
      - Assiniboine River
        - Qu'Appelle River
        - Souris River
    - Saskatchewan River
      - Lake Winnipegosis watershed

== A ==
- Antler River
- Armit River
- Armstrong River
- Assean River
- Assiniboine River

== B ==
- Beaver Creek
- Berens River
- Birch River
- Black Duck Creek
- Black Duck River
- Bloodvein River
- Bolton River
- Boots Creek
- Boundary Creek
- Boyne River
- Broad River
- Brokenhead River
- Burntwood River

== C ==
- Caribou River
- Carrot River
- Churchill River
- Cochrane River
- Cypress River

== D ==
- Dauphin River

== E ==
- Echimamish River
- Echoing River

== F ==
- Fairford River
- Fox River

== G ==
- Gainsborough Creek
- Gods River
- Goose Creek
- Goose River
- Graham Creek
- Grass River

== H ==
- Hargrave River
- Hayes River

== J ==
- Joe River

== L ==
- La Salle River
- Leslie Creek
- Limestone River
- Little Churchill River
- Little Partridge River
- Little Saskatchewan River

== M ==
- Manigotagan River
- Minago River
- Mink River
- Minnedosa River
- Mistik Creek
- Mossey River

== N ==
- Nelson River

== O ==
- Omand's Creek
- Overflowing River
- Owl River

== P ==
- Pasquatchai River
- Pasquia River
- Pembina River
- Pineroot River
- Pipestone Creek
- Plum Creek
- Poplar River

== Q ==
- Qu'Appelle River

== R ==
- Rat River (Burntwood River tributary)
- Rat River (Red River of the North tributary)
- Red Deer River
- Red River of the North
- Roaring River
- Roseau River

== S ==
- Saskatchewan River
- Seal River
- Seine River
- Shell River
- Silcox Creek
- Sky Pilot Creek
- Souris River
- Sturgeon Creek
- Sturgeon River
- Swan River
- Swift Creek

== T ==
- Tiny Creek
- Turtle River

== V ==
- Valley River
- Vamp Creek
- Vermilion River

== W ==
- Waterhen River
- Weir River
- Wesachewan River
- Whitefish River
- Whitemouth River
- Whitemud River
- Whiteshell River
- Willow Creek
- Winnipeg River
- Wolf River
- Woody River

== See also ==
- List of rivers of Canada
- List of Hudson Bay rivers
- List of rivers of the Americas
