= Owl River (Manitoba) =

- Location of the mouth of the Owl River in Manitoba

Location
- Country: Canada
- Province: Manitoba
- Region: Northern
- Census division: 23

Physical characteristics
- Source: Fly Lake
  - coordinates: 57°23′49″N 94°34′24″W
  - elevation: 173 m (568 ft)
- Mouth: Hudson Bay
  - coordinates: 57°50′45″N 92°45′01″W
  - elevation: 0 m (0 ft)

Basin features
- River system: Hudson Bay drainage basin
- Tributaries
  - right: Silcox Creek

The Owl River is a river in the Hudson Bay drainage basin in census division 23 in Northern Manitoba, Canada. It flows from Fly Lake to Hudson Bay.

The river is crossed at the community of Herchmer, the location of Herchmer railway station, by the Hudson Bay Railway. Herchmer railway station is served by the Via Rail Winnipeg – Churchill train.

A large portion of the river from its mouth upstream is part of Wapusk National Park.

== Tributaries ==
Silcox Creek is a river in the Hudson Bay drainage basin in census division 23 in Northern Manitoba, Canada. Its flows from David Wilson Lake to the Owl River as a right tributary.

== See also ==
- List of rivers of Manitoba
