= James Hayes (Prince Rupert's secretary) =

English secretary and Member of Parliament

Sir James Hayes (1637–1694) was secretary to Prince Rupert and first Deputy-Governor of the Hudson's Bay Company.

He was born the son of James Hayes in Beckington, Somerset. He was educated at St Paul's School (London) and Corpus Christi College, Oxford, where he matriculated in 1649. He was admitted to Lincoln's Inn in 1649 and called to the Bar in 1656.

In 1659 he was elected MP for Marlborough (Jan-May 1659) and appointed Recorder of Marlborough. In May 1663 he was a founding Fellow of the Royal Society.

He secured the post as Secretary to Prince Rupert at a time when England and France were vying for the natural riches of what is now Canada. Hayes was behind the 1668 expedition whereby two French fur-traders, Pierre-Esprit Radisson and Médard des Groseilliers, were financially supported in an effort to set up a permanent British trading post on the shores of Hudson Bay. Under Hayes guidance this in May 1672 became the Hudson's Bay Company with the sole rights to trade in a huge area of North America. He became their first Deputy Governor under Prince Rupert, who was the first Governor. He was knighted in 1670.

In 1682 he bought Bedgebury Manor in Gouldhurst, Kent from Thomas Culpeper and rebuilt Bedgebury House in a new location within the park.

He died in 1694. He had married in 1664 Rachel, daughter of Anthony Hungerford and widow of Henry Cary, 4th Viscount Falkland. Their daughter Rachel married Lord David Hay, son of the Marquess of Tweeddale.

The Hayes River which flows into Hudson Bay was named after him in 1684.
