= Swift Creek (Manitoba) =

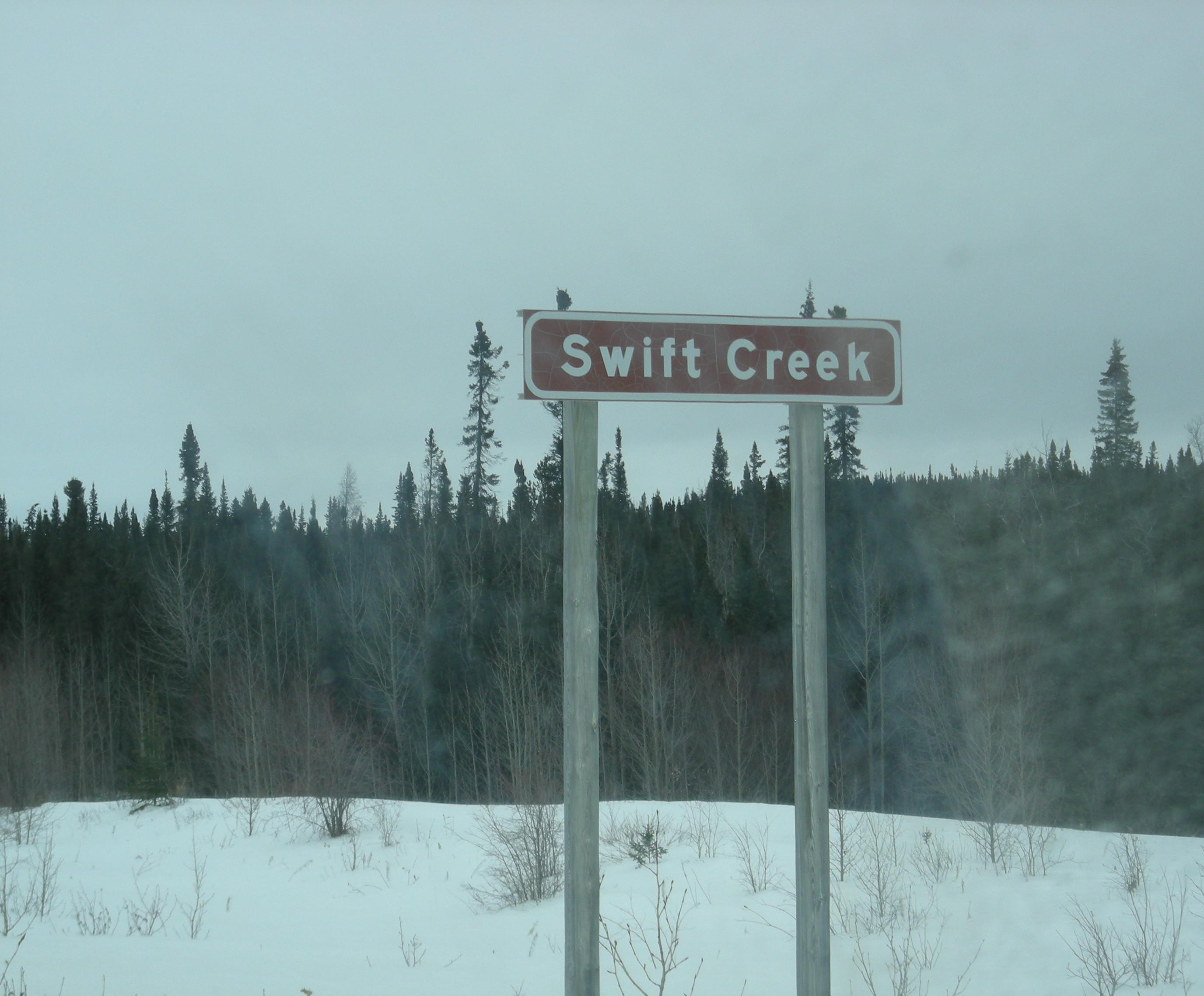
- Road sign for Swift Creek

- Location of the mouth of Swift Creek in Manitoba

Location
- Country: Canada
- Province: Manitoba
- Region: Northern

Physical characteristics
- Source: Unnamed lake
  - coordinates: 56°38′45″N 94°05′34″W
  - elevation: 111 m (364 ft)
- Mouth: Nelson River
  - coordinates: 56°37′44″N 93°51′40″W
  - elevation: 36 m (118 ft)

Basin features
- River system: Hudson Bay drainage basin

Swift Creek is a river in the Hudson Bay drainage basin in Northern Manitoba, Canada. It runs from an unnamed lake to the Nelson River, which it enters as a left tributary. The river flows under the Hudson Bay Railway (passed by the Via Rail Winnipeg – Churchill train), between the flag stops of Charlebois to the north and Amery to the south, just past its source; and under Manitoba Provincial Road 290 just before its mouth.

== See also ==
- List of rivers of Manitoba
