= Goose Creek (Manitoba, Nelson) =

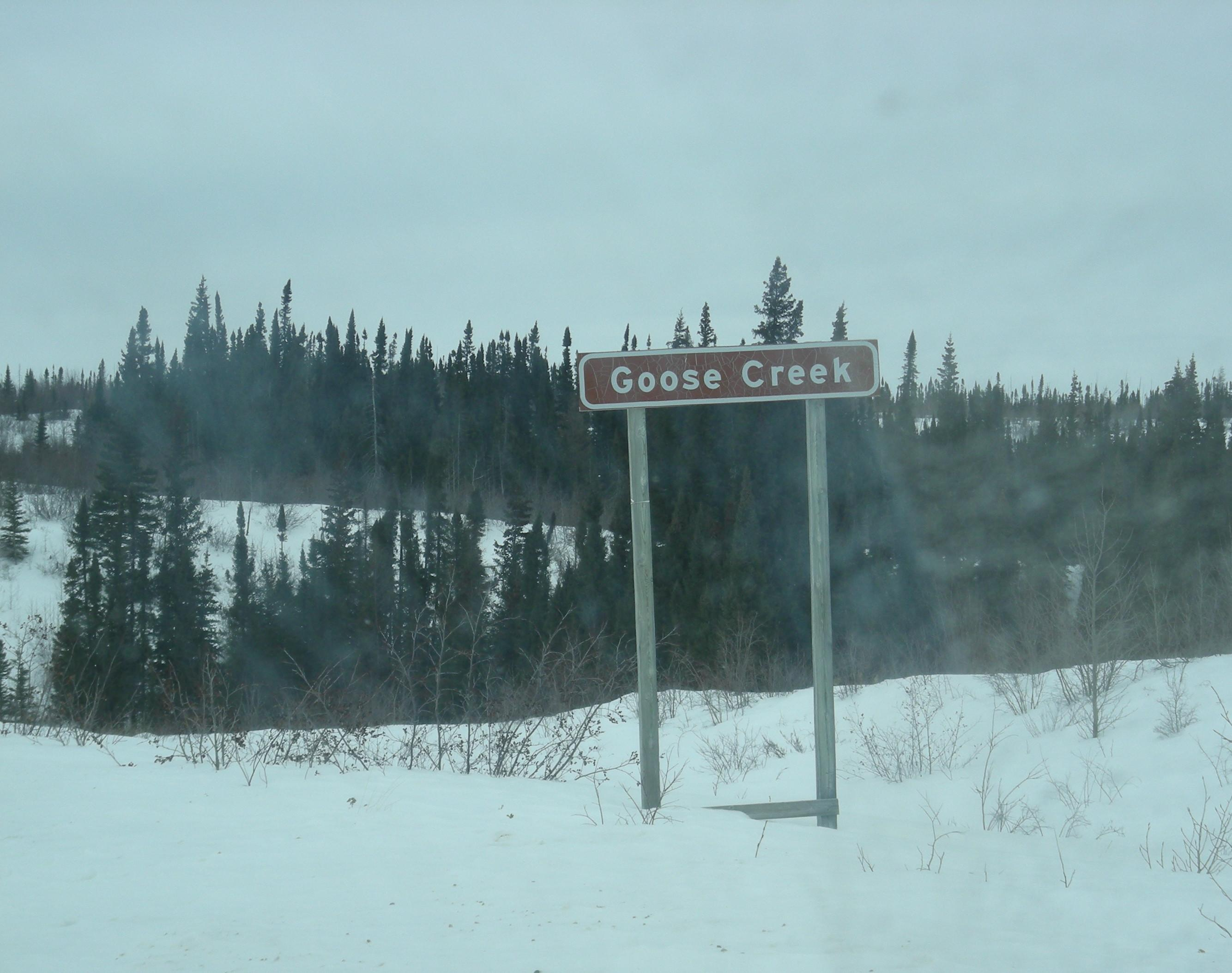
- Road sign for Goose Creek

- Location of the mouth of Goose Creek in Manitoba

Location
- Country: Canada
- Province: Manitoba
- Region: Northern

Physical characteristics
- Source: Unnamed lake
  - coordinates: 56°38′58″N 94°13′15″W
  - elevation: 144 m (472 ft)
- Mouth: Nelson River
  - coordinates: 56°39′41″N 93°49′29″W
  - elevation: 35 m (115 ft)

Basin features
- River system: Hudson Bay drainage basin

Goose Creek is a river in the Hudson Bay drainage basin in Northern Manitoba, Canada. It runs from an unnamed lake to the Nelson River, which it enters as a left tributary. The river flows under the Hudson Bay Railway (passed by the Via Rail Winnipeg – Churchill train), between the flag stops of Weir River to the north and Charlebois to the south, close to its source; and under Manitoba Provincial Road 290 just before its mouth.

== See also ==
- List of rivers of Manitoba
