= Armstrong River (Manitoba) =

River in Manitoba, Canada

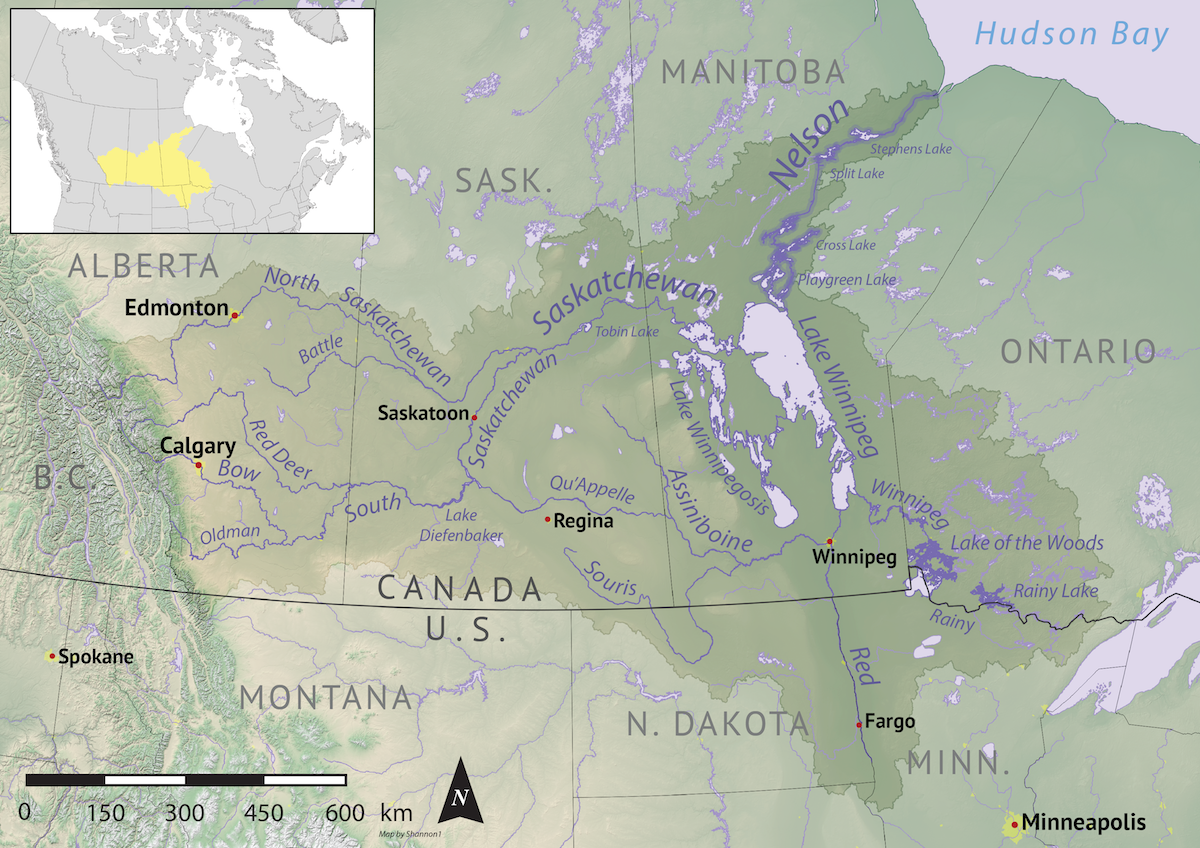
- Map of the Nelson River drainage basin

- Location of river's mouth in Manitoba Armstrong River (Manitoba) (Canada)

Location
- Country: Canada

Physical characteristics
- Source: Armstrong Lake
  - location: Manitoba
- Mouth: Nelson River
  - coordinates: 55.7689°N 96.6406°W

Armstrong River is a river in the Canadian province of Manitoba. The river flows east from Armstrong Lake into the Nelson River. Like Armstrong Lake, it was named after H. W. D. Armstrong, who was chief engineer of construction on the Hudson Bay Railway in 1912.

== See also ==
- List of rivers of Manitoba
