= Whitefish River (Manitoba) =

- Location of the mouth of the Whitefish River in Manitoba.

Location
- Country: Canada
- Province: Manitoba
- Region: Northern Region
- Census Division: No. 21

Physical characteristics
- Source: Rocky Lake
  - coordinates: 54°04′45″N 101°33′18″W
  - elevation: 260 m (850 ft)
- Mouth: Saskatchewan River
  - coordinates: 53°51′00″N 101°23′02″W
  - elevation: 256 m (840 ft)
- Length: 43 km (27 mi)

The Whitefish River is a river in Census Division 21 in the Northern Region of Manitoba, Canada. It is in the Hudson Bay and Nelson River drainage basins and is a left tributary of the Saskatchewan River.

== Course ==
The river begins at Rocky Lake and heads east to Root Lake. It then turns south, passes through Reader Lake, and reaches its mouth at the Saskatchewan River, just upstream of the community of Big Eddy Settlement and 8 kilometres (5 mi) west of The Pas, Manitoba.

== Tributaries ==
- Red Rock Creek (left)
- Dinner Place Creek (right)
- Rocky Lake
  - Maria Creek

== See also ==
- List of rivers of Manitoba
