= Little Churchill River =

- Location of the mouth of the river in Manitoba

Location
- Country: Canada
- Province: Manitoba
- Region: Northern

Physical characteristics
- Source: Waskaiowaka Lake
  - coordinates: 56°35′02″N 96°15′42″W
  - elevation: 208 m (682 ft)
- Mouth: Churchill River
  - coordinates: 57°30′20″N 95°21′30″W
  - elevation: 135 m (443 ft)

Basin features
- River system: Hudson Bay drainage basin

The Little Churchill River is a river in the Hudson Bay drainage basin in Northern Manitoba, Canada. It flows from Waskaiowaka Lake to the Churchill River.

The Little Churchill River/Dunlop's Fly In Lodge Aerodrome is located on Waskaiowaka Lake at the point where the Little Churchill River leaves the lake.

== See also ==
- List of rivers of Manitoba
