= Rabaska =

Traditional Canadian canoe

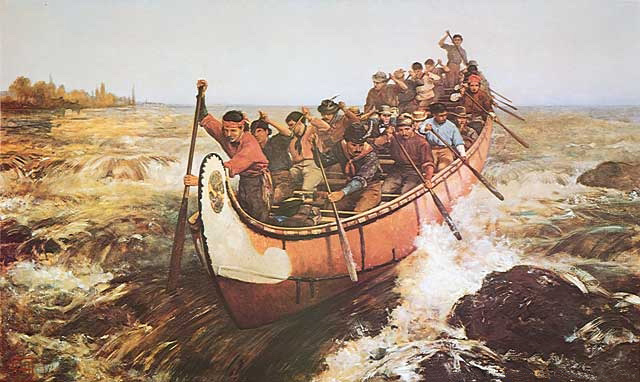
Shooting the Rapids (Frances Anne Hopkins, 1879)

A rabaska or Maître canoe (French: canot de maître, after Louis Maître, an artisan from Trois-Rivières who made them) was originally a large canoe made of tree bark, used by the Algonquin people.

Rabaskas were used by French and Canadian explorers to access the interior of North America during the 17th and 18th centuries, and by travellers and traders until the end of the 19th century. Throughout this time they were key in spreading French settlers throughout North America, adapting to their new continent and developing contact with indigenous populations.

== Etymology ==
The word rabaska is a Canadianism from New France. It is derived from athapaskaw, a word common to Algonquin and Cree. This word designates the Athabasca River and its original meaning is "grass and reeds here and there".

== Specifications ==
A rabaska has rather impressive dimensions: 10 metres (33 feet) long by 1.5 metres (5 feet) wide and capable of carrying ten adults with much cargo. The unladen weight of a rabasca is about 150 kilograms (330 pounds).

For sport and leisure, a typical crew consists of twelve rowers in six banks and a cox at the stern.

A rabaska is prized for its speed and robustness, but it has a large draught. In shallow waters it is liable to grounding. To prevent damage, the bow rowers must quickly jump into the water and dislodge the craft.

== Past use ==
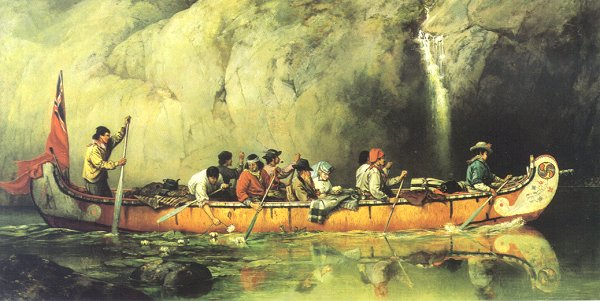
Canoe crew passing before a waterfall (Frances Anne Hopkins, 1869)

People of the First Nations used rabaskas for travel, commerce and finding new, viable sites to raise their families. Rabaskas were the vessel of choice for fur traders, because of their large cargo capacity. They also supplied the farthest outposts of the fur trade. Each spring, rabaska canoes by the dozen with experienced crews would undertake the long voyage from Lachine (near Montreal) to the Pays d'en Haut, seeking out precious furs. They would not return until autumn. The rabaska's robustness enabled exploration – and exploitation – of distant territories which were inaccessible by other means of transport. Some crews hired singers to keep stroke and increase productivity.

== Present use ==
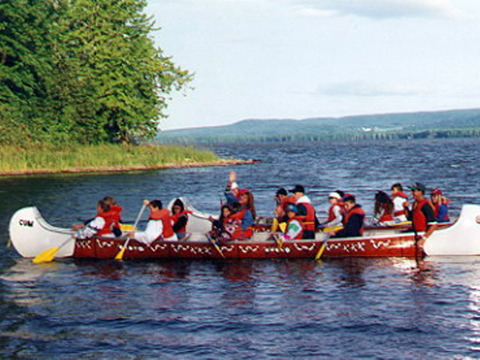
Young people in a rabaska on the Lake of Two Mountains

Today, rabaskas are an outdoor leisure pursuit. The large crew and the stability of the craft allow time for breaks and sightseeing.

Rabaskas are also familiar in sport, and in Quebec this is competitive: at the end of each August there is the Classique internationale de canots de la Mauricie ("Mauricie International Canoe Classic"), where all the rabaska teams can be seen. This three-day competition takes place on the Saint-Maurice River, from La Tuque downstream to Trois-Rivières, nearly 200 kilometres (120 miles) away.

== See also ==
- Canadian canoe
