= Leslie Creek (Manitoba) =

Canadian river

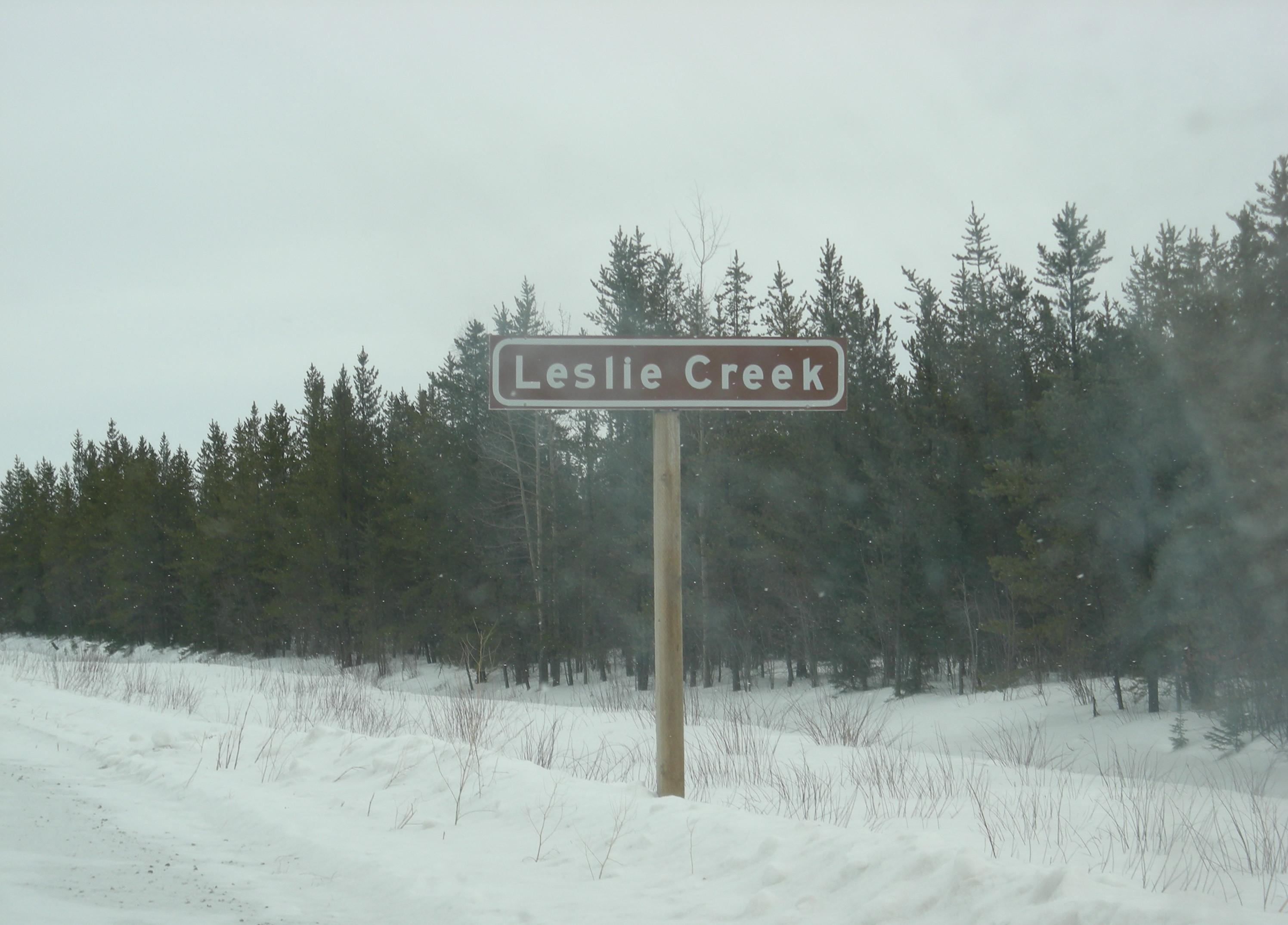
- Road sign for Leslie Creek

- Location of the mouth of Leslie Creek in Manitoba

Location
- Country: Canada
- Province: Manitoba
- Region: Northern

Physical characteristics
- Source: Marsh
  - coordinates: 56°29′26″N 94°27′09″W
  - elevation: 136 m (446 ft)
- Mouth: Nelson River
  - coordinates: 56°25′03″N 94°13′45″W
  - elevation: 88 m (289 ft)

Basin features
- River system: Hudson Bay drainage basin

Leslie Creek is a river in the Hudson Bay drainage basin in Northern Manitoba, Canada. It is a left tributary of the Nelson River.

== See also ==
- List of rivers of Manitoba
