= Fox River (Manitoba) =

- Location of mouth

Location
- Country: Canada
- Province: Manitoba

Physical characteristics
- Mouth
  - coordinates: 56.052°N 93.292°W

The Fox River is a river in northern Manitoba, Canada. It flows east-northeast parallel to and between the Nelson River to the north and the Hayes River to the south. It joins the Hayes about 121 kilometres (75 mi) southeast of its mouth on Hudson Bay. About 121 kilometres (75 mi) above its juncture with the Hayes it splits with the southern branch being the Bigstone River. At the head of the Bigstone is Utik or Deer Lake from which it is possible to cross to Cross Lake on the Nelson. This route was part of the "Middle Tract" used by smaller Indian canoes to bring furs to the Hudson's Bay Company posts of Hudson Bay.

== See also ==
- List of rivers of Manitoba
