= Shamattawa First Nation =

Shamattawa First Nation ᑭᓭᒫᑖᐘ kisêmâtâwa
- Indian reserve
- Location in Manitoba
- Coordinates: 55°51′11″N 92°05′11″W
- Country: Canada
- Province: Manitoba
- Region: Northern
- Census division: 23

Area
  - Total: 21.6 km^{2} (8.3 sq mi)
- Elevation: 76 m (249 ft)

Population (2016)
  - Total: 1,019
  - Density: 47.2/km^{2} (122/sq mi)
- Time zone: UTC-6 (Central Time Zone)
  - Summer (DST): UTC-5 (Central Time Zone)
- Postal code: R0B 1K0
- Area codes: 204, 431
- GNBC Code: GAYWF
- Shamattawa First Nation

Land
- Main reserve: Shamattawa 1

Population
- On reserve: 1425
- Total population: 1425

Government
- Chief: Jordna Hill

Tribal Council
- Keewatin Tribal Council

The Shamattawa First Nation (Cree: ᑭᓭᒫᑖᐘ, kisêmâtâwa) (55°51′30″N 92°05′46″W) is a remote First Nations community in northern Manitoba, Canada, located in the reserve of Shamattawa 1.

Shamattawa 1 is located on the banks of the Gods River where the Echoing River joins as a right tributary. The population as of 2016 was 1,019, an increase of 2.1% over the 2011 figure of 998.

An isolated community, Shamattawa for part of the year is only connected to the rest of the province by winter and ice roads − temporary roads over frozen water. Winter roads also extend east of the community towards Fort Severn, and Peawanuck, Ontario. It can also be reached via Shamattawa Airport. It has only one grocery store.

A polar bear was sighted in Shamattawa in August 2010, 400 kilometres (249 mi) south of its typical range.

== Climate ==
Shamattawa has a subarctic climate (Köppen climate classification Dfc) with mild summers and severely cold winters. Precipitation is moderate, but is significantly higher in summer than at other times of the year. Due to its proximity to the Hudson Bay, storm systems often blow ashore with little warning.

Climate data for Shamattawa
Month	Jan	Feb	Mar	Apr	May	Jun	Jul	Aug	Sep	Oct	Nov	Dec	Year
Mean daily maximum °C (°F)	−19.3 (−2.7)	−16.3 (2.7)	−8.7 (16.3)	2.6 (36.7)	9.0 (48.2)	17.3 (63.1)	21.7 (71.1)	19.6 (67.3)	13.0 (55.4)	4.2 (39.6)	−6.2 (20.8)	−16.6 (2.1)	1.7 (35.1)
Mean daily minimum °C (°F)	−26.6 (−15.9)	−25.9 (−14.6)	−19.7 (−3.5)	−8.7 (16.3)	−1.6 (29.1)	5.4 (41.7)	10.5 (50.9)	9.6 (49.3)	4.6 (40.3)	−1.9 (28.6)	−12.6 (9.3)	−23.8 (−10.8)	−7.6 (18.4)
Average precipitation mm (inches)	20 (0.8)	16 (0.6)	22 (0.9)	28 (1.1)	38 (1.5)	58 (2.3)	79 (3.1)	74 (2.9)	63 (2.5)	47 (1.9)	39 (1.5)	26 (1.0)	510 (20.1)
Average precipitation days (≥ 1mm)	3	2	4	2	5	5	8	7	5	5	5	3	54
Mean daily sunshine hours	3	4	6	7	7	8	9	7	4	2	2	2	5
Percentage possible sunshine	38	46	48	50	44	46	51	50	32	22	23	30	40
Source 1: http://www.worldclimateguide.co.uk/climateguides/manitoba/shamattawa.php
Source 2: http://www.storm247.com/weather/10878870/climate (temperature & rainy days)
