= Molson Indy =

Molson Indy can refer to any of the following races:

- Grand Prix of Montreal, formerly the Molson Indy Montreal
- Honda Indy Toronto, formerly the Molson Indy Toronto
- Molson Indy Vancouver, discontinued in 2004
