= Echoing River =

- Location of the mouth of the Echoing River in Manitoba

Location
- Country: Canada
- Provinces: Manitoba; Ontario
- City: Shamattawa

Physical characteristics
- Source: Echoing Lake
  - location: Unorganized Kenora District, Northwestern Ontario
  - coordinates: 54°31′23″N 92°09′59″W
  - elevation: 184 m (604 ft)
- Mouth: Gods River
  - location: Northern Region, Manitoba
  - coordinates: 55°50′52″N 92°04′53″W
  - elevation: 76 m (249 ft)

Basin features
- River system: Hudson Bay drainage basin
- Tributaries
  - left: Wapikani River, Saketchekaw River, Kakitayoamisk River, Ney River
  - right: Peckinow River, Pechabau River, Sturgeon River, Pasquatchai River, Ellard River, Hanson River

The Echoing River is a river in the Hudson Bay drainage basin in Manitoba and Ontario, Canada. Its flows from its source at Echoing Lake in the unorganized part of Kenora District, Northwestern Ontario to its mouth as a right tributary of the Gods River in Northern Manitoba. The Gods River flows via the Hayes River to Hudson Bay.

The First Nations community of Shamattawa is at the river's mouth.

== Tributaries ==
- Peckinow River (right)
- Wapikani River (left)
- Pechabau River (right)
- Sturgeon River (right)
- Isquitao Creek (right)
- North Wanitawagao Creek (right)
- South Wanitawagao Creek (right)
- Pasquatchai River (right)
- Saketchekaw River (left)
- Kakitayoamisk River (left)
- Brice Creek (left)
- Ellard River (right)
- Ney River (left)
- Hanson River (right)

== See also ==
- List of rivers of Manitoba
- List of rivers of Ontario
