= Gods Lake =

Lake in Manitoba, Canada

- Location in Manitoba Gods Lake (Canada)
- Location: Northeastern Manitoba
- Coordinates: 54°40′26″N 94°14′48″W
- Part of: Hudson Bay drainage basin
- Primary inflows: Wesachewan River
- Primary outflows: Gods River
- Catchment area: 20,000 km^{2} (7,700 sq mi)
- Basin countries: Canada
- Max. length: 74 km (46 mi)
- Surface area: 1,061 km^{2} (410 sq mi)
- Average depth: 13.2 m (43 ft)
- Max. depth: 75.3 m (247 ft)
- Residence time: 2.68 years
- Shore length^{1}: 474 km (295 mi)
- Surface elevation: 180 m (591 ft)
- Islands: Elk Island and many smaller islands
- Settlements: Gods Lake, Gods Lake Narrows, Gods River
- ^{1} Shore length is not a well-defined measure.

Gods Lake is a lake in northeastern Manitoba in Canada. The lake covers an area of 1,151 square kilometres (444 sq mi) with a net (water surface) area of 1,061 square kilometres (410 sq mi), making it the 7th largest lake in the province. It lies north of Island Lake at an elevation of 178 metres (584 ft), approximately 280 kilometres (174 mi) east of Thompson, Manitoba. It has a shore length of 474 kilometres (295 mi). It drains north via the Gods River and the Hayes River to Hudson Bay.

The area was featured in season 7 of the reality television series Ice Road Truckers. Richard Wagamese writes about Gods Lake in Indian Horse.

== Settlements ==
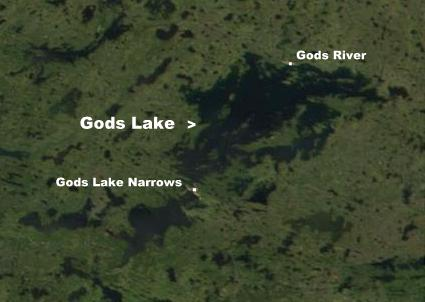
Gods Lake, Manitoba

The First Nations communities of Gods Lake Narrows, Gods Lake (God's Lake 23), and Gods River are located on the shores of the lake.

Gods Lake Narrows is in the southern portion of Gods Lake where the lake narrows. The community is built on an island in the narrows of the lake and on the west and east shores. Gods Lake Narrows consists of the northern community of Gods Lake Narrows (a designated place in the 2011 Canada Census) with a population of 85 and God's Lake 23, a God's Lake First Nation community of 1,341 people.

At the mouth of Gods River on the northern end of the lake is the primary settlement of the Manto Sipi First Nation community of Gods River (God's River 86A) with 596 people.

== See also ==
- List of lakes of Manitoba
- Animism: The God's Lake, a Canadian TV series
- Indian Horse (film)
