= Gods River =

River in Manitoba, Canada

- Location of the mouth of the Gods River in Manitoba Gods River (Canada)
- Native name: Mantō-sīpiy (Cree)

Location
- Country: Canada
- Province: Manitoba
- Region: Northern

Physical characteristics
- Source: Gods Lake
  - coordinates: 54°50′28″N 94°05′42″W
  - elevation: 178 m (584 ft)
- Mouth: Hayes River
  - coordinates: 56°22′20″N 92°50′55″W
  - elevation: 25 m (82 ft)

Basin features
- River system: Hudson Bay drainage basin
- Tributaries
  - left: Yakaw River
  - right: Echoing River; Red Sucker River
- Inland ports: Shamattawa; Gods River

The Gods River is a remote wilderness river in the Hudson Bay drainage basin in Northern Manitoba, Canada. Its flows from its source at Gods Lake to its mouth at the Hayes River. The Hayes River flows to Hudson Bay.

The First Nations communities of Gods River (Manto Sipi Cree Nation) and Shamattawa are located at the river's source and at the confluence with the Echoing River respectively.

== Tributaries ==
- Yakaw River (left)
- Echoing River (right)
- Red Sucker River (right)
  - Stull River
  - White Goose River

== See also ==
- List of rivers of Manitoba
