= Division No. 22, Manitoba =

Census division in Canada

Coordinates: 54°50′N 95°30′W

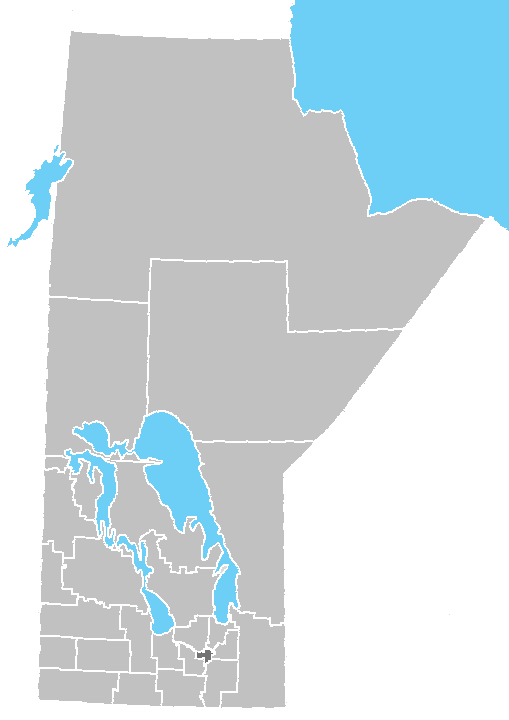

Division No. 22, also informally known as Thompson-North Central, is a census division within the Province of Manitoba, Canada. Unlike in some other provinces, census divisions do not reflect the organization of local government in Manitoba. These areas exist solely for the purposes of statistical analysis and presentation; they have no government of their own.

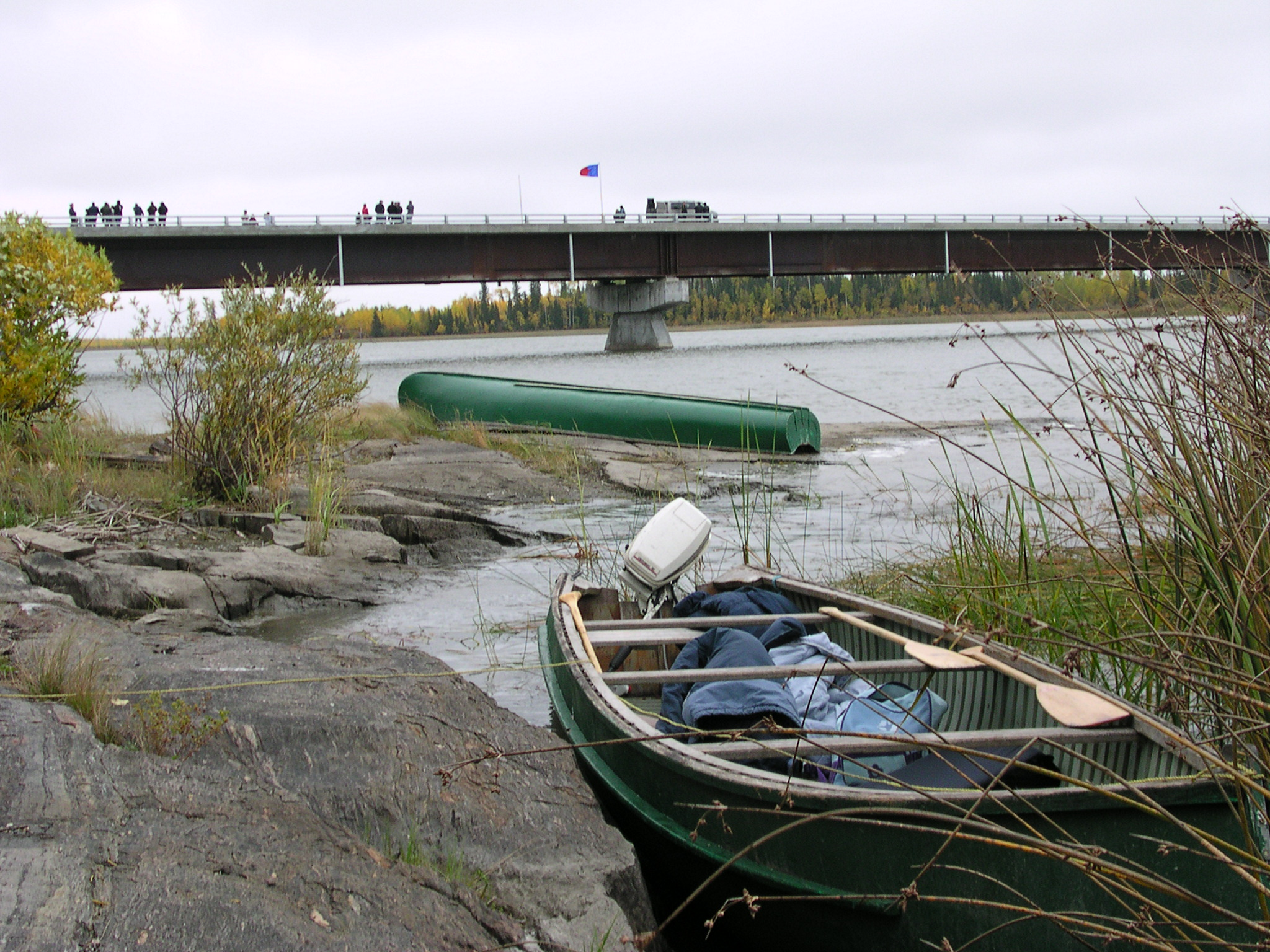
The Kichi Sipi Bridge (Manitoba Provincial Road 373)

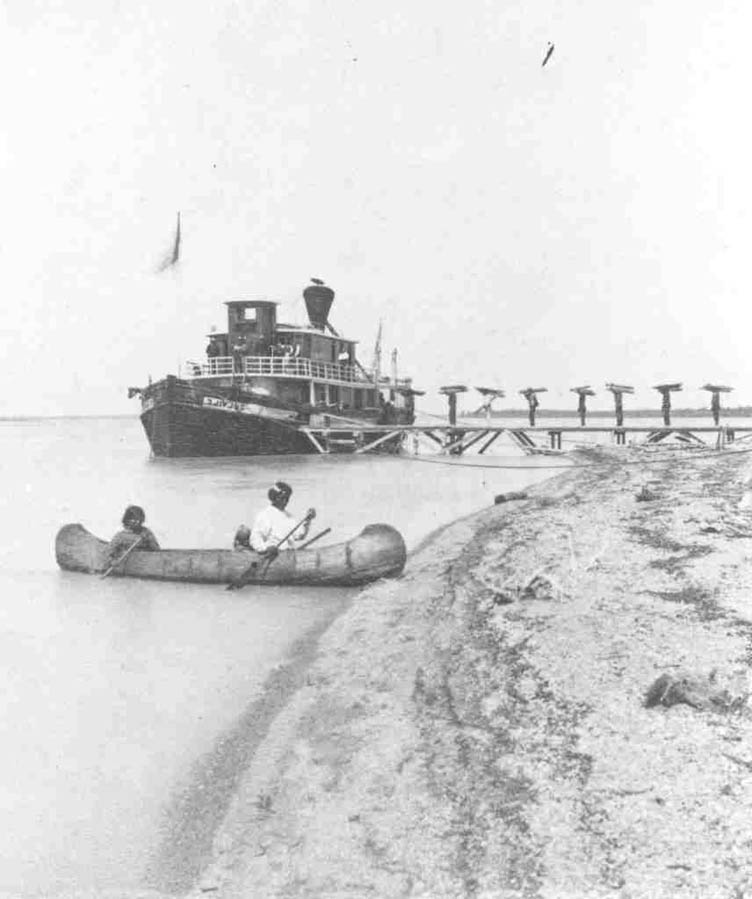
Norway House Manitoba, circa 1880

The division had a population of 38,421 in the Canada 2006 Census. The economic base of the area is mining, forestry, manufacturing, commercial fishing, trapping and tourism.

== Demographics ==
In the 2021 Census of Population conducted by Statistics Canada, Division No. 22 had a population of 42,226 living in 10,871 of its 12,478 total private dwellings, a change of 0.1% from its 2016 population of 42,165. With a land area of 89,802.82 km^{2} (34,673.06 sq mi), it had a population density of 0.5/km^{2} (1.2/sq mi) in 2021.

== Communities ==
=== City ===
- Thompson

=== Local Government District ===
- Mystery Lake

=== First Nations communities ===
- Cross Lake (19, 19A, 19B, 19C, 19E)
- Garden Hill
- Gods Lake Narrows 23
- Ilford
- Gods River 86A
- Nelson House 170
- Norway House 17
- Oxford House 24
- Red Sucker Lake 1976
- St. Theresa Point
- Split Lake 171 (part)
- Wasagamack
- York Factory

=== Unorganized Area ===
- Unorganized Division No. 22
