= Hayes River =

River in Manitoba, Canada

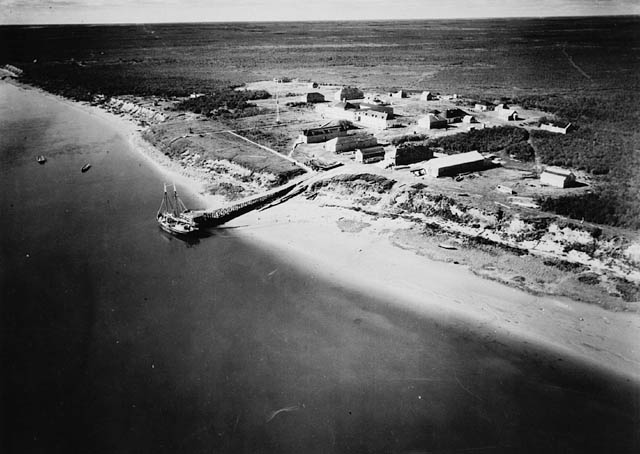
- York Factory on the Hayes River, circa 1925

- Location of the mouth of the Hayes River in Manitoba. Hayes River (Canada)
- Etymology: Named for Sir James Hayes, a Hudson's Bay Company (HBC) charter member

Location
- Country: Canada
- Province: Manitoba
- Region: Northern Region

Physical characteristics
- Source: Molson Lake
  - coordinates: 54°18′55″N 96°41′31″W
  - elevation: 221 m (725 ft)
- Mouth: Hudson Bay
  - coordinates: 57°03′27″N 92°10′45″W
  - elevation: 0 m (0 ft)
- Length: 483 km (300 mi)
- Basin size: 108,000 km^{2} (42,000 sq mi)
- Discharge
  - average: 590 m^{3}/s (21,000 cu ft/s)

Basin features
- River system: Hudson Bay drainage basin
- Tributaries
  - left: Fox River
  - right: Gods River

The Hayes River is a river in Northern Manitoba, Canada, that flows from Molson Lake to Hudson Bay at York Factory. It was historically an important river in the development of Canada and is now a Canadian Heritage River and the longest naturally flowing river in Manitoba.

== Course ==
The river begins at the northern end of Molson Lake (about 90 kilometres (56 mi) northeast of the northern tip of Lake Winnipeg) at an elevation of 221 metres (725 ft) and flows northeastward.

Near Molson Lake, the Echimamish River connects with the Hayes. The Echimamish is a river bifurcation that connects the Hayes to the Nelson River, which flows out of Lake Winnipeg. This river connector was used by the voyageurs to travel from York Factory on Hudson Bay, up the Hayes and across to the Nelson and on to Norway House at the north end of Lake Winnipeg.

Northeast of Robinson Lake is Robinson Falls and the mile-long Robinson portage which was the longest portage between Hudson Bay and Edmonton. Somewhere in this area is Hill Gates, a mile-long narrow gorge. Beyond this it cuts across Logan Lake, passes the settlement of Wetikoweskwattam to Opiminegoka Lake, where it takes the northeast-flowing Lawford River, flows through Windy Lake and over Wipanipanis Falls to Oxford Lake. It flows out of the lake at Oxford House then southeast over Trout Falls to Knee Lake. Exiting Knee Lake, the Hayes passes over a series of rapids and via several channels and widens into Swampy Lake.

At the east end of Swampy Lake, about 200 kilometres (120 mi) northeast of Molson Lake and 240 kilometres (150 mi) from Hudson bay is the Dramstone where west-bound travelers took a dram to celebrate leaving the most difficult part of the river. Including the rapids downstream from Knee Lake, in an 80-kilometre (50 mi) stretch the Hayes loses 5/7ths of its elevation in 1/6 of its length. From Swampy Lake it runs through a stretch of rapids, past Brassy Hill, rising 140 metres (459 ft) above the river, and takes in the right tributary High Hill River. The river continues northeast through a small canyon for about 100 kilometres (62 mi), therein passing over the Whitemud Falls and Berwick Falls, and takes in the major left tributary Fox River at an elevation of 43 metres (141 ft).

The Hayes River continues northeast and takes in the major right tributary Gods River at an elevation of 24 metres (79 ft), and reaches its mouth at Hudson Bay, immediately to the south of the mouth of the larger Nelson River and to the north of the mouth of the smaller Machichi River. 200 kilometres (120 mi) upriver from York Factory was Rock Depot where York boats had to be replaced by smaller canoes. It was 30 portages and 425 kilometres (264 mi) from Rock Depot to Norway House.

Different parts of the Hayes formerly had different names. According to one source, they were: "Hayes River" from the mouth to Gods River, "Steel River" to the Fox River, "Hill River" to Knee Lake, "Trout River" to Oxford Lake, and above Oxford Lake, Weepinipanish River and Franklin's River. Another source has: Trout, Bourbon, Jack Tent, Factory, Steel, Rabbit, and Hill Rivers, and the Rivière du Roc.

== Watershed ==
The river's physical characteristics include whitewater rapids, large lake systems, waterfalls, deep valleys and gorges, as well as tidal flats. It is 483 kilometres (300 mi) long, has a mean discharge of 590 cubic metres per second (21,000 cu ft/s), and its drainage basin covers 108,000 square kilometres (42,000 sq mi).

== History ==
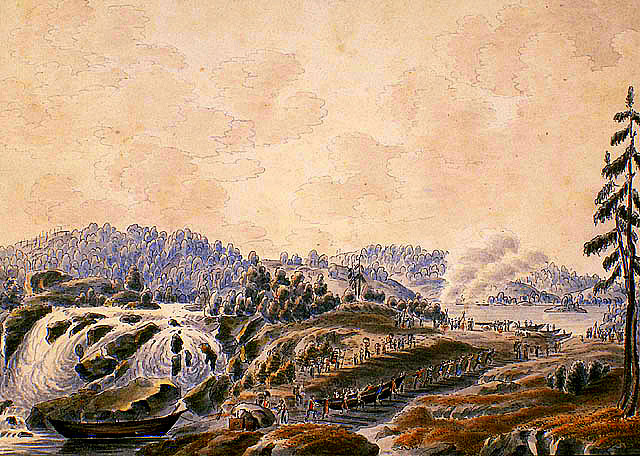
A brigade of York boats at a portage on the voyageur route by Peter Rindisbacher in 1821

Long before Europeans came to Canada, Manitoba First Nations were using the Hayes River as ancient campsites according to pictographs. It traverses the traditional territory of four First Nations: Norway House Cree Nation, Bunibonibee Cree Nation, Shamattawa First Nation, and York Factory Cree Nation. It continues to be an important source of traditional harvesting for the First Nations.

After the arrival of Europeans in North America, the river became an important link in the development of Canada. In 1684, the Hayes River was named for Sir James Hayes, a Hudson's Bay Company (HBC) charter member and secretary to Prince Rupert, by the French trader and explorer Pierre-Esprit Radisson. At its mouth, the HBC established York Factory in 1684, which served as its North American headquarters until 1957. The Hayes was the main route between York Factory and Norway House in the interior of the continent for explorers, fur traders, voyageurs and European settlers from 1670 to 1870. To get to the Hayes from Norway House required a short trip down the Nelson River, then a turn onto the Echimamish River. This route became the last leg of the York Factory Express known as "the Communication", once that was established in the early 19th century, connecting the HBC regional headquarters of the Columbia District at Fort Vancouver to York Factory.

== Natural history ==
The Hayes flows through some of the most pristine natural areas of Manitoba. It is home to polar bear, wolverine, woodland caribou, the ivory gull, sturgeon, brook trout, beluga whales, bald eagles, and moose, as well as a wide range of other wildlife. Travelling downstream, its banks are lined with dense spruce forests, which change to a mosaic of stunted black spruce, tamarack, and bogs.

The Hayes River became a Canadian Heritage River on June 11, 2006. Today, the river remains untouched. No dams or development mar its course. It is the longest naturally flowing river in Manitoba and therefore a popular recreational canoe route. It offers visitors and local people recreational and heritage experience opportunities including canoeing and boating, hunting, fishing, and learning about Canada’s fur trade.

== Tributaries ==
- Fountain Creek (right)
- French Creek (right)
- Ten Shilling Creek (right)
- Blackwater Creek (left)
- Pennycutaway River (left)
- Prost Creek (left)
- Rapid Hill Creek (right)
- Fox River (left)
- Kakwa Creek (left)
- Tachipo River (right)
- Apetowikossan Creek (left)
- Namas Creek (left)
- Kokasanakaw River (left)
- Knee Lake
  - Keyask River (right)
  - Wolf River (right)
  - Kaneesatiki River (right)
  - Magill Creek (right)
- Kapakiskok River (left)
- Kiasokanowak Creek (left)
- Oxford Lake
  - Laidlaw Creek (right)
  - Wapatakosanik River (left)
  - Semple River (left)
  - Minaposkatay River (left)
  - Carrot River (left)
  - Porcupine Hill Creek (left)
  - Oskatosko River (left)
- Lawford River (left)
- Muskwa Creek (right)

== See also ==
- List of rivers of Manitoba
