= List of lakes of Manitoba =

This is an incomplete list of lakes of Manitoba, a province of Canada.

== Larger lake statistics ==

The total area of a lake includes the area of islands. Lakes lying across provincial boundaries are listed in the province with the greater lake area.

Manitoba lakes larger than 400 km^{2} (150 sq mi)
Lake	Area (includes islands)	Altitude	Depth max.	Volume
Lake Winnipeg	24,387 km^{2} (9,416 sq mi)	217 m (712 ft)	36 m (118 ft)	284 km^{3} (68 cu mi)
Lake Winnipegosis	5,374 km^{2} (2,075 sq mi)	254 m (833 ft)	18.3 m (60 ft)	19.8 km^{3} (4.8 cu mi)
Lake Manitoba	4,624 km^{2} (1,785 sq mi)	248 m (814 ft)	7 m (23 ft)	22.8 km^{3} (5.5 cu mi)
Southern Indian Lake	2,247 km^{2} (868 sq mi)	254 m (833 ft)	30 m (98 ft)	23.4 km^{3} (5.6 cu mi)
Cedar Lake	1,353 km^{2} (522 sq mi)	253 m (830 ft)	10 m (33 ft)	10.2 km^{3} (2.4 cu mi)
Island Lake	1,223 km^{2} (472 sq mi)	227 m (745 ft)	59.4 m (195 ft)	21.8 km^{3} (5.2 cu mi)
Gods Lake	1,151 km^{2} (444 sq mi)	178 m (584 ft)	75.3 m (247 ft)	13.8 km^{3} (3.3 cu mi)
Cross Lake	755 km^{2} (292 sq mi)	207 m (679 ft)	12 m (39 ft)	0.52 km^{3} (0.12 cu mi)
Playgreen Lake	657 km^{2} (254 sq mi)	217 m (712 ft)	18 m (59 ft)	2.76 km^{3} (0.66 cu mi)
Dauphin Lake	519 km^{2} (200 sq mi)	260 m (850 ft)	3.4 m (11 ft)	1.29 km^{3} (0.31 cu mi)
Granville Lake	490 km^{2} (190 sq mi)	258 m (846 ft)		
Sipiwesk Lake	454 km^{2} (175 sq mi)	183 m (600 ft)		
Oxford Lake	401 km^{2} (155 sq mi)	186 m (610 ft)		
Molson Lake	400 km^{2} (150 sq mi)	221 m (725 ft)		

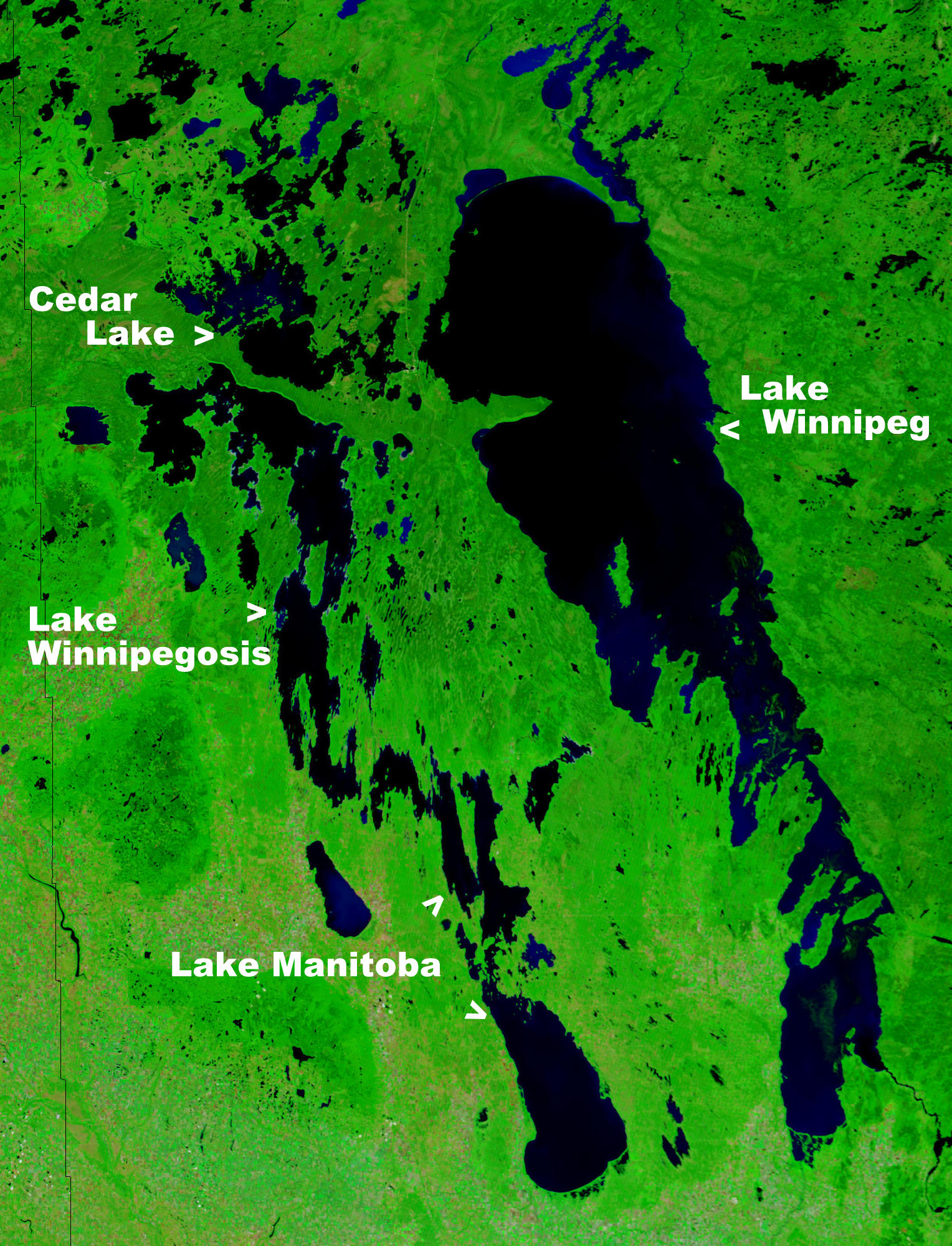
Lake Winnipeg

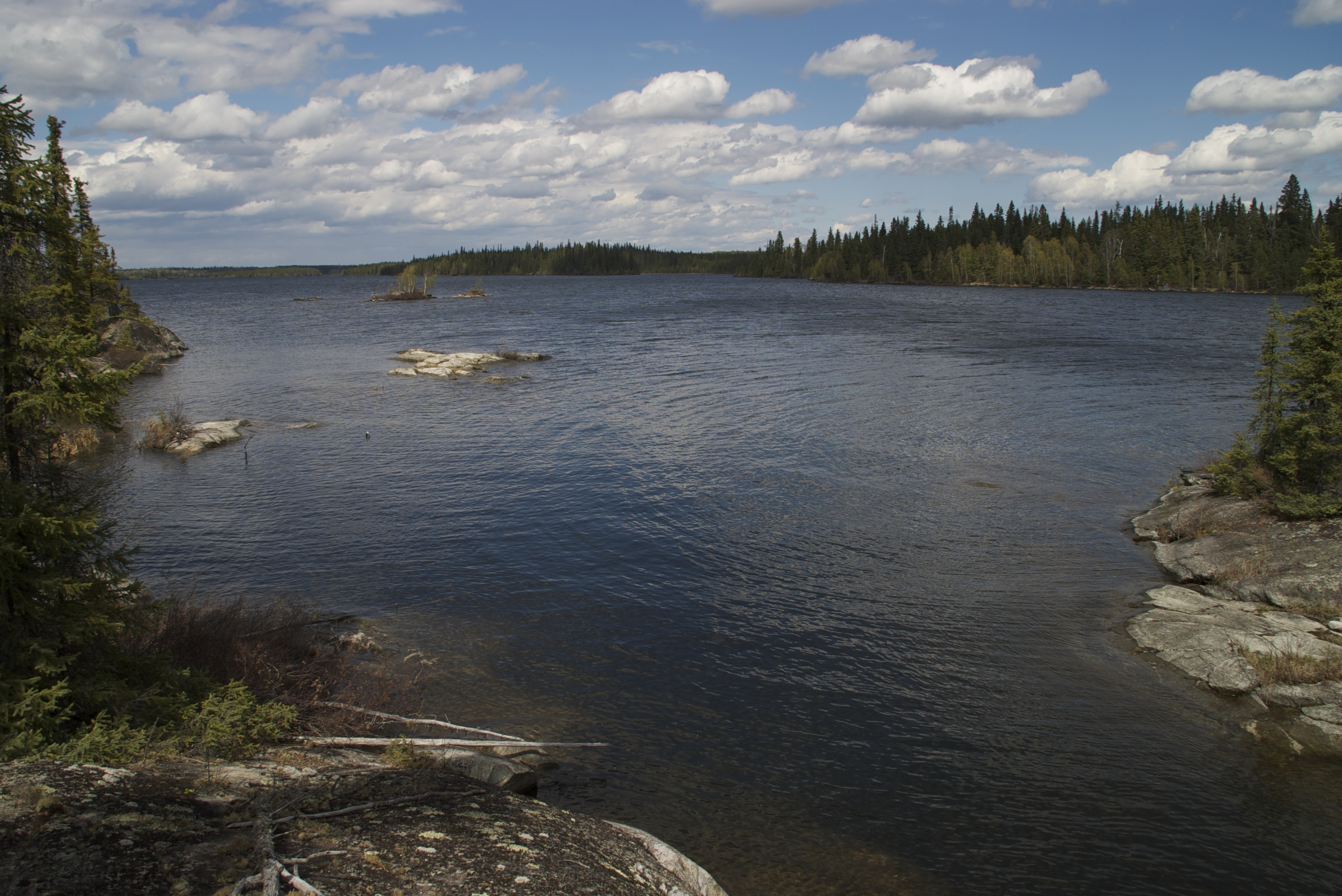
Alberts Lake

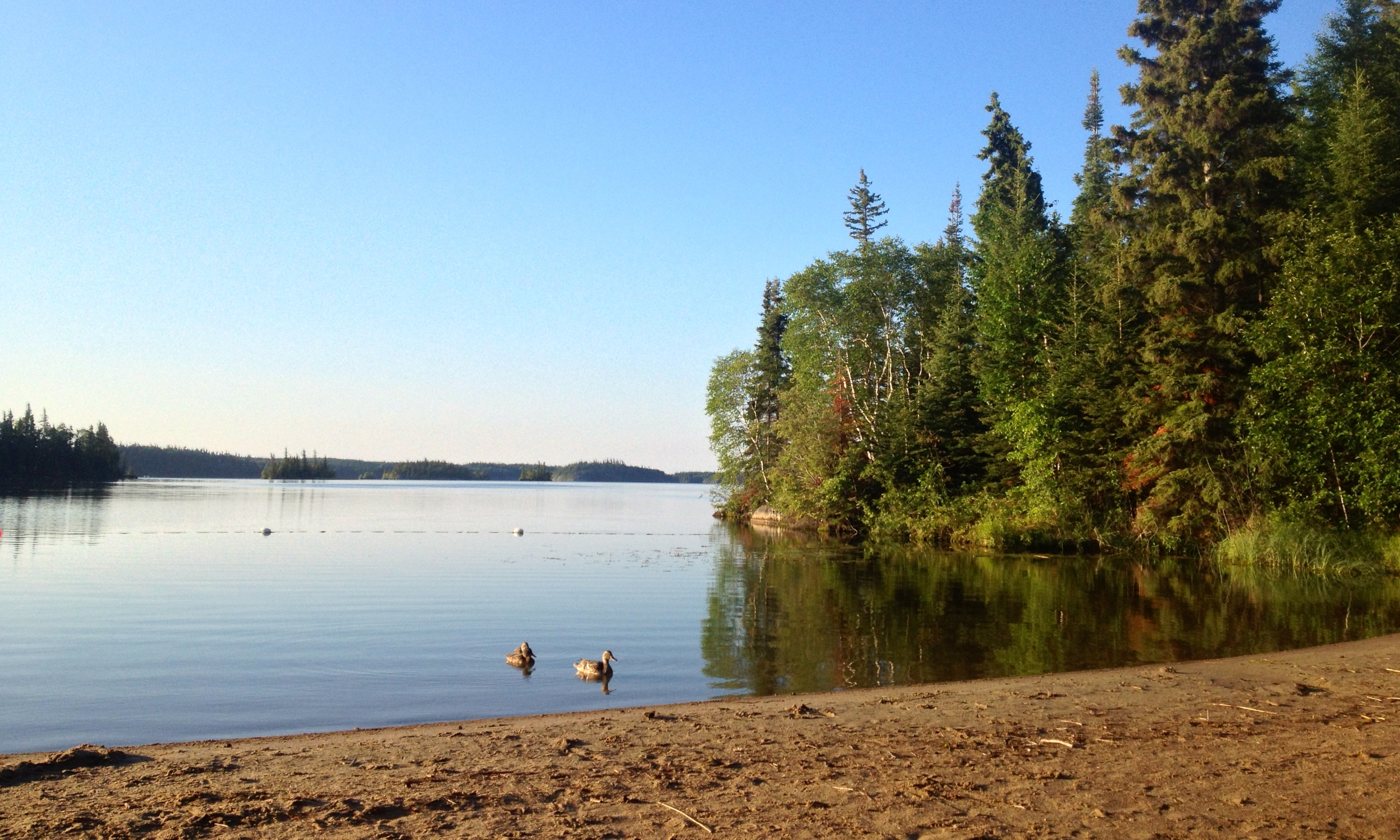
Lake Athapapuskow

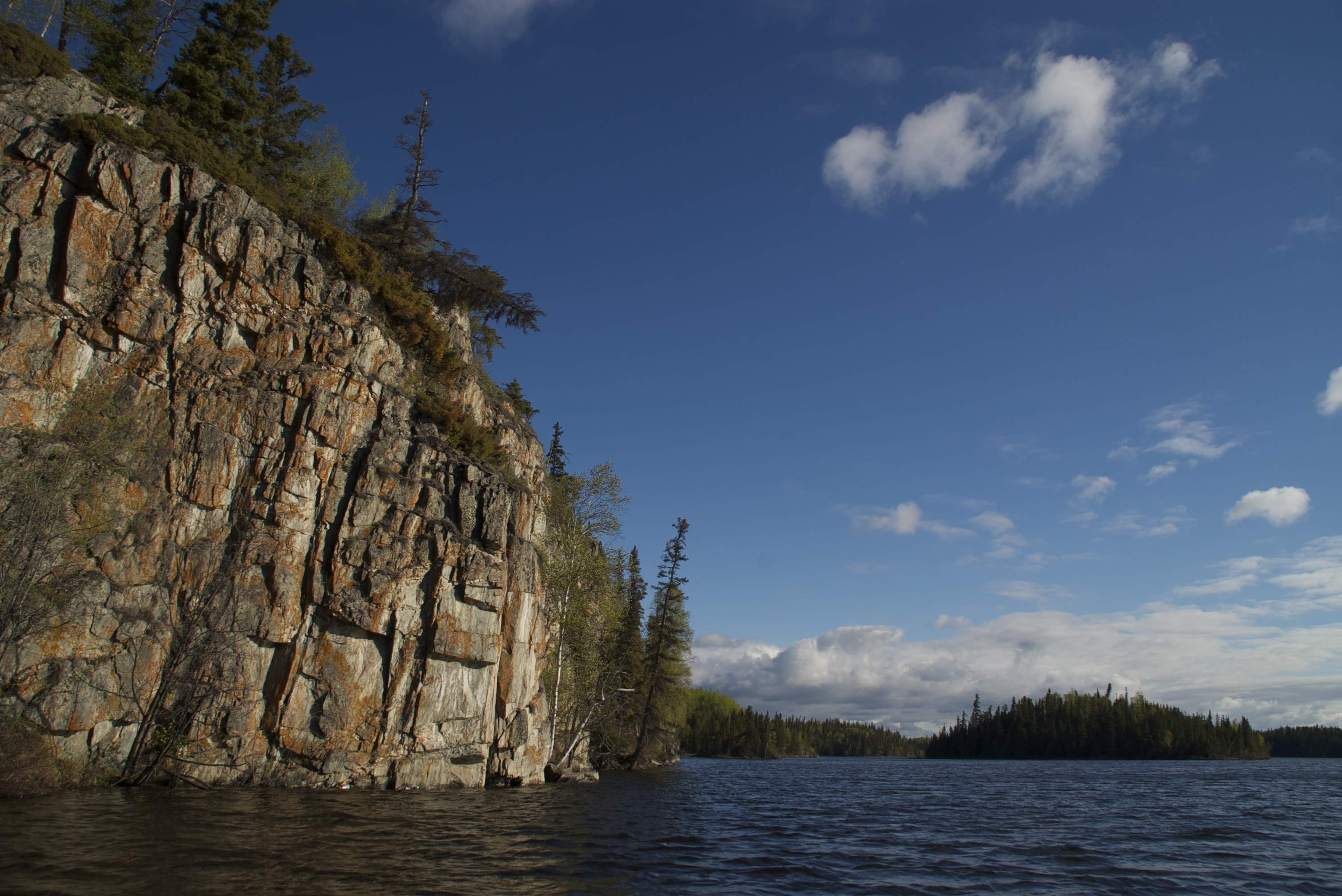
A Pre-Cambrian Shield cliff on Thompson Lake

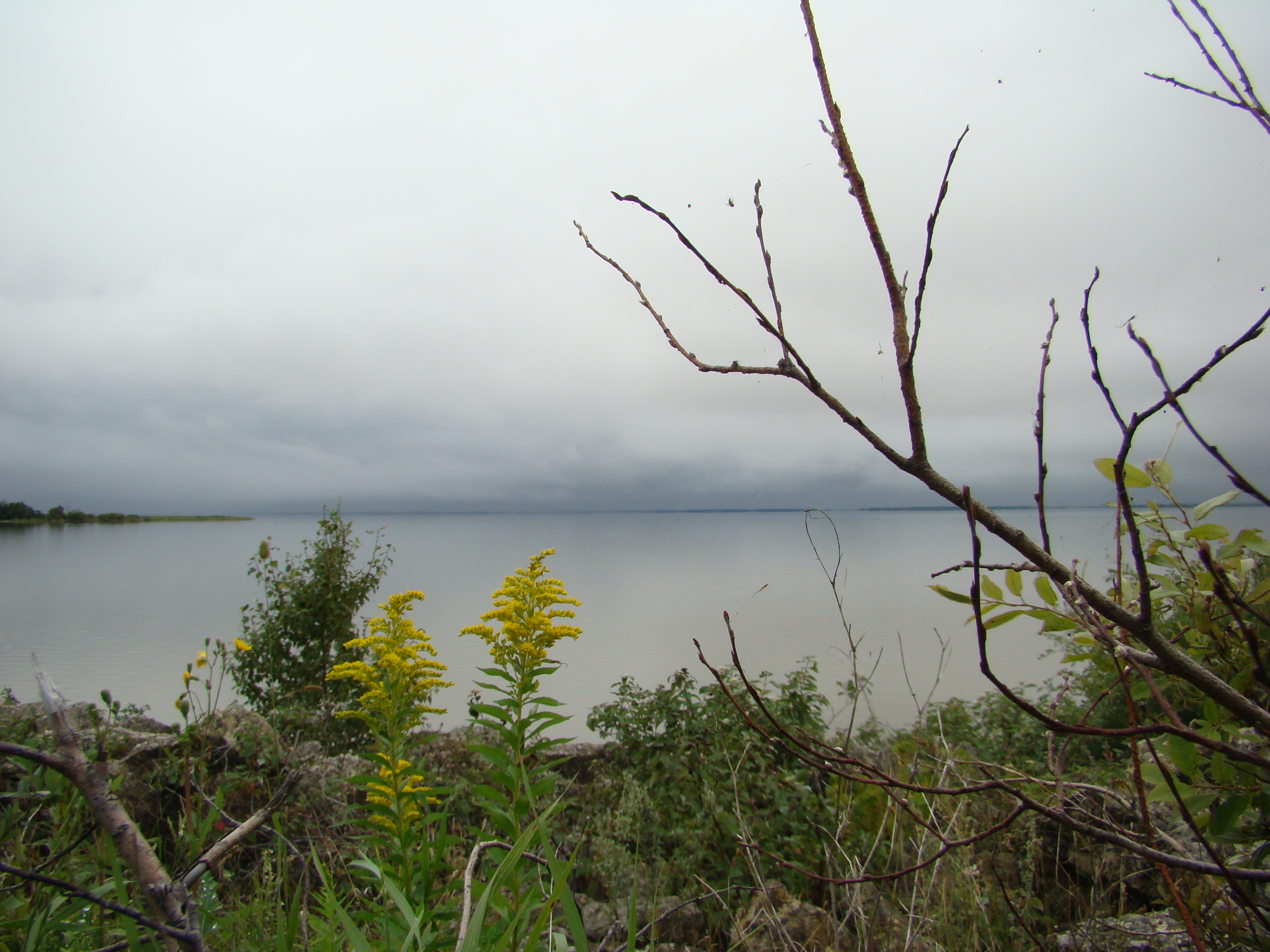
Hecla-Grindstone Provincial Park on Lake Winnipeg

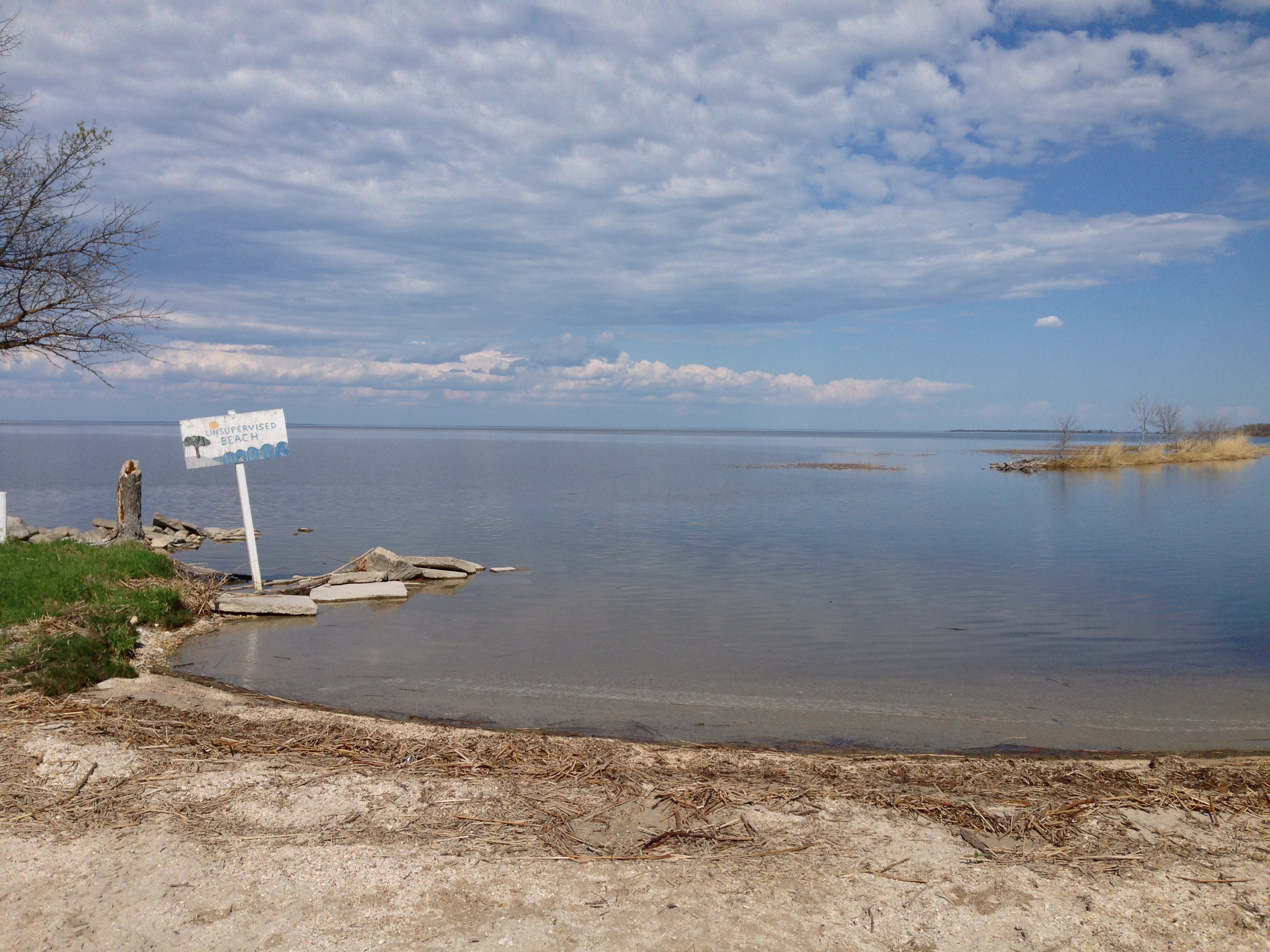
Lake Winnipegosis from Winnipegosis Beach

== A ==
- Lake Agassiz
- Alberts Lake
- Antons Lake
- Armit Lake
- Assean Lake
- Aswapiswanan Lake
- Lake Athapapuskow

== B ==
- Bennett Lake
- Beresford Lake
- Bernic Lake
- Betula Lake
- Big Island Lake
- Big Whiteshell Lake
- Birch Lake
- Birds Hill Lake
- Bolton Lake
- Lac du Bonnet
- Boon Lake
- Booster Lake
- Bowden Lake
- Boundary Lake
- Brereton Lake
- Lac Brochet
- Bryan Lake
- Buckland Lake
- Burge Lake
- Burton Lake

== C ==
- Cabin Lake
- Caddy Lake
- Camp Lake
- Lake Cargill
- Cedar Lake
- Chicken Lake
- Clear Lake
- Clearwater Lake
- Cormorant Lake
- Cosgrove Lake
- Crescent Lake
- Cross Lake
- Crowduck Lake
- Culdesac Lake

== D ==
- Dauphin Lake
- Darsh Lake
- De Gueldres Lake
- Derkiewicz Lake
- Lake Devonian
- Dog Lake

== E ==
- Echo Lake
- Eden Lake
- Egenolf Lake
- Egg Lake
- Elton Lake

== F ==
- Falcon Lake
- Falcons Bow Lake
- Fisher Lake
- Fox Lake
- Foxwarren Lake

== G ==
- Gauer Lake
- Gods Lake
- Good Lake
- Granville Lake

== H ==
- Holt Lake
- Horseshoe Lake

== I ==
- Island Lake

== J ==
- Lake James
- Jessica Lake
- Joey Lake

== K ==
- Kakat Lake
- Kakwusis Lake
- Kasmere Lake
- Kawakwunwit Lake
- Kingfisher Lake
- Kinsmen Lake
- Kipahigan Lake
- Kiskitto Lake
- Kiskittogisu Lake
- Kisseynew Lake
- Kississing Lake
- Knee Lake
- Kasinimnikwanapikak Lake

== L ==
- Leo Lake
- Limestone Lake
- Lindals Lake
- Little Bolton Lake
- Little Limestone Lake
- Liz Lake
- Lizard Lake
- Lone Island Lake
- Lonely Lake
- Loon Lake
- Lost Fry Lake
- Lake Louise
- Lynx Lake

== M ==
- Mackie Lake
- Lake Manitoba
- Marchand Lake
- Mid Lake
- Minty Ice Lake
- McKay Lake
- Minnedosa Lake
- Mitatut Lake
- Molson Lake
- Montago Lake
- Moose Lake
- Mud Turtle Lake
- Muir Lake
- Munroe Lake
- Murray Lake
- Musketasonan Lake

== N ==
- Namew Lake
- Nao Lake
- Naosap Lake
- Naosap Mud Lake
- Natalie Lake
- Nejanilini Lake
- Neso Lake
- Nesosap Lake
- Netley Lake
- Nikotwasik Lake
- Nisto Lake
- Nistosap Lake
- Niyanun Lake
- Norman Mitchell Lake
- Norris Lake
- Nueltin Lake

== O ==
- Oak Hammock Marsh
- Oak Lake
- Olafson Lake
- One Stone Lake
- Ospawagon Lake
- Oxford Lake

== P ==
- Paint Lake
- Payuk Lake
- Payukosap Lake
- Pekwachnamaykoskwaskwaypinwanik Lake
- Pelican Lake
- Persian Lake
- Playgreen Lake
- Prime Lake
- Pukatawagan Lake
- Putahow Lake

== R ==
- Red Deer Lake
- Red Sucker Lake
- Reindeer Lake
- Rice Lake
- Rock Lake
- Roderick Lake
- Rushforth Lake

== S ==
- Lake St. Martin
- Sandy Lake
- Schist Lake
- Shethanei Lake
- Setting Lake
- Shellmouth Reservoir
- Shoal Lakes
- Sipiwesk Lake
- Sisipuk Lake
- Snowshoe Lake
- Southern Indian Lake
- South Lake
- Split Lake
- Springer Lake
- St. Malo Reservoir
- Stephenfield Lake
- Stephens Lake
- Stony Lake
- Stonys Lake
- Stupid Lake
- Swamp Lake
- Swan Lake

== T ==
- Tapukok Lake
- Thompson Lake
- Toews Lake
- Touchwood Lake
- Twin Lake

== U ==
- Unruh Lake
- Uyenanao Lake

== V ==
- Vermilyea Lake

== W ==
- Lake Wahtopanah
- Wallace Lake
- War Eagle Lake
- Wargatie Lake
- Wasp Lake
- Waterhen Lake
- Weir Lake
- West Hawk Lake
- West Lynn Lake
- White Lake
- Whitefish Lake
- Whitemouth Lake
- Lake Winnipeg
- Lake Winnipegosis
- Lake of the Woods
- Woollard Lake

== See also ==
- List of rivers of Manitoba
- Geography of Manitoba
- Manitoba memorial lakes
