= Stony Lake =

Stony Lake may refer to:

== Lakes ==
- Stony Lake (Ontario), Canada
- Stony Lake (Manitoba), Canada
- Stony Lake (Hubbard County, Minnesota)
- Stony Lake (New York), in Lewis County
- Barrier Lake (British Columbia), Canada
- Rollway Lake, also known as Stony Lake, in Newaygo County, Michigan, USA
- Stony Lake in Granite County, Montana

== Communities ==
- Stony Lake, Michigan, unincorporated community in Oceana County, Michigan, USA

== See also ==
- Stone Lake (disambiguation)
