= Stone Lake =

Stone Lake may refer to:

== Populated places ==
- Stone Lake, Wisconsin, a town in Washburn County, Wisconsin, USA
- Stone Lake (community), Wisconsin, an unincorporated community, USA

== Lakes ==
- Stone Lake in Ashley County, Arkansas
- Stone Lake in Faulkner County, Arkansas
- Stone Lake (New Mexico), a lake in New Mexico

== Parks ==
- Stone Lake (California), a park property in Sacramento County, California, USA

== See also ==
- Stony Lake (disambiguation)
- Big Stone Lake, Minnesota/South Dakota, USA
- Redstone Lake (disambiguation), Ontario, Canada
- Three Stone Lake, Nova Scotia, Canada
