= List of mines in Manitoba =

This is a list of mines in Manitoba, Canada. Operational mines are bolded.

Mine	Major commodities	Coordinates	Associated town	Owner	Dates	Comments	References
Birchtree Mine	Nickel	55°42′06″N 97°55′37″W	Thompson	Vale	1965-1978; 1989-		
Bernic Lake mine	Tantalum						
Bucko Lake Mine	Nickel		Wabowden	Crowflight Minerals	2009-		
Sherritt-Gordon Mine	Zinc, copper	55.16985°N 101.33465°W	Sherridon	Sherritt International	1931-1951		
Tanco Mine	Caesium, Tantalum	50.429955°N 95.446472°W	Bernic Lake	Cabot Corporation	1929-2002		

Hudson Bay Mine Copper, Zinc, Gold Flin Flon, Manitoba | | |[ 1911 gold mine bissett]
