= Camp Lake (Manitoba) =

Waterbody in western Manitoba, Canada

- Location of the lake in Manitoba Camp Lake (Canada)
- Location: Sherridon, Manitoba
- Coordinates: 55.13°N 101.10°W
- Primary outflows: Kississing Lake
- Basin countries: Canada
- Max. length: 2.5 kilometres (1.6 mi)
- Max. width: .5 kilometres (0.31 mi)

Camp Lake is a waterbody in western Manitoba, Canada.

== Description and history ==
Camp Lake is located in Sherridon, Manitoba, adjacent to Kississing Lake. A weir separates the two lakes.

Between 1931 and 1951, operators of the Sherritt-Gordon Mine deposited 7.7 mega tons of tailings in close proximity to the lake. The lake became polluted from contaminants in the tailings and the contamination of Camp Lake spread into Kississing Lake.

Remediation efforts started in 2009 and including moving mine tailings from Camp Lake into Kississing Lake in 2013 and 2015.

Water quality testing undertaken by the Manitoba Metis Federation in 2021 identified metal contamination in the lake.

== See also ==
- List of lakes of Manitoba
