= Weir Lake =

Weir Lake may refer to:

- Lake Weir, in Florida, United States
- Weir Lake (Manitoba), in Manitoba, Canada
