= Lynx Lake =

Lynx Lake may refer to several lakes in North America:

In the United States

- Lynx Lake (Arizona)
- Lynx Lake (Alaska)

In Canada

- Lynx Lake (Manitoba)
- Lynx Lake (Northwest Territories)
