= Kississing Lake =

Lake in Manitoba, Canada

- Location of the lake in Manitoba Kississing Lake (Canada)
- Location: Div. No. 21, western Manitoba
- Coordinates: 55°10′11″N 101°20′02″W
- Primary inflows: Kississing River, Camp Lake
- Primary outflows: Kississing River
- Basin countries: Canada
- Surface area: 370 km^{2} (141 mi^{2})
- Surface elevation: 312 m (1,024 ft)

Kississing Lake is a lake in northwestern Manitoba, Canada, approximately 30 kilometres (19 mi) northeast of Flin Flon. The Kississing River drains it northeast into Flatrock Lake on the Churchill River. The community of Sherridon is on its eastern shores, and the Kississing Lake Indian Reserve is on the western side.

Kississing is a Cree name meaning 'cold'. It has historically also been called Cold, Kissisino, or Takipy Lake.

The lake is the main resource for Sherridon residents, since it is home to several fishing lodges and outfitters, and used by commercial fishermen, trappers, and wild rice growers.

== Geography ==
Kississing Lake lies near the height of land on the southern edge of the drainage basin of the Churchill River, and is part of the Hudson Bay watershed. Although its total area is only 370 square kilometres (141 mi^{2}), the lake spreads over a considerable extent of territory, due to long irregular bays and arms that extend on all sides of Kississing Lake. Capes, points, and peninsulas of all lengths, sizes and shapes project into it. The main part of the lake, as well as all its bays and arms are filled with numerous rocky islands, both large and small.

Since Kississing Lake lies close to the height of land, none of the streams in its vicinity are large, and the country is poorly drained. A great many short streams draining small lakes or chains of lakes flow into it, but its principal affluent is the Kississing River, which originates to the south at Kisseynew Lake and enters at its southwest angle. Kississing Lake is drained by the continuation of the Kississing River which flows out at its northeastern arm and follows a northeasterly course, through many lakes, to its junction with the Churchill River.

Kississing Lake lies on the Pre-Cambrian rocks of the Canadian Shield. The surrounding country has low elevation, with isolated rocky hills rising from 15 to 76 metres (50 to 250 ft) above the general level, although hills of the latter height are uncommon. Interspersed between the hills are lakes and swamps. Typical trees found there are spruce, jack pine, poplar, birch, and tamarack.

== History ==
In 1822, the Hudson's Bay Company (HBC) set up a fur-trade post on the north arm of the lake (then called Cold Lake) to take over the trade from the Green Lake Post that was closed that same year. By 1870, the Cold Lake Post was abandoned.

In the late 19th century, a Métis road allowance community developed on the lake, known as Cold Lake.

The first geological exploration of Kississing Lake was done in 1899 by D. B. Dowling of the Geological Survey of Canada. The discovery of mineral deposits in the Flin Flon area stimulated interest in the whole region, and prospectors worked their way northward to Kississing Lake, guided by Métis from the Cold Lake community. In 1923, deposits of copper-zinc sulphides were staked on the east shore of the lake, which were developed into the Sherritt-Gordon Mine. The Town of Sherridon formed nearby. Following the discovery of these minerals, the lake was mapped by the Topographical Survey of Canada in 1928. Around the same time, J. F. Wright of the Geological Survey undertook a further survey, mapping the area around the lake and examining the various deposits that had been discovered up to that time.

The Sherridon mine closed in 1951, after having processed approximately 7.7 Mt of pyritic ore. Weathering of the mine's tailings has released sulphate, metals, and acid into surface and ground water ever since, which run into and contaminated the adjacent Camp Lake. When levels on Camp Lake are high, such as during seasonal spring melts, its rusty-coloured water leaches into the clear blue Kississing Lake. High levels of contaminants have been found in the bottom sediments of Kississing Lake extending over an area of 9.5 square kilometres (3.7 sq mi) from Camp Lake's inflow.

== See also ==
- List of lakes of Manitoba
