= Leo Lake (Manitoba) =

Lake in Manitoba, Canada

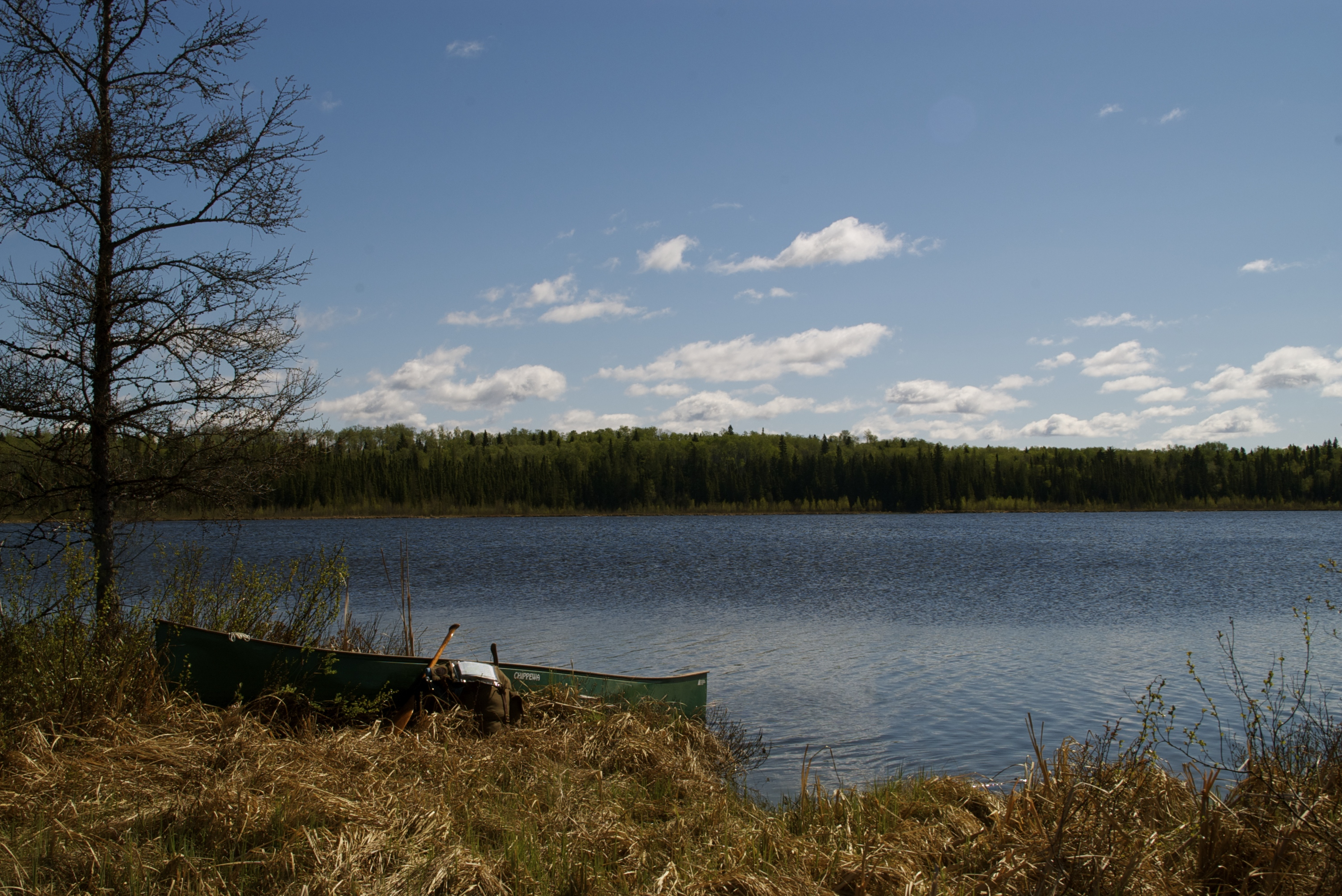
- Leo Lake looking west from the portage head to Flintoba Lake

- Location of the lake in Manitoba Leo Lake (Canada)
- Location: Manitoba
- Coordinates: 54°47′24″N 101°33′34″W
- Lake type: Glacial Lake
- Primary inflows: none
- Primary outflows: Thompson Lake
- Basin countries: Canada
- Max. length: 0.8 km (0.50 mi)
- Max. width: 0.5 km (0.31 mi)
- Shore length^{1}: 2.31 km (1.44 mi)
- Surface elevation: 314 m (1,030 ft)
- Islands: 0
- ^{1} Shore length is not a well-defined measure.

Leo Lake is a small glacial lake approximately 15 kilometres (9.3 mi) northeast of Bakers Narrows which drains into Thompson Lake. It is part of the Nelson River watershed, in the Hudson Bay drainage basin in the Northern Region of Manitoba, Canada.

== Description ==
The lakes sits in Churchill River Upland portion of the Midwestern Canadian Shield forests and is surrounded by mixed forest with stands of black spruce, white spruce, jack pine, and trembling aspen. The shoreline is poorly drained areas of muskeg.

== Name ==
The name was officially adopted in 1979.

== Canoe route ==
Leo Lake is part of the "Mistik Creek Loop", a well-known remote canoe trip which is 80 kilometres (50 mi) in total length and can be paddled in four days. The route begins and ends at Bakers Narrows and from Leo lake there are portages north to Alberts Lake and south to Flintoba Lake.

== See also ==
- List of lakes of Manitoba
