= Mackie Lake =

Mackie Lake may refer to:

- Mackie Lake (Manitoba), Canada
- Mackie Lake (Ontario), Canada, north of Plevna, Ontario
- Mackie Lake, Wisconsin, United States - see List of lakes in Wisconsin (Polk County)
