= Weir River =

Weir River may refer to:

== Australia ==
- Weir River (Queensland), Australia, a tributary of Barwon River
- Weir River, Queensland, a locality in the Western Downs Region, Australia

== United States ==
- Weir River (Massachusetts), U.S., which ends in Boston Harbor
- Weir River (Manitoba), a tributary of the Nelson River
