= Bunibonibee Cree Nation =

First Nation of Manitoba

Coordinates: 54°55′00″N 95°19′49″W

- Band No. 301
- ᐸᓂᑇᓂᐱᐩ panipwânipiy
- People: Woodland Cree
- Treaty: Treaty 5
- Headquarters: Oxford House, Manitoba

Population (2025)
- On reserve: 1800
- On other land: 65
- Off reserve: 637
- Total population: 2502

Government
- Chief: Richard Brian Hart Jr.

Tribal Council
- Keewatin Tribal Council

Location of Oxford House in Manitoba

Bunibonibee Cree Nation (Cree: ᐸᓂᑇᓂᐱᐩ, panipwânipiy), formerly known as Oxford House First Nation and as Oxford House Band of Indians, is a First Nation located along the eastern shoreline of Oxford Lake at the headwaters of the Hayes River and is approximately 950 kilometres (590 mi) northeast of Winnipeg, Manitoba.

The residents are predominantly Woodland Cree and, more specifically Rocky Cree (Asinīskāwiyiniwak). The First Nation is a signatory to the 1909 Treaty 5 Adhesion. Bunibonibee Cree Nation has offices in Oxford House, Manitoba.

The registered population as of August 2013 was 2,892, of which 2,424 resided on their own Indian reserve.

== Governance ==
The First Nation's governing council are elected under the Indian Act Electoral System, Section 74, of the Indian Act of Canada. consisting of a Chief and six Councillors for a four-year term. The current administration, whose term expires December 4, 2023, are Chief Richard Hart, and Councillors Howard Grieves Jr, Donald Hart, Marion Wood, Anthony Weenusk, Paul Weenusk Sr, and an unfilled Councillor position due to the death of Gabriel Hart on April 16, 2021.

The band council of Bunibonibee Cree Nation, in turn, is a member of Keewatin Tribal Council (KTC), a regional technical/political council; Manitoba Keewatinowi Okimakanak (MKO), a northern regional political council; the Assembly of Manitoba Chiefs (AMC), the provincial political council; and Assembly of First Nations (AFN), the federal political council.

== Indian Reserves ==
The First Nation have reserved for themselves 13 separate tracts, of which Oxford House 24 IR serves as their main reserve, containing the Settlement of Oxford House, Manitoba.

- High Hill Lake IR — 422 hectares (1,040 acres)
- Kisipikamak IR — 1,879 hectares (4,640 acres)
- Munro Lake IR — 1,491 hectares (3,680 acres)
- Notin Sakahekun IR — 2,822.40 hectares (6,974.3 acres)
- Opischikonayak Nation IR — 254.80 hectares (629.6 acres)
- Oxford House 24 IR — 4,876.20 hectares (12,049.4 acres)
- Oxford House 24A IR — 146 hectares (360 acres)
- Oxford House 24B IR — 1,737.60 hectares (4,293.7 acres)
- Oxford House 24C IR — 402 hectares (990 acres)
- Oxford House 24D IR — 4.50 hectares (11.1 acres)
- Oxford Lake North Shore IR — 1,385 hectares (3,420 acres)
- Wapisew Lake IR — 71 hectares (180 acres)
- Whitemud Lake IR — 2,068 hectares (5,110 acres)
