= Seal River (Manitoba) =

- Course and location of the mouth of the Seal River in Manitoba
- Etymology: Named for the harbour seals that are found up to 200 km (120 mi) up the river.

Location
- Country: Canada
- Province: Manitoba
- Region: Northern Manitoba

Physical characteristics
- Source: Shethanei Lake
  - coordinates: 58°47′59″N 97°49′59″W
- Mouth: Hudson Bay
  - coordinates: 59°4′19″N 94°47′56″W
- Length: 260 km (160 mi)
- Basin size: 50,000 km^{2} (19,000 sq mi)

The Seal River is a river in the Northern Region of Manitoba, Canada. It travels 260 kilometres (160 mi) from Shethanei Lake to the Hudson Bay. The river was nominated for the Canadian Heritage Rivers System in 1987 and was officially listed in 1992. In January 2024, the Governments of Canada and Manitoba and Members of the Sayisi Dene First Nation, O-Pipon-Na-Piwin Cree Nation, Northlands Denesuline First Nation and Barren Lands First Nation reached an agreement to designate the watershed as an Indigenous and community conserved area.

== Geography ==
At a length of 260 kilometers (162 mi), the Seal River is one of the four major rivers in Northern Manitoba, and it is the northernmost and only one that contains no dams. Its drainage basin is 50,000 square kilometres (19,000 sq mi) in area. The river is far removed from any human populations in the isolated wilderness. The nearest settlements are Churchill and the small Tadoule Lake. Churchill is about 45 kilometres (28 mi) south of the mouth of the river along the Hudson Bay, while Tadoule Lake is far inland near the source. There are no actual settlements or permanent human inhabitants along the Seal River. The nearest permanent road to connect Seal River to the rest of the Canadian populace is 275 kilometres (171 mi) southwest of the river. While the source of the Seal River is Shethanei Lake, that water comes from the North Seal River and South Seal River, which empty into the lake. Those two rivers are actually much longer and contain more water than the Seal River.

The river flows through a mix of boreal forests at the southernmost edge of Canada's tundra. Because it travels through this transition zone, the river travels through dense forests, as well as portions of the barren and rocky subarctic wilderness. The course of the river is inconsistent and very dangerous to navigate. The river has no human uses, except for the very few skilled travelers on rafts or canoes who brave the treacherous waters each year.

== History ==
Seal River was nominated for the Canadian Heritage Rivers System in 1987 because of its natural and ecological importance, not its importance to people in the development of the area. The whole course of the river is entirely undeveloped and far removed from any regular human intervention. The river is considered one of the last great wild rivers of Canada.

While the river served little use to the early European colonizers of the Hudson Bay region, the river itself served more importance for First Nations many centuries ago. The first European to navigate the Seal River was Samuel Hearne, who walked the route of the river in 1771. Early Europeans themselves saw no use for the river, while the only traces of their existence in the area were short-lived mining camps near the mouth of the river that date back only to the 1940s. While there are few historical remnants of European existence in the area, there are many artifacts belonging to the Chipewyan and even earlier Talteilei tribes. They regularly came to the river to hunt the vast amounts of caribou. Traces of First Nation presence in the area dates back up to 7,000 years ago.

Because there are no public travel accommodations near the river, access to the river can only be provided through various far-off airports — in which Churchill Airport and Tadoule Lake Airport are the closest. The rest of the journey to the river must be hiked. Charter tour groups of the river and the surrounding area are rare and very expensive. Because of the extreme isolation of the river and its dangerous topography, very few adventurers travel to the river on a yearly basis. The rivers owes its preservation to the harsh wilderness, infertile soil, and very cold climate, which have made the area very inhospitable to even the most experienced travelers.

== See also ==
- List of rivers of Manitoba
