= Taltheilei =

Taltheilei may refer to:

- Taltheilei Narrows Airport
- Taltheilei Narrows Water Aerodrome
- Taltheilei Shale tradition, the name given to the culture and people of the late prehistoric western subarctic culture, dated between 750 BC and AD 1000.
