= Lynx Lake (Manitoba) =

Glacial lake in Manitoba, Canada

- Location of the lake in Manitoba Lynx Lake (Canada)
- Location: Manitoba
- Coordinates: 54°36′34″N 101°33′24″W
- Lake type: Glacial Lake
- Primary inflows: None
- Primary outflows: Lake Athapapuskow
- Basin countries: Canada
- Max. length: 1.6 km (0.99 mi)
- Max. width: .6 km (0.37 mi)
- Shore length^{1}: 5.5 km (3.4 mi)
- Surface elevation: 304 m (997 ft)
- Islands: 7
- ^{1} Shore length is not a well-defined measure.

Lynx Lake is a glacial lake approximately 10 kilometres (6.2 mi) southeast of Bakers Narrows which drains into Lake Athapapuskow. It is part of the Nelson River watershed, in the Hudson Bay drainage basin in the Northern Region of Manitoba, Canada. The lakes sits in Churchill River Upland portion of the Midwestern Canadian Shield forests and is surrounded by mixed forest with stands of black spruce, white spruce, jack pine, and trembling aspen. The shoreline is characterized by steeply sloping irregular rock ridges and poorly drained areas of muskeg. The lake contains northern pike.

The name was officially adopted in 1941.

== See also ==
- List of lakes of Manitoba
