= Buffalo pound =

Hunting device used by Native Americans

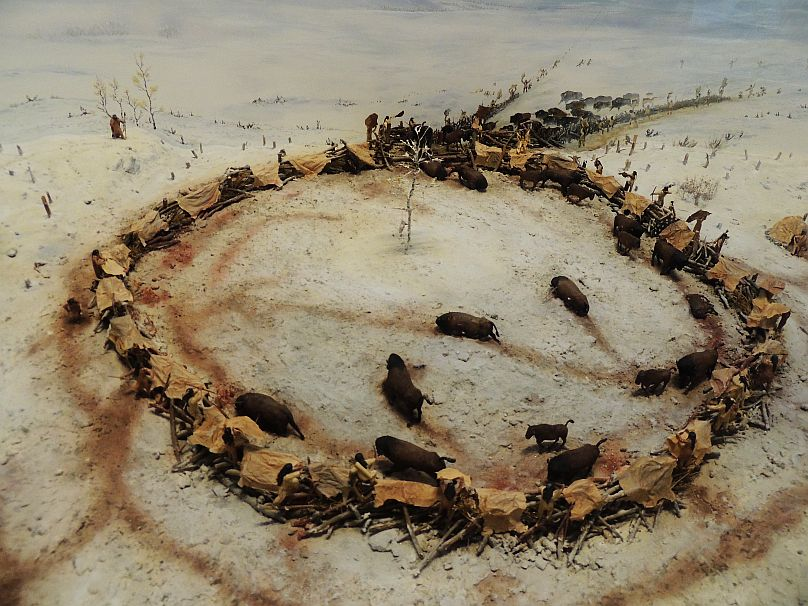
Diorama of a buffalo pound at the Royal Alberta Museum

The buffalo pound was a hunting device constructed by native peoples of the North American plains for the purpose of entrapping and slaughtering American bison, also known as buffalo. It consisted of a circular corral at the terminus of a flared chute through which buffalo were herded and thereby trapped. David Mandelbaum's The Plains Cree contains diagrams and a complete description of the construction and use of such a pound.

In 1758, explorer and fur trader Joseph Smith was the first European to record the use of a buffalo pound while travelling to the Assiniboine River.

The common Cree name "Poundmaker", refers to someone who makes buffalo pounds.

== See also ==
- Buffalo Pound Provincial Park, a park in south-eastern Saskatchewan, which takes its name from the above term.
