= Kiskitto Lake =

Lake in Manitoba, Canada

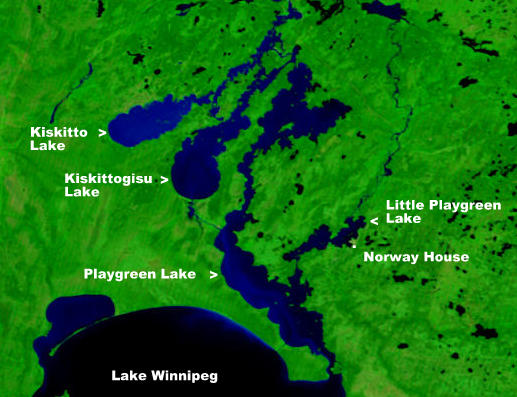
- Kiskitto Lake north of Lake Winnipeg

- Location of the lake in Manitoba Kiskitto Lake (Canada)
- Location: Division No. 22, Manitoba
- Coordinates: 54°16′N 98°30′W
- Primary inflows: Nelson River
- Primary outflows: Nelson River
- Basin countries: Canada
- Max. length: 57 km (35 mi)
- Settlements: None

Kiskitto Lake is a lake in the province of Manitoba in Canada north of Lake Winnipeg. The lake is a part of the Nelson River watershed and is located northwest of Kiskittogisu Lake on the west channel of the Nelson River. The west channel flows through the north ends of Playgreen Lake, Kiskittogisu Lake and Kiskitto Lake into Cross Lake at the Manitoba Hydro's Jenpeg Generating Station and Dam. The lake is about 57 km (35 miles) long.

== See also ==
- List of lakes of Manitoba
