= Snowshoe Lake (Kenora District) =

Lake in Ontario and Manitoba, Canada

- Location of the lake in Ontario Snowshoe Lake (Canada)
- Location: Kenora District, Ontario; Division No. 1, Manitoba
- Coordinates: 50°34′31″N 95°07′09″W
- Primary inflows: Bird River from Chase Lake
- Primary outflows: Bird River to McGregor Lake
- Basin countries: Canada
- Max. length: 9.0 km (5.6 mi)
- Max. width: 3.1 km (1.9 mi)
- Surface elevation: 322 m (1,056 ft)

Snowshoe Lake is a lake in Kenora District, Ontario, and in Division No. 1, Manitoba, Canada, and part of the Nelson River drainage basin. It is about 9 kilometres (5.6 mi) long and 3.1 kilometres (1.9 mi) wide, and lies at an elevation of 322 metres (1,056 ft). The primary inflow is the Bird River from Chase Lake, and the primary outflow is the Bird River, to McGregor Lake, which flows via the Winnipeg River and the Nelson River into Hudson Bay. Small portions of the lake on the northwest, west and southwest, including the Bird River outflow, are in Nopiming Provincial Park in Manitoba.

== See also ==
- List of lakes in Ontario
- List of lakes of Manitoba
