= Shethanei Lake =

Lake in Manitoba, Canada

- Location of the lake in Manitoba Shethanei Lake (Canada)
- Location: Manitoba
- Coordinates: 58°48′N 97°50′W
- Primary outflows: Seal River
- Basin countries: Canada
- Settlements: None

Shethanei Lake is a lake in northern Manitoba, Canada. Located southwest of Caribou River Park Reserve, it is the source of the Seal River.

== See also ==
- List of lakes of Manitoba
