= Schist Lake (Manitoba) =

Lake in Manitoba, Canada

- Manistikwan, Devil's Head Lake
- Location of Schist Lake in Manitoba Schist Lake (Canada)
- Location: Manitoba, Canada
- Coordinates: 54°39′N 101°47.5′W
- Type: Glacial
- Primary inflows: Big Island Creek, Ross Creek
- Primary outflows: Schist Creek
- Basin countries: Canada
- Surface area: 22.6 km^{2} (8.7 sq mi)
- Max. depth: 30 m (98 ft)

Schist Lake is approximately 3 kilometres (1.9 mi) southeast of Flin Flon, Manitoba. The lake has a maximum depth of 30 metres (98 ft). It is composed of four main channels, the West Arm, Northwest Arm, Inlet Arm and Northeast Arm. It drains into Lake Athapapuskow via Schist Creek and is part of the Nelson River watershed. The Flin Flon/Channing Water Aerodrome is located on the north end of the Northwest Arm.

The name comes from the predominant type of metamorphic rock which surrounds the lake, part of the Canadian Shield. It was originally called Manistikiwan which is Cree for "Devil's Head Lake" This name was later applied to nearby Big Island Lake.

== See also ==
- List of lakes of Manitoba
