= Wargatie Lake =

- Dummy Lake
- Location in Manitoba Wargatie Lake (Canada)
- Location: Manitoba
- Coordinates: 50°36′33″N 100°20′35″W
- Lake type: Glacial lake
- Surface area: 1.6 km^{2} (0.62 sq mi)
- Max. depth: 12 m (39 ft)
- Surface elevation: 184 m (604 ft)

Wargatie Lake is a glacial lake in Manitoba, in Canada, formerly known as Dummy Lake.

== Ecology ==
The Municipality of Harrison Park manages the lake, offering recreational fishing for northern pike, walleye, and yellow perch. Wargatie Lake also supports a large population of the northern leopard frog, a Species of Special Concern in Canada; the lake is believed to provide an overwintering habitat for the frogs.

== Hydronymy ==
The lake was named for the family of Onofrey Wargatie, whose 1910 homestead was located nearby. Members of the family were deaf-mute, leading to the original name, Dummy Lake. In 2000, the derogatory name was rescinded and replaced with the current name, which "commemorates the family more appropriately."

== See also ==
- List of lakes of Manitoba

== Bibliography ==
- Gazetteer of Canada: Manitoba (PDF) (Fifth ed.). Centre for Topographic Information, Geomatics Canada, Natural Resources Canada, and the Land Information Branch, Manitoba Natural Resources. 1999. ISBN 978-0-660-60786-3.
- Geographical Names of Manitoba. Manitoba Conservation. 2000. ISBN 978-0-7711-1517-2.
