= Woollard Lake =

Lake in Manitoba, Canada

- Location of the lake in Manitoba Woollard Lake (Canada)
- Location: Manitoba
- Coordinates: 50°43′35″N 95°27′32″W
- Basin countries: Canada
- Surface area: 0.51 km^{2} (0.20 sq mi)
- Surface elevation: 317 m (1,040 ft)

Woollard Lake is in south-eastern Manitoba, Canada, and borders Nopiming Provincial Park. It is approximately 127 acres (51 ha) in size.

The lake was named after the Robert B. Woollard family in honour of his military service during World War I.

== See also ==
- List of lakes of Manitoba
