= Roderick Lake (Manitoba–Saskatchewan) =

Lake in Western Canada

- Location in Saskatchewan Roderick Lake (Canada)
- Location: Northern Manitoba and Northern Saskatchewan
- Coordinates: 56°00′45″N 102°01′01″W
- Part of: Churchill River drainage basin
- Basin countries: Canada
- Max. length: 6.1 km (3.8 mi)
- Max. width: 2.2 km (1.4 mi)
- Surface elevation: 337 m (1,106 ft)
- Settlements: None

Roderick Lake is a lake on the border between Manitoba and Saskatchewan, Canada. The lake is in the Hudson Bay drainage basin. Except for the north-east end, most of the lake is in Saskatchewan.

There are several unnamed inflows, and the primary outflow, at the north-east, is an unnamed stream that flows south to Loon Lake on the Churchill River, a tributary of Hudson Bay.

== See also ==
- List of lakes of Saskatchewan
- List of lakes of Manitoba
