= Putahow Lake =

Lake in Manitoba, Canada

- Location of the lake in Manitoba Putahow Lake (Canada)
- Location: Division No. 23, North-West Manitoba
- Coordinates: 59°54′N 100°40′W
- Basin countries: Canada

Putahow Lake is a lake in north-west Manitoba near the provincial boundary with Nunavut, Canada. Putahow Lake is a lake with an average elevation of 321 metres above sea level. Mean temperature range is from -30 deg C in January to +14 deg C in July.

== See also ==
- List of lakes of Manitoba
