= Stupid Lake =

Lake in Manitoba, Canada

- Location in Manitoba Stupid Lake (Canada)
- Location: Northern Manitoba
- Coordinates: 55°39′49″N 93°26′52″W
- Part of: Hayes River drainage basin
- Basin countries: Canada
- Max. length: 2 km (1.2 mi)
- Max. width: 1.2 km (0.75 mi)
- Surface elevation: 151 m (495 ft)
- Settlements: None

Stupid Lake is a freshwater lake in Manitoba, Canada. The lake is located near the Hayes River. It has an elevation of 151 metres (495 ft) above sea level. The closest settlement is Shamattawa, at 88 kilometres (55 mi) away.

== See also ==
- List of lakes of Manitoba
