= Playgreen Lake =

Lake in Manitoba, Canada

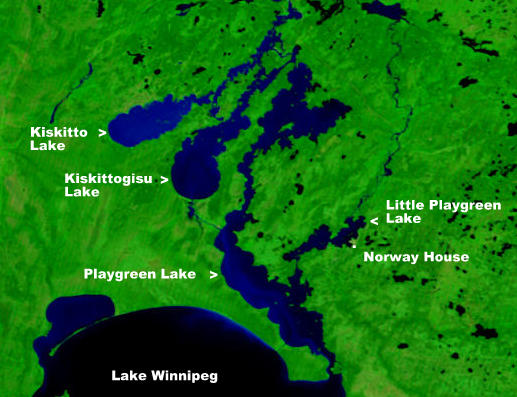
- Playgreen Lake north of Lake Winnipeg

- Location of the lake in Manitoba Playgreen Lake (Canada)
- Location: Division No. 22, Manitoba
- Coordinates: 54°02′N 98°14′W
- Primary inflows: Nelson River
- Primary outflows: Nelson River
- Catchment area: 5,322 km^{2} (2,055 sq mi)
- Basin countries: Canada
- Surface area: 657 km^{2} (254 sq mi)
- Average depth: 4 m (13 ft)
- Max. depth: 18 m (59 ft)
- Water volume: 2.76 km^{3} (2,240,000 acre⋅ft)
- Residence time: 0.04 years
- Shore length^{1}: 471 km (293 mi)
- Surface elevation: 217 m (712 ft)
- Settlements: None
- ^{1} Shore length is not a well-defined measure.

Playgreen Lake or Play Green Lake, is a lake in the province of Manitoba in Canada. The lake covers an area of 657 square kilometres (254 sq mi) and it is a part of the Nelson River watershed. The lake is the ninth largest lake in the province. It is located along the Nelson River some 10 kilometres (6.2 mi) north from the north end of Lake Winnipeg. It was first mapped by noted British surveyor, map-maker, chief fur trader and the explorer Peter Fidler in 1809.

== Hydrography ==
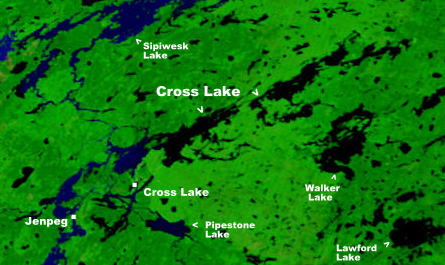
Cross Lake north of Playgreen Lake

The Nelson River flows into Playgreen Lake from Lake Winnipeg then flows from two channels into Cross Lake.

The east channel and the Jack River flow from the southeast portion of the lake into Little Playgreen Lake then the Nelson east channel continues in a northerly direction passing through Pipestone Lake on its way to Cross Lake. The Echimamish River in this section leads to the Hayes River and York Factory on the Hudson Bay part of early Canadian canoe routes important during the North American fur trade.

The west channel flows out of the north ends of Playgreen Lake, Kiskittogisu Lake and Kiskitto Lake into Cross Lake at the Manitoba Hydro's Jenpeg Generating Station and Dam.

== See also ==
- List of lakes of Manitoba
