= Pineroot River =

- Location of Pineroot River in Manitoba

Location
- Country: Canada
- Province: Manitoba
- Region: Northern Region

Physical characteristics
- Source: Mikanagan Lake
  - coordinates: 54°47′41″N 101°38′34″W
  - elevation: 319 m (1,047 ft)
- Mouth: Lake Athapapuskow
  - coordinates: 54°42′25″N 101°40′09″W
  - elevation: 292 m (958 ft)
- Length: 10.7 km (6.6 mi)

Basin features
- River system: Nelson River drainage basin

The Pineroot River is a waterway in the Hudson Bay drainage basin in the Northern Region of Manitoba, Canada, approximately 3 km (1.9 mi) north of Bakers Narrows. The river begins at the south end of Mikanagan Lake, continues in a southerly direction over the Mikanagan Falls, to Whitefish Lake then drains in Lake Athapapuskow.

== Description ==
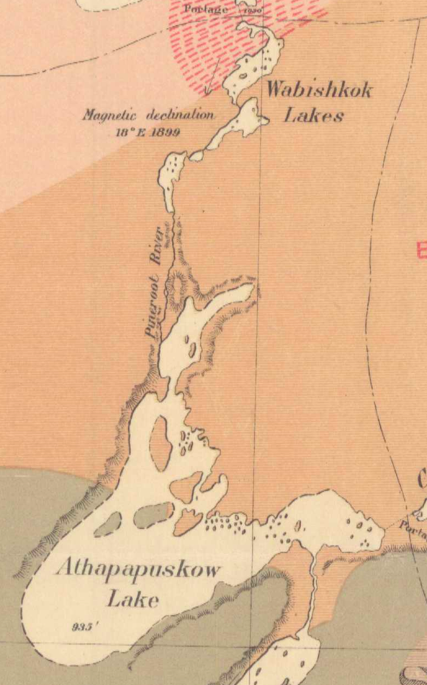
Detail of 1902 map first showing Pineroot River

The remote river flows through Churchill River Upland portion of the Midwestern Canadian Shield forests and is surrounded by mixed forest with stands of black spruce, white spruce, jack pine, and trembling aspen. The shoreline is characterized by steeply sloping irregular rock ridges and poorly drained areas of muskeg.

The Pineroot area is largely pristine and home to moose, black bear, lynx, wolf, and beaver. Bird species include raven, common loon, spruce grouse, bald eagle and hawk owl. The creek is not easily accessible, but there is some trapping, hunting, and recreational fishing activity.

The Pineroot River, and Whitefish Lake, are popular fishing areas containing burbot, lake whitefish, northern pike, sucker, walleye and yellow perch.

== History ==
The river was a traditional route for Cree hunters. The first recorded European to travel it was Joseph Hansom, a Hudson's Bay Company fur trader who paddled inland from Churchill to Kississing Lake and down the Pineroot to Lake Athapapuskow. Donaldson B. Dowling, working for the Geological Survey of Canada, was the first to survey the river in 1899. Subsequently, in 1902, it first appeared on a map drafted by Joseph B. Tyrrell and Dowling, which accurately recorded both its route and name. One of the earliest attempts at mining in the region was at the mouth of the Pineroot. In 1914 the Chica claim was staked there, and worked for several years without result.

== See also ==
- List of rivers of Manitoba
