= Oxford Lake =

Lake in Manitoba, Canada

- Location in Manitoba Oxford Lake (Canada)
- Location: Division No. 22, Manitoba
- Coordinates: 54°51′N 95°35′W
- Primary inflows: Hayes River
- Primary outflows: Hayes River
- Basin countries: Canada
- Surface area: 401 km^{2} (155 sq mi)
- Surface elevation: 186 m (610 ft).
- Islands: Carghill Island and numerous others
- Settlements: Oxford House

Oxford Lake is a lake on the Hayes River in Manitoba, Canada. The lake is 401 square kilometres (155 sq mi) in size and sits at a surface elevation of 186 m (610 ft).

== Description ==
Oxford Lake is a vaguely man-shaped lake, with a 'head' on the east, a 'neck', a northwest—southeast shoulder line and a 'torso' that tapers to a point in the west. The head is about 7 by 5 miles, the neck one mile across, and the shoulder line 11 miles. The south side of the torso is 25 miles and its northwest side 18 miles. On the northwest is a large island (Carghill Island) or peninsula that fills much of the torso. The Hayes Rivers enters from the southwest and exits from the 'head' southeast below the town and airport of Oxford House, Manitoba. The Carrot River enters on the northwest and allows a portage to Cross Lake, Manitoba on the Nelson River. Downstream is Knee Lake.

== See also ==
- List of lakes of Manitoba

== Notes ==
- Eric C. Morse,'Fur Trade Canoe Routes of Canada/Then and Now',1979
