= Assean Lake =

Lake in Manitoba, Canada

- Location of the lake in Manitoba Assean Lake (Canada)
- Location: Division No. 22, Northern Manitoba
- Coordinates: 56°13′21″N 96°30′01″W
- Basin countries: Canada

Assean Lake, is a lake located about 125 kilometres (78 mi) by road north-east of the town of Thompson, Manitoba, Canada.

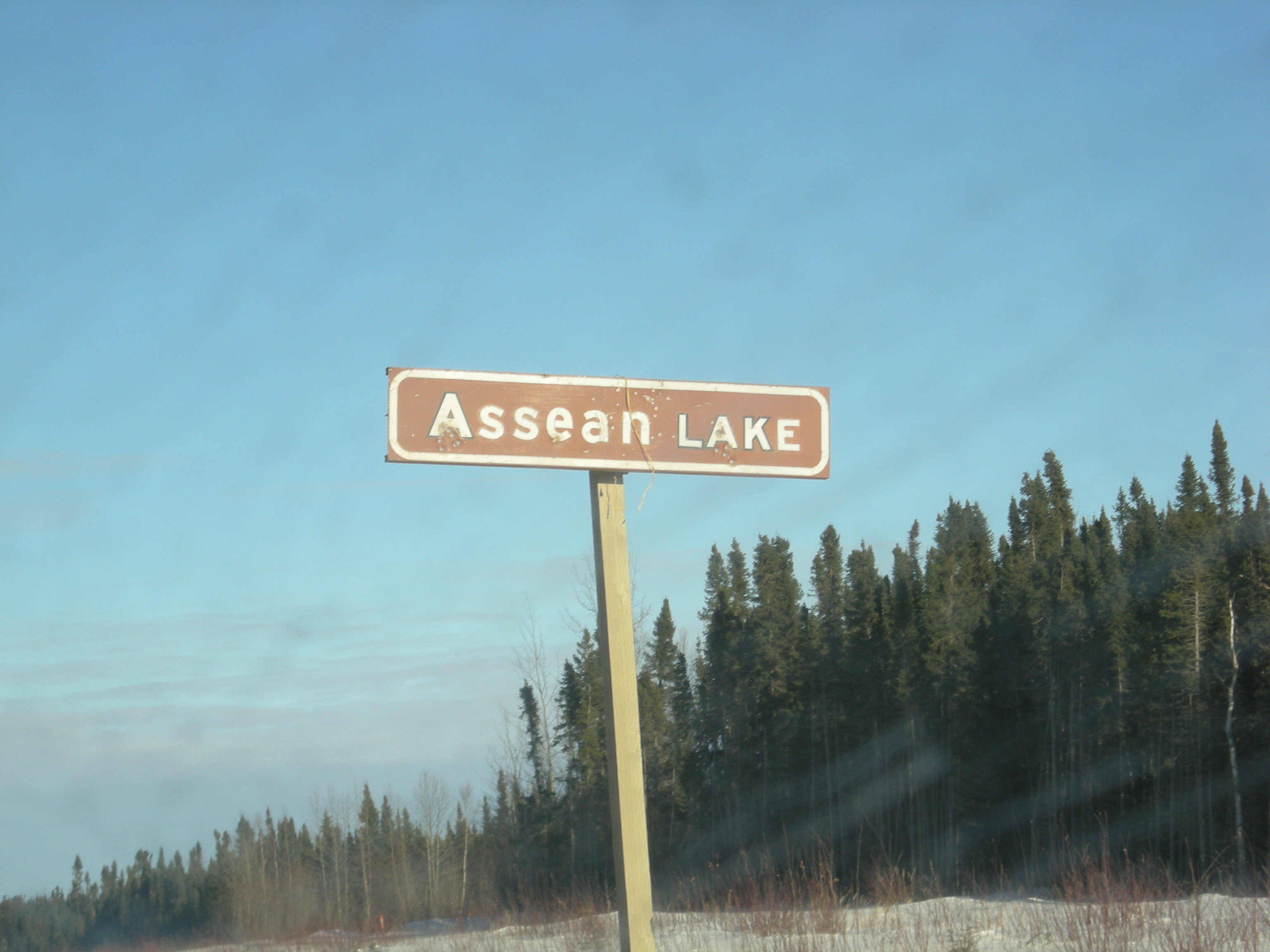
Assean Lake sign in Manitoba.

The lake is connected via a thin stretch of water to the Little Assean Lake. It lies just north-west of Split Lake.

== Overview ==
Assean Lake lies within the north-eastern extension of the Thompson Belt. The local geology of the Assean Lake consists of an extensive cover of lacustrine clay, silt, sand and basal till up to 20 metres (66 ft) in thickness.

The name of the lake is from the Cree word ᐊᓯᓃᐊᐧᐣ or asinîwan indicating a place with many stones. It has also been spelled as Asseyan or Assigan.

== See also ==
- List of lakes of Manitoba
