= Little Limestone Lake =

Lake in Manitoba, Canada

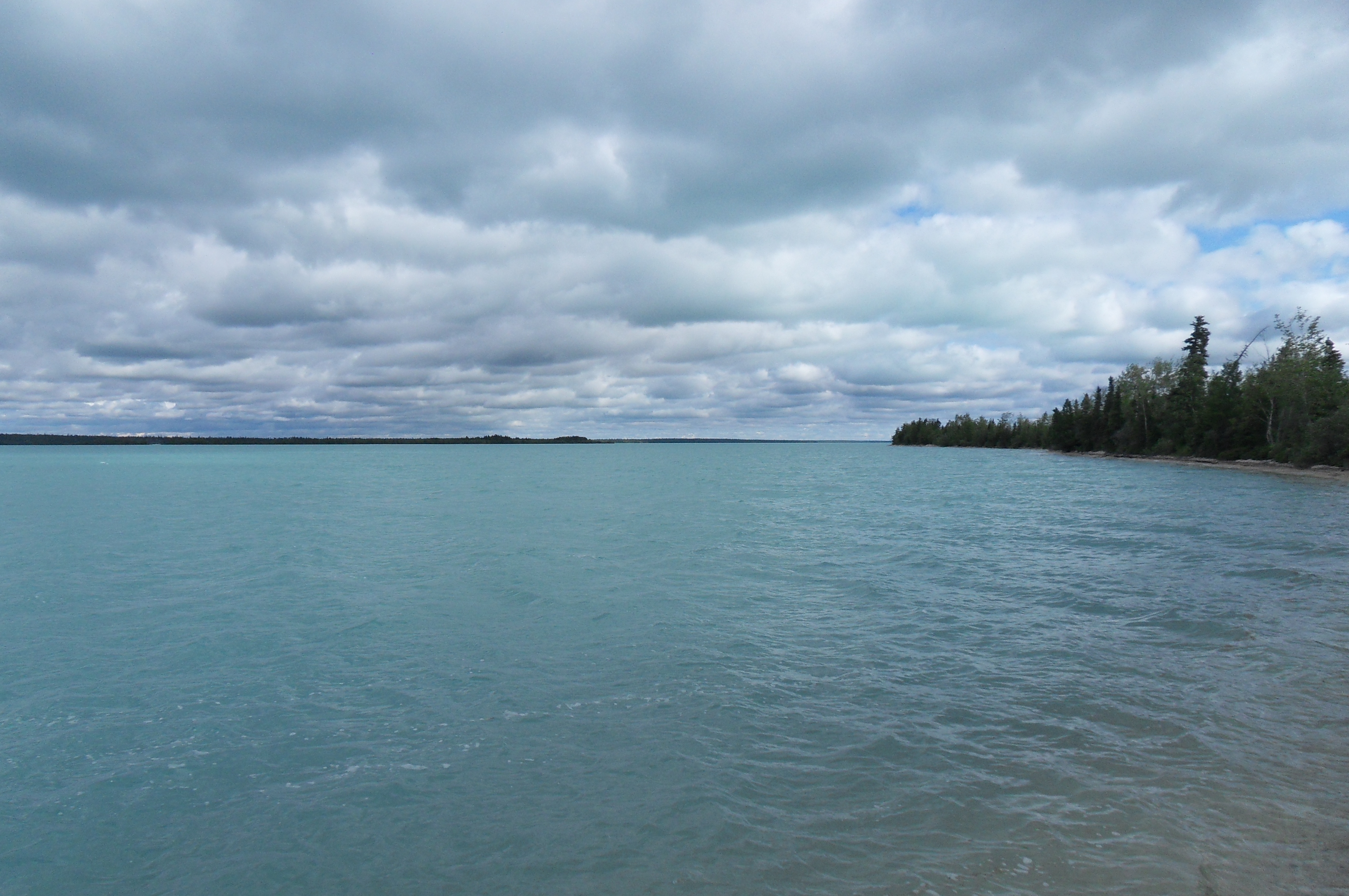
- Little Limestone Lake

- Location of the lake in Manitoba Little Limestone Lake (Canada)
- Location: Little Limestone Lake Provincial Park, Manitoba, Canada
- Coordinates: 53°47′N 99°19′W
- Type: lake

Little Limestone Lake is a lake located in Little Limestone Lake Provincial Park in northern Manitoba, Canada, about 500 kilometres (310 mi) north of Winnipeg, and 65 kilometres (40 mi) north of the town of Grand Rapids, Manitoba. It is located in the 4,095-hectare (10,120-acre) Little Limestone Lake Park Reserve, an example of karst geology, in the Manitoba Lowlands. The eastern shore is within the traditional territory of the Mosakahiken Cree Nation. Little Limestone Lake Park Reserve is an IUCN (World Conservation Union) protected area. It was designated mainly for conservation of a specific natural feature of outstanding or unique value.

The lake is considered to be the largest and most outstanding example of a marl lake in the world. It is a turquoise body of water that changes colour as calcite in the water dissolves or precipitates depending on temperature. When the water is warm, calcite comes out of the solution and forms microscopic crystals, which give the water its milky white colour. The source of the calcite is underground water, which flow into the lake in significant quantity.

== See also ==
- List of lakes of Manitoba
