= Sipiwesk Lake =

Lake in Manitoba, Canada

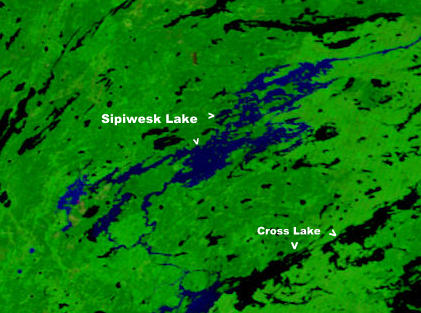
- Sipiwesk Lake north of Lake Winnipeg

- Location of the lake in Manitoba Sipiwesk Lake (Canada)
- Location: Division No. 22, Manitoba
- Coordinates: 55°5′18″N 97°34′31″W
- Primary inflows: Nelson River
- Primary outflows: Nelson River
- Basin countries: Canada
- Max. length: 78 km (48 mi)
- Surface area: 454 km^{2} (175 sq mi)
- Surface elevation: 183 m (600 ft)

Sipiwesk Lake is a large lake in the province of Manitoba in Canada north of Lake Winnipeg. The lake is a part of the Nelson River watershed and is located north of Cross Lake. The lake is about 78 km (48 miles) long.

The Nelson River flows north from Cross Lake and enters the south end of Sipiwesk Lake on each side of Bear Island flowing through Duck Lake located west of Bear Island. The Nelson River then flows out from the east end of Sipiwesk Lake.

At the north end where the Nelson River leaves the lake, a portage trail connects this lake to Landing Lake (via Sabomin Lake). From circa 1885 to 1889, the Hudson's Bay Company operated an outpost there, called Cross Portage.

== See also ==
- List of lakes of Manitoba
