= Kisseynew Lake =

Lake in Western Canada

- Location in Saskatchewan Kisseynew Lake (Canada)
- Location: Northern Saskatchewan; Northern Manitoba
- Coordinates: 54.9001°N 101.9171°W
- Part of: Churchill River drainage basin
- Primary outflows: Kississing River
- Basin countries: Canada
- Surface area: 6,599 ha (16,310 acres)
- Shore length^{1}: 381 km (237 mi)
- Surface elevation: 314 m (1,030 ft)
- Islands: Perry Island; Alloway Island; Frobisher Island
- Settlements: None
- ^{1} Shore length is not a well-defined measure.

Kisseynew Lake is a large lake in the Canadian provinces of Manitoba and Saskatchewan, within the Churchill River drainage basin. The Churchill River "drains most of north-central Saskatchewan into Manitoba" where it then flows east into the Hudson Bay. Kisseynew Lake's outflow is the Kississing River, which flows through Kississing Lake en route to the Churchill River. There are no communities on the lake.

== Description ==
Kisseynew Lake is a large, elongated lake with multiple islands, bays, and narrows that straddles the Saskatchewan–Manitoba border. Most of the lake is within Manitoba. It covers an area of 6,599 hectares (16,310 acres), has a 381-kilometre (237 mi) long shoreline, and is surrounded by boreal forest in the Canadian Shield. The climate is subarctic. The lake's outflow, the Kississing River, flows out from the northern shore.

There are no communities on the lake. Flin Flon, Manitoba, and Creighton, Saskatchewan, the nearest sizable communities, are about 27 kilometres (17 mi) to the south-west. Manitoba's Highway 800, which begins to the south at Provincial Trunk Highway 10, crosses Kisseynew Lake at Lobstick Narrows en route to Kississing Lake. Accessible via logging roads and a three-mile long boat ride, is a fishing lodge and outfitters.

== Fish species ==
Fish species commonly found in Kisseynew Lake include walleye, lake trout, and northern pike.

== See also ==
- List of lakes of Saskatchewan
- List of lakes of Manitoba
