= Munroe Lake =

Lake in Manitoba, Canada

- Location of the lake in Manitoba Munroe Lake (Canada)
- Location: Division No. 23, North Manitoba
- Coordinates: 59°11′49″N 98°33′16″W
- Basin countries: Canada
- Settlements: None

Munroe Lake is a lake in northern Manitoba near the provincial boundary with Nunavut, Canada.

== See also ==
- List of lakes of Manitoba
