= Goose River (Manitoba–Saskatchewan) =

River in Western Canada

Goose River Rat Creek, Small's River
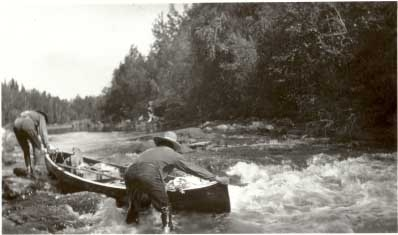
- Tracking Rapids on the Goose River

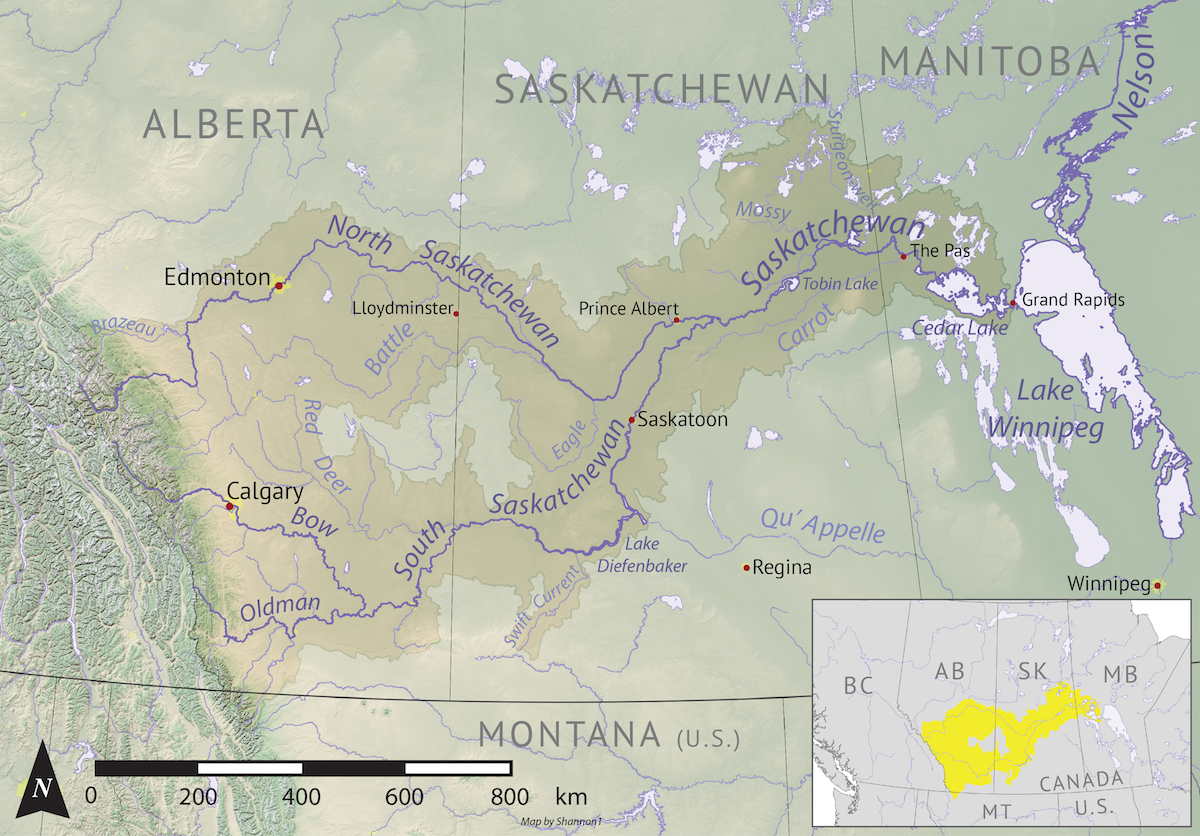
- Map of the Saskatchewan River drainage basin

- Location of the river mouth in Saskatchewan Goose River (Manitoba–Saskatchewan) (Canada)

Location
- Country: Canada
- Provinces: Manitoba; Saskatchewan

Physical characteristics
- Source: Lake Athapapuskow
  - location: Northern Region, Manitoba
  - coordinates: 54°33′26″N 101°27′39″W
  - elevation: 291 m (955 ft)
- Mouth: Sturgeon-Weir River
  - location: Division No. 18, Saskatchewan
  - coordinates: 54°19′00″N 101°49′01″W
  - elevation: 267 m (876 ft)
- Length: 40.5 km (25.2 mi)

Basin features
- River system: Nelson River

Goose River is a river in the Hudson Bay drainage basin in the Northern Region of Manitoba and Division No. 18 in Saskatchewan, Canada, approximately 19 kilometres (12 mi) south-east of Bakers Narrows.

== Description ==
The river's source is Lake Athapapuskow in Manitoba, near the community of Cranberry Portage. It runs south to Goose Lake, then passes into Saskatchewan for the final 700 metres (2,300 ft) to its confluence with the Sturgeon-Weir River. It provided an important route for First Nations hunters to travel between the Saskatchewan River and the Grass River systems. The river was explored by Samuel Hearne in 1774. The river (and Goose Lake) is first noted in a map drawn by Philip Turnor in 1779. It was travelled by David Thompson in 1794, and many other early European explorers and fur traders as a part of the "Middle Tract" from the interior of Canada to the Hudson Bay. In 1847, an Anglican missionary from nearby Cumberland House records converting Kinnakahpoo, "chief of the Rat River" on the banks of the river. It was first surveyed in 1896 by J.B. Tyrell. In 1919 the Canadian government created a channel through some of the rapids to make the route more easily navigable by canoe as an encouragement for prospectors to explore the region.

The remote stream flows through Churchill River Upland portion of the Midwestern Canadian Shield forests and is surrounded by mixed forest with stands of black spruce, white spruce, jack pine, and trembling aspen. The shoreline is characterized by steeply sloping irregular rock ridges and poorly drained areas of muskeg.

Goose River is difficult to access and largely pristine. brown trout, tullibee, northern pike, rainbow trout, walleye, and yellow perch are present. It is home to moose, black bear, lynx, wolf, and beaver. Bird species include raven, common loon, spruce grouse, bald eagle and hawk owl. There is some trapping and hunting activity in the area.

== Name ==
The 1806 Cha Chay Pay Way Ti's Map records the name "Nis Caw" which translates as Goose in Cree. In the explorer David Thompson's 1814 "Map of the North-West Territories of the Province of Canada", he names the waterway "Small's River", possibly after his new wife Charlotte Small. The local name is "Rat Creek", which goes back at least as far as the 1920s. The officially recognized name is "Goose River", adopted in 1948. Presumably, this name comes from "Goose Lake" which the river runs through.

== See also ==
- List of rivers of Manitoba
- List of rivers of Saskatchewan
