= Persian Lake =

Lake in Manitoba, Canada

- Location of the lake in Manitoba Persian Lake (Canada)
- Location: Manitoba, Canada
- Coordinates: 54°42′50″N 101°33′17″W
- Type: Lake

Persian Lake is a small lake in northern Manitoba, near the border between northeastern Saskatchewan and northwestern Manitoba. The lake is among an extremely large number of lakes in Canada. It is part of the Nelson River watershed, and is located around 8 kilometres to the northeast of the small town of Bakers Narrows.

== See also ==
- List of lakes of Manitoba
