= Kawakwunwit Lake =

Lake in Manitoba, Canada

- Location of the lake in Manitoba Kawakwunwit Lake (Canada)
- Location: Manitoba, Canada
- Coordinates: 53°33′57″N 99°31′19″W
- Type: Lake
- Part of: Nelson River basin
- Surface area: 2.68 km^{2} (1 sq mi)
- Surface elevation: 271 m (889 ft)

Kawakwunit Lake is a lake in Manitoba. It is part of the Nelson River basin.

== See also ==
- List of lakes of Manitoba
