= Sherritt-Gordon Mine =

Defunct mine in Manitoba, Canada

- Location within Manitoba
- Location: Sherridon, Manitoba, Canada; 55.135074°N 101.103339°W
- Products: zinc, copper, gold and silver
- Discovered: 1899
- Opened: 1931
- Closed: 1951
- Company: Sherritt International

Local impacts
- Pollution: acid, metals, sulphide
- Impacted: Kississing Lake

Sherritt-Gordon Mine is a defunct zinc and copper mine in Sherridon, Manitoba, Canada, on the shore of Kississing Lake.

Situated near Flin Flon, the mine is located about 800 kilometres (500 mi) northwest of the provincial capital city of Winnipeg.

Pollution from the mine contaminated Kississing Lake in what has been described as "one of the worst cases of acidic mine drainage in the world." In 1947, workers staged a months-long strike at the mine.

== History ==
Geological exploration of the area began in 1899, followed by prospectors from the Flin Flon area who were guided by local Métis. In 1923, deposits of copper-zinc sulphides were staked on the east shore of Kississing Lake, which were developed into the Sherritt-Gordon Mine.

The mine operated from 1931 to 1951 producing zinc and copper with low amounts of gold and silver.

On August 13, 1947, workers at the mine went on strike after pay negotiations with Sherritt International failed to make progress. The Co-operative Commonwealth Federation political party objected to the influx of the Royal Canadian Mounted Police during the strike By November, the strike was ongoing, with striking workers blocking non-striking workers on November 5. Courts passed an injunction in the second week of November against the strike.

The mine and produced 7.7 mega tons of ore which were dumped over an area covering 47 hectares including next to Camp Lake. Water from the contaminated Camp Lake has since leached into Kississing Lake. Weathering of the mine's tailings has released sulphate, metals and acid into surface and ground water for over 50 years since the mine has closed. In 2009, The Winnipeg Free Press described the pollution around the mine as "one of the worst cases of acidic mine drainage in the world".

The Government of Manitoba started remediation of the pollution from the mine in 2009. In 2017, unhappy with the progress of the remediation, members of the local community briefly blockaded the local highway, preventing access.

== See also ==
- List of mines in Manitoba
