= Joseph Smith (explorer) =

British fur trader

Joseph Smith was a British fur trader and explorer working for the Hudson's Bay Company. He was one of the first Europeans to explore the interior of what later became Canada from Hudson Bay. Smith died June 1765 en route to York Factory from the Saskatchewan River country. Smith's explorations played an important role in opening up the interior of western Canada to European trade, and his journals provide one of the earliest accounts of Cree life.

Joseph Smith arrived at Hudson Bay as a labourer in 1753. Three years later he was sent inland with Joseph Waggoner to accompany a Cree chief, Washiabitt, to his home grounds. Their instructions were to distribute gifts to the Indians they encountered in an effort to persuade them to travel downriver to York Factory. Following the Hayes and Fox rivers, they reached Cedar Lake on 31 October. Adopting the native way of life and travel, Smith continued south past the Porcupine Hills, crossing the Assiniboine River where he hunted buffalo.

In March 1757 Smith continued his travels by going north to the Swan River region. There his party built birch bark canoes, and traveled to Fort Bourbon. They then returned to York Factory by way of Oxford and Knee Lakes. The next year Smith returned to the Assiniboine River, and was the first European to record the use of a buffalo pound. In 1759 Smith joined the explorer Anthony Henday on a trip into Saskatchewan country, returning with a large flotilla of Cree bringing furs to trade. In 1763, the Cree leader Meesinkeeshick guided Smith inland via the Grass River. He became the first European to visit Lake Athapapuskow and the important Cranberry Portage. During his travels, Smith established a family with a Cree woman near Nipawin.

In 1764, accompanied by Isaac Batt, Smith traveled the same route up the Grass River. On the return journey Smith died. After his death his Cree wife brought their child and his furs downriver to York Factory. The Hudson Bay Company gave the furs, which he had traded illegally, to his "tent mate".
