= Knee Lake =

Lake in Manitoba, Canada

- Location of the lake in Manitoba Knee Lake (Canada)
- Location: Manitoba
- Coordinates: 55°03′14″N 94°44′18″W
- Part of: Hudson Bay drainage basin
- Primary inflows: Hayes River
- Primary outflows: Hayes River
- Basin countries: Canada
- Surface elevation: 176 m (577 ft)

Knee Lake is part of the Hayes River in Manitoba, Canada. It was on the voyageurs route from York Factory on Hudson Bay to Norway House, Manitoba on Lake Winnipeg. It gets its name from a knee-like bend in the middle. The upstream western part is about 6 miles from south to north and less than 4 miles broad. The lake narrows to less than half a mile and then extends about 20 miles northeast, this section being at most 4 miles across. Near the knee is Magnetic Island with an ore body that is said to make compasses useless. Upstream from the lake, the Hayes River exits eastward out of Oxford Lake, goes over Trout Falls and widens into a long lake which joins Knee Lake at its southwest corner. The river exits the northeast end of the lake and after about 7 miles and four portages broadens into Swampy Lake. At the east end of Swampy Lake is the dramstone where west-bound voyageurs took a dram to celebrate leaving the most difficult part of the river.

== See also ==
- List of lakes of Manitoba

== Bibliography ==
- Morse, Eric Wilton (1979). Fur trade canoe routes of Canada: then and now. Canadian University Paperbooks, 239. Toronto: University of Toronto Press. ISBN 9780802063847. OCLC 475052548.
