= Big Island Lake (Manitoba) =

Glacial lake in Manitoba, Canada

- Manistikwan
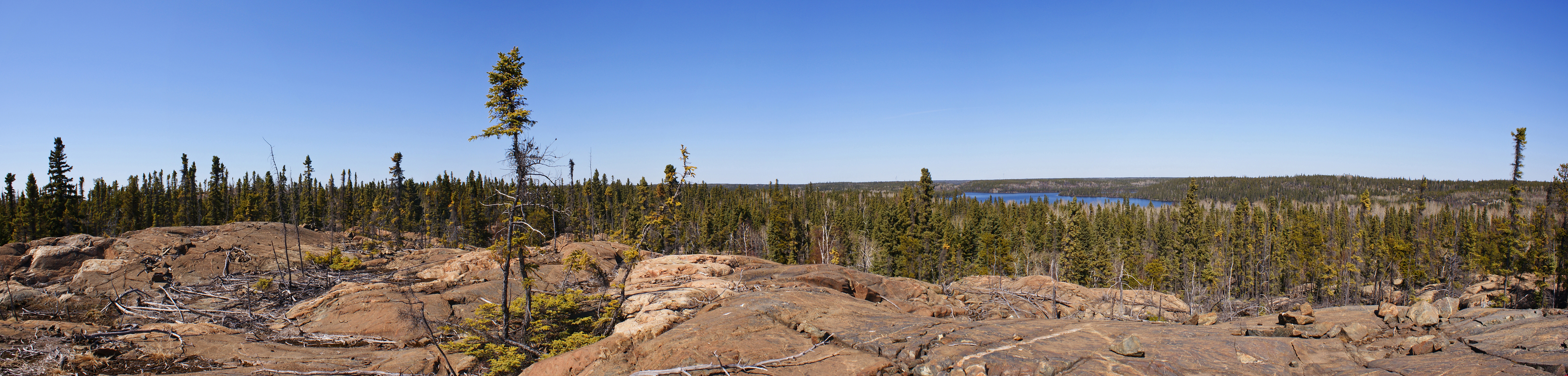
- Big Island Lake from the west

- Location in Manitoba Big Island Lake (Canada)
- Location: Manitoba
- Coordinates: 54°45′N 101°46′W
- Lake type: Glacial lake
- Primary inflows: Willow Creek
- Primary outflows: Big Island Creek
- Basin countries: Canada
- Max. length: 9.2 km (5.7 mi)
- Max. width: 5.2 km (3.2 mi)
- Surface area: 10 km^{2} (3.9 sq mi)
- Max. depth: 46 m (151 ft)
- Surface elevation: 293 m (961 ft)
- Islands: +24

Big Island Lake is a glacial lake located five kilometres (3.1 mi) east of Flin Flon, Manitoba, Canada.

== Description ==
The lake has a north–south orientation and is accessible via Highway 10. There is a seasonal cottage community on the south end, many cottages on the Big Island and scattered cottages elsewhere on the lake. The lake drains into Schist Lake via Big Island Creek, part of the Nelson River watershed. The lake is surrounded by Precambrian boreal forest, a mixed forest of coniferous and deciduous trees of the Canadian Shield. The area is a favourite location for hunters who can find large game such as moose, black bear, white tailed deer, woodland caribou, as well as many species of waterfowl. Fish species include northern pike, walleye, burbot, whitefish and lake trout.

== Etymology ==
Big Island's name comes from the large island which dominates the lake. The name was officially registered in 1999. Prior to that, the traditional Cree name of nearby Schist Lake (Manistikwan which means "Devil's Head") was applied to Big Island Lake.

== See also ==
- List of lakes of Manitoba
