= Antons Lake =

Lake in Manitoba, Canada

- Location of the lake in Manitoba Antons Lake (Canada)
- Location: Minnedosa, Manitoba
- Coordinates: 50°16′22″N 99°54′25″W
- Basin countries: Canada

Antons Lake, is a lake located to the north-west of Minnedosa in Manitoba. The lake is situated at the intersection between Manitoba Highway 16 and Manitoba Highway 10.

== Recreation ==
Due to the presence of rainbow trout in the lake, it is a popular fishing spot.

== See also ==
- List of lakes of Manitoba
