= Taltheilei Shale tradition =

The Taltheilei Shale tradition is the archeological name of the material culture of a late prehistoric western-area subarctic people dated to the period of 750 BC to AD 1000. The Taltheilei Shale Tradition is named after the "Taltheilei Narrows" (place of open water) of Great Slave Lake. Taltheilei people were Proto-Athapaskans.

== Ethnography ==
The Taltheilei were Boreal Forest people who moved into the lands previously inhabited by Arctic groups when the climate changed around 750 BC. Their territory included the central District of Mackenzie and the interior area of the District of Keewatin during the period of 700 BC until early trading posts were established. Sites attributable to the Taltheilei Shale Tradition have been found in several places. Their Little Duck Lake site later became the site of a Hudson Bay trading post called "Caribou Post" due to its proximity to the migration path of the caribou; these Taltheilei are ancestors of the Sayisi Dene, now a Chipewyan band. Other Taltheilei lived at Shethanei Lake (traveled later by Samuel Hearne in the early days of the Hudson's Bay Company), Caribou Lake (on the Manigatogan River system) and Egenolf Lake, all in northern Manitoba.

Taltheilei economy was based on barren-ground caribou. For hunting, Taltheilei made very distinctive spear and arrow points, some of which changed over time. Their tools included awls, adze bits, knives, scrapers, stone drills, whetstones.

The Taltheilei people are considered proto-Athapaskan, and are ancestors to two Dene people, the Yellowknives and the Chipewyan and possibly the Dene Dogribs. Taltheilei are distinct, linguistically and culturally, from the Cree, Ojibwe and other Algonkian people of the Boreal Forest.

== Early, Middle, Late periods ==
Archaeologist divide Taltheilei Shale Tradition into periods based on their tools.

- Their Early Period, 750 BC. - AD 200, is characterized by the presence of stemmed projectile points.
- The Middle Period, AD 200 - 700, is characterized by fewer stemmed projectile points and the appearance of lanceolate specimens.
- The Late Period, AD 700 - 1700, is characterized by the introduction of side-notched and corner-notched points.
