= Stony Lake (Hubbard County, Minnesota) =

Lake in the state of Minnesota, United States

- Location within Minnesota
- Location: Hubbard County, Minnesota
- Coordinates: 47°3′37″N 95°2′21″W
- Type: lake

Stony Lake is a lake in Hubbard County, in the U.S. state of Minnesota.

Stony Lake was named for its rocky shore.

== See also ==
- List of lakes in Minnesota
