= Manitoba memorial lakes =

Lake naming program in Manitoba, Canada

In 1945 the Geographical Names Board of Canada began a program to name previously unofficially named features after casualties from all three branches of the Canadian Armed Forces. With around 100,000 lakes, most without names, Manitoba has been an enthusiastic adopter of the program. In 1995 the project to commemorate the 4,000 Manitoba casualties from the Second World War by naming lakes, islands and bays after them was completed.

The province has had a full-time toponymist since 1971 to manage the naming of its geography. Locations are researched to ensure that names with long-standing local use take precedence and only then given a commemorative name randomly. Since 1995 the province has been commemorating casualties from World War I, the Korean War, Afghanistan and U.N. peacekeeping missions.

== Early names ==
In July 1947, the province of Manitoba, Canada, named 25 lakes after 26 men who lost their lives on active service in the Second World War.

These were:

Lake	Named after	Rank	From	Regiment / Unit / Branch	Medal	References
Mackie Lake	Alexander Morton Mackie	Flying officer	Winnipeg	Royal Canadian Air Force,No. 424 Squadron RCAF	Distinguished Flying Cross	
McMillan Lake	Lawrence McMillan	Flight lieutenant	Miami	Royal Canadian Air Force,No. 400 Squadron RCAF	Distinguished Flying Cross	
Vandekerckhove Lake	George Pierre Cornelius Vandekerckhove	Pilot officer	Stony Mountain	Royal Canadian Air Force,No. 427 Squadron RCAF	Distinguished Flying Cross	
Arbour Lake	Abram Arbour	Warrant officer	Winnipeg	Queen's Own Cameron Highlanders, Royal Canadian Infantry Corps	Military Cross	
Tenklei Lake	Edward S. Tenklei	Warrant officer	Carman	Regina Rifle Regiment, Royal Canadian Infantry Corps	Military Medal	
Suttie Lake	James Murray Suttie	Captain	Carberry	Royal Canadian Infantry Corps, Royal Welsh Fusiliers	Military Cross	
Craig Lake	James Craig	Flying officer	Winnipeg	Royal Canadian Air Force,No. 97 Squadron RAF	Distinguished Flying Cross	
Chepil Lake	Mikita (Mack) Chepil	Warrant officer	Edwin	Royal Canadian Air Force,No. 428 Squadron RCAF	Distinguished Flying Medal	
Dunphy Lake	Roderick James Dunphy	Flight lieutenant	Winnipeg	Royal Canadian Air Force,No. 426 Squadron RCAF	Distinguished Flying Cross	
Wilmot Lake	Brian Edmund Wilmot	Squadron leader	Winnipeg	Royal Canadian Air Force,No. 415 Squadron RCAF	Distinguished Flying Cross and bar	
Counsell Lake	Ronald Rainey Counsell	Major	Winnipeg	Queen's Own Cameron Highlanders, Royal Canadian Infantry Corps	Military Cross	
Story Lake	Rupert Rhoades Story	Lance corporal	Dauphin	Seaforth Highlanders of Canada	Military Medal	
Two Tod Lake (Note: named for twin brothers)	Richard Douglas Tod	Warrant officer	St. Vital	Royal Canadian Air Force, No. 75 Squadron RNZAF		
Two Tod Lake	Robert Ernest Tod	Warrant officer	St. Vital	Royal Canadian Air Force, No. 75 Squadron RNZAF	Distinguished Flying Medal	
Eager Lake	William Hedley Eager	Flying officer	Norwood	Royal Canadian Air Force	Distinguished Flying Cross	
McGavock Lake	John Joseph McGavock	Flying officer	Winnipeg	Royal Canadian Air Force	Distinguished Flying Cross	
Hunter Lake	Jack James Hunter	Private	Neepawa	Queen's Own Cameron Highlanders, Royal Canadian Infantry Corps	Military Medal	
Finch Lake	George Herbert Finch	Squadron leader	Birtle	Royal Canadian Air Force	Distinguished Flying Cross	
Matheson Lake	Donald John Matheson	Lieutenant		Royal Canadian Artillery, 5 Anti-tank Regiment	Military Cross	
Kadeniuk Lake	Walter Kadeniuk	Private	Winnipeg	Seaforth Highlanders of Canada	Military Medal	
Dobbyn Lake	Joseph Lloyd Dobbyn	Flying officer	Melita	Royal Canadian Air Force, No. 50 Squadron RAF	Distinguished Flying Cross	
Watt Lake	Robert Huycke Watt	Flying officer	Winnipeg	Royal Canadian Air Force	Distinguished Flying Cross	
Runner Lake	Joseph Moore Runner	Pilot officer	Treherne	Royal Canadian Air Force, No. 115 Squadron RCAF	Distinguished Flying Medal	
McCallum Lake	Douglas Harvey McCallum	Major	Carberry	Royal Canadian Engineers, 31sr Field Company	Distinguished Service Order	
Reid Lake	Edward James Reid	Captain	Winnipeg	Queen's Own Cameron Highlanders, Royal Canadian Infantry Corps	Military Cross	
Van Hende Lake	Marcel Octave Van Hende	Sergeant		Hastings and Prince Edward Regiment, Royal Canadian Infantry Corps	Distinguished Conduct Medal	

There are more than 4,200 lakes, islands, bays and other geographical features named after Manitoba's war dead.
