= Weir River (Manitoba) =

- Location of the mouth of the Weir River in Manitoba

Location
- Country: Canada
- Province: Manitoba
- Region: Northern
- Census division: 23

Physical characteristics
- Source: Weir Lake
  - coordinates: 56°58′55″N 94°33′46″W
  - elevation: 186 m (610 ft)
- Mouth: Nelson River
  - coordinates: 56°54′32″N 93°21′27″W
  - elevation: 20 m (66 ft)

Basin features
- River system: Hudson Bay drainage basin

The Weir River is a river in the Hudson Bay drainage basin in census division 23 in Northern Manitoba, Canada. Its flows from Weir Lake to the Nelson River as a left tributary, 70 kilometres (43 mi) upstream of that river's mouth at Hudson Bay.

There is a flag stop on the Hudson Bay Railway where it crosses the river. Canoeists and hikers can wait by a signpost to flag down the Via Rail Winnipeg–Churchill train.

== See also ==
- List of rivers of Manitoba
