= Weir Lake (Manitoba) =

Lake in Manitoba, Canada

- Location of the lake in Manitoba Weir Lake (Canada)
- Location: Census Division 23, Northern Region, Manitoba
- Coordinates: 57°00′01″N 94°34′58″W
- Part of: Hudson Bay drainage basin
- Primary outflows: Weir River
- Basin countries: Canada
- Max. length: 4.3 km (2.7 mi)
- Max. width: 3.8 km (2.4 mi)
- Surface elevation: 186 m (610 ft)

Weir Lake is a lake in census division 23 in Northern Manitoba, Canada. It is in the Hudson Bay drainage basin and is the source of the Weir River.

== See also ==
- List of lakes of Manitoba
