= Oxford House, Manitoba =

Oxford House Bunibonibee ᐸᓂᑇᓂᐱᐩ panipwânipiy
- Indian reserve
- Oxford House 24
- Location of Oxford House in Manitoba
- Coordinates: 54°56′54″N 95°15′56″W
- Country: Canada
- Province: Manitoba
- Region: Northern
- Established: 1798

Government
  - MP (Churchill—Keewatinook Aski): Niki Ashton (NDP)
  - MLA (Keewatinook): Ian Bushie (NDP)

Area
  - Total: 51.01 km^{2} (19.70 sq mi)
- Elevation: 664 m (2,178 ft)

Population (2016)
  - Total: 1,950
  - Density: 38.2/km^{2} (99/sq mi)
- Time zone: UTC-6 (CST)
  - Summer (DST): UTC-5 (CDT)

Oxford House (Cree: ᐸᓂᑇᓂᐱᐩ, Bunibonibee/panipwânipiy) is a First Nations Cree community in northern Manitoba, located on the Oxford House 24 Indian reserve. The community is located along the eastern shore of Oxford Lake at the mouth of Hayes River, 950 kilometres (590 mi) north of Winnipeg. The Hayes River was designated a Canadian Heritage River in 2006.

The Bunibonibee Cree Nation have reserved for themselves 13 separate tracts, of which Oxford House 24 serves as their main reserve, containing the settlement of Oxford House.

== History ==
Oxford House was established in 1798 as a Hudson's Bay Company fur trading post on the fur trade route between York Factory on the Hudson Bay and Norway House some 30 km (19 mi) north of Lake Winnipeg.

Oxford House is said to be site of one of the earliest strikes in Canada when fur trade employees went on strike in 1820 to insist on better pay.

People from nearby areas moved to the trading site and formed the community of Oxford House. The United Church played a major role in the development of the community. The ministers and their wives were the first nurses and teachers.

== People of Oxford House ==
=== When the Dust Settles ===
"I really wanted to show what it's like to live in a place like that, just so people can understand more the struggles that First Nations people go through

— Carlene Weenusk,

In 2016, N'we Jinan travelled to Oxford House and made two music videos with indigenous youth living there, "When the Dust Settles" and "BoiDee". The two videos received attention from outside the community for the insight they offer into the problems facing youth living on remote reserves. The songs are included on the N'We Jinan album, Silent War recorded in Vancouver in 2017.

== Demographics ==
Oxford House 24 Indian reservation had a population of 1,864 in 2011 living in 335 dwellings on a land area of 51.01 square km. The median age was 21.4. Cree was selected as the mother tongue of 1,500 residents.

== Infrastructure ==
Oxford House has a high school, elementary school, a pre-school (Head Start) an arena, a Northern Store with a Tim Hortons, a nursing station, a Royal Canadian Mounted Police detachment, the University College of the North Centre, an airport, a motel (Triple B), water treatment plant, band office, care home, medivac operation/emergency, youth building, a radio station, and a conservation office.

=== Fire Hall ===
The Oxford House Fire Hall was built in 2015.

=== Care Home ===
George Colon Memorial Home was built in 1988.

=== Outdoor Rink ===
The Outdoor Rinks were built in 2015. They are located on each end of the community. The outdoor rink is for everyone.

=== Churches ===
There are 5 Churches in Oxford House. They are United Church, R.C Church, Niyahk Bible Chapel, Full Gospel, Pentecostal Church.

=== University College of the North Centre ===
The Oxford House UCN Centre opened its doors at 2015.

=== Elementary school ===
Elementary School was built in 1974 and completed in 1975.
