= Wallace Lake (Manitoba) =

Lake in the Canadian territory of Manitoba

- Interactive map of Wallace Lake
- Location: Manitoba
- Coordinates: 51°00′45″N 95°20′30″W
- Surface area: 1,053 hectares (2,600 acres)

Wallace Lake is a lake in the Canadian province of Manitoba.

== Location ==
Wallace Lake is located on the eastern border of Manitoba, around 14 miles from Bissett. The lake itself is located in a grassy area, south of the South Atitaki Park Reserve.
