= Stone Lake (New Mexico) =

Reservoir in New Mexico, United States

- Location within New Mexico Location within the United States
- Location: Rio Arriba, New Mexico
- Coordinates: 36.717°N 106.877°W
- Basin countries: United States
- Surface area: 450 acres (0.70 mi^{2})
- Surface elevation: 7,251 ft (2,210 m)

Stone Lake is a reservoir in Rio Arriba, New Mexico. Also known as Boulder Lake, it sits 5.5 mi (9 km) north of Stinking Lake and 18 mi (29 km) west northwest of Tierra Amarilla. The lake is located inside the Jicarilla Apache Reservation.

The lake contains a boating ramp and has populations of rainbow trout.
