= Redstone Lake =

Redstone Lake may refer to one of two lakes in Ontario, Canada:

- Redstone Lake (Haliburton County), in Haliburton County
- Redstone Lake (Sudbury District), in Sudbury District
