= Stony Lake (Manitoba) =

Lake in Manitoba, Canada

- Location of the lake in Manitoba Stony Lake (Canada)
- Location: Division No. 23, North Manitoba
- Coordinates: 58.85334°N 98.63586°W
- Primary inflows: North Seal River (Ireland Lake)
- Primary outflows: North Seal River
- Basin countries: Canada
- Max. length: 26 km (16 mi)
- Max. width: 3.5 km (2.2 mi)
- Surface elevation: 250 m (820 ft)
- Settlements: None

Stony Lake is a lake in the northern Manitoba, Canada.

It is formed at an elevation of 250 m (820 ft), along the North Seal River, which flows east into the Seal River, which in turn empties into the Hudson Bay.

The community of Tadoule Lake, located 9 kilometers (5.6 mi) east of the southern arm of the lake, is the closest inhabited settlement.

Many islands raise from the lake, among them Moffatt Island, Seamen Island (largest), and Radcliffe Island.

== See also ==
- List of lakes of Manitoba
