= Egenolf Lake =

Lake in Manitoba, Canada

- Location of the lake in Manitoba Egenolf Lake (Canada)
- Location: North Manitoba
- Coordinates: 59°03′N 100°00′W
- Primary inflows: North Seal
- Primary outflows: North Seal
- Basin countries: Canada
- Max. length: 20 mi (32 km)

Egenolf Lake is a lake in northern Manitoba, about 75 kilometres south of the provincial boundary with Nunavut, Canada. Pike have been caught at Egenolf Lake measuring well over 50 inches.

Egenolf Lake is the home base of Gangler's North Seal River Lodge and Outposts, a popular sportfishing and hunting operation. Gangler's has introduced an airstrip to the lake to accommodate clients private planes and their commercial chartered airlines.

Ganglers North Seal River Lodge has made adjacent lakes accessible (East Lake, Minuhik Lake and Blackfish Lake.

== See also ==
- List of lakes of Manitoba
