= Mackie Lake (Manitoba) =

Lake in Manitoba, Canada

- Location of the lake in Manitoba Mackie Lake (Canada)
- Location: Division No. 23, Northwestern Manitoba
- Coordinates: 56.9628°N 101.9024°W
- Basin countries: Canada

Mackie Lake is a small lake with abundant trout. It is located west of Lynn Lake in northwestern Manitoba, Canada near the border with Saskatchewan.

The lake is one of 25 Manitoba memorial lakes named, in July 1947, after 26 men who lost their lives on active service in the Second World War. Mackie Lake is named after Flying Officer Alexander Morton Mackie (service no. J/88245) who, along with his crew (flying Halifax III MZ-805, coded QB-X, 424 Sqdn RCAF from Skipton-on-Swale), failed to return from an operation to mine Flensburg Harbour on 12 January 1945.

MZ-805 was probably the Halifax shot down by German night fighter ace Oberfeldwebel Hans Schadowski at 21:05 hours near Langeland.

== See also ==
- List of lakes of Manitoba
