= Thompson Lake (Manitoba) =

Lake in Manitoba, Canada

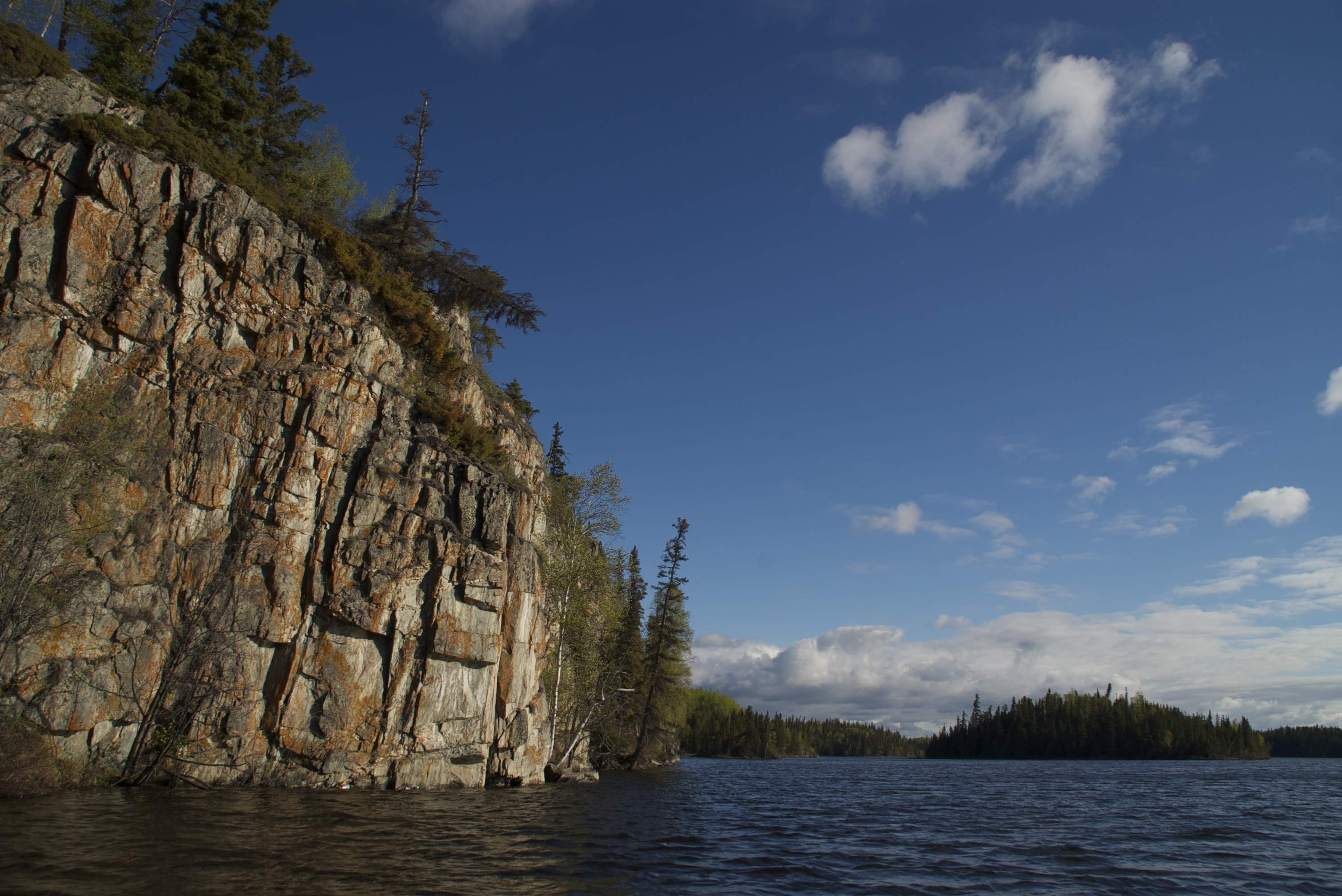
- Thompson Lake

- Location of the lake in Manitoba Thompson Lake (Canada)
- Location: Manitoba
- Coordinates: 54°45′58″N 101°34′32″W
- Lake type: Glacial Lake
- Primary inflows: Alberts Lake, Bryan Lake
- Primary outflows: Murray Lake
- Basin countries: Canada
- Max. length: 3 km (1.9 mi)
- Max. width: 1.6 km (0.99 mi)
- Shore length^{1}: 13 km (8.1 mi)
- Surface elevation: 299 m (981 ft)
- Islands: 13
- ^{1} Shore length is not a well-defined measure.

Thompson Lake is a glacial lake approximately 12 kilometres (7.5 mi) northeast of Bakers Narrows which drains into Murray Lake. It is part of the Nelson River watershed, in the Hudson Bay drainage basin in the Northern Region of Manitoba, Canada. The lakes sits in Churchill River Upland portion of the Midwestern Canadian Shield forests and is surrounded by mixed forest with stands of black spruce, white spruce, jack pine, and trembling aspen. The shoreline is characterized by steeply sloping irregular rock ridges and poorly drained areas of muskeg. The lake contains northern pike, walleye, and yellow perch.

The name was officially adopted in 1940.

== See also ==
- List of lakes of Manitoba
