= Lake Athapapuskow =

Glacial lake in Western Canada

- Lake Athapap
- Athapa'puskow Saka'higan (Cree)
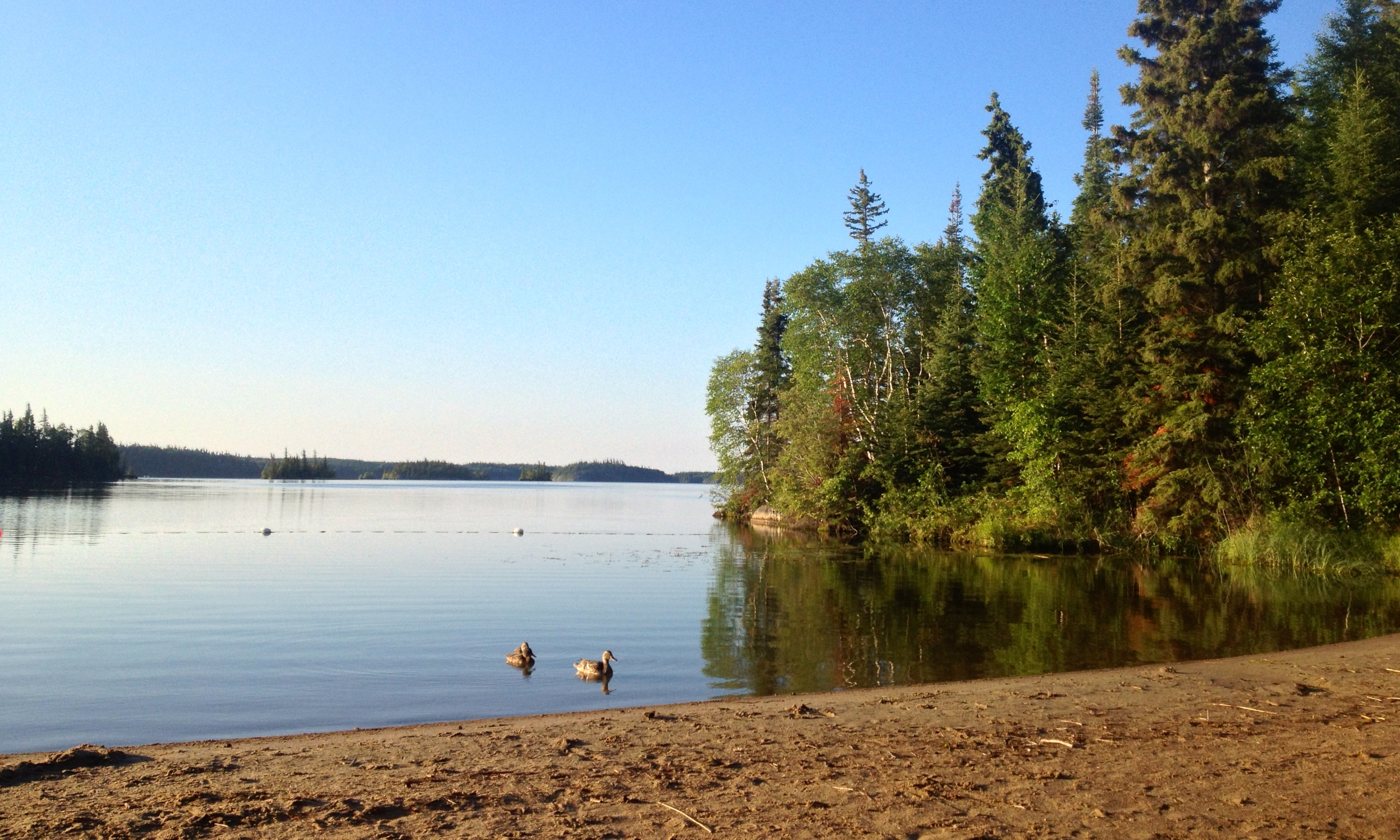
- Lake Athapapuskow from the shore of the Bakers Narrows Campground looking southeast

- Location of Lake Athapapuskow in Manitoba Lake Athapapuskow (Canada)
- Location: Northern Manitoba; Northern Saskatchewan
- Coordinates: 54°33′N 101°40′W
- Lake type: glacial lake
- Part of: Nelson River drainage basin
- Primary inflows: Pineroot River; Mistik Creek; Schist Creek; Flintoba Creek
- Primary outflows: Goose River
- Basin countries: Canada
- Max. length: 31.2 km (19.4 mi)
- Max. width: 35.2 km (21.9 mi)
- Surface area: 269 km^{2} (104 sq mi)
- Max. depth: 71 m (233 ft)
- Shore length^{1}: 786 km (488 mi)
- Surface elevation: 291 m (955 ft)
- Frozen: November–May
- Islands: + 575
- Settlements: Cranberry Portage; Bakers Narrows; Millwater
- ^{1} Shore length is not a well-defined measure.

Lake Athapapuskow is a glacial lake in Manitoba and Saskatchewan, Canada, located 15 kilometres (9.3 mi) southeast of Flin Flon, Manitoba. The lake is in the Hudson Bay drainage basin and is the source of the Goose River.

== Description ==
Lake Athapapuskow consists of three connected bodies of water: "Big Athapap" to the south, "Little Athapap" in the middle, and the "North Arm". Only about 2 km^{2} (0.77 sq mi) of the lake, at the very west end of Big Athapap, is in Saskatchewan; the remaining 267 km^{2} (103 sq mi) of the lake is in Manitoba. There are three communities on the lake, Cranberry Portage on the southeast end, Millwater on the north shore of "Big Athapap", and Bakers Narrows between the "Little Athapap" and the "North Arm". The Flin Flon Airport is located on the north shore of "Little Athapap". Bakers Narrows Provincial Park straddles the narrows between the North Arm and Little Athapap. There are several fishing lodges located on the lake.

The lake is surrounded by Precambrian boreal forest, a mixed forest of coniferous and deciduous trees of the Canadian Shield. The area contains stands of black spruce, jack pine, white spruce, and trembling aspen. It drains via the Goose River (also known locally as the Rat River), and is part of the Nelson River basin.

Fish species include walleye, yellow perch, northern pike, lake trout, lake whitefish, burbot, rainbow trout, white sucker, Tullibee, splake, and small mouth bass. The lake is well known for its sport fishing and has held three world records to date. In 1937, Leone Grayson caught a world record Lake Trout off Gull Island, a feat recorded in a memorial cairn at the Bakers Narrows Campground.

== History ==
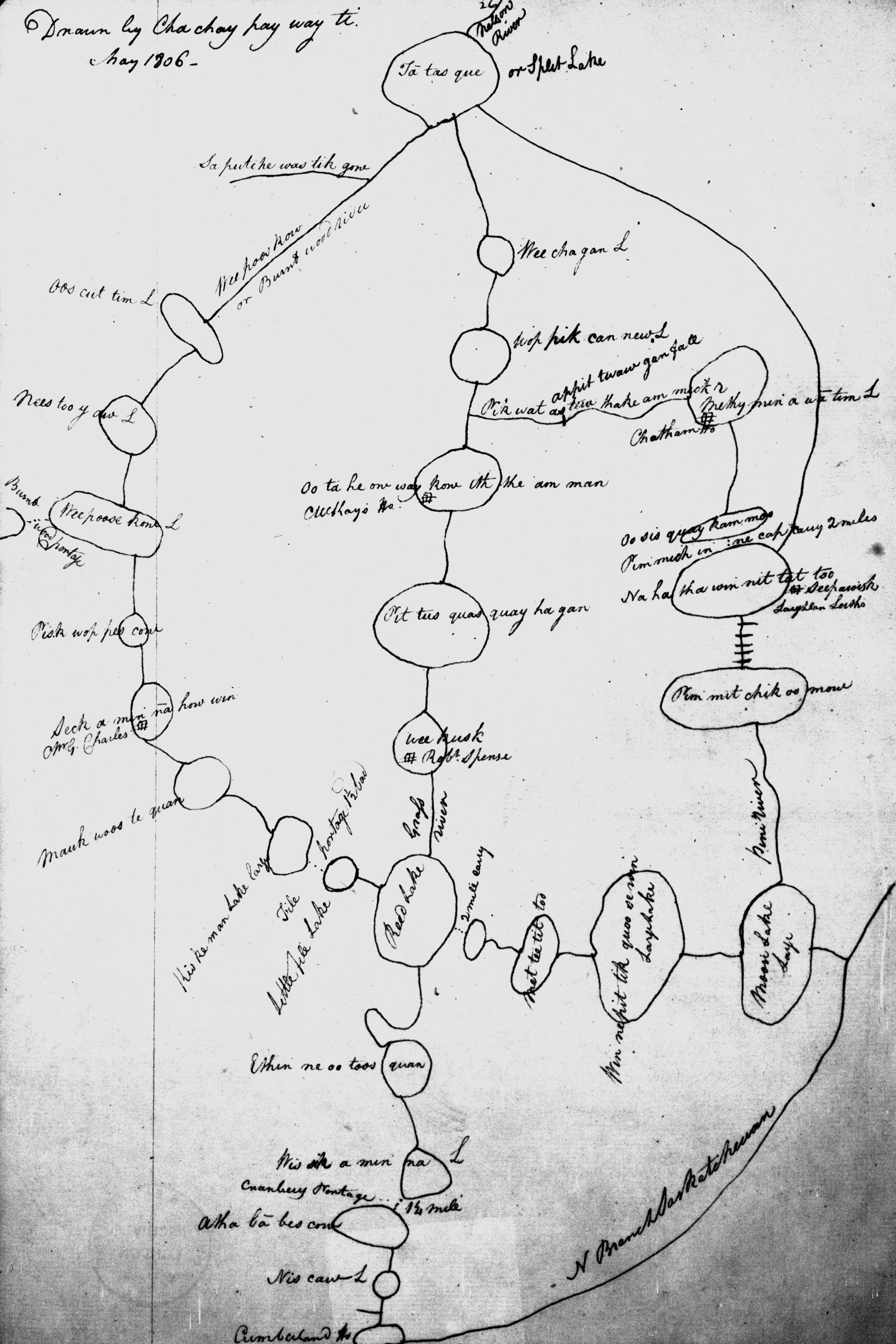
Cha Chay Pay Way Ti's Map showing Lake Athapap (1806)

The area has been inhabited since prehistoric times. Archaeological digs at Bakers Narrows revealed pottery, arrowheads, and other artifacts which were at least 2,500 years old and indicated regular habitation by people of the Shield Archaic tradition, who hunted caribou in the area as far back as 7,000 years ago. They were eventually supplanted by the Woodland Cree who were nomadic hunters in this region. The site of Cranberry Portage has been the primary route linking the Grass River and Saskatchewan River watersheds for at least 2,000 years.

Many of the most important explorers in Canadian history travelled through Lake Athapapuskow. In 1763, Hudson's Bay Company explorers Joseph Smith and Isaac Batt, guided by Cree leader Meesinkeeshick, became the first European recorded to visit Lake Athapapuskow; Smith died on the return journey to York Factory. Ten years later, the Governor of Churchill sent the fur trader Joseph Hansom, also guided by Cree, inland to extend the reach of the HBC. He paddled from Lake Kississing down the Pineroot River, reaching Lake Athapapuskow. In 1774 the explorer Samuel Hearne with 2 Englishmen, 6 native guides, and 5 canoes, laden with "180 lbs. Brazil Tobacco, 130 lbs. Powder, 100 wt. of Shott & Ball, 6 Gallns Brandy and some other trifling articles of Trading goods" paddled up the Grass River to Cranberry Portage and into Lake Athapapuskow en route to establishing Cumberland House. This route became an important part of the North American fur trade, known as the "Upper Tract". It was abandoned by 1800 in favour of the Nelson River and Hayes River routes. In 1794, the fur-trader and cartographer David Thompson, surveyed the lake.

The lake first appeared on a map drawn by Peter Pond in 1785 and was described as the "Middle Road to Hudson's Bay". The name of the lake was first noted In 1806, when explorer and surveyor Peter Fidler recorded the main waterways of his Cree partners in the notable "Cha Chay Pay Way Ti’s Map of the Waterways of a Part of Northern Manitoba", Cranberry Portage and Lake Athapapuskow are clearly marked on it. In 1896 J.B. Tyrell surveyed a portion of the south shore, but due to its remoteness, the lake was not fully mapped until 1914 when the Geological Survey of Canada sent Everend Bruce to do so in 1914.

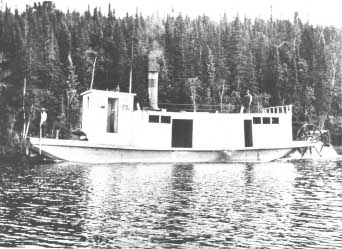
The S.S. Tonopah on Lake Athapapuskow c. 1918

After the discovery of ore at Flin Flon, the lake became an important transportation link. During the First World War, ore from the Mandy Mine on Schist Lake, was barged across Lake Athapapuskow on the stern-wheeler S.S. Tonapah on its way to The Pas where it was then shipped by rail for smelting. In 1917 a road first reached the south shore from Sturgeon Landing and in 1928 the Hudson Bay Railway reached Cranberry Portage. The town of Cranberry Portage itself was established on the southeast arm of the lake in 1922 when William Thompson built a house there. Manitoba Highway 10 reached Cranberry Portage in 1949 and was extended to Bakers Narrows in 1951. In 1961 Bakers Narrows Provincial Park was established on the lake. There are several fishing lodges located on the lake.

The name was officially registered in 1948 and is believed to be derived from "Athapa'puskow Saka'higan" meaning "rock on both sides lake" in Swampy Cree, which aptly describes the stony pre-Cambrian shores.

== Islands ==
The lake has over 575 islands, most of them unnamed. Some of the named islands include:

- Bakers Island
- Four Mile Island
- Gull Island
- Half Moon Island
- Hudson Bay Island
- Isabelle's Island
- Log Cabin Island
- See-Through Island
- Seven Mile Island
- Sewell's Island
- Steckler's Island
- Washing Machine Island
- Windmill Island

== See also ==
- List of lakes of Manitoba
- List of lakes of Saskatchewan
