= Sherridon =

- Community boundaries

- Location of Sherridon
- Coordinates: 55°7′26″N 101°5′12″W
- Country: Canada
- Province: Manitoba
- Region: Northern
- Census Division: No. 21

Government
  - Mayor: Nick Benyk
  - Governing Body: Sherridon Community Council
  - MP: Niki Ashton
  - MLA: Tom Lindsey

Population (2011 Census)
  - Total: 80
  - Density: 4.1/km^{2} (11/sq mi)
- Time zone: UTC−06:00 (CST)
  - Summer (DST): UTC−05:00 (CDT)
- Postal Code: R0B 1L0
- Area codes: 204, 431
- NTS Map: 063N03
- GNBC Code: GAZAC

Sherridon, Manitoba, is an unincorporated community in northern Manitoba, Canada.

== History ==
Sherridon originated as the service centre for the nearby Sherritt Gordon Mine. The mine closed in 1952, resulting in the equipment and many of the workers and families relocating to Lynn Lake. In 1949 the first house from Sherridon was sleighed to Lynn Lake as a test run over the 160 mi (260 km) of cat train trails. Over the next three years, 208 buildings were moved to Lynn Lake from Sherridon. Houses, stores, banks and churches were loaded on sleds and pulled by caterpillar tractors over the ice and snow to Lynn Lake.

The historic four-storey Hotel Cambrian, one of the only early 20th century buildings in the community not moved to Lynn Lake, was destroyed by fire on June 2, 2012. At the time of the fire the hotel was unoccupied, in a state of disrepair, and had been disconnected from electricity. The Royal Canadian Mounted Police consider the fire suspicious.

A recent gold mine, operated by Pioneer Metals at Puffy Lake, closed in 1989.

== Geography ==
The community is on the OmniTRAX rail line to Lynn Lake about 156 km (97 mi) north of The Pas. Pukatawagan Reserve is 72 km (45 mi) further north of Sherridon. A 78 km (48 mi) community-access gravelled road was constructed as part of the Puffy Lake Mine development, and the community is now connected to Provincial Trunk Highway 10 (PTH 10) between Cranberry Portage and Flin Flon.

== Demographics ==
In the 2021 Census of Population conducted by Statistics Canada, Sherridon had a population of 56 living in 20 of its 31 total private dwellings, a change of −43.4% from its 2016 population of 99. With a land area of 11.88 km^{2} (4.59 sq mi), it had a population density of 4.7/km^{2} (12.2/sq mi) in 2021.
