= Wapusk National Park =

National park in Manitoba, Canada

- Parc national Wapusk
- IUCN category II (national park)
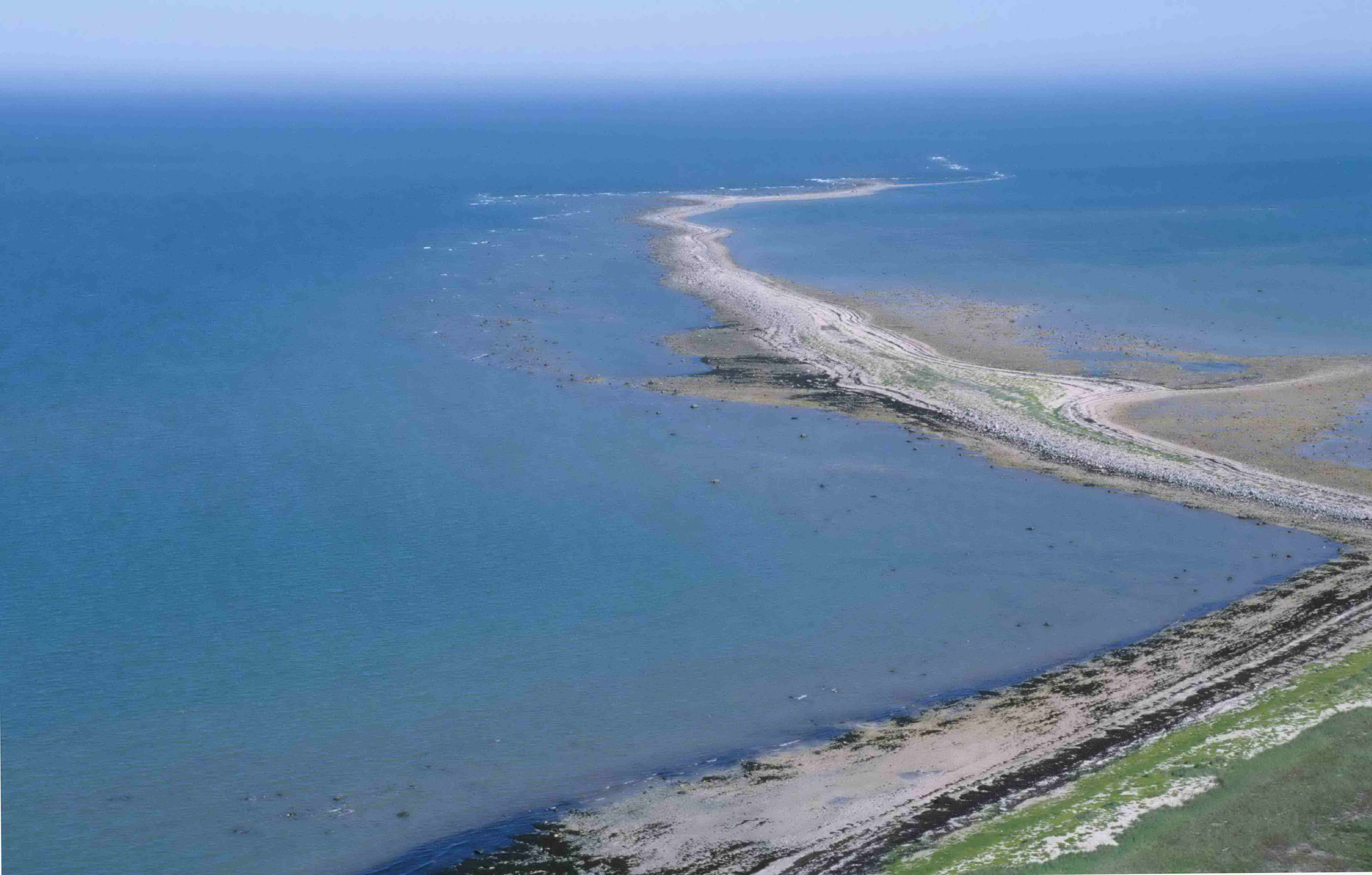
- Cape Churchill in summertime

- Location within Canada Location within Manitoba
- Interactive map of Wapusk National Park
- Location: Manitoba, Canada
- Nearest city: Churchill
- Coordinates: 57°46′26″N 93°22′17″W
- Area: 11,475 km^{2} (4,431 sq mi)
- Established: 1996
- Visitors: 82 (in 2022–23)
- Governing body: Parks Canada
- Website: Wapusk National Park

Wapusk National Park (/wəˈpʌsk/) is Canada's 37th national park, established in 1996. The name comes from the Cree word for polar bear (wâpask).

Located on the shores of Hudson Bay in the Hudson Plains ecozone 45 kilometres (28 mi) south of Churchill, its accessibility is limited due to its remote location and an effort to preserve the park. The park is home to Cape Churchill, which is renowned as the best location in the world to view and photograph wild polar bears. Cape Churchill is only accessible by helicopter or Tundra Buggy.

The park was the subject of a short film in 2011's National Parks Project, directed by Hubert Davis and scored by Kathleen Edwards, Matt Mays and Sam Roberts.

== Overview ==
Established in 1996, Wapusk National Park is 11,475 square kilometres (4,430 sq mi) of protected diverse and remote wilderness, located in Northeast Manitoba along the coast of Hudson Bay. Wapusk derives from the Cree word for "white bear", and as the meaning indicates, is a significant maternity denning area for the polar bear, Ursus maritimus. The park is also characterized by being part of a large transitional zone between the three biomes of arctic tundra, marine, and boreal forest. It includes a large part of the Hudson Bay Lowlands, a subarctic region bordering Hudson Bay that is mostly muskeg and wet peatlands. Wapusk National Park lies on the traditional territories of many Indigenous communities such as the Cree of York Factory, Fox Lake, Sayisi-Dene, and Inuit. Native species like caribou and polar bears are being heavily affected by climate change through warmer temperatures, ice and permafrost melting, and changing vegetation in the park. Tourism in this park is not very high but there is concern for the negative impacts increased tourism may cause. The geology of the area has many underlying limestone formations, and a past in fur trade. Glacial processes shape many of the habitats seen today. It is one of Canada's wildest and most remote landscapes.

In summer, the polar bears of Wapusk National Park come ashore as the ice on the Hudson Bay melts entirely, waiting on the tundra until the water freezes again in November. Pregnant females remain ashore, sheltered in maternity dens within the peatlands in Wapusk, giving birth in peat dens, emerging each year in March.

Numerous birds are found in Wapusk National Park and it is a likely breeding area of the short-billed dowitcher.

In 2010, biologists affiliated with the American Museum of Natural History and City College of the City University of New York published a report in Canadian Field-Naturalist offering the first documented evidence that the temperamental grizzly bears are migrating into polar bear territory. Researchers found that seven grizzlies have been spotted in Wapusk National Park south of Churchill, between 2003 and 2008.

== Size of the protected area and boundaries ==
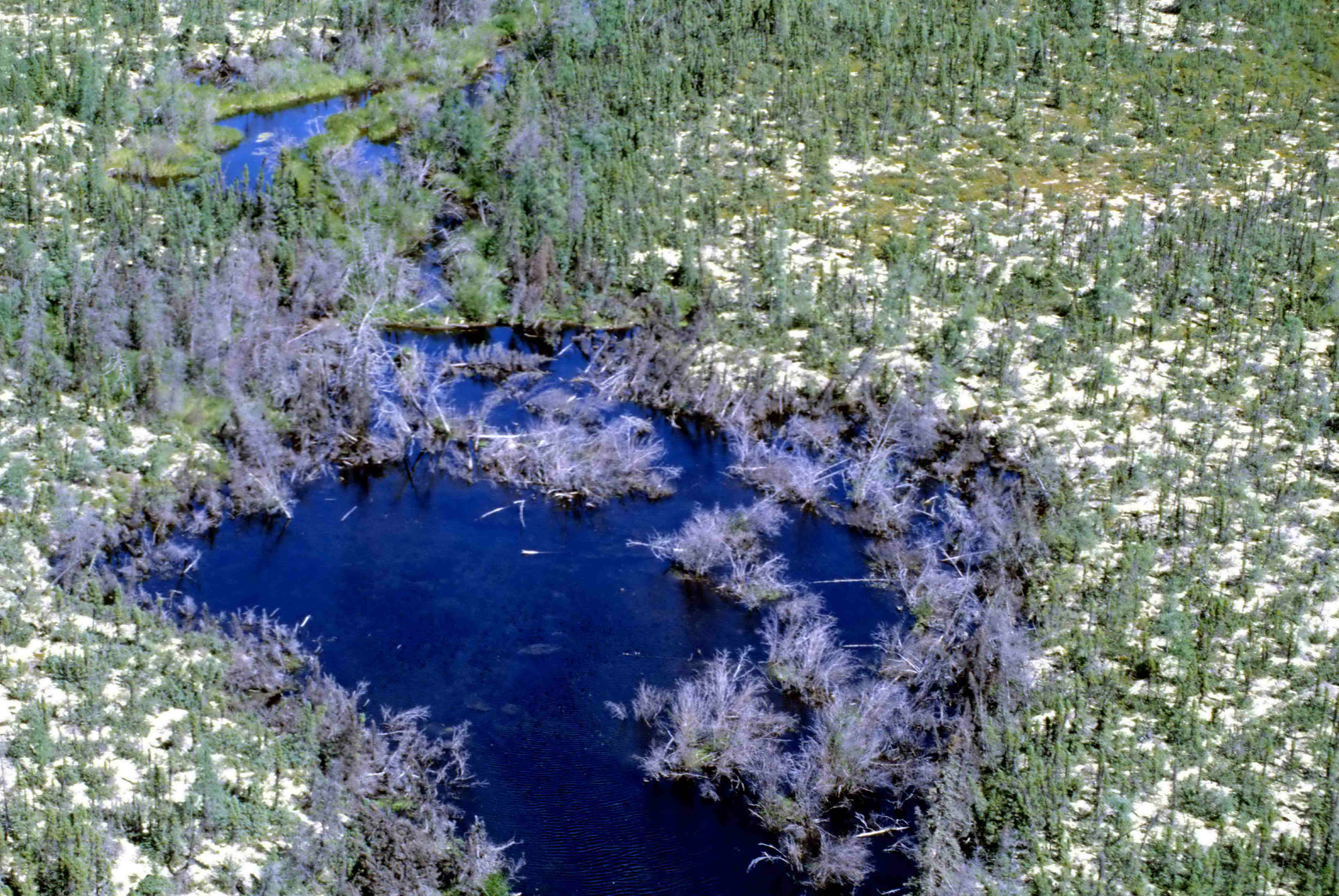
Muskeg with White Caribou Lichen in Wapusk National Park

Wapusk National Park shares its southwestern border with the Churchill Wildlife Management Area (WMA) which was established in 1978. Wapusk National Park itself was established to protect the area which is a unique transitional zone between three biomes and the existing strong biodiversity among plant and animal species. These three biomes include tundra, marine, and boreal. Wapusk National Park was created with future generations in mind, so they can enjoy the park and all its diversity. To ensure this goal is met the Ecological Integrity Monitoring Program (EIMP) builds baseline data to monitor climate change impacts, and the restoration of ecosystems. They work with a variety of external organizations including researchers, provincial governments, and indigenous communities to monitor human and natural change to strengthen resiliency and persistence within ecosystems.

== History ==
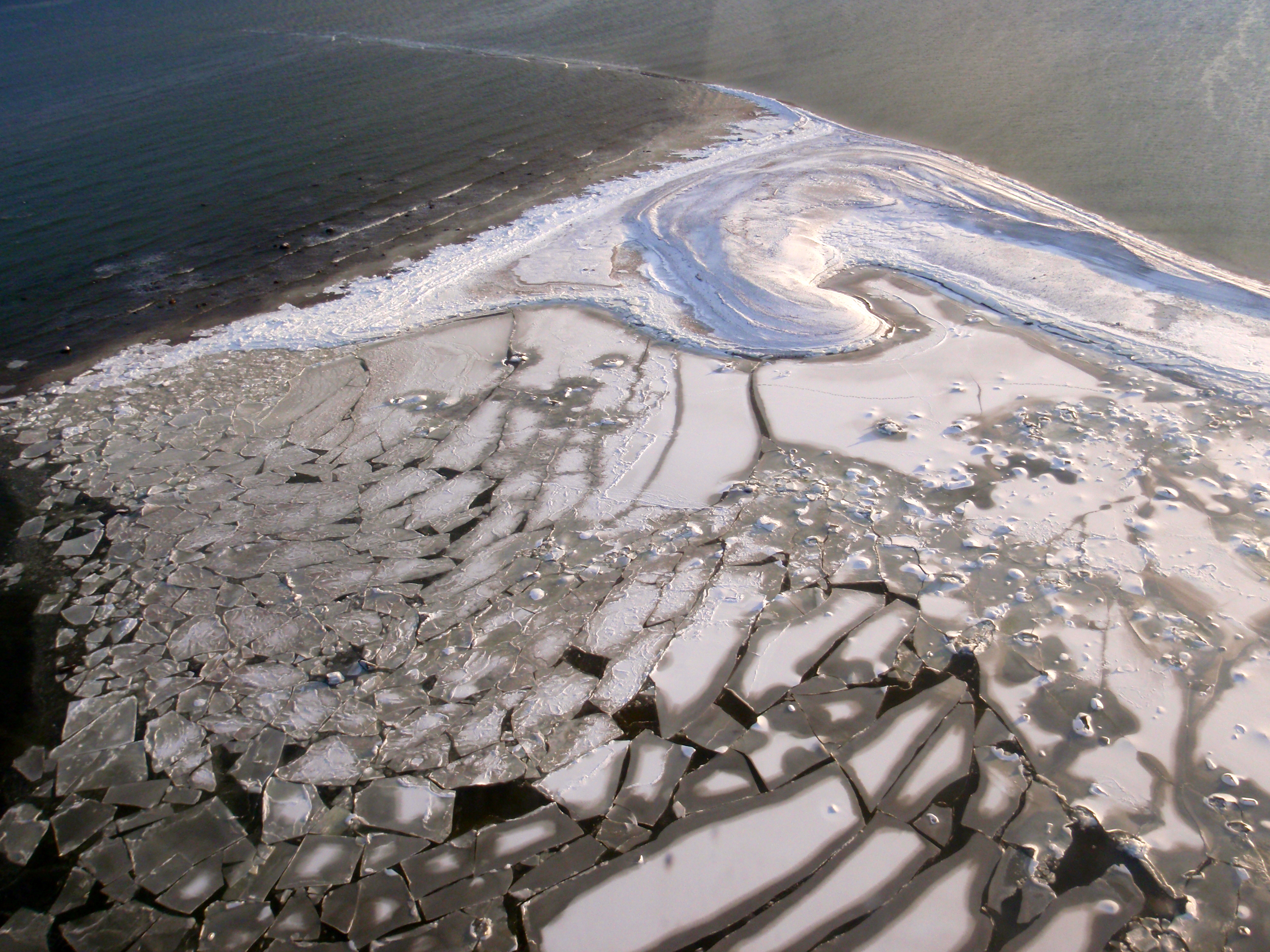
Wapusk ice and land formation

=== Geography outline ===
The park was set up to protect the environment and the Cree traditions. It is a young landscape formed by erosion from the last glacial period, which forms many subarctic habitats. Evidence of this is seen from the glacial features like moraines, eskers and strand lines left by moving glaciers. This glaciation resulted in environments like far extending beaches and plains dipping towards Hudson Bay. The geography consists of coastal tundra habitats with coastal marshes, beach ridges and freshwater sedges which make up the habitats there. The climate here is subarctic and wet, having many rivers and bogs called "Muskeg" by the indigenous Cree people native to that area. In terms of ecology, Wapusk's location is part of the Hudson Plains ecozone.

=== Geology ===
Map of area of interest. Manitoba and Hudson Bay

The historical geology of the Wapusk National Park shows sequences of Palaeozoic aged rocks running northwest to southeast of the map. There are three formations that cover this area: The Severn River formation, Ewkan river formation and Attawapiskat formation. These are all limestone and Dolomite formations. Records of human occupation and resource extractions from Wapusk show the area the national park covers overlaps the indigenous communities of the Cree and Chipewyan indigenous communities.

=== People and trade ===
European settlements also occupied the area as early as 1619 and onwards. The location of the protected park was between two large trade centres, the York Factory and Prince of Wales Fort in 1684 and 1731. Trade relied on the fur found in those parts of Manitoba and lasted for 250 years. In later years,1940's and 1980's, the land was exploited by the military for rocket launch testing by the Churchill Research Range. One of the known historical events to have happened here was the Battle of Hudson's Bay.

== Local Indigenous communities ==
=== Indigenous history ===
Indigenous communities have a strong history and a lasting relationship with the land that is now Wapusk National Park. Wapusk National Park is the traditional territory of the Cree of York Factory First Nation, Fox Lake First Nation, Sayisi-Dene First Nation, and Inuit. The Cree from York Factory relied on the rabbit, geese, bear, and caribou populations as their food sources. No parts of the animals were wasted as they used techniques like smoking, drying, or using the fat for cooking oil. When the caribou moved inland in the winter they would follow. Before industrialization, canoes were modes of transportation on the nearby network of rivers. European traders arrived to the traditional lands of York Factory First Nation in the 1600’s. First Nations shared their ecological knowledge with settlers, and the fur trade began. The Hudson Bay Company established roots in the area because the location was effective for shipping and transportation. 1910 was when Treaty 5 was signed, an agreement with Canada that interfered with traditional resource management defined by the distribution of harvesting and allowing time for resources to recover before the next exploitation.

=== Indigenous involvement in the management of Wapusk National Park ===
In 2008, "Voices from the Margins: The Muskekowuck Athinuwick/Cree People of Northern Ontario and the Management of Wabusk/Polar Bear" was published accounting stories of Indigenous involvement in the decision-making process about the management of polar bears in Wapusk National Park. The Inuit critiqued various proposed management strategies and changes to the national park, for it impacted their traditional practices. Other challenges for Indigenous participation in decision making processes for Wapusk National Park have included geographic isolation from decision-making facilities, and a lack of communication from stakeholders. The Wapusk National Park 2017 Management plan aims to foster greater participation between policy makers and local indigenous communities and incorporate valuable traditional ecological knowledge into management strategies to ensure prosperity for all.

== Species and population trends ==
Wapusk National Park is home to a number of species, including animals and plants. The park shelters polar bears, birds, wolves, caribou, and many more. During the summer, Wapusk is known for their ponds, peat bogs, and small 6.5 foot trees that have remained standing for hundreds of years. The hot weather also attracts tourists with the bay that lies near the shoreline as visitors are able to explore the beaches. It is in the winter when an estimated thousand polar bears make their way through Cape Churchill to familiarize themselves with the cooler weather conditions. At Wapusk National Park, there can also be found over 250 rare bird species. Hundreds of thousands of both shorebirds and waterfowl birds nest here regularly. Other species of birds that can be spotted are great grey owls, stilt sandpipers, snow geese, arctic loons, Caspian terns, peregrine falcons, and much more.

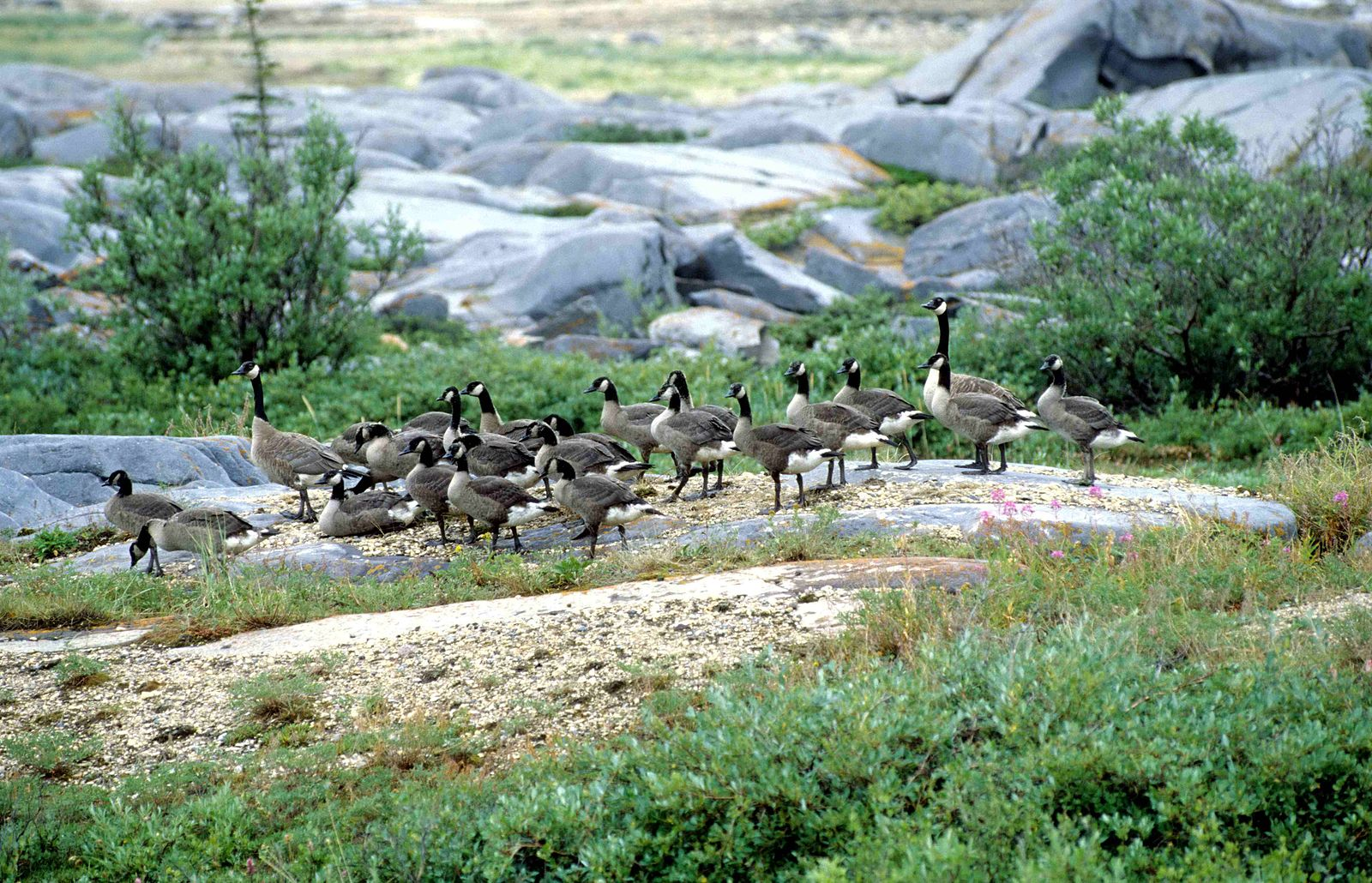
Geese in Wapusk National Park

This park also draws people in due to the several species of plants that reside there. Over one thousand hundred of these species are maintained which is extremely difficult due to the icy conditions of the location. As previously mentioned, bog peat is a popular aspect of the park as about 27% of the grounds are covered in it. The warm weather during the summer allows for certain foods to grow that are also digestible for humans as well as other wildlife. This includes cranberries, crowberries, bearberries, blueberries, cloudberries, and raspberries. As winter arrives, the cold has an effect on the appearance of the park. Not only do the leaves on the trees change colour but the rest of the plants shift shades as well. Other species of plants that bloom at Wapusk are alpine azalea, common yarrow, wild rosemary, roundleaf orchis, cutleaf anemone, field wormwood, and fireweed.

Caribou are one of the most noticeable species at Wapusk National Park that have been steadily declining in population. This is proven from the data collected in 1994 that noted 500, 000 caribou compared to 2017 where only 288, 000 where reported. This data is based on the Qamanirjuaq herd which covers areas in Manitoba, Nunavut, Saskatchewan, and the Northwest Territories. There are a number of active threats against the population of caribou, the first being climate change. The rising hot temperatures are only threatening the cooler environment that they are built to live in. The act of wildfires have also played a role in the caribou decline. Habitat loss has been an important contributor as the human activities of mining, logging, and oil development have impacted caribou habitats. As for conservation efforts, Wapusk National Park is a protected area with limited human disruptions. They take matters in migration routes, calving grounds, and the winter habitats. Parks Canada teamed up with several forestry companies in 2004 to better protect and recover caribou population as they were listed under Threatened Species by the Species at Risk Act (SARA).

== Climate change and habitat loss ==
Wapusk National Park is already being heavily affected by climate change and warming temperatures. The changing dates of sea-ice breakup, up to three weeks earlier than usual, caused by warming temperatures is leading to a decline in the conditions of polar bears who are having to come ashore earlier with less fat resources built up. This has negative impacts on reproduction in terms of litter size, cub mass, survival of dependent young, etc., and affects the overall abundance of polar bears. Tracking the numbers of polar bears is currently very important in these subarctic regions.

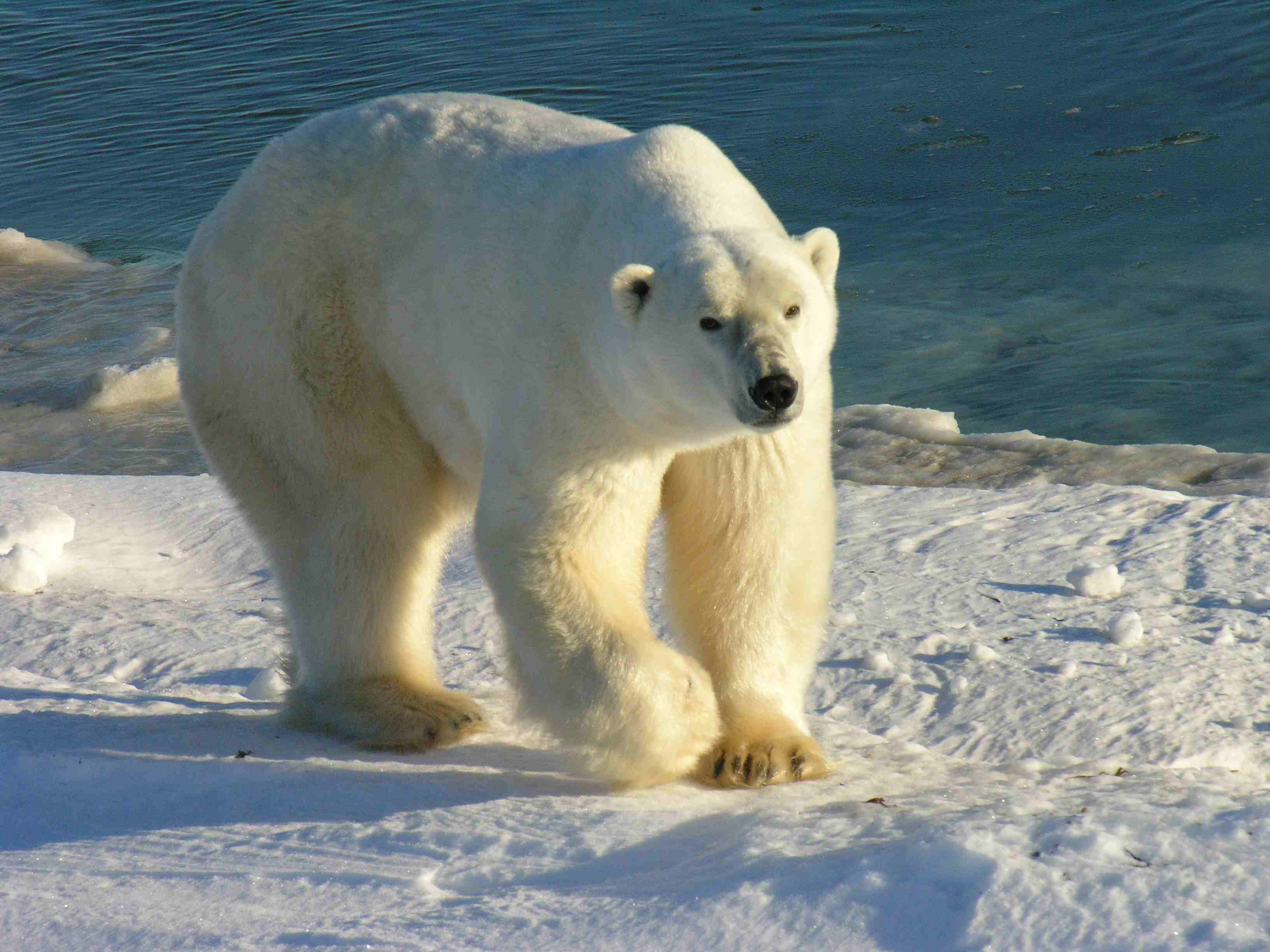
Polar Bear in Wapusk National Park

Caribou are also being affected by the warming temperatures in the case of earlier snow melt, warmer temperatures during the winter and wildfires. These rising temperatures increase insect harassment on caribous. The caribous then exert more energy fleeing this harassment rather than feeding. Caribou feed primarily upon lichens. Climate change has resulted in decreased lichen biomass in arctic regions, a trend that is projected to continue. The increase in wildfires impact lichen biomass and cover, which take up to 75 years to recover from fires.

Climate change is also affecting the vegetation structure of subarctic ecosystems, which impacts the wildlife that depends on these ecosystems. Flooding and raising of bogs impact the polar bear habitat and the reductions in the space of arctic tundra due to permafrost melting has impacts on caribou. The Lesser Snow Geese, a keystone species, are rapidly increasing population wise and are destroying vegetation and soil conditions which is increasing the salinity of nearby bodies of water. This not only affects the aquatic community, but again, polar bears and caribou. Steps are currently being taken by Wapusk National Park to reduce the population and fix the damages done by the geese.

== Tourism ==
Herd of Caribou in Wapusk National Park

Wapusk National Park does not receive many visitors as the only way to access the park is through helicopter overflights or over snow into the denning area in the spring. The majority of park users are scientists, students, and park staff. The visitors usually stay in the Churchill area and do not visit the park, as access is limited to private tours via helicopter, charted aircraft, and over-snow/tundra vehicles and/or all-terrain vehicles.

New tourist activities have been considered after the signing of the Wapusk National Park Management Plan, but there is concern as tundra ecosystems are extremely sensitive to impacts, specifically, human trampling of tundra vegetation. Lichens are the primary food of caribou in winter, are very sensitive to impact and can all die in an area after only low levels of trampling. Increased tourism can create problems for the species living in Wapusk National Park that are already struggling from climate change and habitat loss.

== Rivers ==
- Broad River
- Owl River

== Gallery ==
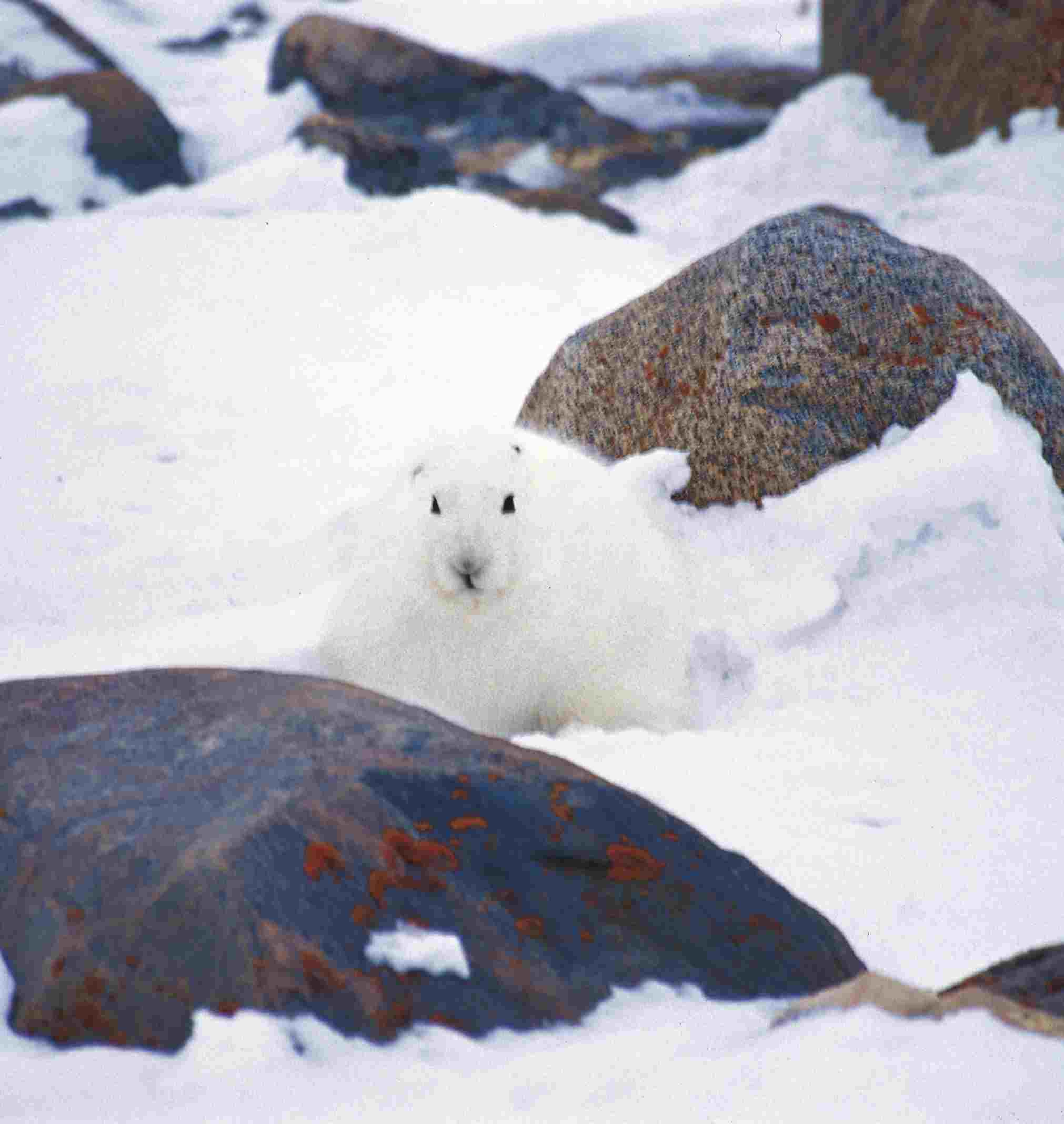
Snowshoe hare

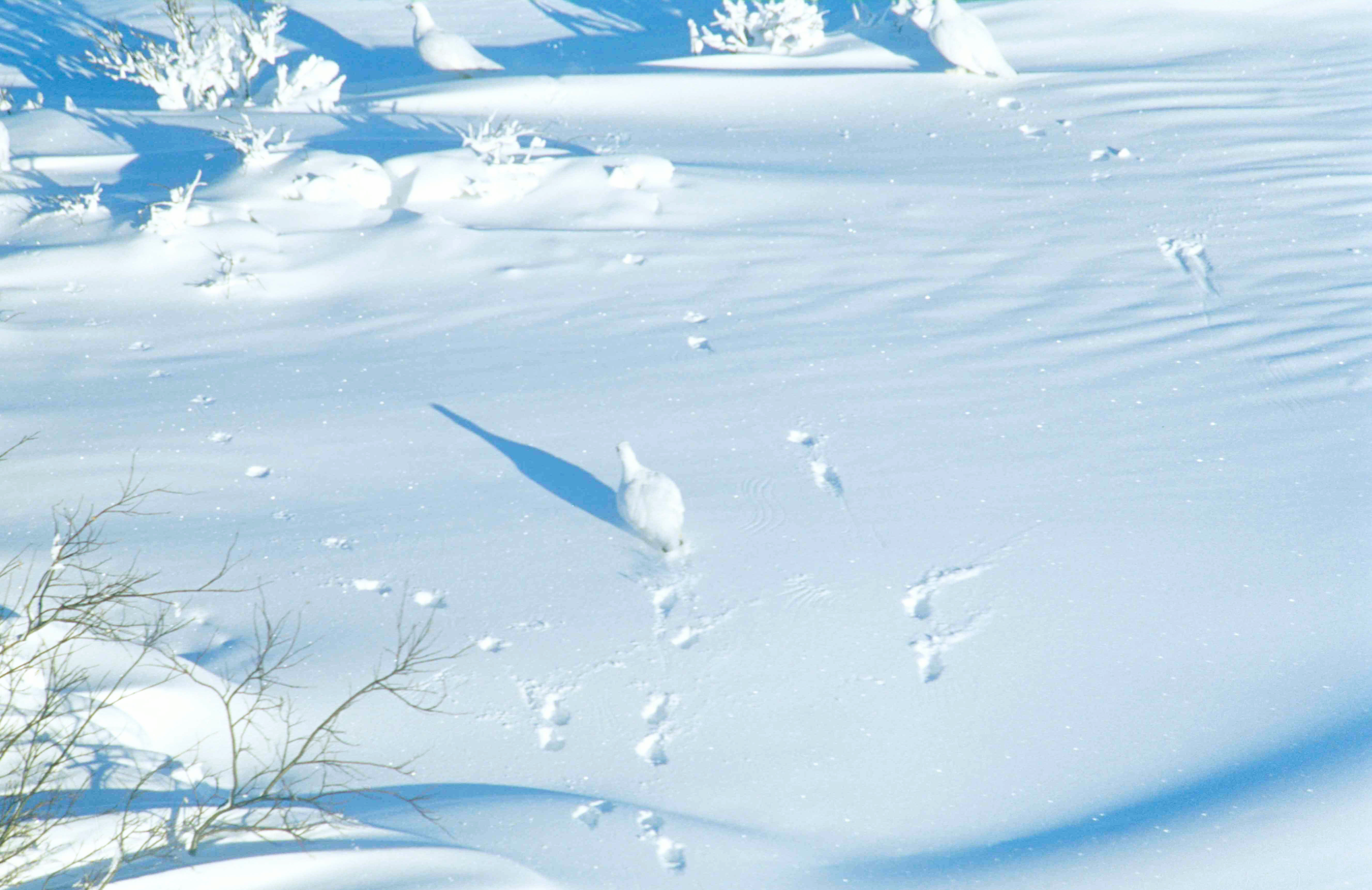
Willow ptarmigan

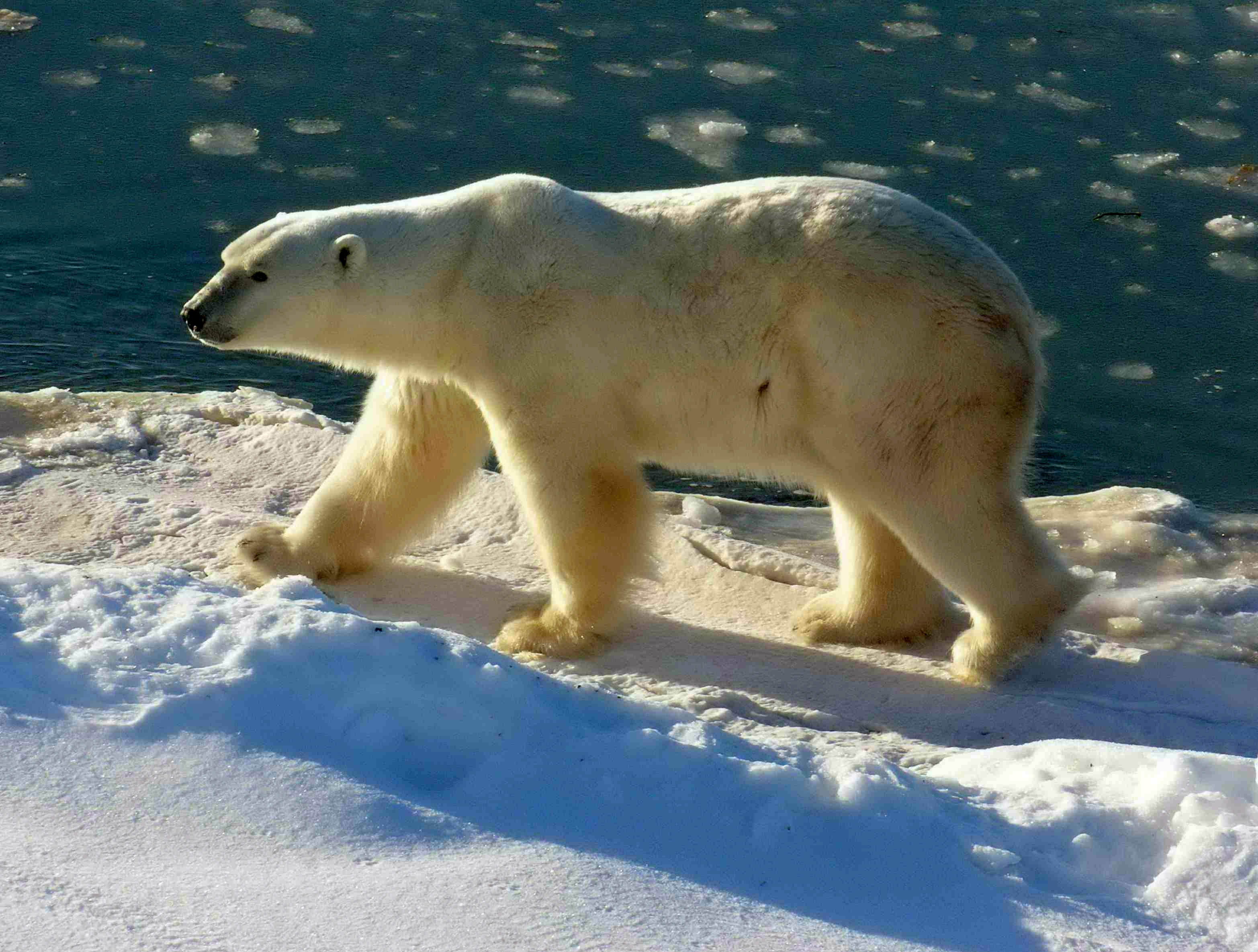
Polar bear at Cape Churchill

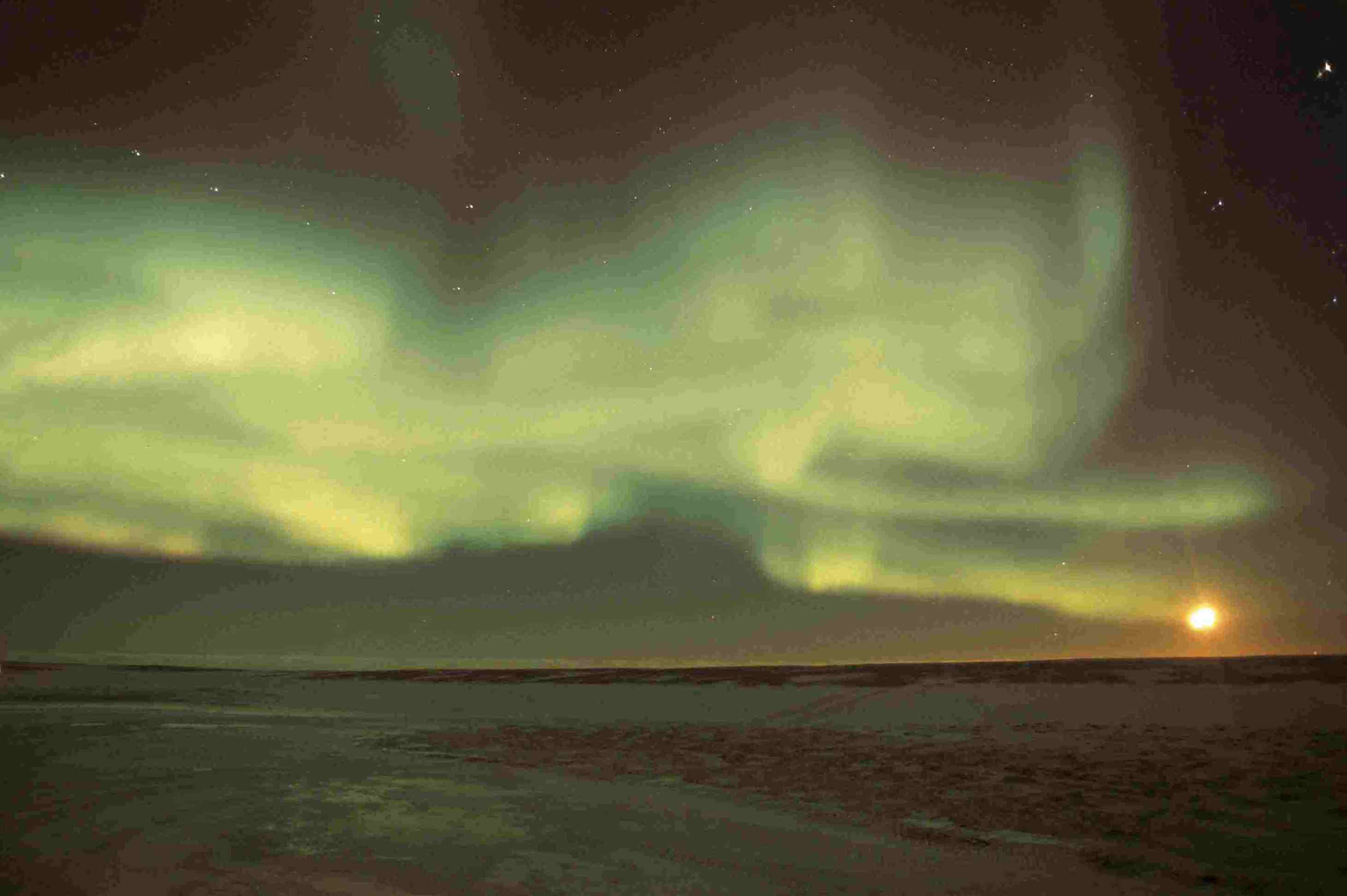
Northern Lights

== See also ==
- National Parks of Canada
- List of National Parks of Canada
- List of Manitoba parks
