= Centigrade (2020 film) =

2020 film directed by Brendan Walsh

- Theatrical release poster
- Directed by: Brendan Walsh
- Screenplay by: Daley Nixon; Brendan Walsh
- Story by: Daley Nixon
- Produced by: Amanda Bowers; Molly Conners; Vincent Morano; Keri Nakamoto; Jane Oster; Bradley J. Ross; Brendan Walsh
- Starring: Genesis Rodriguez; Vincent Piazza
- Cinematography: Seamus Tierney
- Edited by: Bradley J. Ross
- Music by: Trey Toy; Matthew Wang
- Production companies: Manhattan Productions; Phiphen Pictures
- Distributed by: IFC Midnight
- Release date: August 28, 2020
- Running time: 97 minutes
- Country: United States
- Language: English
- Budget: $1-2 million
- Box office: $31,808

Centigrade is a 2020 survival thriller film directed by Brendan Walsh, written by Walsh and Daley Nixon, produced by Amanda Bowers, Molly Conners, Vincent Morano, Keri Nakamoto, Jane Oster, Bradley J. Ross, and Brendan Walsh. It stars Genesis Rodriguez and Vincent Piazza.

The story is about an American man and his pregnant wife who become trapped in their car when a storm buries them underneath layers of snow and ice in Norway. As supplies dwindle and temperatures plunge, the couple must battle the elements and hypothermia in a desperate fight for survival.

Centigrade was released by IFC Midnight to limited theatres and video on demand on August 28, 2020.

== Plot ==
In 2002, a young American couple, Naomi and Matthew, travel to the arctic mountains of Norway. After pulling over during a snowstorm, they wake up trapped in their SUV, buried underneath layers of snow and ice. It is revealed that Naomi is eight months pregnant. They struggle to survive as the temperature drops to dangerous levels and they encounter unforeseen obstacles in their battle to stay alive. With few resources, a dwindling food supply, and nothing but time, tension, blame, and personal secrets bubble to the surface. Matthew and Naomi realize they must work together to survive in a crippling battle against the elements, hypothermia, disturbing hallucinations, and plunging temperatures.

After suffering a panic attack, Naomi goes into labor. Matt helps his wife with the delivery of their baby girl. Naomi suggests they name her Olivia (Liv for short) to which Matt agrees. Matt continues to suffer from hypothermia and frostbite while he is trying to dig through the window.

Naomi struggles to calm her newborn daughter, and Matt offers his coat to help keep the baby warm. The next morning, Naomi awakens to find Matt has died from hypothermia. Days later, Naomi awakens with drops of water on her face. After checking the window, she discovers that the ice is finally soft enough to break through. She grabs her belongings, wraps up the baby, and manages to escape from the vehicle.

After hours of wandering in the wilderness, Naomi finally finds a remote hotel on the outskirts of civilization.

Before the credits roll, it is revealed that Naomi and Olivia were taken to a local hospital and treated for dehydration, hypothermia, frostbite, and severe malnourishment. Experts believe they survived due to the "igloo effect", shielding them from the elements and trapping in any heat they produced.

== Cast ==
- Genesis Rodriguez as Naomi Ibbotson
- Vincent Piazza as Matt Ibbotson
- Benjamin Sokolow as Baby Liv
- Emily Bayiokos as Baby Liv

== Production ==
The original screenplay by Daley Nixon was based on the real-life case of Peter Skyllberg, a Swedish man who was pulled barely alive from his snow-covered car having survived on nothing but snow for two months in sub-zero temperatures. The script was found and optioned through the website InkTip in 2017. The film was shot in sequence. Both actors lost 20lbs during filming.

Principal photography occurred in Staten Island and Norway in 2018 and 2019.

According to star Vincent Piazza "They got two of the identical automobiles. They cut them in different ways so that they can move the camera in unique positions throughout the shoot to create a visual variety and they parked them in an ice cream freezer in Staten Island. They were able to control the temperature, so that was real. There were no gags or gimmicks. It was all real cold that we were enduring."

== Release ==
Centigrade premiered at the Sidewalk Film Festival on August 27, 2020. The film's first trailer premiered via Entertainment Weekly on July 23, 2020. The film also showed as the Midnight Horror Special at the Sarasota Film Festival in May, 2021.

=== Box office ===
Centigrade has grossed $31,808 at the global box office.

=== Critical reception ===
Critics gave the film mixed to negative reviews with a 40% approval rating on Rotten Tomatoes, based on 47 reviews with an average rating of 5.7/10. The website's critics consensus reads: "A survival thriller largely bereft of thrills, Centigrade may leave audiences feeling just as hopelessly trapped as the main characters." On Metacritic, the film has a weighted average score of 46 out of 100, based on eight critics, indicating "mixed or average" reviews.
