= Kamakura (snow dome) =

Traditional festival in northern Japan

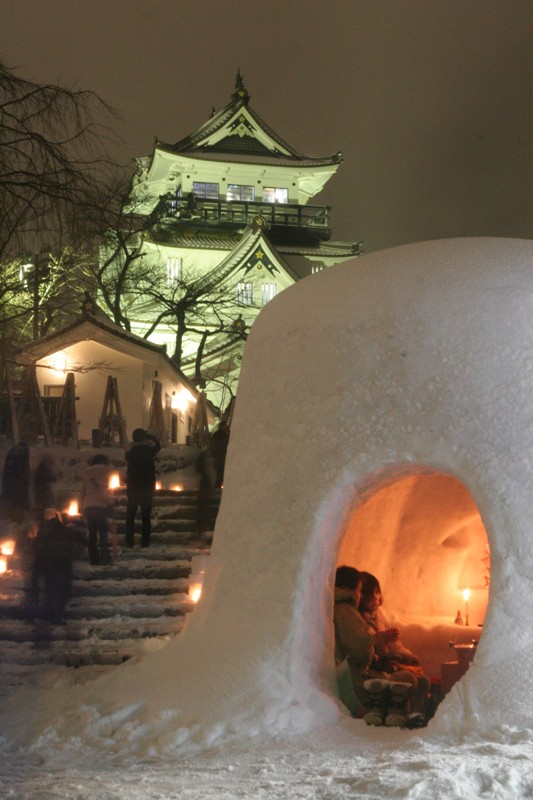
A kamakura winter ice dome near Yokote Castle in Akita prefecture

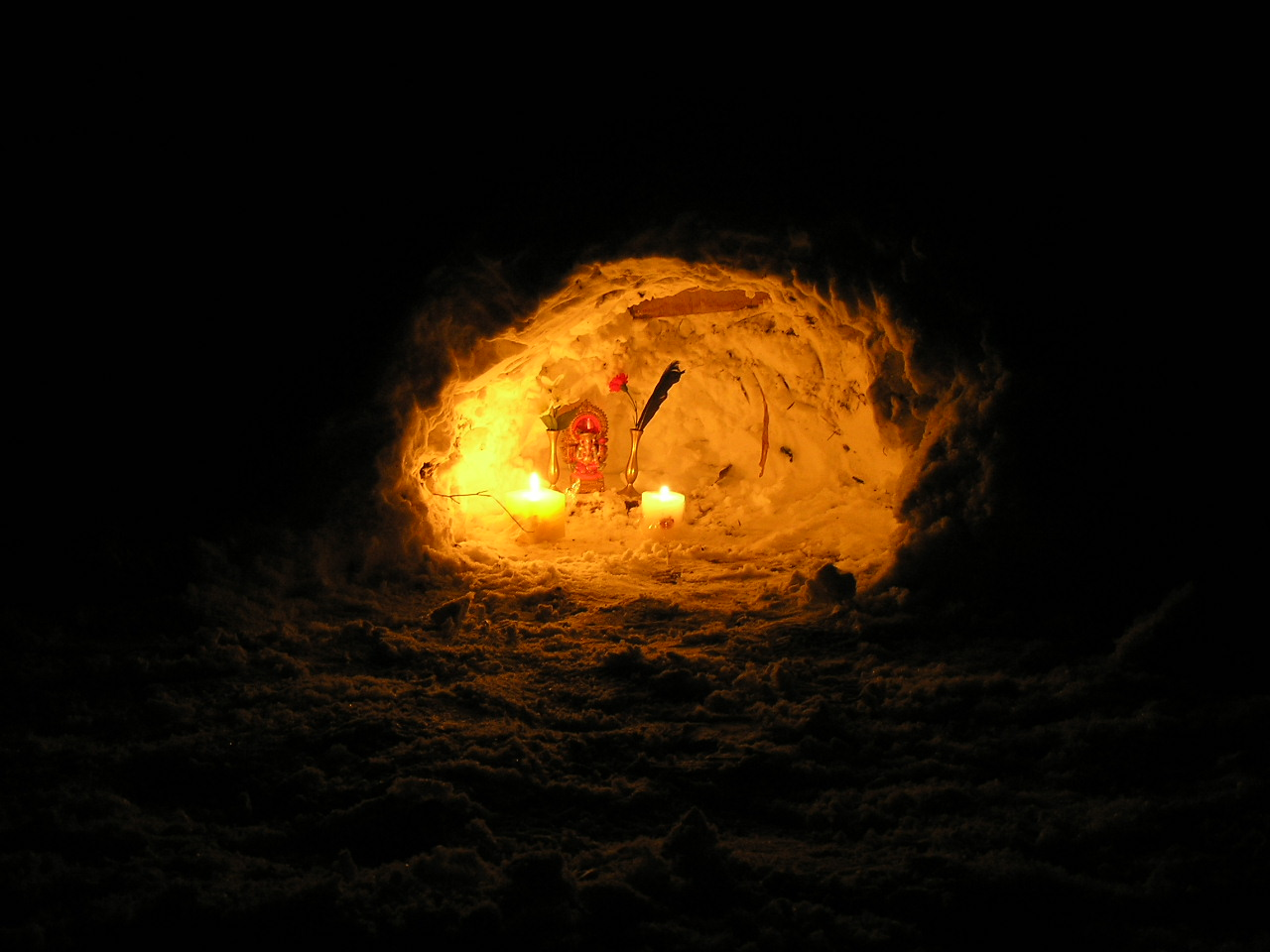
A small kamakura snow hut in Hyogo Prefecture

Kamakura (かまくら or カマクラ) is a type of traditional snow dome or quinzhee in snowy regions of Japan. Kamakura may also refer to the various ceremonial winter celebrations involving those snow domes, or to the Shinto deity Kamakura Daimyojin (鎌倉大明神), who is revered during some of those celebrations. During some kamakura festivals, altars are set up inside domes of snow and Shinto rites are performed.

The ceremonies in some locales are reputedly adaptations of a traditional ceremony once held in the Kyoto Imperial Palace. It appears that the practice of worshipping Suijin, a Shinto god of water, during the winter came to northeastern Japan during the early Kamakura period when the Nikaidō clan became local landowners. This ceremony may have morphed into various winter fire festivals during which villagers pray for good harvests. In the Uonuma region of south-central Niigata Prefecture, the snow domes made for such ceremonies are known as honyara-dō.

One theory holds that the term kamakura arose from the resemblance of many snow domes to round ceramic kilns (窯, kama). A different theory suggests that kamakura is a corruption of kami-kura, (神蔵) which might be translated as a "storehouse of the gods." In either case, the connection with the city of Kamakura in present-day Kanagawa prefecture is tenuous. However, in places where the deity Kamakura Daimyojin is worshipped and Kamakura festivals date back to the days of the Kamakura shogunate, the ceremony might have been one way for the shogunate to ritually display its power.

== Specific Kamakura celebrations ==
=== Yokote Kamakura Festival ===
Winter events with kamakura snow huts are currently held in a number of locations in Japan. For example, in Yokote City in central Akita prefecture such events are celebrated every February 14 to 16. This event likely dates to a time when the Onodera clan ruled that area during the Sengoku period. During Yokote's Kamakura Festival, several hundred snow domes of various sizes dot the city. This event is immediately followed by a Bonden Festival during which Shinto ceremonies occur. Together, both festivals are sometimes jointly described as the "Yokote Snow Festival." In Yokote City, there is also a small museum about the history of kamakura snow domes.

=== Rokugō Kamakura Festival ===
Not far north from Yokote City in the Semboku District of Akita prefecture another kamakura festival is held each February 11 to 15. The "Rokugō Kamakura Festival" has been classified as an Intangible Folk Cultural Asset by the Japanese Agency for Cultural Affairs. This festival is centered around Akita Suwagu Shrine, which is near Iizume Station on the Ōu Main Line. During that festival, numerous kamakura ice houses can be seen. However, photographs reveal that not all of these have a rounded shapes: some have square walls and thatched bamboo roofs. In fact, such structures are known as torioi koya (鳥追小屋, lit. "bird chasing huts"). Moreover, the Shinto deity "Kamakura Daimyojin" is enshrined in some of those ceremonial winter huts. On each February 13 in Rokugō village, children typically visit each other's huts and sing songs about chasing birds. Two days later, there is usually a rice-cake pounding ceremony to celebrate the end of winter. During that time, willow cocoon balls are made to decorate altars of the deity Kamakura Daimyojin. Those cocoon balls are fashioned from rice cakes attached to willow twigs. Other traditional ceremonies are held during this festival such as bamboo pole battles between opposing teams as well as "bonfire battles" featuring blazing long bamboo poles.

=== Narayama Kamakura Festival ===
Much smaller in scale than the previous two festivals, the Narayama Kamakura Festival is held every February 12–15 in Narayama Otamachi, an area part of central Akita City. Originally held during the first full moon of the ancient lunar calendar, the festival falls regularly on the same date of the solar Gregorian calendar.

A makeshift Shinto shrine of snow with bamboo and straw roofing is erected for this festival each year and both Suijin and Kamakura Daimyojin are honored inside that shrine. At one time, only males were allowed inside the shrine, but those gender restrictions have since been lifted. Empty rice bales are stacked inside the shrine of snow. Towards the end of the festival, one of those bales is lit during a special ceremony.

Because a fire broke out during this festival in 1910, the ceremony was banned for sixty years. In 1975, the local neighborhood association revived this event, which attracts many local residents and even some visitors from afar.

=== Other locations ===
Other kamakura festivals are held in places such as Yunishigawa Onsen in northern Tochigi prefecture, Shinhodaka Onsen in a mountainous part of Gifu prefecture, and Kakunodate in Akita prefecture. Kamakura festivals also exist at Lake Shikaribetsu Kohan Onsen in central Hokkaido, Hirosaki Castle in Aomori Prefecture, and a number of other places in Japan with cold winters.

== See also ==
- Glossary of Shinto#K
- Quinzhee – Canadian indigenous snow shelter
- Igloo – Type of shelter built of snow
- Snow cave – Type of building shelter
- Snow fort – Structure made of snow
