= Igloo =

Type of shelter built of snow

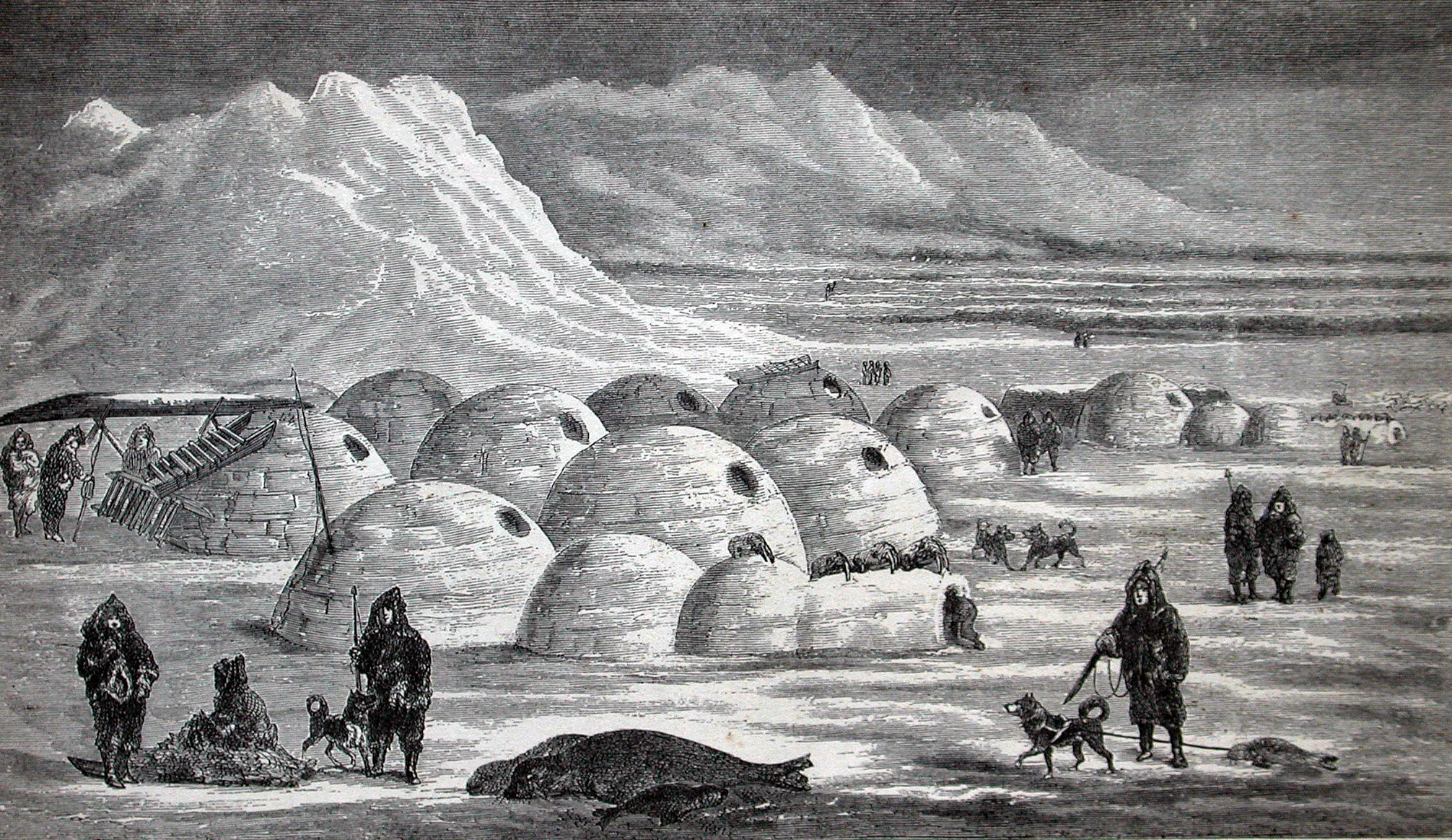
Community of igluit (Illustration from Charles Francis Hall's Arctic Researches and Life Among the Esquimaux, 1865)

An igloo (Inuit languages: iglu or illu, (Note: Iglu is used throughout the Inuvialuit Settlement Region and Nunavut. Illu is used in Nunavik (Arctic Quebec), Nunatsiavut (Labrador), and Greenland.) Inuktitut syllabics ᐃᒡᓗ [iɣˈlu]; plural: igluit ᐃᒡᓗᐃᑦ [iɣluˈit]), also known as a snow house or snow hut, is a type of shelter built of suitable snow.

Although igloos are often associated with all Inuit, they were traditionally used only by the people of Canada's Central Arctic and the Qaanaaq area of Greenland. Other Inuit tended to use snow to insulate their houses, which were constructed from whalebone and hides.

Snow is used because the air pockets trapped in it make it an insulator. Known as the igloo effect, on the outside, temperatures may be as low as −45 °C (−49 °F), but on the inside, the temperature may range from −7 to 16 °C (19 to 61 °F) when warmed by body heat alone.

== Nomenclature ==
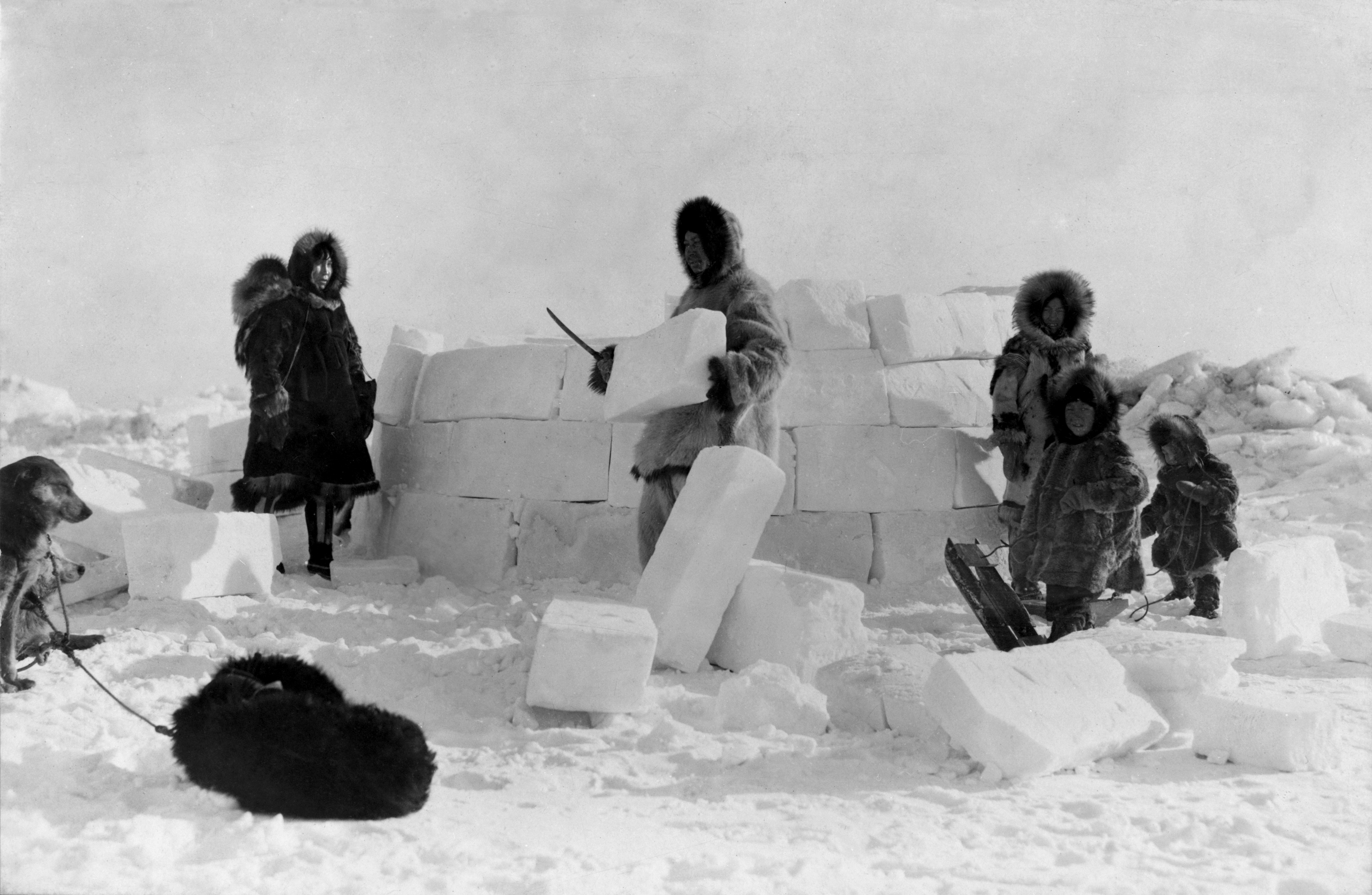
Inuit building an igloo (1924)

In the Inuit languages, the word iglu (plural igluit) can be used for a house or home built of any material. The word is not restricted exclusively to snowhouses (called specifically igluvijaq, plural igluvijait), but includes traditional tents, sod houses, homes constructed of driftwood and modern buildings. Outside Inuit culture, however, igloo refers exclusively to shelters constructed from blocks of compacted snow, generally in the form of a dome.

Several Inuit language dialects throughout the Canadian Arctic (Sallirmiutun (Siglitun), Inuinnaqtun, Natsilingmiutut, Kivalliq, North Baffin) use iglu for all buildings, including snowhouses, and it is the term used by the government of Nunavut. An exception to this is the dialect used in the Igloolik region of Nunavut. Iglu is used for other buildings, while igluvijaq (plural igluvijait, Inuktitut syllabics: ᐃᒡᓗᕕᔭᖅ) is specifically used for a snowhouse.

== Types ==
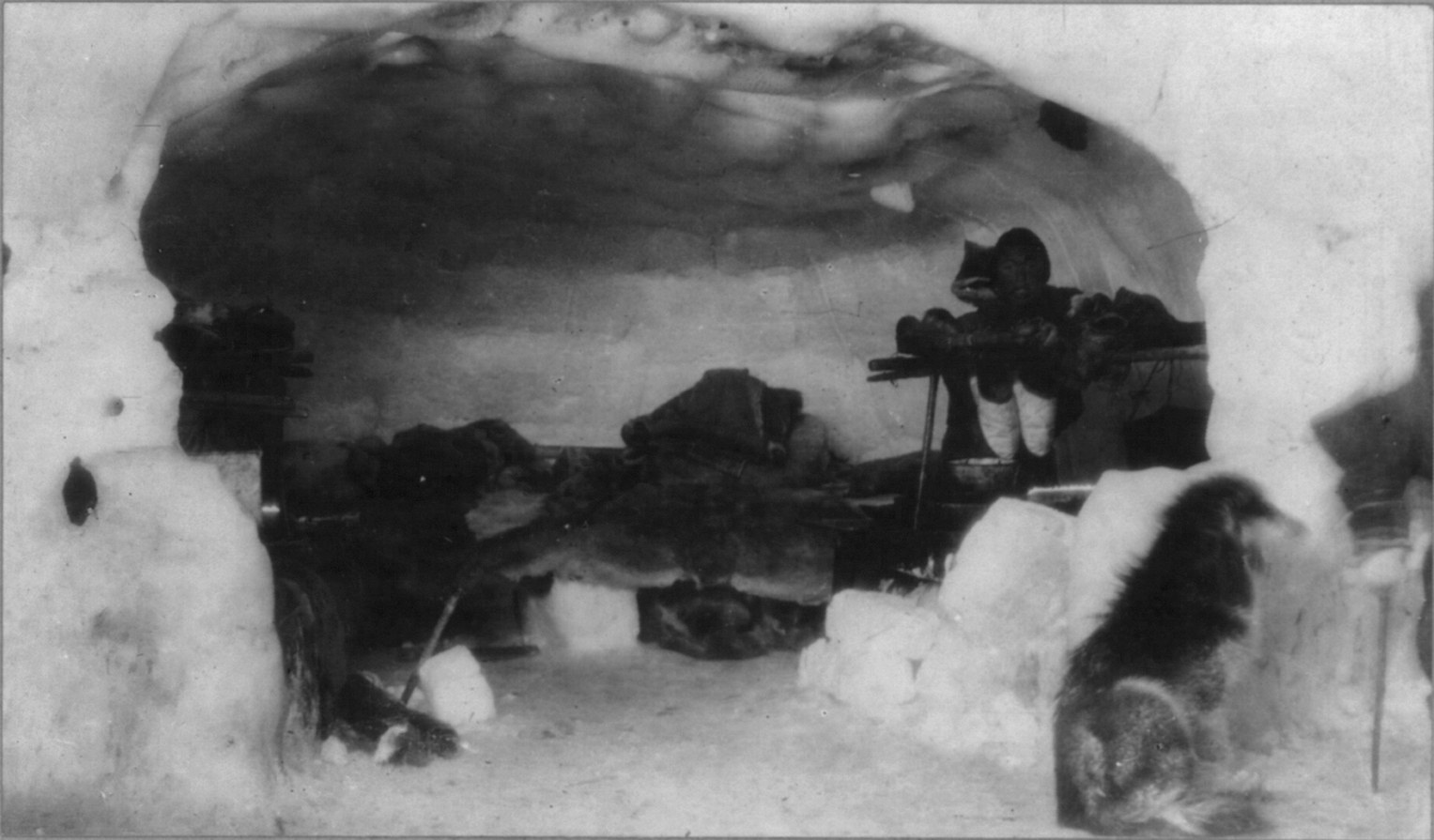
Interior of an igloo (early 1900s)

There are three traditional types of igloo, ranging in size from small to large and used for a different purpose.

The smallest igloos are constructed as temporary shelters. They are usually used for one or two nights. On rare occasions these small igloos are used during hunting trips, which are often on open sea ice.

Intermediate-sized igloos were for semi-permanent, family dwelling. This was usually a single room that housed one or two families. Often there were several of them in a small area forming an Inuit village.

The largest igloos were normally built in groups of two. One of the buildings was a temporary structure for special occasions whilst the other one was built nearby as a dwelling. These large igloos could have up to five rooms and house 20 people. A large igloo could be constructed from several smaller igloos attached by their tunnels, giving common access to the outside. These large igloos were used to hold community feasts and traditional dances.

== Construction ==
Film clip of the construction of an igloo from beginning to end (1922)

Snow igloos are not spherical but are built in a catenary, a curved shape more closely resembling a paraboloid. Using this shape, the stresses of snow as it ages and compresses are less likely to cause it to buckle because in an inverted paraboloid or catenoid the pressures are nearer to being exclusively compressive.

The individual snow bricks are cut out with saws and machete-like blades. They are originally cut out in a four-sided shape, and later into five- or six-sided shapes to increase structural interlocking, similar to the stones used in the architecture of the Inca Empire.

Igloos gradually become shorter with time due to the compressive creep of the snow.

== Building methods ==
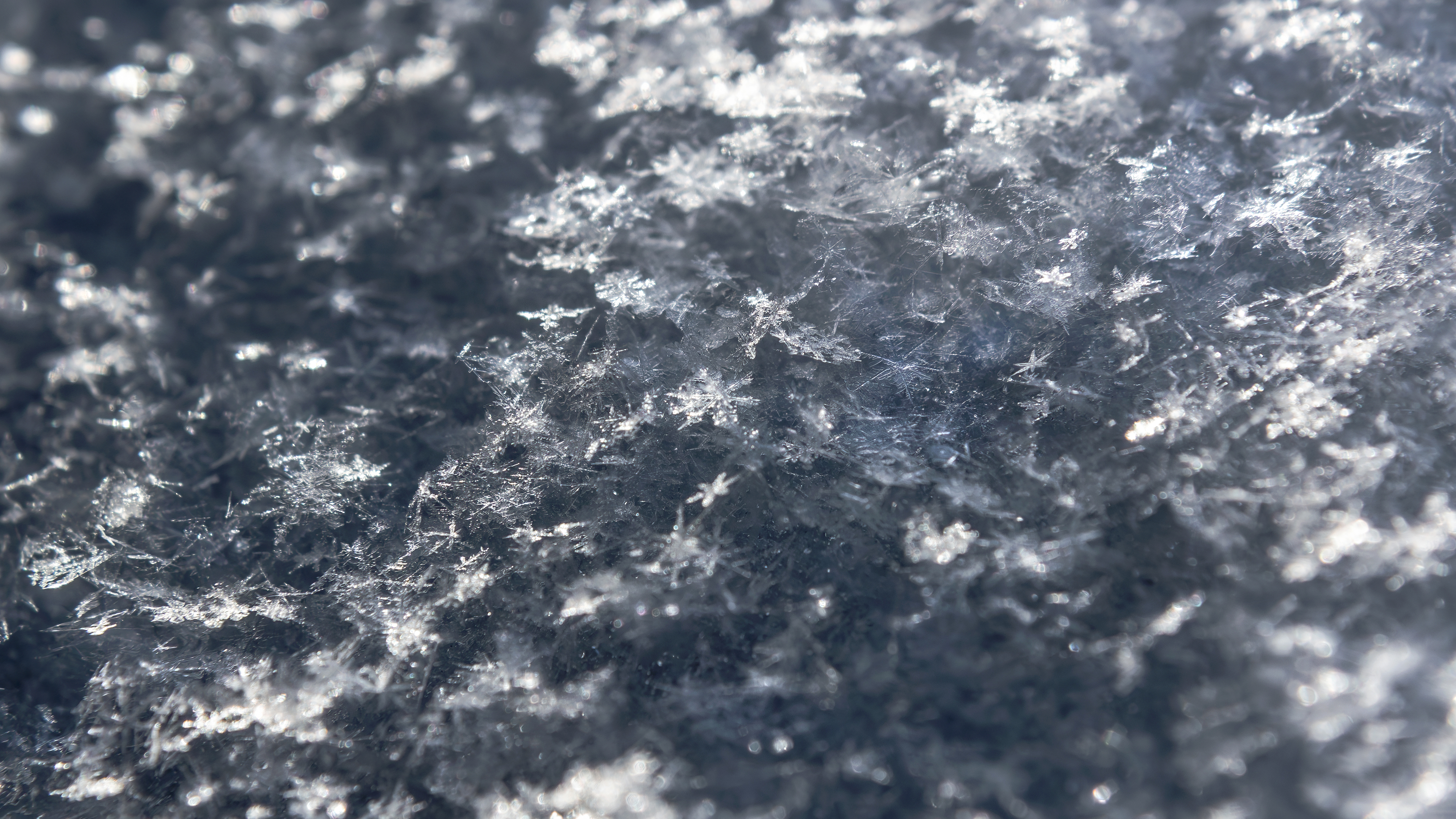
Closeup of snow, revealing how much air there is between the snow crystals.

The snow used to build an igloo must have enough structural strength to be cut and stacked appropriately. The best snow to use for this purpose is snow which has been blown by wind, which can serve to compact and interlock the ice crystals. Snow that has settled gently to the ground in still weather is not useful. The hole left in the snow, where the blocks are cut, is usually used as the lower half of the shelter.

Snow's insulating properties enable the inside of the igloo to remain relatively warm. In some cases, a single block of clear freshwater ice is inserted to allow light into the igloo. Igloos used as winter shelters had beds made of loose snow, skins, and caribou furs. Sometimes, a short tunnel is constructed at the entrance, to reduce wind and heat loss when the door is opened. Animal skins or a snow block can be used as a door.

The igloo is architecturally unique in that it is a dome that can be raised out of independent blocks leaning on each other and polished to fit without an additional supporting structure during construction. An igloo that is built correctly will support the weight of a person standing on the roof.

Traditionally, an igloo might be deliberately consolidated immediately after construction by making a large flame with a qulliq (kudlik, stone lamp), briefly making the interior very hot, which causes the walls to melt slightly and settle. Body heat is also adequate, although slower. This melting and refreezing builds up a layer of ice that contributes to the strength of the igloo.

Igloo construction

An igloo side view diagram; opening to the right, the optional window may be composed of a sheet of freshwater ice

An igloo's snowbrick laying method

The sleeping platform is a raised area. With warmer air rising and cooler air settling, the entrance area acts as a cold trap whereas the sleeping area will hold whatever heat is generated by a stove, lamp, body heat, or other device. The Central Inuit, especially those around the Davis Strait, lined the living area with skin, which could increase the temperature within from around 2 °C (36 °F) to 10–20 °C (50–68 °F).

Igloos

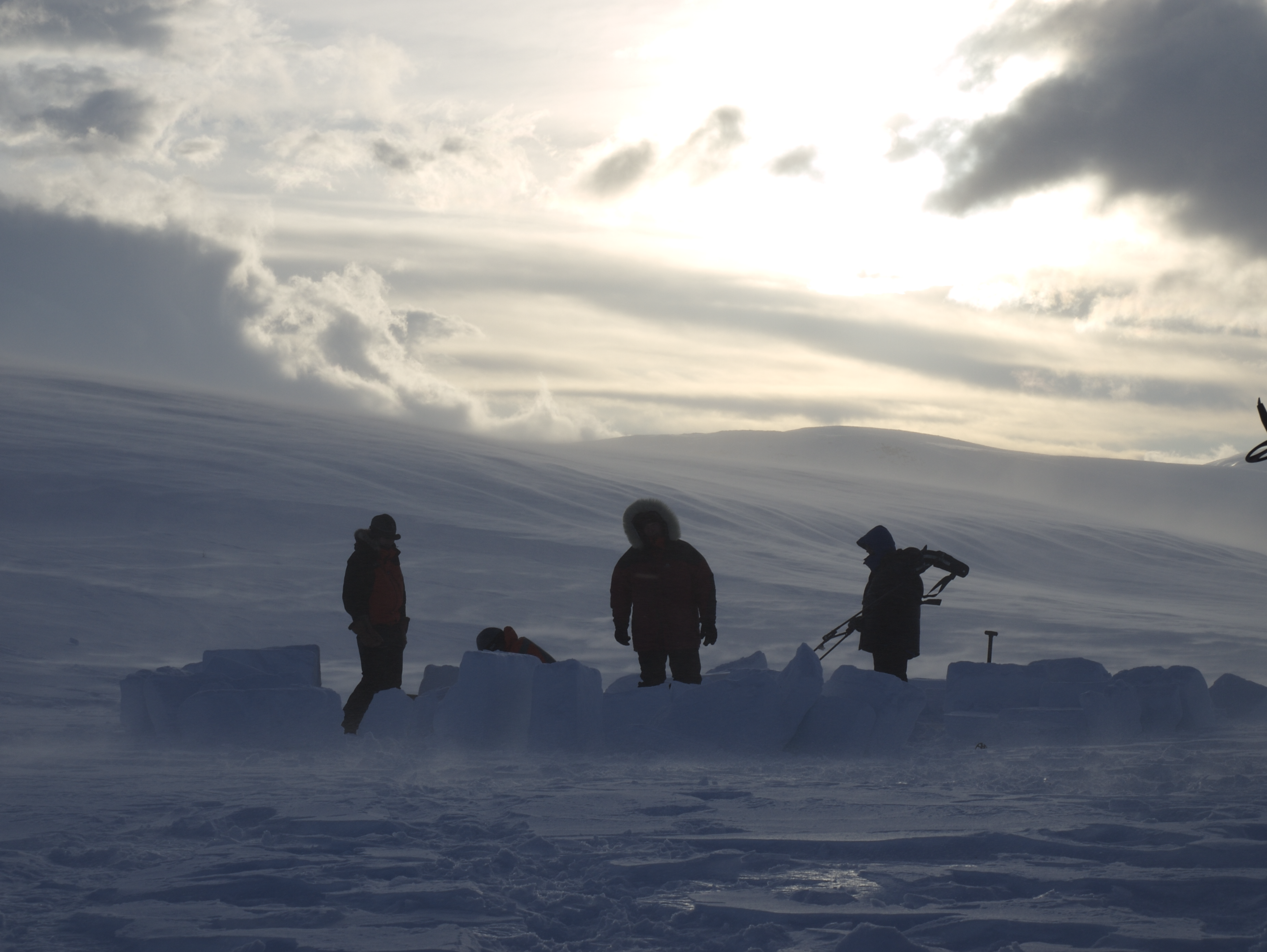
Process of building an igloo with snowbrick method in mid-way

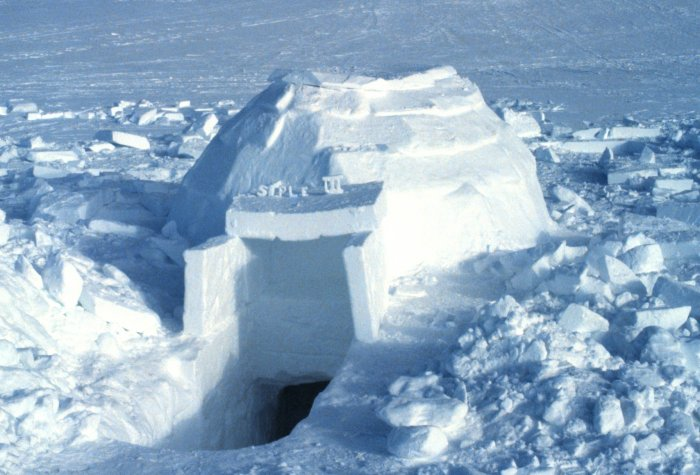
A nearly complete, medium-sized igloo, with excavation under the door and the exterior unfinished

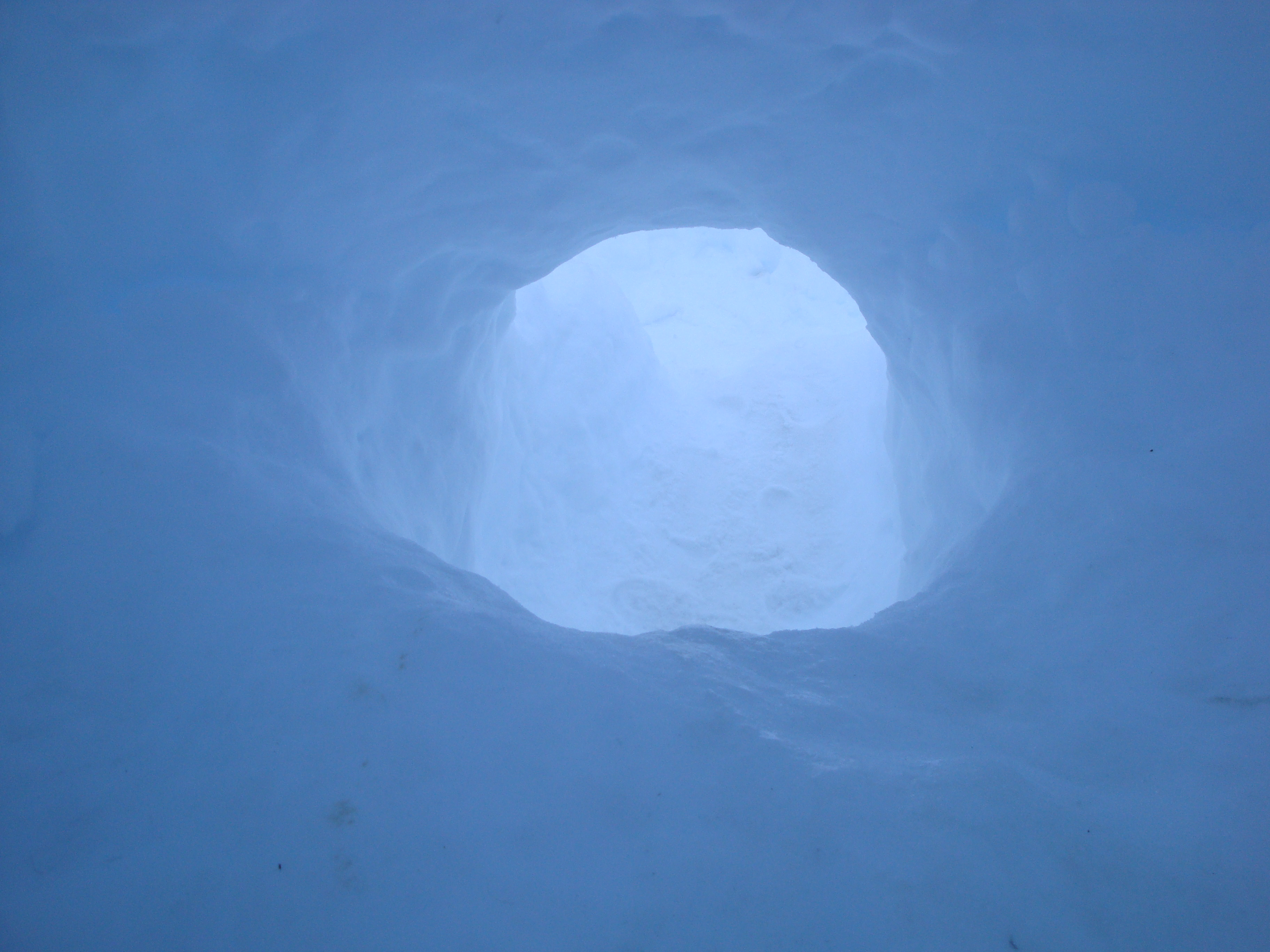
Interior of an igloo, facing the passageway leading to the entrance

== See also ==
- Glacier cave – Cave formed within the ice of a glacier
- Quinzhee – Canadian indigenous snow shelter
- Snow cave – Type of building shelter
- Snow fort – Structure made of snow
- Vernacular architecture – Architecture based on local needs, materials, traditions
- Kamakura (snow dome) – Traditional festival in northern Japan
- Early and simple domes
