= Quinzhee =

Canadian indigenous snow shelter

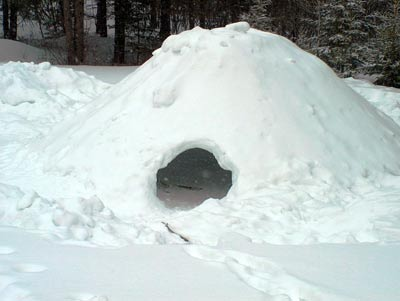
Exterior of a quinzhee, facing the entrance

A quinzhee or quinzee (/ˈkwɪnziː/) is a Canadian snow shelter made from a large pile of loose snow that is shaped, then hollowed. This is in contrast to an igloo, which is built up from blocks of hard snow, and a snow cave, constructed by digging into the snow. The word is of Athabaskan origin and entered the English language by 1984. A quinzhee can be made for winter camping and survival purposes, or for fun.

A similar, but more elaborate snow house is called a lumitalo.

== Differences between a quinzhee and an igloo ==
Quinzhees typically have an inside height after excavation which allows for sitting or crouching but not standing.

The snow for a quinzhee does not need to be of the same quality as required for an igloo. Quinzhees are not usually meant to be long-term shelters, while igloos can be used for seasonal habitation. Constructing quinzhees is much easier than igloos, although the overall result is somewhat less sturdy and more prone to collapsing in harsh weather conditions. Quinzhees are normally constructed in times of necessity for survival, so aesthetic and long-term dwelling considerations are normally exchanged for economy of time and materials.

== Construction ==
Quinzhees are typically built in flat areas where snow is abundant, on days colder than −4 °C (25 °F). Builders break up layers of naturally fallen snow into powder and thoroughly mix bottom and top layers of snow to increase sintering, thus strengthening the eventual structure. Snow is typically piled 1.5 to 2 metres (5 to 7 ft) high in a dome 3 to 4 metres (10 to 13 ft) in diameter. It is then left for at least 2 hours to sinter, allowing both temperature and moisture in the snow to homogenize and the snow crystals to bond with each other. Packing can speed the bonding process and strengthen the structure. Small sticks, approximately 30 to 35 centimetres (12 to 14 in) are pushed into the structure to act as thickness guides when the interior is hollowed out. According to Halfpenny and Ozane (1989), the wall at the base should be at least 30 centimetres (12 in) wide and at the top about 20 centimetres (8 in) thick, though wall-base thicknesses of more than 60 centimetres (2.0 ft) are possible.

Excavation may be accomplished more quickly if large blocks of interior snow are carved and slid out through a large, temporary "excavation door." Structural strength increases when all interior wall and ceiling surfaces follow an arched curve, with no flat sections. Once excavation is complete the excavation door can be permanently blocked using previously excavated blocks, and a smaller permanent door can be cut in the most desirable spot. Time and effort are required to hollow out the center of a quinzhee, though these can be reduced by piling snow around a hollow structure, such as a tarp-covered pile of packs or a makeshift tent or dome.

Melting and refreezing the inner surface of the quinzhee can strengthen it, as it does an igloo; this can be done rapidly with a lamp or candle, but body heat is also adequate.

Allowing the interior temperature to rise above freezing point risks weakening the shelter significantly, especially if the outside air temperature is near freezing. A small hole for air circulation should be poked through the ceiling. To avoid dripping melt-water, irregular or bumpy surfaces can be smoothed to direct the flow of water down the walls to gather around the edges. A non-airtight fabric door cover will minimize the amount of cold air coming into the quinzhee. An empty, well built snow structure, 16 or more hours old, in weather below −12 °C (10 °F) may be strong enough to support a group of adults standing on top of it.

== Dangers ==
All snow shelters eventually collapse or melt. Quinzhees can collapse from poor snow conditions, warm weather, blowing rain, construction problems (hitting a supporting wall), failure to let the snow sinter long enough, or from people climbing on them. Collapse poses a danger of suffocation for occupants.

Quinzhees should not be used when temperatures are warmer than −4 °C (25 °F) due to risk of collapse. The greatest risk of collapse occurs during the excavation process. Longer sintering time generally reduces risk of excavation collapse. To reduce undue loading on the roof of the quinzhee, the interior ceiling should be excavated first, then the interior walls and floor. One person should be outside the quinzhee while another is digging inside. Place a shovel, branch, hiking pole, or such near the head of a sleeping person for roof support, to break a falling roof to create an air gap, and/or as a tool to dig out. One shovel should be left outside to mark the door and aid rescuers in digging occupants out. Some users prefer a marker to be left outside the quinzhee nearest the heads of sleeping occupants to indicate where rescuers should start digging.

== Lumitalos ==
A lumitalo is a more elaborate snow-house or building made out of snow in a manner similar to a quinzhee. The term is Finnish in origin, and literally means “snow house”.

The city of Houghton, Michigan, builds a lumitalo as part of its annual Winter Carnival held by Michigan Technological University.

== See also ==
- Igloo – Type of shelter built of snow
- Kamakura (snow dome) – Traditional festival in northern Japan
- Snow cave – Type of building shelter
- Snow fort – Structure made of snow

== Bibliography ==
- Halfpenny, James C. & Roy Ozanne (1989). Winter: An Ecological Handbook. Boulder, CO: Johnson Books. pp. 230–234.
