= Maternity den =

Lair where the mother gives birth and nurtures the young

A maternity den is a lair where a mother animal gives birth and nurtures her young when they are in a vulnerable life stage. While dens are typically subterranean, they may also be snow caves or simply beneath rock ledges. Characteristically there is an entrance, and optionally an exit corridor, in addition to a principal chamber.

== Examples ==
=== Polar bear ===
The polar bear (Ursus maritimus) creates a maternity den either in an earthen subterranean or in a snow cave. On the Hudson Bay Plain in Manitoba, Canada, many of these subterranean dens are situated in the Wapusk National Park, from which bears migrate to the Hudson Bay when the ice pack forms. The maternity den is the bear's shelter for most of the winter.

When all the other polar bears are heading off to the openness of the ocean, the pregnant female polar bears begin looking for a maternity den. This maternity den is usually in a snow bank, or along an ice patch of ocean shore. It is here that the female polar bear will go into a hibernation type state. Female polar bears dig their own maternity den. It is important the the [sic] female polar bears have fed enough in the spring and summer before fall, because of the scarcity of food on land when winter comes. While in the maternity den, the mother polar bear will not eat, drink or defecate. The female polar bear will stay in the maternity den and give birth to her cubs.

=== Wild dogs ===
Pack members may guard the maternity den used by the alpha female; such is the case with the African wild dog, Lycaon pictus.

=== Brown hyena ===
The brown hyena (Parahyaena brunnea) makes use of maternity dens as a means of nurturing and protecting their cubs. These dens are located in coastal or inland regions, most of them being caverns with narrow entrances. The brown hyena also collects bones and stores them within or around the entrance of these dens.

=== Red fox ===
The red fox (Vulpes vulpes) also creates maternity dens. After mating, foxes make a maternity den for raising their offspring. Most often, the mother and father will find and enlarge an old woodchuck burrow. Sometimes, a hollow log, streambank, rock pile, cave, or dense shrub will play the role as a den. The den is usually chosen at a place where there is raised ground so the red foxes can see all around. The main entrance will be approximately three feet wide, and the den will have one or two escape holes. The den is lined with grass and dry leaves.

== See also ==
- Pregnancy
- Burrow
