= Broad River (Manitoba) =

- Location of the mouth of the Broad River in Manitoba

Location
- Country: Canada
- Province: Manitoba
- Region: Northern
- Census division: 23

Physical characteristics
- Source: Unnamed lake
  - coordinates: 57°34′22″N 94°18′01″W
  - elevation: 108 m (354 ft)
- Mouth: Hudson Bay
  - coordinates: 58°08′13″N 92°50′58″W
  - elevation: 0 m (0 ft)

Basin features
- River system: Hudson Bay drainage basin

The Broad River is a river in the Hudson Bay drainage basin in Census division 23 in Northern Manitoba, Canada. Its flows from an unnamed lake to Hudson Bay.

The river is crossed north of the settlement of O'Day by the Hudson Bay Railway, travelled by the Via Rail Winnipeg – Churchill train.

A large portion of the river from its mouth upstream is part of Wapusk National Park.

A site near the mouth of the river was considered for an atomic weapons proving ground for British nuclear testing with the cooperation of the Canadian government, but the Monte Bello Islands off the Northwestern coast of Australia was selected instead.

== See also ==
- List of rivers of Manitoba
