= Igloo effect =

Thermal insulation in snow structures

The Igloo effect refers to the phenomenon that allows igloos and similar structures to remain warm on the inside, despite being made of snow and located in frigid environments. The effect is primarily due to two factors–thermal insulation and body heat.

== Description ==
Side-way representation of the structure of an igloo.

An igloo is a type of shelter constructed with snow blocks and are often located in frigid environments. The igloo effect refers to the phenomenon where snow structures, such as the igloos, maintain a higher or warmer interior temperature compared to the outside environment despite being made of ice or snow. The snow contains a large number of trapped air pockets between ice crystals, which has a low thermal conductivity, and hence serves as an effective thermal insulation, thereby significantly reducing heat transfer between the interior and exterior of the structure. As a result of this insulation, any heat generated inside the igloo, such as body heat from the occupants and other heat sources, is retained within the structure.

Whilst snow itself has a temperature lower than 0 °C (32 °F) i.e. the freezing point of water, a well-constructed igloo can maintain an average temperature of 16 °C (61 °F) even if heated internally only by body heat of an occupant. However, in an igloo, the thermal characteristics and the insulation effect depends on the snow conditions, and the other parameters such as the size, structure, and arrangement of the shelter. During the construction of the igloo, if the blocks are thicker, they can cause excessive heating and risk melting. When warm air diffuses into the interior, it rises to the roof and forms a thermal gradient that keeps cold air from reaching it. Hence, an igloo with a higher dome has a higher temperature than a low dome igloo, though smaller igloos require less heating than larger ones to achieve the same temperature level.

== Examples ==
In 2012, a Swedish man, who was trapped in his car for two months, had been insulated from the −30 °C (−22 °F) outside weather by snow which had created an igloo around his vehicle, and later made a full recovery.
