= Snow cave =

Type of building shelter

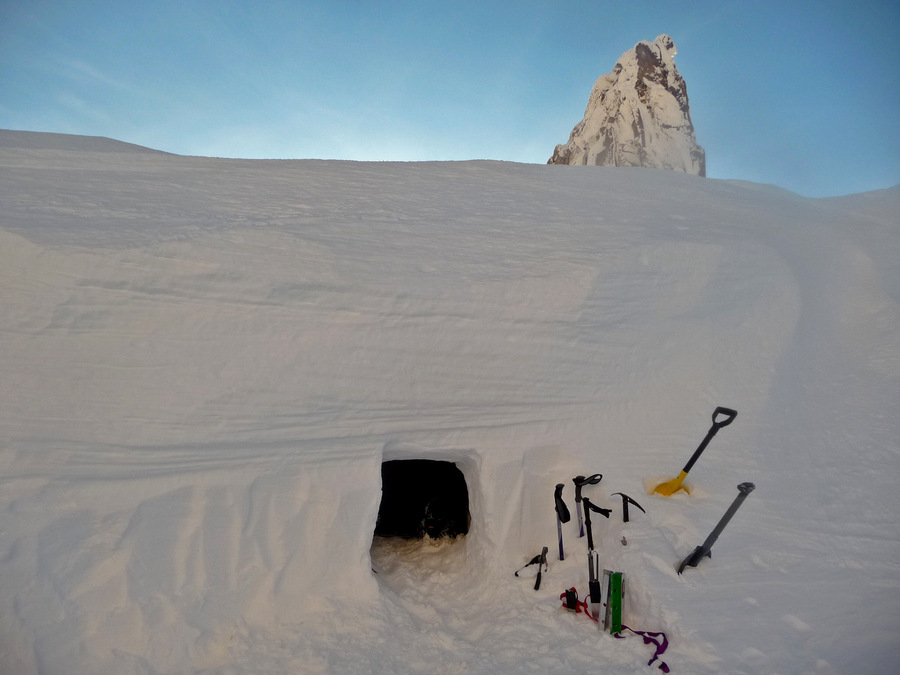
Snow cave, Mount Hood, Oregon

A snow cave is a shelter constructed from snow by certain animals in the wild, human mountain climbers, winter recreational enthusiasts, and winter survivalists. It has thermal properties similar to an igloo and is particularly effective at providing protection from wind as well as low temperatures. A properly made snow cave can be 0 °C (32 °F) or warmer inside, even when outside temperatures are −40 °C (−40 °F).

== Construction ==
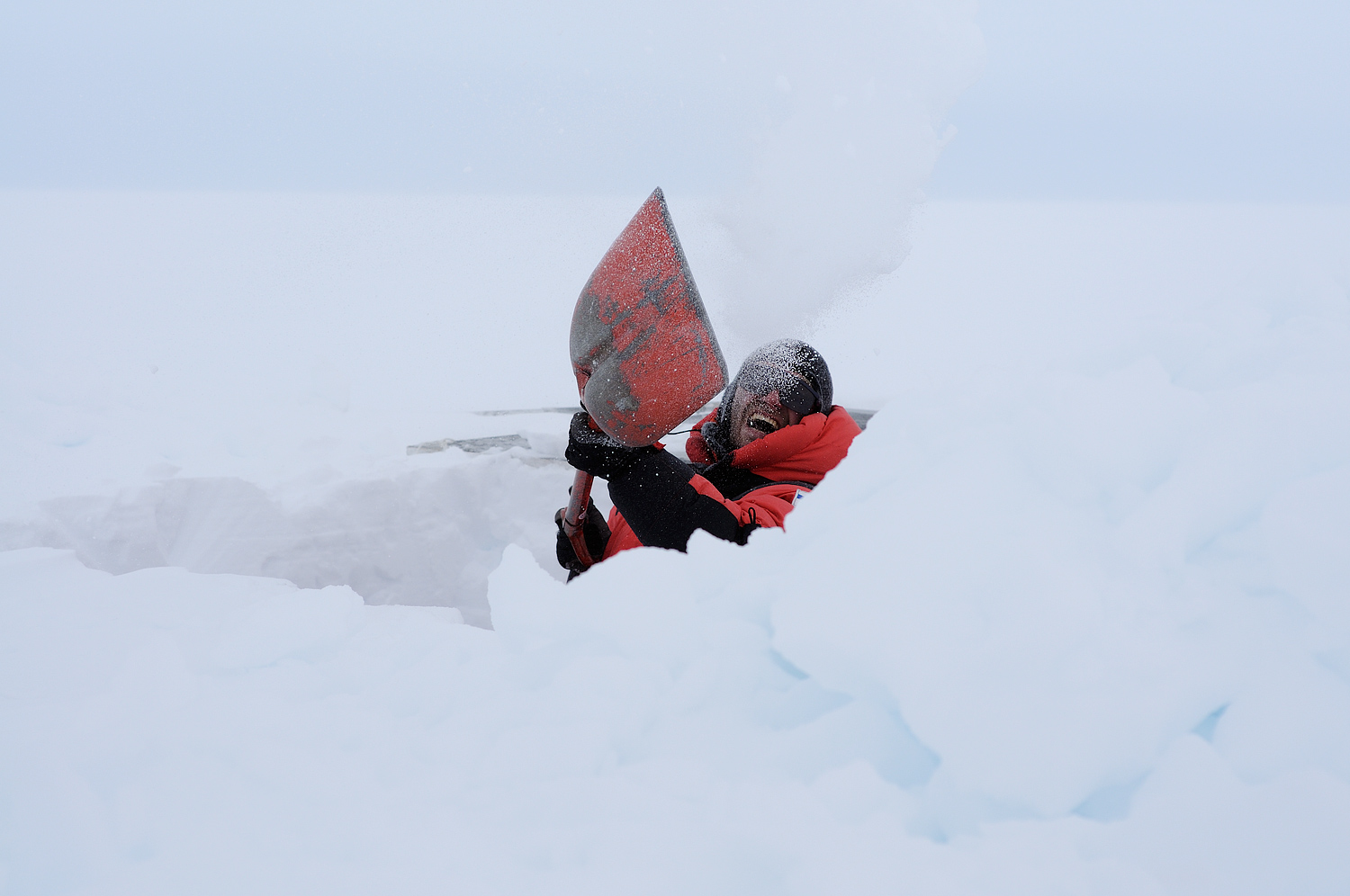
Researcher digging the snow cave at Finnish Aboa station, on Queen Maud Land in Antarctica

A snow cave is constructed by excavating snow so that the tunnel entrance is below the main space to retain warm air. Construction is simplified by building it on a steep slope and digging slightly upwards and horizontally into the slope. The roof is domed to prevent dripping on the occupants. Adequate snow depth, free of rocks and ice, is needed—generally, a depth of 4 to 5 feet (1.2 to 1.5 m) is sufficient. When constructing a snow cave is it common to build it in a large snow drift formed behind a ridge line, as this often offers a large heap of snow, and also protects the entrance of the snow cave from the prevailing wind. It is helpful to start digging a snow cave a bit up in the slope, as this allows easy disposal of the large volume of snow dug out when creating the cave. Another kind of snow cave is the quinzhee, which is constructed of piled and packed snow rather than created by digging a hole out of (or displacing) snow.

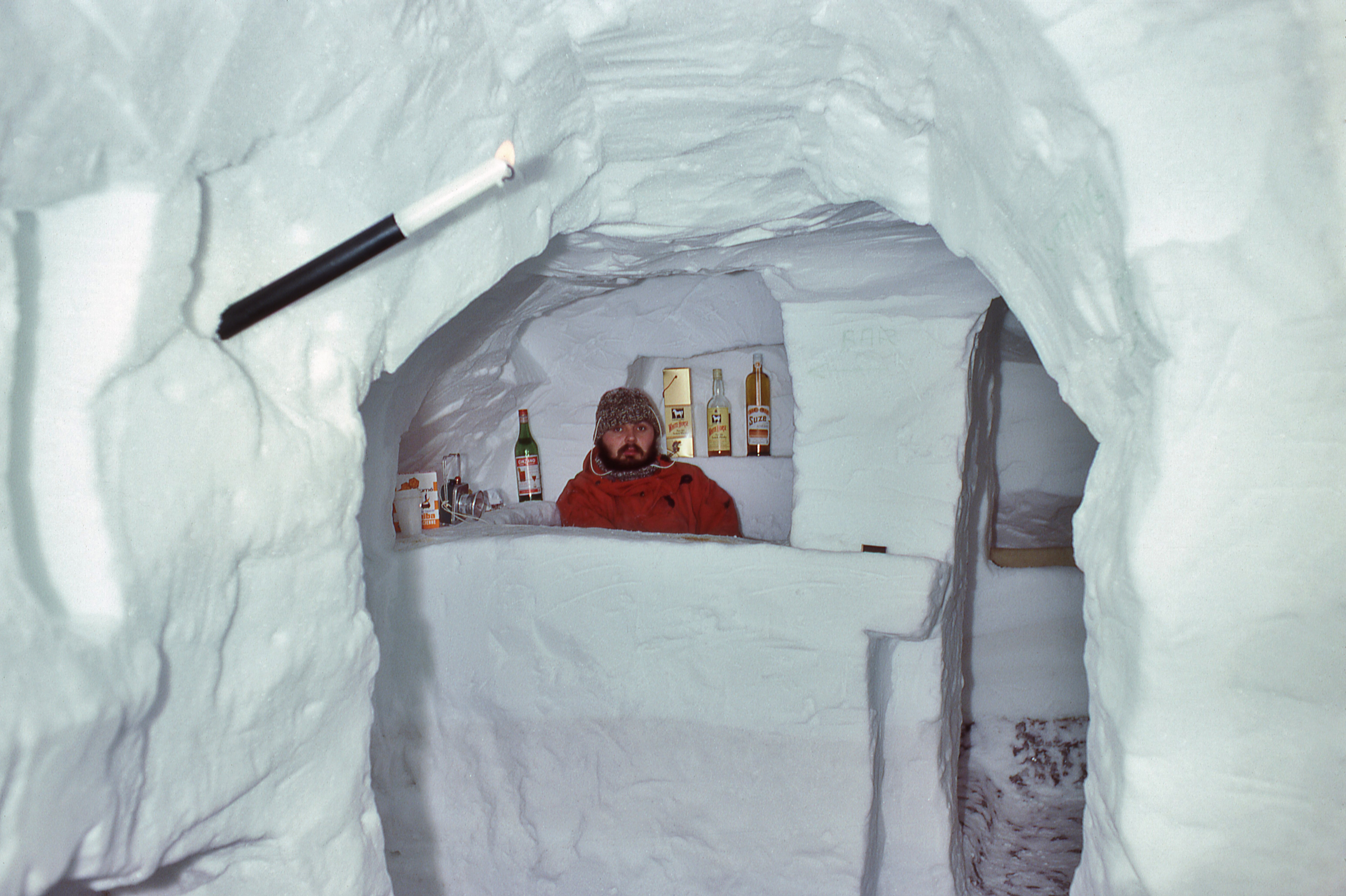
Snow cave excavated in a large snow drift and arranged as a bar in Adélie Land, Antarctica, 1977

A narrow entrance tunnel, a little wider than the occupants of the cave, leads into the main chamber which consists of a flat area, perhaps with elevated sleeping platforms, also excavated from snow. Most sources agree that using tools such as a strong plastic or metal shovel, and maybe ice axe, is vital; digging by hand is for emergencies only. Digging a snow cave can be physically demanding. In perfect conditions with good snow, digging a snow cave for two or three persons often takes three to four hours to complete. It can be useful to take turns in a group of climbers such that each person works in five-minute intervals inside the cave, while the others help remove excess snow outside the cave and prepare food and warm liquids for the group.

Regardless of construction type, the snow must be consolidated so that it retains its structure. The walls and roof should be at least 1 foot (0.30 m) thick. A length-wise pit may be dug deeper into the cave floor to provide a place for the coldest air to gather, away from the occupants. The cave entrance may be closed up with chunks of snow to deflect wind and retain heat, although it is vital to prevent drifting snow from completely plugging the rest of the entrance in order to maintain a constant air supply. Some prefer to place a ski pole or a ski up from the cave out through the roof or side wall. This can provide an emergency air hole should the main entrance become blocked. Skis can also be placed to cover the entrance or used to secure blocks of snow at the entrance. A snow shovel should always be kept inside the cave when participants are inside.

== Dangers ==
It is possible to sleep several consecutive nights in a snow cave, but care must be taken since a slight ice crust may develop on the inside of the cave from moisture in the exhaled air of the inhabitants. This is thought to result in reduced air ventilation through the snow cave walls and roof, and thus increase the risk of suffocation. As a precaution, it is common to scrape off a thin layer from the inside of the cave ceiling each night spent in the cave.

== See also ==
- Maternity den – Lair where the mother gives birth and nurtures the young
- Mountaineering – Activity involving ascending mountains
- Quinzhee – Canadian indigenous snow shelter
- Igloo – Type of shelter built of snow
