= Hudson Plains Ecoregion =

Vast, flat and waterlogged landscape

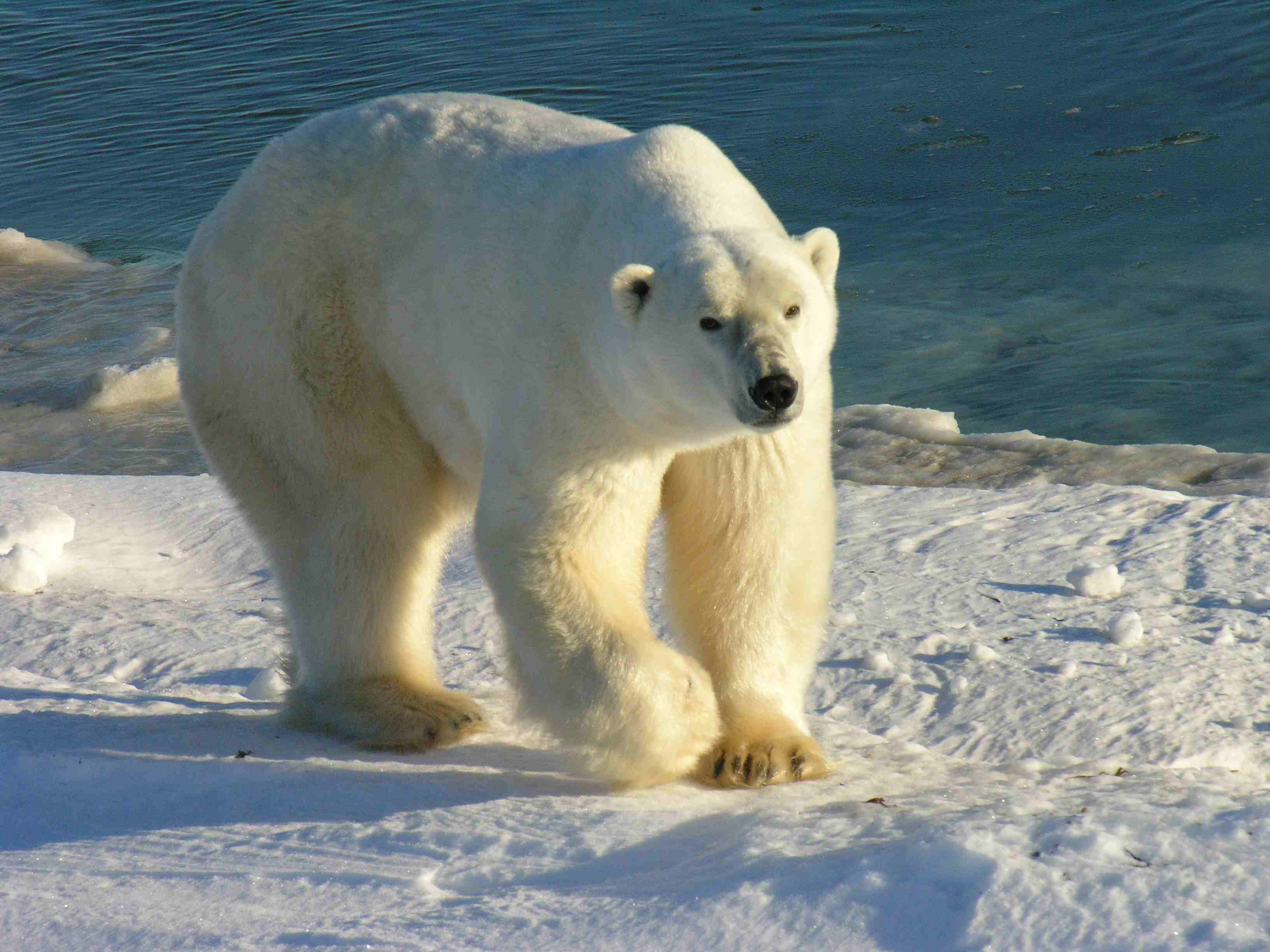
Polar bear (November 2004)

The Hudson Plains Ecoregion is a vast, flat, and waterlogged landscape. This ecoregion covers a 369,000 square kilometer area along the south shoreline of the Hudson Bay, which includes the Canadian provinces of Eastern Quebec, Northern Ontario and Western Manitoba. Because of the location of the ecoregion, winter prevails for many months of the year and rising temperatures, along with melting ice, makes fog common. The short summers provide a home for thousands of migrating birds. The region is used by humans for its mineral resources and hydroelectric power as a result of the abundance of water and emergent societal needs.

Though relatively uninhabited and undisturbed, the natural resources of the Hudson Plains are still subject to anthropogenic activities. Its climatic, geographic, and evolutionary patterns categorize it as one of many ecoregions in North America.

== Geology, topography, and soil type ==
The Hudson Plains Ecoregion soil has Paleozoic and Proterozoic rock with marine silty and clayey sediments on the coastal shore that are young, poorly developed, and saline. The marine soils were deposited by glacial and marine processes. Permafrost extends in continuous stretches in the Northwest to isolated patches in the Southwest.

Glaciation and permafrost in the soil have made drainage slow to non-existent, decreasing rates of decay. In the south, the soil is partially decayed organic material, while in warmer drier locations, the soil is moderately weathered minerals. In other locations, the soil is frozen organic material. During the last ice age, the area was depressed by the weight of the ice and ocean water flooded inland past the current coastline. As the ice retreated, drainage to the Hudson Bay was blocked, creating expansive lakes such as Lakes Agassiz and Ojibway. In winter months, ice packs exist in the Hudson Bay that change the topography until the warmer months arrive, when the ice pack retreats, affecting animals such as polar bears and Arctic foxes that use the ice pack.

Wetlands and peatlands cover the area due to its flat nature. In the region, coastal marshes and wide tidal flats. On the east coast of the Hudson Bay, glacial polishes and striations were formed from the erosion of glacial ice on exposed rock. Sandy strip-like features indicate beach ridges, marking the continuing isostatic rebound of the landscape. Over the landscape, there are alternating depressions, bogs, and fens. The major rivers are the Nelson and Hayes in Manitoba; the Severn, Winisk, Albany, and Abitibi in Ontario; and the Eastmain and La Grande in Quebec.

Traveling west, the landscape becomes boreal forest. Vegetation varies latitudinally, following the poor drainage patterns of the soil. Peat-covered lowlands are waterlogged for prolonged periods, promoting and developing important habitats for waterfowl. Along with waterfowl, the high water concentrations give rise to massive populations of insects. In the rivers, streams, and lakes, fish species such as brook trout and walleye exist. As the summer arrives, the number and variety of wildlife increases greatly.

== Hydrology ==
Ninety percent of this region is covered in wetlands; as high a proportion as is found in the world. The land slopes gradually into Hudson Bay to the north, continuing the process of draining what was once an ocean with relative speed. In some areas, the land rises at about one meter per century. The inland areas are primarily peat bogs and shallow open waters. Along the coast, tidal flats and marshes are broken by raised beaches formed the receding ice sheets. Long, cold winters keep much of this region's water frozen; although increasing temperatures are proving to have effects on both the plains and the bay.

The Hudson Plains greatly influence the bay to the North. During the brief summer months, fresh water ice melt pours into the bay. This warm water causes convection patterns which influence water temperatures throughout the year. Additionally, melting of surface ice on the bay itself also occurs during this time. Not only do these thawing events introduce warm water into the bay; they affect the salinity also. Hudson Bay has a very high portion of freshwater. Researchers are exploring the role of this interplay between hot and cold, as well as fresh and saltwater. Studies have shown that spring thaw of ice sheets on the bay is occurring 5.6 days earlier per decade. This could possibly influence the convection and stratification patterns of water in the bay due to the warm temperature of run-off water and ice melt.

Differences in salinity can also affect these convection patterns. One study showed that run-off water stayed largely in the coastal current; but also reached deeper waters. This happens when there is sufficient brine rejection from ice formation to force run-off into deeper waters.

Some studies suggest the effects of climate change could be quite deleterious to this current balance. As climate change occurs, it continues to increase ice melt on land and sea. Both surface water melt and river discharge are occurring earlier and in greater volume. The result of this may be a decrease in convection currents, further stratifying what is already a very stratified body of water in the late summer. As a result, it has a low production rate, especially in euphotic zones. This stratification can affect temperature and light availability in deeper waters, further decreasing the abundance of primary producers.

== Plant communities ==
The Hudson Plains tundra features extensive areas of low elevation variation where boggy peat, shallow lakes, and slow curving rivers are present. In these areas sedges, cotton grass, and mosses are common. Low black spruce, willows, and grasses occur on the slightly elevated areas. Plant species in the tundra are relatively slow growing, long-lived, perennial organisms devoting minimal resources to sexual reproduction and would be categorized as severe K-strategists. The majority of plant and animal activity occurs in the few months where temperatures are above freezing in the region, so a speedy reproduction cycle has been evolutionarily favored. Due to the relatively low number and activity level of animals in the tundra, most plants do not produce many seeds, and instead send runners or develop bulblets to help ensure reproduction. Some plants have even developed the ability to suspend functions during frost periods and continue development and reproduction once thawed.

South of the tundra lies a transitional zone called the taiga or boreal forest. It is composed mostly of coniferous needle or scale-leafed evergreen trees. It is characterized by moderate to high precipitation and a cold climate where snowpack persists for five to eight months out of the year. Boreal forests exist currently at higher latitudes where the solar angle is 47 to 63.5 degrees, so solar energy is less intense and net primary production on a per hectare basis is relatively low. Black spruce, white spruce, balsam, and poplar trees are common in North American boreal forests. Prominent taiga tree species have become well adapted to extremely cold conditions and long periods of low energy availability. The boreal forest penetrates as close as 30 kilometers from the shoreline of Hudson Bay, with small stands of trees even further north as drainage, soil, and other conditions allow.

== Climate ==
Hudson Plains has short mild summers and long harsh winters. It is considered a continental climate. There is little opportunity to grow food because of the short growing season that is only around 110 days each year and the cold weather. The mean annual temperatures range from -7 degrees Celsius to -2 degrees Celsius. The annual precipitation ranges from around 400-800 mm. The climate here is strongly influenced by the cold Hudson Bay low-pressured and polar high-pressure air masses. The climate depends largely on the water surface during certain parts of the year. In the winter months the bay is covered almost entirely by pack ice and this keeps the air chilled and thus temperatures stay consistently low.

Cold, dry arctic air typically lingers over the area throughout winter. Gusts can sometimes become violent, reaching speeds of up to 130 km/h. The ice begins melting in May and is almost completely gone by the beginning of June. This brings in the rainy season with an abundance of clouds and fog. After a brief and mild summer the temperatures begin to lower again and rain and snow showers become prominent in October and November. The temperature and precipitation correlate closely with latitude. The predominant global pattern that affects the climate is the polar cell. This system cycles the cool polar easterlies with the polar front westerlies and in doing so creates the cold climate but also allows for a moderate amount of precipitation in the region.

== Traditional and emergent resource use ==
The first peoples of Canada, the lowland Cree, have used the natural resources of the Hudson Plains ecoregion as a means of subsistence for generations. Traditional resource use was limited to hunting, trapping, and gathering for the livelihoods of the Cree. In addition, from the 18th to the early 20th century, the regions provisioning resources drew English and French fur traders. Around the turn of the twentieth century, the natural resource focus that was once on trapping and fur trade was replaced by sport fishing, tourism, and a focus on the extractable minerals embedded in the territory.

Climate change as well as ever-changing societal resource demands have prompted the resource use of this area to evolve, or emerge. Emergent resources of the Hudson Plains include rivers for hydroelectric infrastructure, diamond and chromite mineral deposits, and the extensive peatland communities that sequester carbon. One emergent resource, the hydroelectric developments amongst the waterscape, have overall interrupted the flow rates of rivers and other physical dimensions. The impacts of watershed manipulation have the potential to have significant impact on the biota in the region, especially migratory fish species.

Other rising resources are the chromite and diamond mineral deposits found here. Extraction is still being explored for the chromite, however the region's only open-pit mine, The Victor Diamond Mine began production in 2008 and is expected to operate for over a decade. Also notable as an emerging resource are the peatland communities. Eighty-seven percent of the peatland in North America is found within Canada. The Hudson Plains zone hosts the largest peatland complex of the region and sequesters 6.483 trillion tons of carbon, which has very significant environmental and economic value.

== Keystone species ==
Polar bears, caribou, and waterfowl are the three main keystone species that occupy the Hudson Plain ecoregion. Several hundred polar bears that migrate through this area every year to the ice back formation along the coast of the Hudson Bay.

Being in such a desolate area with little or no human interaction, polar bears have little to worry about for human contact, as well a no known natural known predators. With an abundant population of deer and caribou, polar bears seldom go hungry on their migration towards the sea ice in search of their main prey, ring neck seals, and bearded seals. The caribou, which is a species of deer, are also extremely abundant in this region. Caribou primarily feed on lichens, moss, grasses, and birches. Many people consider them to be a keystone species due to the amount of other animals, mostly carnivores that depend on the caribou as a primary food source. With the large population of caribou that life in this area and the lack of human contact or hunting, large amounts of fawns are born each spring.

The most dominant animal species that inhabits the ecoregion is unquestionably waterfowl. Because of the poorly drained and flat surface of the wetlands this allows for ideal nesting habitat in the summer months for thousand of waterfowl. The waterfowl eat mostly grass roots, water plants, and seeds. Canada geese, snow geese, mergansers, scoters and black ducks are the most abundant species of waterfowl in region.

== Endangered species ==
Two endangered species of this ecoregion are the harlequin duck (Histrionicus histrionicus) and the flooded jellyskin (Leptogium rivulare). The harlequin duck is a small diving duck that feeds on bottom life of rivers, ponds and lakes. Males can be seen having a slate blue color all over with a white crest on their head and their sides and flanks are a chestnut color. Females can be seen having a drab brown color, with three distinct white spots on their head. Their breeding zone is the Hudson plains while their wintering zone is the northern Atlantic Ocean coast. Hens mostly nest between May and August, and will lay 5-6 eggs. Ducklings are raised by the hens for roughly 55–60 days until they can fly on their own. At this point the mother abandons them. Shortly after broods are raised, they start to head to their wintering grounds on the ocean. Several problems were thought to be the cause of their population decline. In the late 1980s, they were thought to be overhunted. As a conservation effort, hunting the birds was banned by the early 1990s in Canada and the United States. Also, the birds were thought to be declining because of ingestion of toxic metals. Harlequins feed on the ocean bottom, where some were thought to have ingested lead pellets shot by waterfowl hunters.

Another endangered species is the flooded jellyskin (Leptogium rivulare). It is a native type of lichen that lives on trees on banks and edges of waterways. It has blue-grey lobes with small brown discs on top, which act as its fruiting structures. In the spring it is translucent and looks jelly like, hence the name. As it sucks in water and as the year goes on it takes on its grey and brown colors. They reproduce by producing spores, and they let out their spores in the springtime when there is high water. Their skin is packed with cyanobacteria, a type of blue green bacteria that uses photosynthesis to produce sugars and the jellyskin lives off the sugars produced. The main threat to the flooded jellyskin is that it has a very limited range. Even worse is that one of the tree species that the lichen commonly live on is black ash. Indirectly the lichen is in danger as the emerald ash borer made its way to North America. The black ashes dying off could also lead the flooded jellyskin to do the same.

Also as housing developments are being put in, its waters' edge habitat is diminishing, giving it a smaller range. A conservation effort has been to preserve waterside forests on public land, which is their preferred habitat.

== Environmental issues ==
One environmental problem found in the Hudson Plains is contaminants in the Hudson Bay. Many persistent organic contaminants found within the polar bear community include dieldrin, DDE, and chlordane-related products. Although the effects of these chemicals on the bears is not clear, it is believed to impair endocrine, reproductive, and immune systems. Polar bears are not the only animals suffering from contamination; beluga whales, seals, and benthic animals located in the Hudson Bay also have high levels of contaminants, especially mercury.

Beluga whales also have DDT, PCB's, Chlordane, and toxaphene in their blubber. Mercury was also found within mammal, birds, fish, and even humans located in this area. This is because high levels of mercury can bioaccumulate in the food chain in the flesh of animals, especially in predators. In 5 years, the amount of mercury found in the Cree's bloodstream doubled because of their fish-based diet. Public health recommends humans should only consume fish from here two times a month. Some of the Cree's mercury levels were extremely high and some elders even showed evidence of mercury poisoning.

A second environmental problem in the Hudson Plains is caused from hydroelectric dams. Quebec Hydropower is a large power company that harvests the energy of flowing water by using hydroelectric dams. They pride themselves on developing a clean, renewable energy source; however, the company still has harmful effects on the environment. Flooding in these wetlands occur because of the dams and reservoirs which damages much of the Cree's hunting grounds. In one particular case, the La Grande Reservoir experienced methylmercury contamination due to flooding. These dams have other harmful impacts including riverbank erosion downstream, reversal of natural flow patterns, and interference with fish migration roots.

Sturgeon populations near the hydroelectric dam were diminishing due to loss of breeding grounds in streams. The La Grande Reservoir even transformed from a saltwater estuary to freshwater because of regulated peak flow during the winter. These changes can have a very serious impact on the species that live within this area but there are organizations working towards protecting the Hudson plains.

The Canadian government delegates the task of the environmental protection of this ecoregion to three agencies: the Canadian Wildlife Service of Environment Canada, the Parks Canada Agency, and Fisheries and Oceans Canada. The Canadian Wildlife Service of Environment Canada is tasked with protecting wetlands along the coast which are used by migratory birds. Hydro Quebec adjusted the in-stream flow to protect fish habitats, and installed fish passageways for migration past the dams.

== Effects of climate change ==
Today climate change is the biggest and most important threat to the wetlands. Almost all of the ecoregions wetlands are expected to be severely impacted. Most of the focus is on the impacts caused to many of the ecosystem functions and processes. The ecozone's resilience against climate change and its capacity to continue supplying ecosystem services is unclear.

Global warming’s increase in seasonal temperatures is causing an increase in growing days, decrease in precipitation, and a decrease in annual snow. With the rise in temperatures, the evaporation from the wetlands is anticipated to increase, along with the thawing of permafrost, creating the depth of active layer to increase effecting hydrology, geomorphic processes, and vegetation cover. With the thawing permafrost, in the northerly areas, they are expecting to see a collapse in peatlands, which will raise the water table, and form ponds.

It is unclear how well the ecozone’s massive expanse of peatlands will be able to continue successfully storing carbon. If the carbon stored in the peatlands releases into the atmosphere it could exacerbate global warming further. These potential changes in the balance of carbon pose a threat to both biodiversity and human well-being.
