= List of airports by ICAO code: C =

List of airports by ICAO code: A - B - C - D - EB-EG - EH-EY - FA-FM - FN-FZ - G - H - ~~I~~ - J - KA-KH - KI-KP - KR-KZ - LA-LJ - LK-LZ - M - N - O - P - Q - R - SA-SC - SD-SH - SI - SJ - SK-SM - SN-SP - SQ - SS-SU - SV-SY - T - U - V - W - ~~X~~ - YA-YG - YH-YQ - YR-YZ - Z

The prefix C is reserved for Canada. The only ICAO codes that Nav Canada has assigned start with CY or CZ. In many, but not all, cases, the ICAO code is simply the IATA code for the airport prefixed with C.

Airport names in italics are part of the National Airports System.

== CY ==
Also see airport category and list.

ICAO	IATA	Airport name	Community	Province or territory	Coordinates
CYAB	YAB	Arctic Bay Airport	Arctic Bay	Nunavut	73°00′23″N 085°02′50″W
CYAC	YAC	Cat Lake Airport	Cat Lake First Nation	Ontario	51°43′38″N 091°49′28″W
CYAD		La Grande-3 Airport	La Grande-3 generating station	Quebec	53°34′19″N 076°11′47″W
CYAG	YAG	Fort Frances Municipal Airport	Fort Frances	Ontario	48°39′15″N 093°26′23″W
CYAH	YAH	La Grande-4 Airport	La Grande-4 generating station	Quebec	53°45′17″N 073°40′31″W
CYAL	YAL	Alert Bay Airport	Alert Bay	British Columbia	50°34′56″N 126°54′57″W
CYAM	YAM	Sault Ste. Marie Airport	Sault Ste. Marie	Ontario	46°29′07″N 084°30′34″W
CYAQ	XKS	Kasabonika Airport	Kasabonika Lake First Nation	Ontario	53°31′29″N 088°38′35″W
CYAS	YKG	Kangirsuk Airport	Kangirsuk	Quebec	60°01′38″N 069°59′57″W
CYAT	YAT	Attawapiskat Airport	Attawapiskat First Nation	Ontario	52°55′39″N 082°25′55″W
CYAU		South Shore Regional Airport	Liverpool	Nova Scotia	44°13′50″N 064°51′22″W
CYAV		Winnipeg/St. Andrews Airport (St. Andrews Airport)	St. Andrews	Manitoba	50°03′23″N 097°01′57″W
CYAW	YAW	Shearwater Heliport (CFB Shearwater, Halifax/Shearwater Heliport)	Shearwater	Nova Scotia	44°38′14″N 063°30′08″W
CYAX		Lac du Bonnet Airport	Lac du Bonnet	Manitoba	50°17′40″N 096°00′36″W
CYAY	YAY	St. Anthony Airport	St. Anthony	Newfoundland and Labrador	51°23′31″N 056°04′59″W
CYAZ		Tofino-Long Beach Airport	Tofino	British Columbia	49°04′55″N 125°46′21″W
CYBA		Banff Airport	Banff	Alberta	51°12′28″N 115°32′27″W
CYBB	YBB	Kugaaruk Airport	Kugaaruk	Nunavut	68°32′09″N 089°48′19″W
CYBC	YBC	Baie-Comeau Airport	Baie-Comeau	Quebec	49°07′57″N 068°12′16″W
CYBD	QBC	Bella Coola Airport	Bella Coola	British Columbia	52°23′15″N 126°35′45″W
CYBE	YBE	Uranium City Airport	Uranium City	Saskatchewan	59°33′41″N 108°28′53″W
CYBF		Bonnyville Aerodrome	Bonnyville	Alberta	54°18′17″N 110°44′28″W
CYBG	YBG	CFB Bagotville (Bagotville Airport)	La Baie	Quebec	48°19′50″N 070°59′49″W
CYBK	YBK	Baker Lake Airport	Baker Lake	Nunavut	64°17′56″N 096°04′40″W
CYBL	YBL	Campbell River Airport	Campbell River	British Columbia	49°57′07″N 125°16′23″W
CYBN	YBN	Borden Heliport (CFB Borden)	CFB Borden	Ontario	44°16′18″N 079°54′45″W
CYBP		Brooks Regional Aerodrome	Brooks	Alberta	50°38′01″N 111°55′33″W
CYBQ	XTL	Tadoule Lake Airport	Tadoule Lake	Manitoba	58°42′22″N 098°30′44″W
CYBR	YBR	Brandon Municipal Airport (McGill Field)	Brandon	Manitoba	49°54′36″N 099°57′07″W
CYBT	YBT	Brochet Airport	Brochet	Manitoba	57°53′22″N 101°40′45″W
CYBU	YBU	Nipawin Airport	Nipawin	Saskatchewan	53°19′58″N 104°00′32″W
CYBV	YBV	Berens River Airport	Berens River	Manitoba	52°21′32″N 097°01′06″W
CYBW	YBW	Calgary/Springbank Airport (Springbank Airport)	Calgary	Alberta	51°06′11″N 114°22′28″W
CYBX	YBX	Lourdes-de-Blanc-Sablon Airport	Blanc-Sablon	Quebec	51°26′37″N 057°11′07″W
CYCA	YRF	Cartwright Airport	Cartwright	Newfoundland and Labrador	53°40′58″N 057°02′31″W
CYCB	YCB	Cambridge Bay Airport	Cambridge Bay	Nunavut	69°06′29″N 105°08′14″W
CYCC	YCC	Cornwall Regional Airport	Cornwall	Ontario	45°05′34″N 074°34′04″W
CYCD	YCD	Nanaimo Airport	Nanaimo	British Columbia	49°03′08″N 123°52′13″W
CYCE	YCE	Centralia/James T. Field Memorial Aerodrome (RCAF Station Centralia)	Centralia	Ontario	43°17′08″N 081°30′30″W
CYCG	YCG	West Kootenay Regional Airport (Castlegar Airport)	Castlegar	British Columbia	49°17′47″N 117°37′57″W
CYCH	YCH	Miramichi Airport	Miramichi	New Brunswick	47°00′21″N 065°27′25″W
CYCK	XCM	Chatham-Kent Airport	Chatham-Kent	Ontario	42°18′23″N 082°04′55″W
CYCL	YCL	Charlo Airport	Charlo	New Brunswick	47°59′27″N 066°19′49″W
CYCN	YCN	Cochrane Aerodrome	Cochrane	Ontario	49°06′20″N 081°00′49″W
CYCO	YCO	Kugluktuk Airport	Kugluktuk	Nunavut	67°49′00″N 115°08′38″W
CYCP	YCP	Blue River Airport	Blue River	British Columbia	52°07′27″N 119°17′33″W
CYCQ	YCQ	Chetwynd Airport	Chetwynd	British Columbia	55°41′14″N 121°37′36″W
CYCR	YCR	Cross Lake (Charlie Sinclair Memorial) Airport	Cross Lake	Manitoba	54°36′39″N 097°45′37″W
CYCS	YCS	Chesterfield Inlet Airport	Chesterfield Inlet	Nunavut	63°20′50″N 090°43′52″W
CYCT		Coronation Airport	Coronation	Alberta	52°04′30″N 111°26′43″W
CYCW	YCW	Chilliwack Airport	Chilliwack	British Columbia	49°09′12″N 121°56′21″W
CYCX	YCX	CFB Gagetown	Oromocto	New Brunswick	45°50′16″N 066°26′12″W
CYCY	YCY	Clyde River Airport	Clyde River	Nunavut	70°29′09″N 068°31′01″W
CYCZ	YCZ	Fairmont Hot Springs Airport	Fairmont Hot Springs	British Columbia	50°19′49″N 115°52′24″W
CYDA	YDA	Dawson City Airport	Dawson City	Yukon	64°02′32″N 139°07′48″W
CYDB	YDB	Burwash Airport	Burwash Landing	Yukon	61°22′14″N 139°02′24″W
CYDC		Princeton Aerodrome	Princeton	British Columbia	49°28′05″N 120°30′41″W
CYDF	YDF	Deer Lake Regional Airport	Deer Lake	Newfoundland and Labrador	49°12′40″N 057°23′29″W
CYDH		Ottawa/Dwyer Hill Heliport	Ottawa	Ontario	45°07′50″N 075°56′54″W
CYDL	YDL	Dease Lake Airport	Dease Lake	British Columbia	58°25′20″N 130°01′56″W
CYDM	XRR	Ross River Airport	Ross River	Yukon	61°58′14″N 132°25′20″W
CYDN	YDN	Lt. Col W.G. (Billy) Barker VC Airport (RCAF Station Dauphin)	Dauphin	Manitoba	51°06′03″N 100°03′09″W
CYDO	YDO	Lac-Saint-Jean Aerodrome	Saint-Félicien	Quebec	48°46′43″N 072°22′30″W
CYDP	YDP	Nain Airport	Nain	Newfoundland and Labrador	56°33′02″N 061°40′56″W
CYDQ	YDQ	Dawson Creek Airport	Dawson Creek	British Columbia	55°44′32″N 120°10′59″W
CYEA		Empress Airport	Empress	Alberta	50°56′01″N 110°00′49″W
CYED	YED	CFB Edmonton (Edmonton/Namao Heliport)	Edmonton	Alberta	53°40′09″N 113°28′32″W
CYEE	YEE	Midland/Huronia Airport	Midland	Ontario	44°41′05″N 079°55′46″W
CYEG	YEG	Edmonton International Airport (Note: All 23 provincial airports that are part of the NAS are owned by Transport Canada and operated by an airports authority, with both Montreal airports being run by Aéroports de Montréal. The exception is Kelowna International Airport which is operated by the city)	Nisku	Alberta	53°18′35″N 113°34′47″W
CYEK	YEK	Arviat Airport	Arviat	Nunavut	61°05′38″N 094°04′18″W
CYEL	YEL	Elliot Lake Municipal Airport	Elliot Lake	Ontario	46°21′05″N 082°33′41″W
CYEM	YEM	Manitowaning/Manitoulin East Municipal Airport	Manitowaning	Ontario	45°50′33″N 081°51′27″W
CYEN	YEN	Estevan Regional Aerodrome	Estevan	Saskatchewan	49°12′37″N 102°57′57″W
CYEP		Edmonton Parkland Executive Airport	Parkland County	Alberta	53°28′27″N 113°49′27″W
CYER	YER	Fort Severn Airport	Fort Severn First Nation	Ontario	56°01′08″N 087°40′34″W
CYES		Edmundston Airport	Edmundston	New Brunswick	47°29′24″N 068°28′54″W
CYET	YET	Edson Airport	Edson	Alberta	53°34′44″N 116°27′54″W
CYEU	YEU	Eureka Aerodrome	Eureka	Nunavut	79°59′40″N 085°48′43″W
CYEV	YEV	Inuvik (Mike Zubko) Airport	Inuvik	Northwest Territories	68°18′14″N 133°28′59″W
CYEY	YEY	Amos/Magny Airport	Amos	Quebec	48°33′54″N 078°14′57″W
CYFA	YFA	Fort Albany Airport	Fort Albany First Nation	Ontario	52°12′05″N 081°41′49″W
CYFB	YFB	Iqaluit Airport (Note: The three territorial airports serving the capital cites are owned and operated by the Government of Nunavut, Government of the Northwest Territories, and Government of Yukon)	Iqaluit	Nunavut	63°45′23″N 068°33′21″W
CYFC	YFC	Fredericton International Airport (Greater Fredericton International Airport)	Fredericton	New Brunswick	45°52′08″N 066°32′14″W
CYFD	YFD	Brantford Airport	Brantford	Ontario	43°07′53″N 080°20′33″W
CYFE	YFE	Forestville Airport	Forestville	Quebec	48°44′46″N 069°05′50″W
CYFH	YFH	Fort Hope Airport	Eabametoong First Nation	Ontario	51°33′43″N 087°54′28″W
CYFI	YFI	Fort MacKay/Firebag Aerodrome	Fort McKay	Alberta	57°16′33″N 110°58′36″W
CYFJ		Mont-Tremblant International Airport (La Macaza/Mont Tremblant International Airport)	Mont-Tremblant	Quebec	46°24′34″N 074°46′48″W
CYFO	YFO	Flin Flon Airport	Flin Flon	Manitoba	54°40′41″N 101°40′54″W
CYFR	YFR	Fort Resolution Airport	Fort Resolution	Northwest Territories	61°10′51″N 113°41′23″W
CYFS	YFS	Fort Simpson Airport	Fort Simpson	Northwest Territories	61°45′37″N 121°14′11″W
CYFT	YMN	Makkovik Airport	Makkovik	Newfoundland and Labrador	55°04′38″N 059°11′15″W
CYGB		Texada/Gillies Bay Airport	Texada Island	British Columbia	49°41′39″N 124°31′04″W
CYGD	YGD	Goderich Airport	Goderich	Ontario	43°46′01″N 081°42′38″W
CYGE	YGE	Golden Airport	Golden	British Columbia	51°17′57″N 116°58′57″W
CYGH	YGH	Fort Good Hope Airport	Fort Good Hope	Northwest Territories	66°14′27″N 128°39′03″W
CYGK	YGK	Kingston Norman Rogers Airport	Kingston	Ontario	44°13′35″N 076°35′04″W
CYGL	YGL	La Grande Rivière Airport	Radisson	Quebec	53°37′31″N 077°42′15″W
CYGM	YGM	Gimli Industrial Park Airport	Gimli	Manitoba	50°37′41″N 097°02′36″W
CYGO	YGO	Gods Lake Narrows Airport	Gods Lake Narrows	Manitoba	54°33′30″N 094°29′27″W
CYGP	YGP	Michel-Pouliot Gaspé Airport (Gaspé (Michel-Pouliot) Airport)	Gaspé	Quebec	48°46′30″N 064°28′54″W
CYGQ	YGQ	Geraldton (Greenstone Regional) Airport	Geraldton	Ontario	49°46′42″N 086°56′22″W
CYGR	YGR	Îles-de-la-Madeleine Airport	Magdalen Islands	Quebec	47°25′29″N 061°46′41″W
CYGT	YGT	Igloolik Airport	Igloolik	Nunavut	69°21′53″N 081°48′58″W
CYGV	YGV	Havre Saint-Pierre Airport	Havre-Saint-Pierre	Quebec	50°16′55″N 063°36′41″W
CYGW	YGW	Kuujjuarapik Airport	Kuujjuarapik	Quebec	55°16′55″N 077°45′55″W
CYGX	YGX	Gillam Airport	Gillam	Manitoba	56°21′27″N 094°42′38″W
CYGZ	YGZ	Grise Fiord Airport	Grise Fiord	Nunavut	76°25′33″N 082°54′29″W
CYHA	YQC	Quaqtaq Airport	Quaqtaq	Quebec	61°02′47″N 069°37′04″W
CYHB	YHB	Hudson Bay Airport	Hudson Bay	Saskatchewan	52°49′00″N 102°18′41″W
CYHC	CXH	Vancouver Harbour Flight Centre (Vancouver Harbour Water Airport, Vancouver Coal Harbour Seaplane Base)	Vancouver	British Columbia	49°17′40″N 123°06′41″W
CYHD	YHD	Dryden Regional Airport	Dryden	Ontario	49°49′53″N 092°44′37″W
CYHE	YHE	Hope Aerodrome	Hope	British Columbia	49°22′06″N 121°29′53″W
CYHF	YHF	Hearst (René Fontaine) Municipal Airport	Hearst	Ontario	49°42′50″N 083°41′13″W
CYHH	YNS	Nemiscau Airport	Nemaska	Quebec	51°41′28″N 076°08′08″W
CYHI	YHI	Ulukhaktok Airport	Ulukhaktok	Northwest Territories	70°45′46″N 117°48′22″W
CYHK	YHK	Gjoa Haven Airport	Gjoa Haven	Nunavut	68°38′08″N 095°51′01″W
CYHM	YHM	John C. Munro Hamilton International Airport (Hamilton/John C. Munro International Airport)	Hamilton	Ontario	43°10′25″N 079°56′06″W
CYHN	YHN	Hornepayne Municipal Airport	Hornepayne	Ontario	49°11′35″N 084°45′32″W
CYHO	YHO	Hopedale Airport	Hopedale	Newfoundland and Labrador	55°26′54″N 060°13′43″W
CYHR	YHR	Chevery Airport	Chevery	Quebec	50°28′08″N 059°38′12″W
CYHS		Saugeen Municipal Airport	Hanover	Ontario	44°09′30″N 081°03′46″W
CYHT	YHT	Haines Junction Airport	Haines Junction	Yukon	60°47′21″N 137°32′44″W
CYHU	YHU	Montreal Metropolitan Airport (Montréal/MET (Aéroport métropolitain de Montréal) Airport, Montréal/Saint-Hubert Airport)	Longueuil	Quebec	45°31′03″N 073°25′01″W
CYHY	YHY	Hay River/Merlyn Carter Airport	Hay River	Northwest Territories	60°50′23″N 115°46′58″W
CYHZ	YHZ	Halifax Stanfield International Airport	Halifax	Nova Scotia	44°52′47″N 063°30′37″W
CYIB	YIB	Atikokan Municipal Aerodrome	Atikokan	Ontario	48°46′27″N 091°38′20″W
CYID	YDG	Digby Municipal Airport	Digby	Nova Scotia	44°32′44″N 065°47′20″W
CYIF	YIF	Saint-Augustin Airport	Saint-Augustin	Quebec	51°12′36″N 058°39′27″W
CYIK	YIK	Ivujivik Airport	Ivujivik	Quebec	62°25′02″N 077°53′31″W
CYIO	YIO	Pond Inlet Airport	Pond Inlet	Nunavut	72°41′22″N 077°58′08″W
CYIV	YIV	Island Lake Airport	Island Lake	Manitoba	53°51′26″N 094°39′13″W
CYJA		Jasper Airport	Jasper	Alberta	52°59′48″N 118°03′34″W
CYJF	YJF	Fort Liard Airport	Fort Liard	Northwest Territories	60°14′08″N 123°28′12″W
CYJM		Fort St. James (Perison) Airport	Fort St. James	British Columbia	54°23′50″N 124°15′46″W
CYJN	YJN	Saint-Jean Airport (Saint-Jean-sur-Richelieu Airport)	Saint-Jean-sur-Richelieu	Quebec	45°17′40″N 073°16′52″W
CYJP		Fort Providence Airport	Fort Providence	Northwest Territories	61°19′09″N 117°36′22″W
CYJQ		Denny Island Aerodrome	Denny Island	British Columbia	52°08′23″N 128°03′49″W
CYJT	YJT	Stephenville International Airport	Stephenville	Newfoundland and Labrador	48°32′29″N 058°33′00″W
CYKA	YKA	Kamloops Airport	Kamloops	British Columbia	50°42′09″N 120°26′55″W
CYKC		Collins Bay Airport	Collins Bay	Saskatchewan	58°14′10″N 103°40′40″W
CYKD	LAK	Aklavik/Freddie Carmichael Airport	Aklavik	Northwest Territories	68°13′24″N 135°00′21″W
CYKF	YKF	Region of Waterloo International Airport (Kitchener/Waterloo Regional Airport)	Regional Municipality of Waterloo	Ontario	43°27′32″N 080°22′39″W
CYKG	YWB	Kangiqsujuaq (Wakeham Bay) Airport	Kangiqsujuaq	Quebec	61°35′19″N 071°55′46″W
CYKJ	YKJ	Key Lake Airport	Key Lake	Saskatchewan	57°15′23″N 105°37′03″W
CYKL	YKL	Schefferville Airport	Schefferville	Quebec	54°48′19″N 066°48′19″W
CYKM	YKD	Kincardine Municipal Airport	Kincardine	Ontario	44°12′05″N 081°36′24″W
CYKO	AKV	Akulivik Airport	Akulivik	Quebec	60°49′07″N 078°08′55″W
CYKP	YOG	Ogoki Post Airport	Marten Falls First Nation	Ontario	51°39′31″N 085°54′06″W
CYKQ	YKQ	Waskaganish Airport	Waskaganish	Quebec	51°28′24″N 078°45′30″W
CYKX	YKX	Kirkland Lake Airport	Kirkland Lake	Ontario	48°12′37″N 079°58′53″W
CYKY	YKY	Kindersley Regional Airport	Kindersley	Saskatchewan	51°30′55″N 109°10′50″W
CYLA	YPJ	Aupaluk Airport	Aupaluk	Quebec	59°17′48″N 069°35′59″W
CYLB		Lac La Biche Airport	Lac La Biche	Alberta	54°46′13″N 112°01′54″W
CYLC	YLC	Kimmirut Airport	Kimmirut	Nunavut	62°51′00″N 069°53′00″W
CYLD	YLD	Chapleau Airport	Chapleau	Ontario	47°49′12″N 083°20′48″W
CYLH	YLH	Lansdowne House Airport	Neskantaga First Nation	Ontario	52°11′44″N 087°56′03″W
CYLI		Lillooet Airport	Lillooet	British Columbia	50°40′29″N 121°53′37″W
CYLJ	YLJ	Meadow Lake Airport	Meadow Lake	Saskatchewan	54°07′31″N 108°31′22″W
CYLK	YSG	Lutselk'e Airport	Łutselk'e	Northwest Territories	62°25′06″N 110°40′56″W
CYLL	YLL	Lloydminster Airport	Lloydminster	Alberta	53°18′33″N 110°04′21″W
CYLQ	YLQ	La Tuque Airport	La Tuque	Quebec	47°24′33″N 072°47′21″W
CYLR	YLR	Leaf Rapids Airport	Leaf Rapids	Manitoba	56°30′48″N 099°59′07″W
CYLS	YLK	Lake Simcoe Regional Airport (Barrie-Orillia (Lake Simcoe Regional) Airport)	Barrie	Ontario	44°29′07″N 079°33′20″W
CYLT	YLT	Alert Airport	Alert	Nunavut	82°31′02″N 062°17′04″W
CYLU	XGR	Kangiqsualujjuaq (Georges River) Airport	Kangiqsualujjuaq	Quebec	58°42′41″N 065°59′34″W
CYLW	YLW	Kelowna International Airport	Kelowna	British Columbia	49°57′22″N 119°22′40″W
CYMA	YMA	Mayo Airport	Mayo	Yukon	63°36′59″N 135°52′06″W
CYME	YME	Matane/Russell-Burnett Airport	Matane	Quebec	48°51′25″N 067°27′12″W
CYMG	YMG	Manitouwadge Airport	Manitouwadge	Ontario	49°05′02″N 085°51′38″W
CYMH	YMH	Mary's Harbour Airport	Mary's Harbour	Newfoundland and Labrador	52°18′10″N 055°50′52″W
CYMJ	YMJ	CFB Moose Jaw	Moose Jaw	Saskatchewan	50°19′49″N 105°33′33″W
CYML	YML	Charlevoix Airport	Charlevoix	Quebec	47°35′51″N 070°13′26″W
CYMM	YMM	Fort McMurray International Airport	Fort McMurray	Alberta	56°39′12″N 111°13′24″W
CYMO	YMO	Moosonee Airport	Moosonee	Ontario	51°17′28″N 080°36′28″W
CYMT	YMT	Chibougamau/Chapais Airport	Chibougamau	Quebec	49°46′19″N 074°31′41″W
CYMU	YUD	Umiujaq Airport	Umiujaq	Quebec	56°32′10″N 076°31′06″W
CYMW	YMW	Maniwaki Airport	Maniwaki	Quebec	46°16′22″N 075°59′26″W
CYMX	YMX	Montréal–Mirabel International Airport	Montreal	Quebec	45°40′47″N 074°02′19″W
CYNA	YNA	Natashquan Airport	Natashquan	Quebec	50°11′24″N 061°47′20″W
CYNC	YNC	Wemindji Airport	Wemindji	Quebec	53°00′38″N 078°49′52″W
CYND	YND	Gatineau-Ottawa Executive Airport (Ottawa/Gatineau Airport)	Gatineau	Quebec	45°31′17″N 075°33′51″W
CYNE	YNE	Norway House Airport	Norway House	Manitoba	53°57′30″N 097°50′39″W
CYNH	YNH	Hudson's Hope Airport	Hudson's Hope	British Columbia	56°02′08″N 121°58′33″W
CYNJ	YNJ	Langley Regional Airport	Langley	British Columbia	49°06′11″N 122°37′36″W
CYNL	YNL	Points North Landing Airport	Points North Landing	Saskatchewan	58°16′36″N 104°04′57″W
CYNM	YNM	Matagami Airport	Matagami	Quebec	49°45′42″N 077°48′10″W
CYNN		Nejanilini Lake Airport	Nejanilini Lake	Manitoba	59°29′07″N 097°46′52″W
CYNR		Fort MacKay/Horizon Airport	Fort McKay	Alberta	57°22′54″N 111°42′04″W
CYOA	YOA	Ekati Airport	Ekati Diamond Mine	Northwest Territories	64°41′56″N 110°36′53″W
CYOC	YOC	Old Crow Airport	Old Crow	Yukon	67°34′14″N 139°50′21″W
CYOD	YOD	CFB Cold Lake (Cold Lake/Group Captain R.W. McNair Airport)	Cold Lake	Alberta	54°24′19″N 110°16′56″W
CYOH	YOH	Oxford House Airport	Oxford House	Manitoba	54°56′00″N 095°16′44″W
CYOJ	YOJ	High Level Airport	High Level	Alberta	58°37′17″N 117°09′53″W
CYOO	YOO	Oshawa Executive Airport (Toronto/Oshawa Executive Airport)	Oshawa	Ontario	43°55′22″N 078°53′42″W
CYOP		Rainbow Lake Airport	Rainbow Lake	Alberta	58°29′28″N 119°24′24″W
CYOS	YOS	Meaford Airport (Major-General Richard Rohmer Meaford International Airport; Meaford/Major-General Richard Rohmer Airport)	Meaford	Ontario	44°35′25″N 080°50′15″W
CYOW	YOW	Ottawa Macdonald–Cartier International Airport (Macdonald-Cartier International Airport)	Ottawa	Ontario	45°19′21″N 075°40′09″W
CYOY	YOY	CFB Valcartier (Valcartier (W/C J.H.L. (Joe) Lecomte) Heliport)	Saint-Gabriel-de-Valcartier	Quebec	48°54′10″N 071°30′13″W
CYPA	YPA	Prince Albert (Glass Field) Airport	Prince Albert	Saskatchewan	53°12′51″N 105°40′22″W
CYPC	YPC	Paulatuk (Nora Aliqatchialuk Ruben) Airport	Paulatuk	Northwest Territories	69°21′38″N 124°04′33″W
CYPD	YPS	Allan J. MacEachen Port Hawkesbury Airport (Port Hawkesbury Airport)	Port Hawkesbury	Nova Scotia	45°39′24″N 061°22′05″W
CYPE	YPE	Peace River Airport	Peace River	Alberta	56°13′37″N 117°26′50″W
CYPG	YPG	Portage la Prairie/Southport Airport	Portage la Prairie	Manitoba	49°54′11″N 098°16′26″W
CYPH	YPH	Inukjuak Airport	Inukjuak	Quebec	58°28′19″N 078°04′37″W
CYPK	YPK	Pitt Meadows Regional Airport	Pitt Meadows	British Columbia	49°12′58″N 122°42′48″W
CYPL	YPL	Pickle Lake Airport	Pickle Lake	Ontario	51°26′47″N 090°12′49″W
CYPM	YPM	Pikangikum Airport	Pikangikum First Nation	Ontario	51°49′11″N 093°58′24″W
CYPN	YPN	Port-Menier Airport	Port-Menier	Quebec	49°50′11″N 064°17′19″W
CYPO	YPO	Peawanuck Airport	Peawanuck	Ontario	54°59′17″N 085°26′36″W
CYPP		Parent Airport	Parent	Quebec	47°55′55″N 074°36′29″W
CYPQ	YPQ	Peterborough Regional Airport	Peterborough	Ontario	44°13′50″N 078°21′47″W
CYPR	YPR	Prince Rupert Airport	Prince Rupert	British Columbia	54°17′10″N 130°26′41″W
CYPS		Pemberton Regional Airport	Pemberton	British Columbia	50°18′09″N 122°44′16″W
CYPT		Pelee Island Airport	Pelee	Ontario	41°46′42″N 082°40′41″W
CYPU	YPU	Puntzi Mountain Airport	Puntzi Mountain	British Columbia	52°06′46″N 124°08′41″W
CYPW	YPW	Powell River Airport	Powell River	British Columbia	49°50′03″N 124°30′01″W
CYPX		Puvirnituq Airport	Puvirnituq	Quebec	60°03′02″N 077°17′13″W
CYPY	YPY	Fort Chipewyan Airport	Fort Chipewyan	Alberta	58°46′02″N 111°07′02″W
CYPZ	YPZ	Burns Lake Airport	Burns Lake	British Columbia	54°22′35″N 125°57′05″W
CYQA	YQA	Muskoka Airport	Muskoka	Ontario	44°58′35″N 079°18′24″W
CYQB	YQB	Québec City Jean Lesage International Airport	Quebec City	Quebec	46°47′28″N 071°23′36″W
CYQD	YQD	The Pas Airport	The Pas	Manitoba	53°58′17″N 101°05′28″W
CYQF	YQF	Red Deer Regional Airport	Red Deer	Alberta	52°11′06″N 113°53′34″W
CYQG	YQG	Windsor International Airport	Windsor	Ontario	42°16′32″N 082°57′19″W
CYQH	YQH	Watson Lake Airport	Watson Lake	Yukon	60°06′59″N 128°49′21″W
CYQI	YQI	Yarmouth Airport	Yarmouth	Nova Scotia	43°49′38″N 066°05′18″W
CYQK	YQK	Kenora Airport	Kenora	Ontario	49°47′18″N 094°21′47″W
CYQL	YQL	Lethbridge Airport	Lethbridge	Alberta	49°37′49″N 112°47′59″W
CYQM	YQM	Greater Moncton Roméo LeBlanc International Airport (Moncton/Greater Moncton Roméo LeBlanc International Airport)	Moncton	New Brunswick	46°06′44″N 064°40′43″W
CYQN	YQN	Nakina Airport	Nakina	Ontario	50°10′58″N 086°41′47″W
CYQQ	YQQ	CFB Comox (Comox Airport)	Comox	British Columbia	49°42′39″N 124°53′12″W
CYQR	YQR	Regina International Airport	Regina	Saskatchewan	50°25′55″N 104°39′57″W
CYQS	YQS	St. Thomas Municipal Airport	St. Thomas	Ontario	42°46′12″N 081°06′39″W
CYQT	YQT	Thunder Bay Airport	Thunder Bay	Ontario	48°22′19″N 089°19′26″W
CYQU	YQU	Grande Prairie Airport	Grande Prairie	Alberta	55°10′55″N 118°53′14″W
CYQV	YQV	Yorkton Regional Airport (RCAF Station Yorkton)	Yorkton	Saskatchewan	51°15′53″N 102°27′42″W
CYQW	YQW	North Battleford Airport	North Battleford	Saskatchewan	52°46′09″N 108°14′37″W
CYQX	YQX	Gander International Airport	Gander	Newfoundland and Labrador	48°56′13″N 054°34′05″W
CYQY	YQY	JA Douglas McCurdy Sydney Airport	Sydney	Nova Scotia	46°09′41″N 060°02′53″W
CYQZ	YQZ	Quesnel Airport	Quesnel	British Columbia	53°01′34″N 122°30′37″W
CYRA	YRA	Gamètì/Rae Lakes Airport	Gamèti	Northwest Territories	64°06′58″N 117°18′35″W
CYRB	YRB	Resolute Bay Airport	Resolute	Nunavut	74°43′01″N 094°58′10″W
CYRC		Chicoutimi/Saint-Honoré Airport	Chicoutimi	Quebec	48°31′15″N 071°03′02″W
CYRI	YRI	Rivière-du-Loup Airport	Rivière-du-Loup	Quebec	47°45′52″N 069°35′04″W
CYRJ	YRJ	Roberval Airport	Roberval	Quebec	48°31′12″N 072°15′56″W
CYRL	YRL	Red Lake Airport	Red Lake	Ontario	51°03′54″N 093°47′41″W
CYRM	YRM	Rocky Mountain House Airport	Rocky Mountain House	Alberta	52°25′47″N 114°54′15″W
CYRO	YRO	Ottawa/Rockcliffe Airport (Rockcliffe Airport)	Ottawa	Ontario	45°27′38″N 075°38′36″W
CYRP	YRP	Carp Airport (Ottawa/Carp Airport)	Carp	Ontario	45°19′21″N 076°01′20″W
CYRQ	YRQ	Trois-Rivières Airport	Trois-Rivières	Quebec	46°21′10″N 072°40′46″W
CYRS	YRS	Red Sucker Lake Airport	Red Sucker Lake	Manitoba	54°10′02″N 093°33′26″W
CYRT	YRT	Rankin Inlet Airport	Rankin Inlet	Nunavut	62°48′41″N 092°06′57″W
CYSA		Stratford Municipal Airport	Stratford	Ontario	43°24′56″N 080°56′04″W
CYSB	YSB	Sudbury Airport (Greater Sudbury Airport)	Greater Sudbury	Ontario	46°37′30″N 080°47′56″W
CYSC	YSC	Sherbrooke Airport	Sherbrooke	Quebec	45°26′19″N 071°41′29″W
CYSD	YSD	CFB Suffield	Suffield	Alberta	50°16′00″N 111°11′00″W
CYSE	ZST	Squamish Airport	Squamish	British Columbia	49°46′54″N 123°09′43″W
CYSF	YSF	Stony Rapids Airport	Stony Rapids	Saskatchewan	59°15′01″N 105°50′29″W
CYSG		Saint-Georges Aerodrome	Saint-Georges	Quebec	46°05′47″N 070°42′52″W
CYSH	YSH	Smiths Falls-Montague Airport (Smiths Falls-Montague (Russ Beach) Airport)	Smiths Falls	Ontario	44°56′45″N 075°56′26″W
CYSJ	YSJ	Saint John Airport	Saint John	New Brunswick	45°18′57″N 065°53′25″W
CYSK	YSK	Sanikiluaq Airport	Sanikiluaq	Nunavut	56°32′13″N 079°15′00″W
CYSL	YSL	Saint-Léonard Aerodrome	Saint-Léonard	New Brunswick	47°09′27″N 067°50′05″W
CYSM	YSM	Fort Smith Airport	Fort Smith	Northwest Territories	60°01′13″N 111°57′43″W
CYSN	YCM	St. Catharines/Niagara District Airport	St. Catharines	Ontario	43°11′30″N 079°10′18″W
CYSP	YSP	Marathon Aerodrome	Marathon	Ontario	48°45′19″N 086°20′40″W
CYSQ		Atlin Airport	Atlin	British Columbia	59°34′36″N 133°40′08″W
CYST	YST	St. Theresa Point Airport	St. Theresa Point First Nation	Manitoba	53°50′44″N 094°51′07″W
CYSU	YSU	Summerside Airport	Summerside	Prince Edward Island	46°26′26″N 063°50′01″W
CYSW		Sparwood/Elk Valley Airport	Sparwood	British Columbia	49°50′06″N 114°52′43″W
CYSY	YSY	Sachs Harbour (David Nasogaluak Jr. Saaryuaq) Airport	Sachs Harbour	Northwest Territories	71°59′38″N 125°14′33″W
CYSZ		Sainte-Anne-des-Monts Aerodrome	Sainte-Anne-des-Monts	Quebec	49°07′12″N 066°31′44″W
CYTA	YTA	Pembroke Airport	Pembroke	Ontario	45°51′52″N 077°15′06″W
CYTB		Tillsonburg Airport	Tillsonburg	Ontario	42°55′35″N 080°44′49″W
CYTE	YTE	Kinngait Airport	Kinngait	Nunavut	64°13′49″N 076°31′29″W
CYTF	YTF	Alma Airport	Alma	Quebec	48°30′31″N 071°38′29″W
CYTH	YTH	Thompson Airport	Thompson	Manitoba	55°48′12″N 097°51′45″W
CYTL	YTL	Big Trout Lake Airport	Kitchenuhmaykoosib Inninuwug First Nation	Ontario	53°49′04″N 089°53′49″W
CYTN		Trenton Aerodrome	Trenton	Nova Scotia	45°36′43″N 062°37′16″W
CYTQ	YTQ	Tasiujaq Airport	Tasiujaq	Quebec	58°40′04″N 069°57′21″W
CYTR	YTR	CFB Trenton (Trenton Airport)	Trenton	Ontario	44°07′09″N 077°31′42″W
CYTS	YTS	Timmins Victor M. Power Airport	Timmins	Ontario	48°34′09″N 081°22′39″W
CYTZ	YTZ	Billy Bishop Toronto City Airport (City Centre Airport, Toronto Island Airport)	Toronto	Ontario	43°37′39″N 079°23′46″W
CYUB	YUB	Tuktoyaktuk/James Gruben Airport	Tuktoyaktuk	Northwest Territories	69°26′00″N 133°01′35″W
CYUL	YUL	Montréal–Trudeau International Airport	Montreal	Quebec	45°28′14″N 073°44′27″W
CYUT	YUT	Naujaat Airport	Naujaat	Nunavut	66°31′17″N 086°13′29″W
CYUX	YUX	Sanirajak Airport	Sanirajak	Nunavut	68°46′32″N 081°14′40″W
CYUY	YUY	Rouyn-Noranda Airport	Rouyn-Noranda	Quebec	48°12′22″N 078°50′08″W
CYVB	YVB	Bonaventure Airport	Bonaventure	Quebec	48°04′16″N 065°27′37″W
CYVC	YVC	La Ronge (Barber Field) Airport	La Ronge	Saskatchewan	55°09′05″N 105°15′43″W
CYVD		Virden/R.J. (Bob) Andrew Field Regional Aerodrome	Virden	Manitoba	49°52′42″N 100°54′53″W
CYVG		Vermilion Airport	Vermilion	Alberta	53°21′25″N 110°49′29″W
CYVK	YVE	Vernon Regional Airport	Vernon	British Columbia	50°14′45″N 119°19′54″W
CYVL	YCK	Colville Lake/Tommy Kochon Aerodrome	Colville Lake	Northwest Territories	67°02′00″N 126°05′00″W
CYVM	YVM	Qikiqtarjuaq Airport	Qikiqtarjuaq	Nunavut	67°32′45″N 064°01′53″W
CYVO	YVO	Val-d'Or Airport	Val-d'Or	Quebec	48°03′12″N 077°46′58″W
CYVP	YVP	Kuujjuaq Airport	Kuujjuaq	Quebec	58°05′46″N 068°25′37″W
CYVQ	YVQ	Norman Wells Airport	Norman Wells	Northwest Territories	65°16′54″N 126°47′54″W
CYVR	YVR	Vancouver International Airport	Vancouver	British Columbia	49°11′41″N 123°10′57″W
CYVT	YVT	Buffalo Narrows Airport	Buffalo Narrows	Saskatchewan	55°50′31″N 108°25′04″W
CYVV	YVV	Wiarton Airport	Wiarton	Ontario	44°44′45″N 081°06′26″W
CYVZ	YVZ	Deer Lake Airport	Deer Lake First Nation	Ontario	52°39′21″N 094°03′41″W
CYWA	YWA	Petawawa Heliport	Petawawa	Ontario	45°57′01″N 077°19′09″W
CYWE		Wekweètì Airport	Wekweètì	Northwest Territories	64°11′27″N 114°04′36″W
CYWG	YWG	Winnipeg Richardson International Airport (CFB Winnipeg)	Winnipeg	Manitoba	49°54′36″N 097°14′24″W
CYWH	YWH	Victoria Inner Harbour Airport (Victoria Harbour Water Airport)	Victoria	British Columbia	48°25′22″N 123°23′15″W
CYWJ	YWJ	Déline Airport	Délı̨nę	Northwest Territories	65°12′40″N 123°26′11″W
CYWK	YWK	Wabush Airport	Wabush	Newfoundland and Labrador	52°55′22″N 066°51′53″W
CYWL	YWL	Williams Lake Airport	Williams Lake	British Columbia	52°11′00″N 122°03′16″W
CYWM		Athabasca Regional Airport	Athabasca	Alberta	54°44′35″N 113°12′19″W
CYWN		Wainwright/Wainwright (Field 21) Airport (CFB Wainwright) (Note: Wainwright/Camp Wainwright Field Airport is a 5,036 ft (1,535 m) grass strip located at the base, and Wainwright/Wainwright (Field 21) Airport is a 7,349 ft (2,240 m) asphalt runway approximately 7 NM (13 km; 8.1 mi) west of the base.)	Wainwright	Alberta	52°49′51″N 111°06′04″W
CYWP	YWP	Webequie Airport	Webequie First Nation	Ontario	52°57′34″N 087°22′31″W
CYWV	YWV	Wainwright Aerodrome	Wainwright	Alberta	52°47′48″N 110°51′31″W
CYWY	YWY	Wrigley Airport	Wrigley	Northwest Territories	63°12′34″N 123°26′12″W
CYXC	YXC	Cranbrook/Canadian Rockies International Airport	Cranbrook	British Columbia	49°36′44″N 115°46′55″W
CYXE	YXE	Saskatoon John G. Diefenbaker International Airport	Saskatoon	Saskatchewan	52°10′15″N 106°41′59″W
CYXH	YXH	Medicine Hat Airport	Medicine Hat	Alberta	50°01′08″N 110°43′14″W
CYXJ	YXJ	Fort St. John Airport (North Peace Airport)	Fort St. John	British Columbia	56°14′17″N 120°44′25″W
CYXK	YXK	Rimouski Aerodrome	Rimouski	Quebec	48°28′41″N 068°29′49″W
CYXL	YXL	Sioux Lookout Airport	Sioux Lookout	Ontario	50°06′49″N 091°54′20″W
CYXN	YXN	Whale Cove Airport	Whale Cove	Nunavut	62°14′24″N 092°35′53″W
CYXP	YXP	Pangnirtung Airport	Pangnirtung	Nunavut	66°08′42″N 065°42′49″W
CYXQ	YXQ	Beaver Creek Airport	Beaver Creek	Yukon	62°24′37″N 140°52′03″W
CYXR	YXR	Earlton (Timiskaming Regional) Airport	Earlton	Ontario	47°41′42″N 079°50′56″W
CYXS	YXS	Prince George Airport	Prince George	British Columbia	53°53′03″N 122°40′39″W
CYXT	YGB	Northwest Regional Airport Terrace-Kitimat (Terrace Airport)	Terrace / Kitimat	British Columbia	54°28′07″N 128°34′42″W
CYXU	YXU	London International Airport	London	Ontario	43°01′59″N 081°09′04″W
CYXX	YXX	Abbotsford International Airport	Abbotsford	British Columbia	49°01′31″N 122°21′38″W
CYXY	YXY	Erik Nielsen Whitehorse International Airport	Whitehorse	Yukon	60°42′34″N 135°04′08″W
CYXZ	YXZ	Wawa Airport	Wawa	Ontario	47°58′01″N 084°47′11″W
CYYB	YYB	North Bay/Jack Garland Airport (North Bay Airport)	North Bay	Ontario	46°21′49″N 079°25′22″W
CYYC	YYC	YYC Calgary International Airport (Calgary/YYC Calgary International Airport)	Calgary	Alberta	51°06′50″N 114°01′13″W
CYYD	YYD	Smithers Airport	Smithers	British Columbia	54°49′31″N 127°10′58″W
CYYE	YYE	Fort Nelson Airport	Fort Nelson	British Columbia	58°50′14″N 122°36′05″W
CYYF	YYF	Penticton Regional Airport	Penticton	British Columbia	49°27′45″N 119°36′08″W
CYYG	YYG	Charlottetown Airport	Charlottetown	Prince Edward Island	46°17′24″N 063°07′16″W
CYYH	YYH	Taloyoak Airport	Taloyoak	Nunavut	69°32′48″N 093°34′37″W
CYYJ	YYJ	Victoria International Airport	Victoria	British Columbia	48°38′49″N 123°25′33″W
CYYL	YYL	Lynn Lake Airport	Lynn Lake	Manitoba	56°51′50″N 101°04′34″W
CYYM		Cowley Airport	Cowley	Alberta	49°38′11″N 114°05′40″W
CYYN	YYN	Swift Current Airport	Swift Current	Saskatchewan	50°17′31″N 107°41′24″W
CYYO		Wynyard/W. B. Needham Field Aerodrome	Wynyard	Saskatchewan	51°48′33″N 104°10′09″W
CYYQ	YYQ	Churchill Airport	Churchill	Manitoba	58°44′26″N 094°04′00″W
CYYR	YYR	CFB Goose Bay	Happy Valley-Goose Bay	Newfoundland and Labrador	53°19′09″N 060°25′33″W
CYYT	YYT	St. John's International Airport	St. John's	Newfoundland and Labrador	47°37′07″N 052°45′09″W
CYYU	YYU	Kapuskasing Airport	Kapuskasing	Ontario	49°24′42″N 082°28′10″W
CYYW	YYW	Armstrong Airport	Armstrong	Ontario	50°17′38″N 088°54′36″W
CYYY	YYY	Mont-Joli Airport	Mont-Joli	Quebec	48°36′32″N 068°12′29″W
CYYZ	YYZ	Toronto Pearson International Airport	Toronto	Ontario	43°40′34″N 079°37′50″W
CYZE	YZE	Gore Bay-Manitoulin Airport	Gore Bay	Ontario	45°52′54″N 082°34′02″W
CYZF	YZF	Yellowknife Airport	Yellowknife	Northwest Territories	62°27′46″N 114°26′25″W
CYZG	YZG	Salluit Airport	Salluit	Quebec	62°10′46″N 075°40′02″W
CYZH	YZH	Slave Lake Airport	Slave Lake	Alberta	55°17′35″N 114°46′38″W
CYZP	YZP	Sandspit Airport	Sandspit	British Columbia	53°15′15″N 131°48′50″W
CYZR	YZR	Sarnia Chris Hadfield Airport	Sarnia	Ontario	42°59′58″N 082°18′32″W
CYZS	YZS	Coral Harbour Airport	Coral Harbour	Nunavut	64°11′36″N 083°21′34″W
CYZT	YZT	Port Hardy Airport	Port Hardy	British Columbia	50°40′50″N 127°22′00″W
CYZU	YZU	Whitecourt Airport	Whitecourt	Alberta	54°08′38″N 115°47′12″W
CYZV	YZV	Sept-Îles Airport	Sept-Îles	Quebec	50°13′24″N 066°15′56″W
CYZW	YZW	Teslin Airport	Teslin	Yukon	60°10′22″N 132°44′38″W
CYZX	YZX	CFB Greenwood (Greenwood Airport)	Greenwood	Nova Scotia	44°59′03″N 064°55′03″W
CYZY	YZY	Mackenzie Airport	Mackenzie	British Columbia	55°17′58″N 123°08′00″W

== CZ ==
Also see airport category and list.

ICAO	IATA	Airport name	Community	Province or territory	Coordinates
CZAC	ZAC	York Landing Airport	York Factory First Nation	Manitoba	56°05′23″N 096°05′27″W
CZAM	YSN	Salmon Arm Airport	Salmon Arm	British Columbia	50°40′58″N 119°13′43″W
CZBA		Burlington Executive Airport	Burlington	Ontario	43°26′30″N 079°51′01″W
CZBB	YDT	Boundary Bay Airport (Vancouver/Boundary Bay Airport)	Delta	British Columbia	49°04′24″N 123°00′30″W
CZBD	ILF	Ilford Airport	Ilford	Manitoba	56°03′41″N 095°36′50″W
CZBF	ZBF	Bathurst Airport	Bathurst	New Brunswick	47°26′54″N 067°37′29″W
CZBM	ZBM	Roland-Désourdy Airport (Bromont (Roland Désourdy) Airport)	Bromont	Quebec	45°17′27″N 072°44′29″W
CZEE	KES	Kelsey Airport	Kelsey	Manitoba	56°02′15″N 096°30′21″W
CZEM	ZEM	Eastmain River Airport	Eastmain	Quebec	52°13′35″N 078°31′21″W
CZFA	ZFA	Faro Airport	Faro	Yukon	62°12′27″N 133°22′33″W
CZFD	ZFD	Fond-du-Lac Airport	Fond du Lac Denesuline First Nation	Saskatchewan	59°20′04″N 107°10′55″W
CZFG	XPK	Pukatawagan Airport	Mathias Colomb First Nation	Manitoba	55°44′57″N 101°15′59″W
CZFM	ZFM	Fort McPherson Airport	Fort McPherson	Northwest Territories	67°24′27″N 134°51′38″W
CZFN	ZFN	Tulita Airport	Tulita	Northwest Territories	64°54′35″N 125°34′21″W
CZGF	ZGF	Grand Forks Airport	Grand Forks	British Columbia	49°00′56″N 118°25′50″W
CZGI	ZGI	Gods River Airport	Manto Sipi Cree Nation	Manitoba	54°50′23″N 094°04′43″W
CZGR	ZGR	Little Grand Rapids Airport	Little Grand Rapids	Manitoba	52°02′42″N 095°27′58″W
CZHP		High Prairie Airport	High Prairie	Alberta	55°23′37″N 116°28′30″W
CZJG	ZJG	Jenpeg Airport	Jenpeg	Manitoba	54°31′08″N 098°02′46″W
CZJN	ZJN	Swan River Airport	Swan River	Manitoba	52°07′17″N 101°14′04″W
CZKE	ZKE	Kashechewan Airport	Kashechewan First Nation	Ontario	52°16′57″N 081°40′40″W
CZLQ	YTD	Thicket Portage Airport	Thicket Portage	Manitoba	55°19′08″N 097°42′28″W
CZMD	MSA	Muskrat Dam Airport	Muskrat Dam Lake First Nation	Ontario	53°26′29″N 091°45′46″W
CZML	ZMH	South Cariboo Regional Airport (108 Mile Ranch Airport)	108 Mile Ranch	British Columbia	51°44′10″N 121°19′58″W
CZMN	PIW	Pikwitonei Airport	Pikwitonei	Manitoba	55°35′22″N 097°09′49″W
CZMT	ZMT	Masset Airport	Masset	British Columbia	54°01′38″N 132°07′30″W
CZNG	XPP	Poplar River Airport	Poplar River First Nation	Manitoba	53°59′47″N 097°16′25″W
CZNL		Nelson Airport	Nelson	British Columbia	49°29′39″N 117°18′02″W
CZPB	ZPB	Sachigo Lake Airport	Sachigo Lake First Nation	Ontario	53°53′28″N 092°11′47″W
CZPC		Pincher Creek Airport	Pincher Creek	Alberta	49°31′14″N 113°59′46″W
CZPO		Pinehouse Lake Airport	Pinehouse	Saskatchewan	55°31′41″N 106°34′56″W
CZRJ	ZRJ	Round Lake (Weagamow Lake) Airport	North Caribou Lake First Nation	Ontario	52°56′37″N 091°18′46″W
CZSJ	ZSJ	Sandy Lake Airport	Sandy Lake First Nation	Ontario	53°03′51″N 093°20′40″W
CZSN	XSI	South Indian Lake Airport	South Indian Lake	Manitoba	56°47′34″N 098°54′26″W
CZST		Stewart Aerodrome	Stewart	British Columbia	55°56′00″N 129°59′00″W
CZSW	ZSW	Prince Rupert/Seal Cove Water Aerodrome	Prince Rupert	British Columbia	54°20′00″N 130°17′00″W
CZTA	YDV	Bloodvein River Airport	Bloodvein First Nation	Manitoba	51°47′04″N 096°41′32″W
CZTM	ZTM	Shamattawa Airport	Shamattawa First Nation	Manitoba	55°51′56″N 092°04′53″W
CZUC	ZUC	Ignace Municipal Airport	Ignace	Ontario	49°25′47″N 091°43′04″W
CZUM	ZUM	Churchill Falls Airport	Churchill Falls	Newfoundland and Labrador	53°33′43″N 064°06′23″W
CZVL		Villeneuve Airport (Edmonton/Villeneuve Airport)	Villeneuve	Alberta	53°40′03″N 113°51′16″W
CZWH	XLB	Lac Brochet Airport	Lac Brochet	Manitoba	58°36′52″N 101°28′08″W
CZWL	ZWL	Wollaston Lake Airport	Hatchet Lake Denesuline First Nation	Saskatchewan	58°06′25″N 103°10′20″W
