= Sowind Air Flight 301 =

1997 aviation accident in Canada

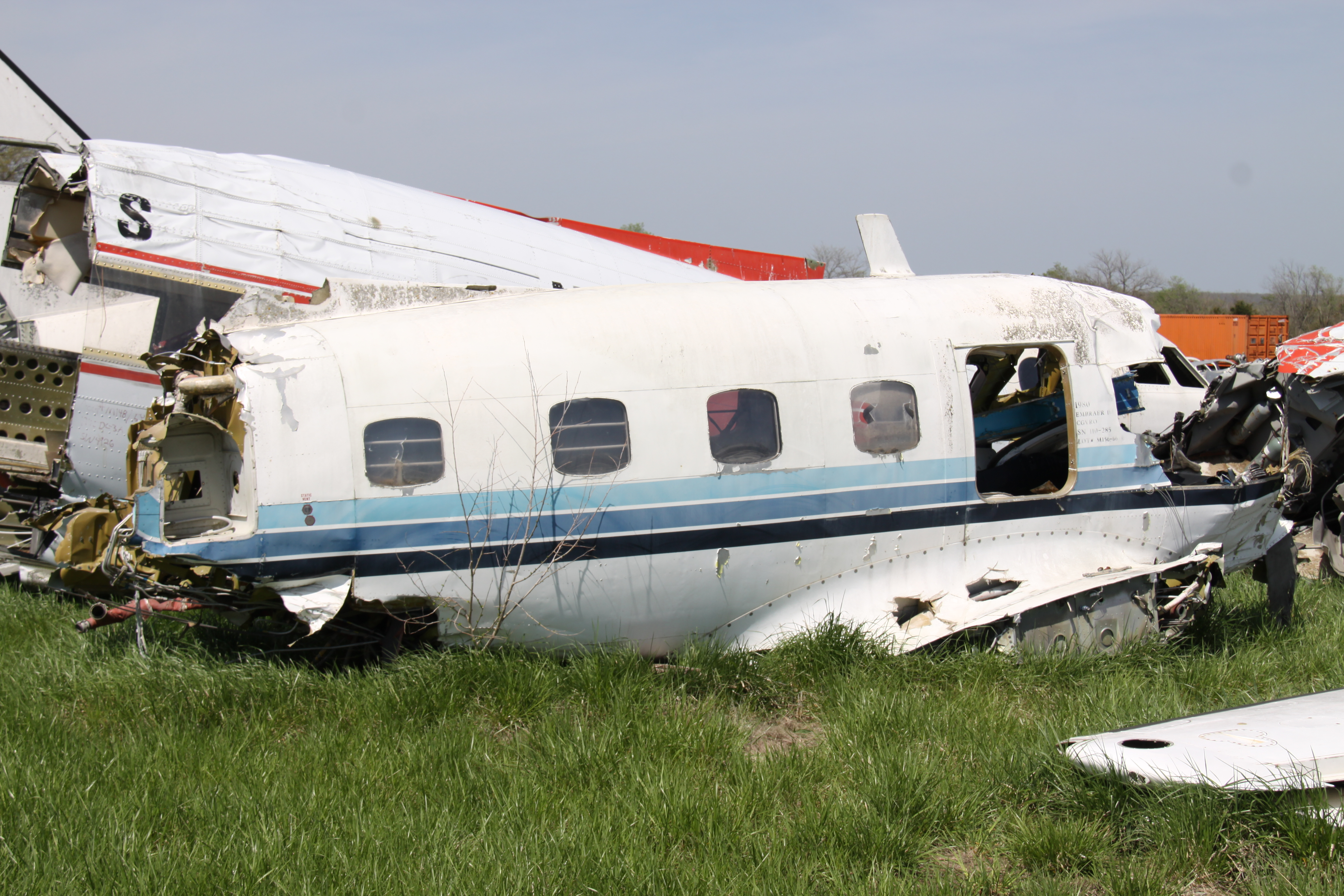
- The stored wreckage of the aircraft

Accident
- Date: 9 December 1997
- Summary: Controlled flight into terrain; crashed while flying below the minimum altitude and failed to go around
- Site: 28.8 kilometers W of Little Grand Rapids, Manitoba, Canada; 52°01′59″N 95°53′04″W

Aircraft
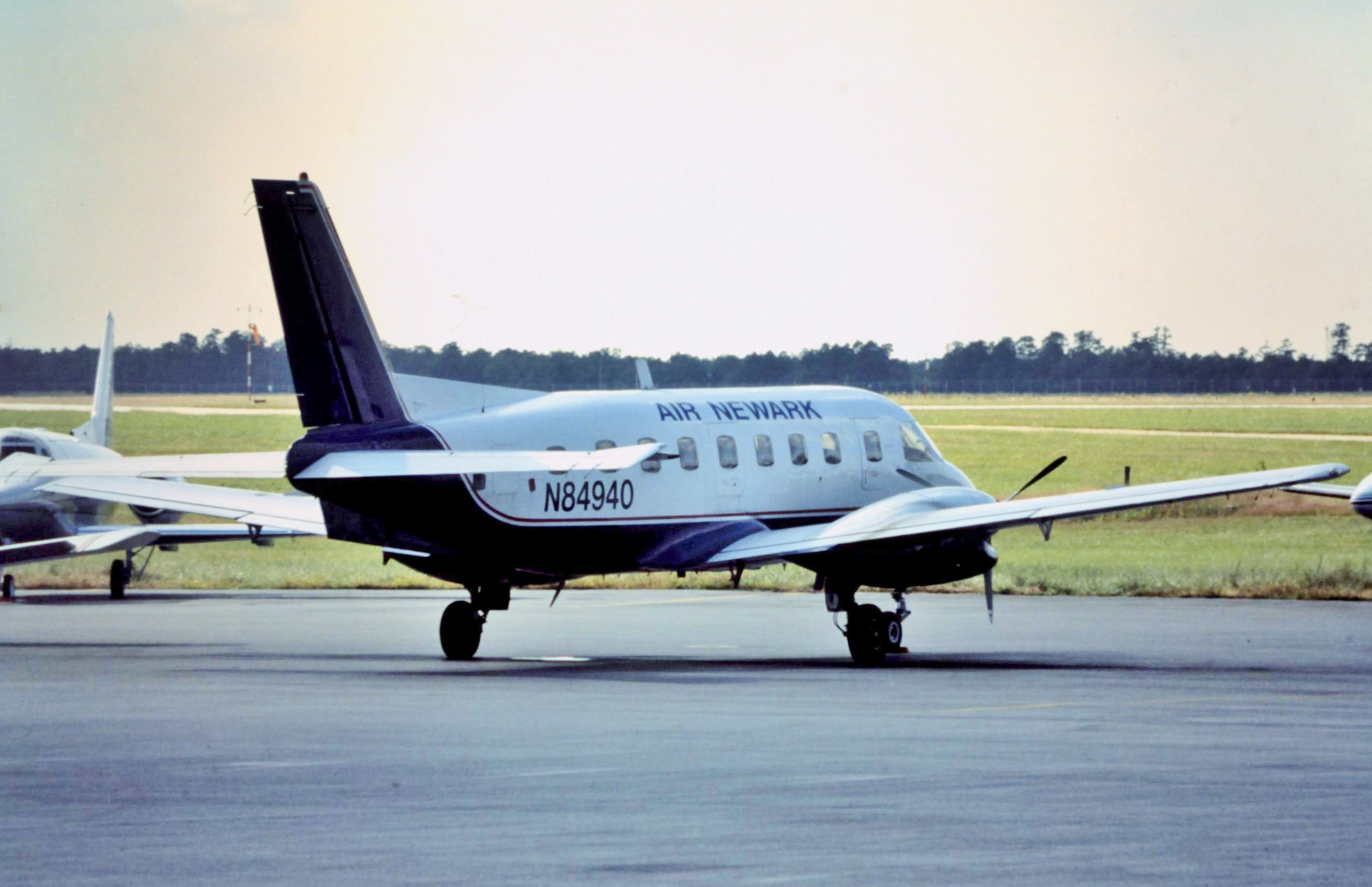
- The aircraft involved in the accident, while still in service with Air Newark in 1990
- Aircraft type: Embraer EMB 110P1 Bandeirante
- Operator: Sowind Air
- ICAO flight No.: SOW301
- Call sign: SOWIND 301
- Registration: C-GVRO
- Flight origin: Winnipeg/St. Andrews Airport, Manitoba, Canada
- Destination: Little Grand Rapids Airport, Manitoba, Canada
- Occupants: 17
- Passengers: 15
- Crew: 2
- Fatalities: 4
- Injuries: 13
- Survivors: 13

On December 9, 1997, Sowind Air Flight 301, an Embraer EMB 110P1 Bandeirante operating a regional flight in Manitoba, Canada, from Winnipeg/St. Andrews Airport to Little Grand Rapids Airport, crashed on approach to its destination, killing four of the 17 people on board and injuring the survivors. An investigation into the accident found out that the aircraft was being flown below the minimum safe altitude for the area, so, when the crew made a turn and descended, it impacted terrain. The presence of fog in the area, and the overloading of the aircraft were also contributing factors.

== Background ==
=== Aircraft ===
The aircraft involved in the accident was an Embraer EMB 110P1 Bandeirante, registered as C-GVRO manufactured in 1980 and acquired by Sowind Air in 1996.

=== Passengers and crew ===
The aircraft had two pilots on board. The recently hired captain was 62 years old, he had a total of 15000 flight hours, of which 114 were on the EMB-110. The captain was involved in the past in aviation occurrences caused by errors in weight calculation and the performing of a visual flight rules approach, errors similar to the ones that lead to the crash of Flight 301. The first officer was 30 years old, he had a total of 700 flight hours, of which 367 on the EMB-110. On board there were also 15 passengers, including staff of the University of Manitoba Northern Medical Unit.

== Accident ==
=== Flight ===
At 2:15 pm local time the aircraft departed, with 15 passengers and two crew members on board, from Winnipeg/St. Andrews Airport for a 40 minutes VFR flight to Little Grand Rapids Airport. The flight went uneventful until approach when, in fog and low cloud ceiling conditions, the radio airport manager in Little Grand Rapids informed the crew of Flight 301 that he did not have their aircraft in sight, so the pilots initiated a missed approach procedure. Soon after Sowind Air Flight 318, another flight of the airline operated by a Piper PA-31 Navajo, landed at Little Grand Rapids, and the crew of Flight 318 contacted Flight 301 informing them that the visibility now was about 3 kilometers. So the crew of Flight 301 initiated a second approach. As the EMB-110 was descending south-west of the airport, near Allan Johnston Lake, the power to its engines was increased, the aircraft banked left and then right and crashed into trees at around 3:26 pm local time. Four people, the captain and three passengers, of the 17 on board were killed. The aircraft forward section was destroyed by the impact, due to this it's where the fatalities were located, while the rear section remained relatively intact.

=== Rescue operations ===
A fire truck was sent from Little Grand Rapids Airport across the frozen lake soon after contact with the aircraft was lost. Also local residents reached the crash site on board snowmobiles, helping with the rescue operations. Three survivors, that had the most serious injuries, were immediately transported to Little Grand Rapids Airport and then airlifted to Winnipeg with the Piper PA-31 Navajo that operated Flight 318. The less seriously injured passengers had to wait more than a day to be trasported to Winnipeg, due to adverse weather conditions.

== Investigation ==
The Transportation Safety Board of Canada started an investigation into the crash, and published a final report on it in late 1999. The investigators found out that the pilots of aircraft continued to fly below the minimum safe altitude, established for that area in those weather conditions, resulting in a case of controlled flight into terrain. The airplane was not equipped with a ground proximity warning system, but it was not required to for this kind of flights. The aircraft was also found to be about 450 kilograms heavier than the maximum weight allowed; this could have led to difficulties in controlling the aircraft on approach, making a go around impossible at such an altitude. The investigation detected multiple violations of the aviation safety norms in Sowind Air's procedures, and Transport Canada was criticized for underestimating them

== Aftermath ==
Due to the multiple violations of safety norms Sowind Air voluntary suspended its air operator certificate. The airline then modernized its fleet and changed its management until it got the air operator certificate back. The University of Manitoba's comprehensive policy was set to pay 800 000 dollars of insurance to the physicians of the Northern Medical Unit involved in the accident.

== See also ==
- Controlled flight into terrain
