= Northway Aviation =

Canadian bush airline

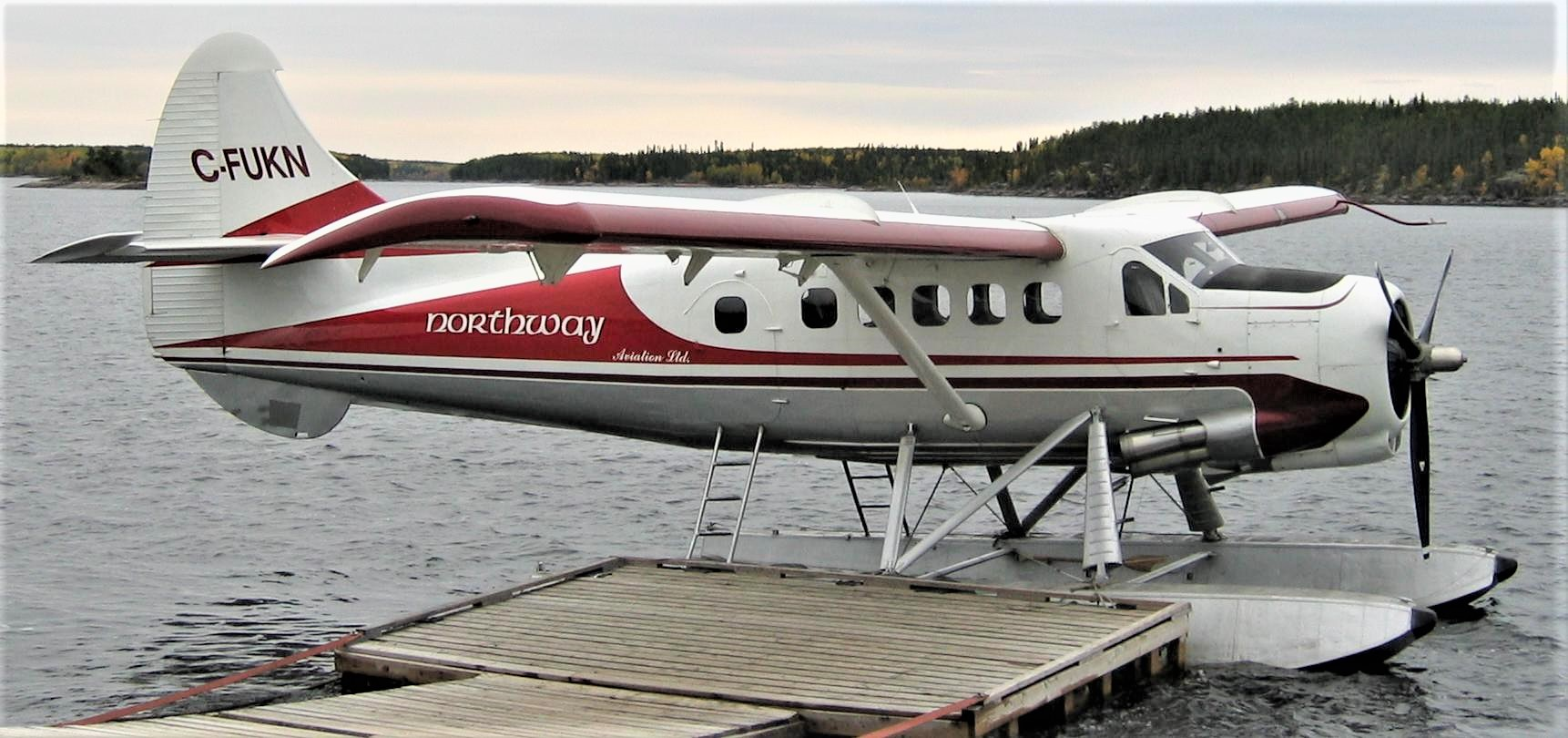
- Formerly owned DHC-3 Otter
IATA	ICAO	Call sign
—	NAL	NORTHWAY
- Founded: 1962
- AOC #: 1568
- Operating bases: Rural Municipality of St. Andrews
- Hubs: St. Andrews Airport
- Fleet size: 9
- Destinations: 14
- Website: http://www.northwayav.com

Northway Aviation Ltd is a Canadian bush airline providing scheduled and charter passenger and freight service from St. Andrews Airport, St Andrews, Manitoba, Canada utilizing both wheel and float equipped aircraft.

The 22-minute Canadian documentary film, Bush Pilot: Reflections on a Canadian Myth, made in 1980 by the National Film Board of Canada (NFB) and directed by Norma Bailey and Robert Lower, is about the early days of Northway Aviation and Canadian bush flying.

== History ==
Northway Aviation was established and started charter operations in 1962, and is owned and operated by the Johnson family. Northway once operated out of Arnes (wheels and skis) and Willow Island (floats). The floatplanes eventually moved to the Icelandic River in Riverton. Operations out of Winnipeg began in the 1980s and relocated to St. Andrews and Pine Dock in the 1990s.

== Destinations ==
Northway Aviation provides scheduled services to thirteen First Nations communities in Manitoba and Ontario and charter services throughout North America:

- Manitoba
  - Berens River First Nation (Berens River Airport)
  - Bloodvein First Nation (Bloodvein River Airport)
  - Garden Hill First Nation (Island Lake Airport)
  - Gods Lake Narrows (Gods Lake Narrows Airport)
  - Manto Sipi Cree Nation (God's River) (Gods Lake Airport)
  - Little Grand Rapids First Nation (Little Grand Rapids Airport)
  - Oxford House (Oxford House Airport)
  - Pauingassi First Nation (Little Grand Rapids Airport)
  - Red Sucker Lake First Nation (Red Sucker Lake Airport)
  - Rural Municipality of St. Andrews (St. Andrews Airport)
  - St. Theresa Point First Nation (St. Theresa Point Airport)
- Ontario
  - Deer Lake First Nation (Deer Lake Airport)
  - Keewaywin First Nation (Sandy Lake Airport)
  - Poplar Hill First Nation (Poplar Hill Airport)

== Fleet ==
Northway Aviation operates a small fleet of Cessna Caravan 208s and Grand Caravans. In 2015, Northway Aviation purchased a Pilatus PC12-47 EFIS single engine turboprop. Two more PC-12s have been added to the fleet since then.

Northway Aviation fleet
Aircraft	No. of aircraft	Variants	Notes
Cessna 208 Caravan	6	2 208 Caravan, 4 208B Grand Caravan	
Pilatus PC-12	3	PC-12NG	

Previously flown aircraft are:

- Britten-Norman BN-2 Islander
- Cessna 180
- Cessna 185
- Cessna 207
- Cessna Grand Caravan
- DHC-2 Beaver
- DHC-3 Otter
- GippsAero GA8 Airvan
- Noorduyn Norseman
- Pilatus PC-12
- Piper PA-31
