= YST =

YST may refer to:

- Yolk sac tumor, a cancer
- Yukon Standard Time, a timezone used in Yukon, Canada
- St. Theresa Point Airport, Manitoba, Canada
- Yamaha Sound Technologies Inc., part of Yamaha Corporation
- Ronin Warriors (Japanese: Yoroiden Samurai Torūpā, lit. 'Legendary Armor Samurai Troopers'), an anime series and manga
