= Bush Pilot: Reflections on a Canadian Myth =

- Theatrical poster
- Directed by: Norma Bailey; Robert Lower (credited as Bob Lower)
- Written by: Robert Lower
- Produced by: Jerry Krepakevich; Michael J.F. Scott (credited as Michael Scott) (Executive producer)
- Narrated by: Brian Richardson
- Cinematography: Richard A. Stringer (credited as R.A. Stringer)
- Edited by: Jane Creba
- Production company: National Film Board of Canada
- Distributed by: National Film Board of Canada
- Release date: January 21, 1981
- Running time: 22 minutes, 32 seconds
- Country: Canada
- Language: English

Bush Pilot: Reflections on a Canadian Myth is a 22-minute Canadian documentary film, made in 1980 by the National Film Board of Canada (NFB) and directed by Norma Bailey and Robert Lower. Shot in northern Manitoba, the film explores the myth of the bush pilot as a heroic and iconic figure in the Canada's north.

== Synopsis ==
Noorduyn Norseman (CF-GUE) from Northway Aviation was prominently featured in Bush Pilot: Reflections on a Canadian Myth.

From the 1920s, the bush pilot had been instrumental in pushing back the frontiers of Canada, both westward and northward. In order to traverse the great stretches of northern bush and lake country, bush planes became the preferred means, supplanting the canoe and dog sled. Originally introduced in 1935, the Noorduyn Norseman was one of the first purpose-built aircraft to work in Canada's remote and unsettled regions. Remaining in production for almost 25 years with over 900 produced, a number of examples of Noorduyn Norseman aircraft remain in commercial and private use to this day.

In 1974, Northway Aviation pilot Jim Beauchamp left his job as a bank executive, to follow his dream of becoming a bush pilot, flying the Noorduyn Norseman. Even though he is aware of the romantic notion that many might attach to his job, most times it is just a job, with long hours and back-breaking work in an isolated and often hostile environment. His boss, Jim Johnson simply describes flying in the north as pilots acting as either a bus or taxi driver.

For over 25 years, Northway from its floatplane base at the Icelandic River in Riverton, Manitoba, maintained a lifeline to the small towns cradling Lake Winnipeg. While fresh produce and groceries, building materials and equipment were flown north, some communities hauled out fish, fur and wild rice harvested on the lakes. With the development of larger, more modern communities such as Thompson, Manitoba, northern isolation was coming to an end, and the myth of the bush pilot as a heroic figure was also fading.

== Production ==
Directors Norma Bailey and Robert Lower began pre-production in 1978, originally intending to make a film as an homage to the Noorduyn Norseman bush plane. Both directors grew up in rural Manitoba and had flown extensively on bush planes, with Lower having his own private pilot's licence.

As they gathered footage at the Northway Aviation Ltd. and Lambair Ltd. airlines that flew the Norseman, as well as accessing archival footage shot by the bush pilots of the 1920s and 1930s, the story changed to one of the bush pilots rather than the aircraft they flew. Principal photography ended in 1980. (Note: Most of the filming took place in Riverton, Manitoba, the locale chosen later for one of the film's premieres.)

== Reception ==
Bush Pilot: Reflections on a Canadian Myth was well received as a documentary and had its initial release in Manitoba with public showings in Riverton, Manitoba and Winnipeg on January 21, 1981. In a recent review, pilot and author Mike Singer called the film, "a tribute to the bush pilot". "The short 23 minute film features a Mk IV Noorduyn Norseman operated by Northway Aviation of Manitoba, and includes archival footage, as well as interviews with pilots. It's well worth watching if you have any interest in bush flying, or in the history of Canadian Aviation."

Bush Pilot played on several television stations of the CBC Northern service in November 1981. Some CBC and CTV affiliates in Saskatchewan, as well as CITY TV in Toronto over the next few years, broadcast the film. A television sale was also made to the public service television network of Spain (RTV Television Espanola). The film was subsequently released in 16 mm in the non-theatrical market for use in schools in Canada, distributed by the National Film Board of Canada.
