= List of airports in the Winnipeg area =

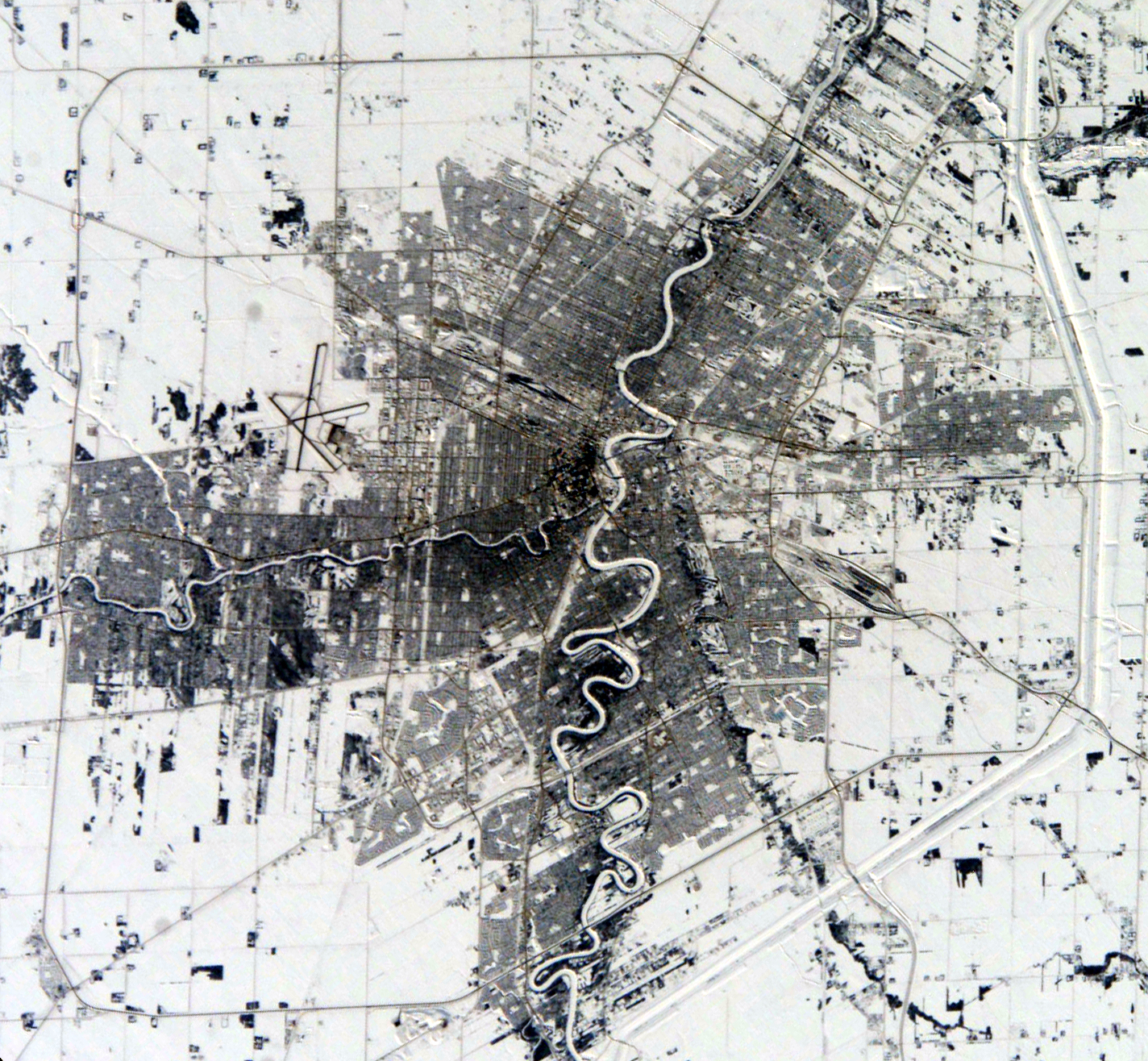
Location in Winnipeg

This is a list of airports in the Winnipeg area in the Canadian province of Manitoba.

== Airports ==
Airport names in italics are part of the National Airports System.

Airport name	ICAO/TC LID/IATA	Location	Coordinates
Winnipeg James Armstrong Richardson International Airport	CYWG (YWG)	Winnipeg	49°54′36″N 097°14′24″W
Winnipeg/Lyncrest Airport	CJL5	Lyncrest	49°51′09″N 096°58′25″W
Winnipeg/St. Andrews Airport	CYAV (YAV)	St. Andrews	50°03′22″N 097°01′57″W
Starbuck Airport	CKJ7	Starbuck	49°43′00″N 097°41′00″W
Winnipeg (City of Winnipeg) Heliport	CWG2	Winnipeg	49°54′01″N 097°05′44″W
Winnipeg (Health Sciences Centre) Heliport	CWH7	Winnipeg	49°54′15″N 097°09′23″W

== See also ==
- List of airports in Manitoba
