= Poplar River Airport =

Airport in Manitoba, Canada

- IATA: XPP; ICAO: CZNG

Summary
- Airport type: Public
- Operator: Government of Manitoba
- Location: Poplar River First Nation
- Time zone: CST (UTC−06:00)
  - Summer (DST): CDT (UTC−05:00)
- Elevation AMSL: 725 ft (221 m)
- Coordinates: 52°59′47″N 097°16′25″W

Map
- Location in Manitoba CZNG (Canada)

Runways
Direction	Length		Surface
Direction	ft	m	Surface
10/28	2,500	762	Crushed rock

Statistics (2010)
- Aircraft movements: 2,108
- Source: Canada Flight Supplement; Movements from Statistics Canada

Poplar River Airport (IATA: XPP, ICAO: CZNG) is located adjacent to Poplar River First Nation, Manitoba, Canada.

== Airlines and destinations ==
Airlines	Destinations
Northway Aviation	Winnipeg/St. Andrews

== See also ==
- List of airports in Manitoba
