= Oxford House Airport =

Airport in Manitoba, Canada

- IATA: YOH; ICAO: CYOH

Summary
- Airport type: Public
- Operator: Government of Manitoba
- Location: Oxford House, Manitoba
- Time zone: CST (UTC−06:00)
  - Summer (DST): CDT (UTC−05:00)
- Elevation AMSL: 663 ft / 202 m
- Coordinates: 54°55′59″N 095°16′44″W

Map
- Location in Manitoba CYOH (Canada)

Runways
Direction	Length		Surface
Direction	ft	m	Surface
05/23	3,829	1,167	Crushed rock

Statistics (2010)
- Aircraft movements: 2,512
- Source: Canada Flight Supplement; Movements from Statistics Canada

Oxford House Airport (IATA: YOH, ICAO: CYOH) is located 0.5 nautical miles (0.93 km; 0.58 mi) west of Oxford House, Manitoba, Canada.

== Airlines and destinations ==
Airlines	Destinations
Northway Aviation	Winnipeg/St. Andrews
Perimeter Aviation	Gods Lake Narrows, Thompson, Winnipeg

== See also ==
- List of airports in Manitoba
