= List of airports in Manitoba =

Manitoba

This is a list of airports in Manitoba. It includes all Nav Canada certified and registered water and land airports, aerodromes and heliports in the Canadian province of Manitoba. Airport names in italics are part of the National Airports System.

== List of airports and heliports ==
The list is sorted by the name of the community served; click the sort buttons in the table header to switch listing order.

Community	Airport name	PU PR MI	AOE (Note: An airport of entry has four different categories. An AOE which can accept "all classes of scheduled and non-scheduled aircraft (passenger and cargo)." An AOE/# which can handle aircraft in the previous category but up to maximum number. This number can be exceeded if done in stages as shown in parentheses. An AOE/15 that can accept general aviation aircraft with a maximum of 15 passengers. An AOE/CAN which can handle aircraft subject to the CANPASS regulations.)	Operator	Elevation	ICAO	TC LID	IATA	Image	Coordinates
Arborg	Arborg Airport	PU		Arborg Bifrost Airport Commission	765 ft (233 m)		CJU6			50°54′46″N 97°18′16″W
Ashern	Ashern Airport	PU		Ashern Airport Commission	976 ft (297 m)		CJE7			51°09′31″N 98°19′55″W
Bakers Narrows	Flin Flon/Bakers Narrows Water Aerodrome	PU		Bakers Narrows Lodge	965 ft (294 m)		CFF8			54°40′43″N 101°39′37″W
Berens River	Berens River Airport	PU		Government of Manitoba	729 ft (222 m)	CYBV		YBV		52°21′32″N 97°01′06″W
Bissett	Bissett Water Aerodrome	PU		Blue Water Aviation	824 ft (251 m)		CJY6			51°01′00″N 95°41′00″W
Bloodvein First Nation	Bloodvein River Airport	PU		Government of Manitoba	729 ft (222 m)	CZTA		YDV		51°47′04″N 96°41′32″W
Brandon	Brandon Municipal Airport (McGill Field)	PU	15	City of Brandon	1,343 ft (409 m)	CYBR		YBR		49°54′36″N 99°57′07″W
Brochet	Brochet Airport	PU		Government of Manitoba	1,131 ft (345 m)	CYBT		YBT		57°53′22″N 101°40′45″W
Carman	Carman/Friendship Field Airport	PR		R. Diemert	882 ft (269 m)		CJB2			49°29′29″N 98°01′07″W
Carman	Carman (South) Airport	PU		Carman/Dufferin Airport Commission	876 ft (267 m)		CJS7			49°28′49″N 98°00′54″W
Churchill	Churchill Airport	PU		Transport Canada	96 ft (29 m)	CYYQ		YYQ		58°44′26″N 94°04′00″W
Churchill	Churchill (Hudson Bay Helicopters) Heliport	PR		Hudson Bay Helicopters	20 ft (6.1 m)		CHB2			58°45′59″N 94°10′04″W
Churchill	Churchill Water Aerodrome	PU		Wings over Kississing	46 ft (14 m)		CJJ7			58°42′00″N 94°03′00″W
Cooks Creek	Cooks Creek Aerodrome	PR		Thomas Stoyka	785 ft (239 m)		CCC3			50°01′55″N 96°43′58″W
Cross Lake	Cross Lake (Charlie Sinclair Memorial) Airport	PU		Government of Manitoba	706 ft (215 m)	CYCR		YCR		54°36′39″N 97°45′37″W
Crystal City	Crystal City-Pilot Mound/Louise Municipal Airport	PR		Municipality of Crystal City	1,525 ft (465 m)		CKZ6			49°08′50″N 98°52′51″W
Dauphin	Lt. Col W.G. (Billy) Barker VC Airport (RCAF Station Dauphin)	PU		Dauphin Regional Airport Authority	999 ft (304 m)	CYDN		YDN		51°06′03″N 100°03′09″W
Deloraine	Deloraine Airport	PU		Deloraine Flying Club	1,686 ft (514 m)		CJJ4			49°09′02″N 100°30′02″W
Easterville	Easterville Airport	PU		Government of Manitoba	881 ft (269 m)		CKM6			53°06′31″N 99°47′52″W
Elk Island	Elk Island Airport	PU		Elk Island Lodge	625 ft (191 m)		CKZ3			54°40′14″N 94°08′44″W
Erickson	Erickson Municipal Airport	PU		Erikson Flying Club	2,114 ft (644 m)		CKQ6			50°29′58″N 99°53′52″W
Fisher Branch	Fisher Branch Airport	PR		A. Gulay	825 ft (251 m)		CKX4			51°05′00″N 97°29′00″W
Flin Flon	Flin Flon Airport	PU		City of Flin Flon	998 ft (304 m)	CYFO		YFO		54°40′41″N 101°40′54″W
Flin Flon	Flin Flon/Channing Water Aerodrome	PU		Wings Over Kississing	957 ft (292 m)		CJK8			54°45′00″N 101°50′00″W
Fraserwood	Fraserwood/Tribble Ranch Field Aerodrome	PR		Joachim De Smedt	861 ft (262 m)		CTR8			50°35′33″N 97°17′59″W
Gillam	Gillam Airport	PU		Town of Gillam	476 ft (145 m)	CYGX		YGX		56°21′27″N 94°42′38″W
Gillam	Gillam Water Aerodrome	PU		Gilliam Air Services	470 ft (140 m)		CJP8			56°21′14″N 94°39′26″W
Gimli	Gimli Industrial Park Airport	PU		Rural Municipality of Gimli	752 ft (229 m)	CYGM		YGM		50°37′41″N 97°02′36″W
Gladstone	Gladstone Aerodrome	PU		Municipality of WestLake-Gladstone	900 ft (270 m)		CJR5			50°09′49″N 98°56′33″W
Glenboro	Glenboro Airport	PU		Glenboro Municipal Airport Commission	1,240 ft (380 m)		CJJ2			49°33′00″N 99°20′00″W
Gods Lake	Gods Lake Airport	PU		Gods Lake Haven	605 ft (184 m)		CJB6			54°46′45″N 93°43′01″W
Gods Lake Narrows	Gods Lake Narrows Airport	PU		Government of Manitoba	617 ft (188 m)	CYGO		YGO		54°33′30″N 94°29′27″W
Grand Rapids	Grand Rapids Aerodrome	PR		Manitoba Hydro	861 ft (262 m)		CJV8			53°10′21″N 99°19′23″W
Gunisao Lake	Gunisao Lake Airport	PR		Budd's Gunisao Lake Lodge	886 ft (270 m)		CJK2			53°31′12″N 96°22′16″W
Gunisao Lake	Gunisao Lake Water Aerodrome	PR		Budd's Gunisao Lake Lodge	866 ft (264 m)		CJW8			53°31′00″N 96°22′00″W
Homewood	Homewood Airport	PR		R. Hill	815 ft (248 m)		CJT8			49°30′33″N 97°51′02″W
Ilford	Ilford Airport	PU		Government of Manitoba	643 ft (196 m)	CZBD		ILF		56°03′41″N 95°36′50″W
Island Lake	Island Lake Airport	PU		Government of Manitoba	772 ft (235 m)	CYIV		YIV		53°51′26″N 94°39′13″W
Jenpeg	Jenpeg Airport	PR		Manitoba Hydro	729 ft (222 m)	CZJG		ZJG		54°31′08″N 98°02′46″W
Kaskattama River	Kaskattama River Aerodrome	PR		Kaskattama Safari Adventures	30 ft (9.1 m)		CAS3			57°02′29″N 90°06′46″W
Kelsey	Kelsey Airport	PR		Manitoba Hydro	615 ft (187 m)	CZEE		KES		56°02′15″N 96°30′21″W
Killarney	Killarney Municipal Airport	PR		Killarney Flying Club	1,680 ft (510 m)		CJS5			49°09′06″N 99°41′25″W
Knee Lake	Knee Lake Airport	PR		North Star Transit	625 ft (191 m)		CJT3			54°54′55″N 94°47′53″W
Knee Lake	Knee Lake Water Aerodrome	PR		North Star Resort	577 ft (176 m)		CKW8			54°53′27″N 94°48′27″W
Lac Brochet	Lac Brochet Airport	PU		Government of Manitoba	1,211 ft (369 m)	CZWH		XLB		58°36′52″N 101°28′08″W
Lac du Bonnet	Bird River (Lac du Bonnet) Airport	PU		Tall Timber Aviation	950 ft (290 m)		CJP7			50°23′48″N 95°44′06″W
Lac du Bonnet	Bird River Water Aerodrome	PU		Tall Timber Aviation	836 ft (255 m)		CJX6			50°24′00″N 95°45′00″W
Lac du Bonnet	Lac du Bonnet Airport	PU		Lac du Bonnet Regional Airport Authority	850 ft (260 m)	CYAX				50°17′40″N 96°00′36″W
Lac du Bonnet	Lac du Bonnet (North) Water Aerodrome	PU		Adventure Air	836 ft (255 m)		CJS9			50°17′00″N 96°00′00″W
Laurie River	Laurie River Airport	PR		Manitoba Hydro	1,200 ft (370 m)		CJC8			56°14′55″N 101°18′15″W
Leaf Rapids	Leaf Rapids Airport	PU		Community of Leaf Rapids	959 ft (292 m)	CYLR		YLR		56°30′48″N 99°59′07″W
Leaf Rapids	Leaf Rapids Water Aerodrome	PU		Wings over Kississing	849 ft (259 m)		CKA3			56°33′00″N 99°56′00″W
Little Churchill River	Little Churchill River/Dunlop's Fly In Lodge Aerodrome	PR		Dunlop's Fly In Lodge	700 ft (210 m)		CJN7			56°34′48″N 96°14′51″W
Little Grand Rapids	Little Grand Rapids Airport	PU		Government of Manitoba	1,008 ft (307 m)	CZGR		ZGR		52°02′42″N 95°27′58″W
Lundar	Lundar Airport	PU		Lundar Flying Club	830 ft (250 m)		CKR4			50°42′12″N 98°03′24″W
Lyncrest	Winnipeg/Lyncrest Airport	PU		Springfield Flying Club	775 ft (236 m)		CJL5			49°51′09″N 96°58′25″W
Lynn Lake	Lynn Lake Airport	PU		YYL Airport Inc.	1,170 ft (360 m)	CYYL		YYL		56°51′50″N 101°04′34″W
Lynn Lake	Lynn Lake (Eldon Lake) Water Aerodrome	PU		Transwest Air	1,100 ft (340 m)		CKD3			56°49′02″N 101°01′07″W
MacDonald	Macdonald Airport	PU		T.R. Bailey	840 ft (260 m)		CJU3			50°05′47″N 98°30′03″W
MacGregor	MacGregor Airfield	PU		Gordon MacDonald; Ken Kane	950 ft (290 m)		CKF6			49°58′03″N 98°45′37″W
Manitou	Manitou Airport	PU		Manitou Flying Club	1,592 ft (485 m)		CKG5			49°15′00″N 98°32′00″W
Manto Sipi Cree Nation	Gods River Airport	PU		Government of Manitoba	627 ft (191 m)	CZGI		ZGI		54°50′23″N 94°04′43″W
Mathias Colomb First Nation	Pukatawagan Airport	PU		Government of Manitoba	960 ft (290 m)	CZFG		XPK		55°44′57″N 101°15′59″W
McCreary	McCreary Airport	PU		M. Slawinski	1,000 ft (300 m)		CJR8			50°45′52″N 99°29′49″W
McGavock Lake	McGavock Lake Water Aerodrome	PU		Laurie River Lodge	1,100 ft (340 m)		CKJ3			56°34′00″N 101°30′00″W
Melita	Melita Airport	PU		Viola Carr	1,475 ft (450 m)		CJT5			49°15′42″N 101°00′50″W
Minnedosa	Minnedosa Airport	PR		K. Kane	1,840 ft (560 m)		CJU5			50°16′19″N 99°45′47″W
Molson Lake	Molson Lake Airport	PU		Norway House Cree Nation	750 ft (230 m)		CKJ8			54°15′29″N 97°00′40″W
Morden	Morden Regional Aerodrome	PU	CANPASS	City of Morden	957 ft (292 m)		CJA3			49°12′38″N 98°03′38″W
Neepawa	Neepawa Airport	PU		Town of Neepawa	1,277 ft (389 m)		CJV5			50°13′58″N 99°30′38″W
Nejanilini Lake	Nejanilini Lake Airport	PR		The Lodge at Little Duck	964 ft (294 m)	CYNN				59°29′07″N 97°46′52″W
North Seal River	North Seal River Airport	PR		North Seal River Inc.	962 ft (293 m)		CEG8			58°58′10″N 99°58′30″W
Norway House	Norway House Airport	PU		Government of Manitoba	734 ft (224 m)	CYNE		YNE		53°57′30″N 97°50′39″W
Norway House	Norway House Water Aerodrome	PU		Molson Air	712 ft (217 m)		CKY3			53°59′14″N 97°48′23″W
Nueltin Lake	Nueltin Lake Airport	PR		Nueltin Fly-in Lodges	971 ft (296 m)		CNL9			59°42′29″N 100°07′38″W
Oak Hammock Marsh	Oak Hammock Air Park Airport	PU		Terry Malley	755 ft (230 m)		CAV9			50°08′16″N 97°03′41″W
Oxford House	Oxford House Airport	PU		Government of Manitoba	663 ft (202 m)	CYOH		YOH		54°56′00″N 95°16′44″W
Pikwitonei	Pikwitonei Airport	PU		Government of Manitoba	636 ft (194 m)	CZMN		PIW		55°35′22″N 97°09′49″W
Pine Dock	Pine Dock Water Aerodrome	PR		Kitchi Airways	712 ft (217 m)		CKT8			51°36′39″N 96°49′02″W
Pipestone	Reston/R.M. of Pipestone Airport	PU		Rural Municipality of Pipestone	1,488 ft (454 m)		CRP2			49°34′50″N 101°03′10″W
Poplar River First Nation	Poplar River Airport	PU		Government of Manitoba	725 ft (221 m)	CZNG		XPP		53°59′47″N 97°16′25″W
Portage la Prairie	Portage (District General Hospital) Heliport	PR		Southern Health Portage District General Hospital	857 ft (261 m)		CPO2			49°57′59″N 98°16′56″W
Portage la Prairie	Portage la Prairie (North) Airport	PU		Portage Flying Club; Rick Yaskiw	860 ft (260 m)		CJZ2			49°59′33″N 98°18′11″W
Portage la Prairie	Portage la Prairie/Southport Airport	PU		Southport Aerospace Centre Inc.	884 ft (269 m)	CYPG		YPG		49°54′11″N 98°16′26″W
Red Sucker Lake	Red Sucker Lake Airport	PU		Government of Manitoba	747 ft (228 m)	CYRS		YRS		54°10′02″N 93°33′26″W
Red Sucker Lake	Red Sucker Lake Water Aerodrome	PU		Red Sucker Lake Air Service	720 ft (220 m)		CKT4			54°09′17″N 93°33′48″W
Riding Mountain House (Riding Mountain National Park)	Riding Mountain Airport	PR		Roland Kuip	1,016 ft (310 m)		CRM2			50°34′25″N 99°21′41″W
Riverton	Riverton Airport	PU		Town of Riverton	725 ft (221 m)		CKG2			50°58′18″N 97°00′40″W
Roblin	Roblin Airport	PU		Roblin Airport Commission	1,821 ft (555 m)		CKB7			51°14′04″N 101°23′33″W
Roland	Roland (Graham Field) Airport	PR		J.A. Graham	865 ft (264 m)		CKD7			49°24′30″N 97°59′26″W
Rosenort	Rosenort Airport	PR		H. Thiesen	779 ft (237 m)		CKJ2			49°27′11″N 97°25′21″W
Russell	Russell Airport	PU		Russell Flying Club	1,824 ft (556 m)		CJW5			50°45′57″N 101°17′42″W
St. Andrews	Winnipeg/St. Andrews Airport (St. Andrews Airport)	PU		St. Andrews Airport Inc.	759 ft (231 m)	CYAV				50°03′23″N 97°01′57″W
Ste. Anne	Ste-Anne (Hospital) Heliport	PR		Santé Sud-Southern Health	831 ft (253 m)		CHS6			49°40′04″N 96°38′50″W
St. François Xavier	St. François Xavier Airport	PU		Doug Brown	798 ft (243 m)		CKA8			49°55′28″N 97°32′56″W
St-Pierre-Jolys	St-Pierre-Jolys (Carl's Field) Aerodrome	PR		Mike Gauthier	824 ft (251 m)		CPJ6			49°26′10″N 96°55′37″W
St. Theresa Point First Nation	St. Theresa Point Airport	PU		Government of Manitoba	766 ft (233 m)	CYST		YST		53°50′44″N 94°51′07″W
Sand Lakes Provincial Park	Big Sand Lake Airport	PU		Big Sand Lake Lodge	1,050 ft (320 m)		CJQ9			57°37′10″N 99°52′31″W
Selkirk	Selkirk Airport	PR		Riverside Aircraft Maintenance	747 ft (228 m)		CKL2			50°10′20″N 96°52′20″W
Selkirk	Selkirk Water Aerodrome	PR		Riverside Aircraft Maintenance	735 ft (224 m)		CKC5			50°10′00″N 96°52′00″W
Shamattawa First Nation	Shamattawa Airport	PU		Government of Manitoba	296 ft (90 m)	CZTM		ZTM		55°51′56″N 92°04′53″W
Shoal Lake	Shoal Lake Airport	PU		Shoal Lake Airport Authority	1,836 ft (560 m)		CKL5			50°27′27″N 100°36′31″W
Shoal Lake	Shoal Lake Water Aerodrome	PU		Shoal Lake Flying Club	1,800 ft (550 m)		CKB9			50°26′00″N 100°36′00″W
Silver Falls	Silver Falls Airport	PR		Blue Water Aviation	775 ft (236 m)		CKB8			50°30′00″N 96°05′53″W
Silver Falls	Silver Falls Water Aerodrome	PU		Blue Water Aviation Services	755 ft (230 m)		CKJ5			50°30′00″N 96°06′00″W
Snow Lake	Snow Lake Airport	PU		Town of Snow Lake	993 ft (303 m)		CJE4			54°53′50″N 99°49′08″W
Snow Lake	Snow Lake (Gogal) Heliport	PR		Brad Gogal	974 ft (297 m)		CSN5			52°54′48″N 100°00′59″W
Snow Lake	Snow Lake Water Aerodrome	PU		Gogal Air Service	890 ft (270 m)		CKM5			54°53′00″N 100°02′00″W
Somerset	Somerset Aerodrome	PU		Rural Municipality of Lorne	1,563 ft (476 m)		CKC8			49°24′01″N 98°41′33″W
Souris	Souris Glenwood Industrial Air Park	PU		Souris & Glenwood Airport Commission	1,480 ft (450 m)		CJX5			49°38′00″N 100°12′00″W
South Indian Lake	South Indian Lake Airport	PU		Government of Manitoba	951 ft (290 m)	CZSN		XSI		56°47′34″N 98°54′26″W
Starbuck	Starbuck Aerodrome	PU		Winnipeg Gliding Club	785 ft (239 m)		CKJ7			49°42′22″N 97°40′50″W
Steinbach	Steinbach Airport	PU		City of Steinbach	849 ft (259 m)		CJB3			49°33′03″N 96°40′50″W
Steinbach	Steinbach (South) Airport	PR		Harv's Air Service	888 ft (271 m)		CKK7			49°29′38″N 96°41′56″W
Strathclair	Strathclair Airport	PU		Strathclair Airport Commission	1,875 ft (572 m)		CJY5			50°23′46″N 100°25′31″W
Swan River	Swan River Airport	PU		Swan Valley Airport Commission	1,100 ft (340 m)	CZJN		ZJN		52°07′17″N 101°14′04″W
Swan River	Swan River/PVA1 Aerodrome	PR		Prairie Valley Airspray	1,420 ft (430 m)		CSR2			52°10′06″N 101°35′28″W
Tadoule Lake	Tadoule Lake Airport	PU		Government of Manitoba	921 ft (281 m)	CYBQ		XTL		58°42′22″N 98°30′44″W
The Pas	The Pas Airport	PU		Town of The Pas	888 ft (271 m)	CYQD		YQD		53°58′17″N 101°05′28″W
The Pas	The Pas/Grace Lake Airport	PU		Beaver Air Services	873 ft (266 m)		CJR3			53°49′35″N 101°12′19″W
Thicket Portage	Thicket Portage Airport	PU		Government of Manitoba	679 ft (207 m)	CZLQ		YTD		55°19′08″N 97°42′28″W
Thompson	Thompson Airport	PU		Thompson Regional Airport Authority	735 ft (224 m)	CYTH		YTH		55°48′12″N 97°51′45″W
Thompson	Thompson Heliport	PR		Manitoba Hydro	702 ft (214 m)		CKM7			55°42′27″N 97°53′29″W
Thompson	Thompson Water Aerodrome	PU		Wings Over Kississing	596 ft (182 m)		CKD6			55°45′00″N 97°50′00″W
Treherne	Treherne Airport	PU		Boyne Valley Aviation	1,200 ft (370 m)		CKU2			49°37′52″N 98°39′59″W
Treherne	Treherne (South Norfolk Airpark) Aerodrome	PU		Municipality of Norfolk Treherne	1,169 ft (356 m)		CTN6			49°39′35″N 98°39′55″W
Utik Lake	Utik Lake/Dennis G Punches Field Aerodrome	PR		North Haven Resort	675 ft (206 m)		CDP3			55°17′26″N 95°48′11″W
Virden	Virden (Gabrielle Farm) Airport	PU		D. Gabrielle	1,440 ft (440 m)		CKR7			49°47′05″N 100°57′22″W
Virden	Virden/R.J. (Bob) Andrew Field Regional Aerodrome	PU		Town of Virden	1,465 ft (447 m)	CYVD				49°52′42″N 100°54′53″W
Wheatland	Wheatland/Spud Plains Aerodrome	PR		Paul Adriaansen	1,542 ft (470 m)		CRS5			49°59′29″N 100°18′48″W
Winkler	Winkler Aerodrome	PU	CANPASS	City of Winkler	890 ft (270 m)		CKZ7			49°10′14″N 97°55′12″W
Winnipeg	CFB Winnipeg	MI	AOE/M	DND	784 ft (239 m)	CYWG		YWG		49°54′36″N 97°14′24″W
Winnipeg	Winnipeg James Armstrong Richardson International Airport	PU	AOE; AOE/CARGO	Winnipeg Airports Authority	784 ft (239 m)	CYWG		YWG		49°54′36″N 97°14′24″W
Winnipeg	Winnipeg (City of Winnipeg) Heliport	PR		City of Winnipeg	767 ft (234 m)		CWG2			49°54′01″N 97°05′44″W
Winnipeg	Winnipeg (Health Sciences Centre) Heliport	PR		Winnipeg Regional Health Authority	880 ft (270 m)		CWH7			49°54′15″N 97°09′23″W
Woodland	Woodland/Kendall Farm Aerodrome	PR		Timothy Todd Kendall	860 ft (260 m)		CWL4			50°15′18″N 97°36′12″W
Wrong Lake	Wrong Lake Airport	PR		Big Eddies North Country Lodge	840 ft (260 m)		CJG4			52°36′56″N 96°11′06″W
York Factory First Nation	York Landing Airport	PU		Government of Manitoba	623 ft (190 m)	CZAC		ZAC		56°05′23″N 96°05′27″W
Zhoda	Zhoda Airport	PU		D. Kiansky	950 ft (290 m)		CKA4			49°16′51″N 96°30′04″W

== Defunct airports ==
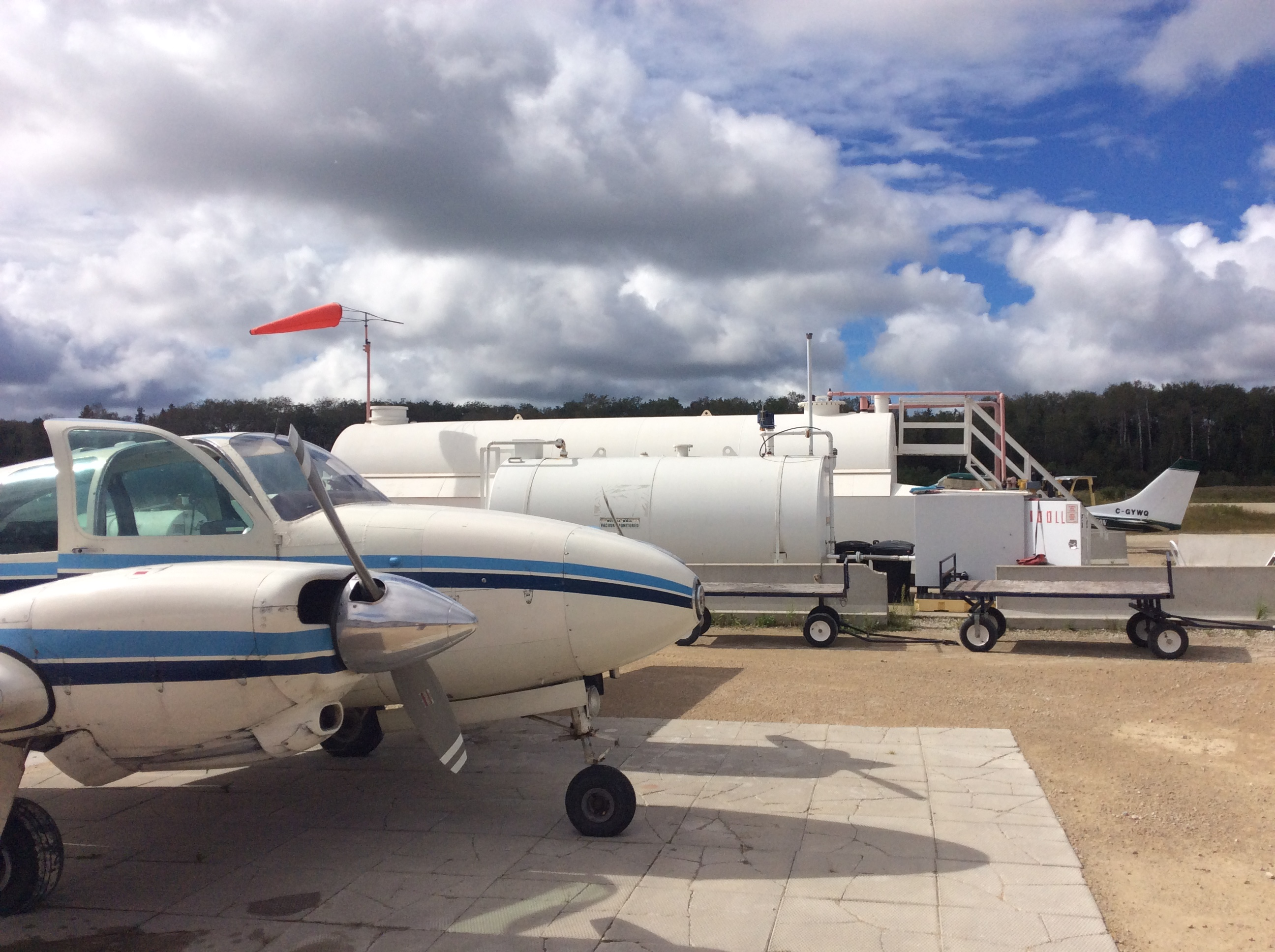
Pine Dock fuel tanks and aircraft

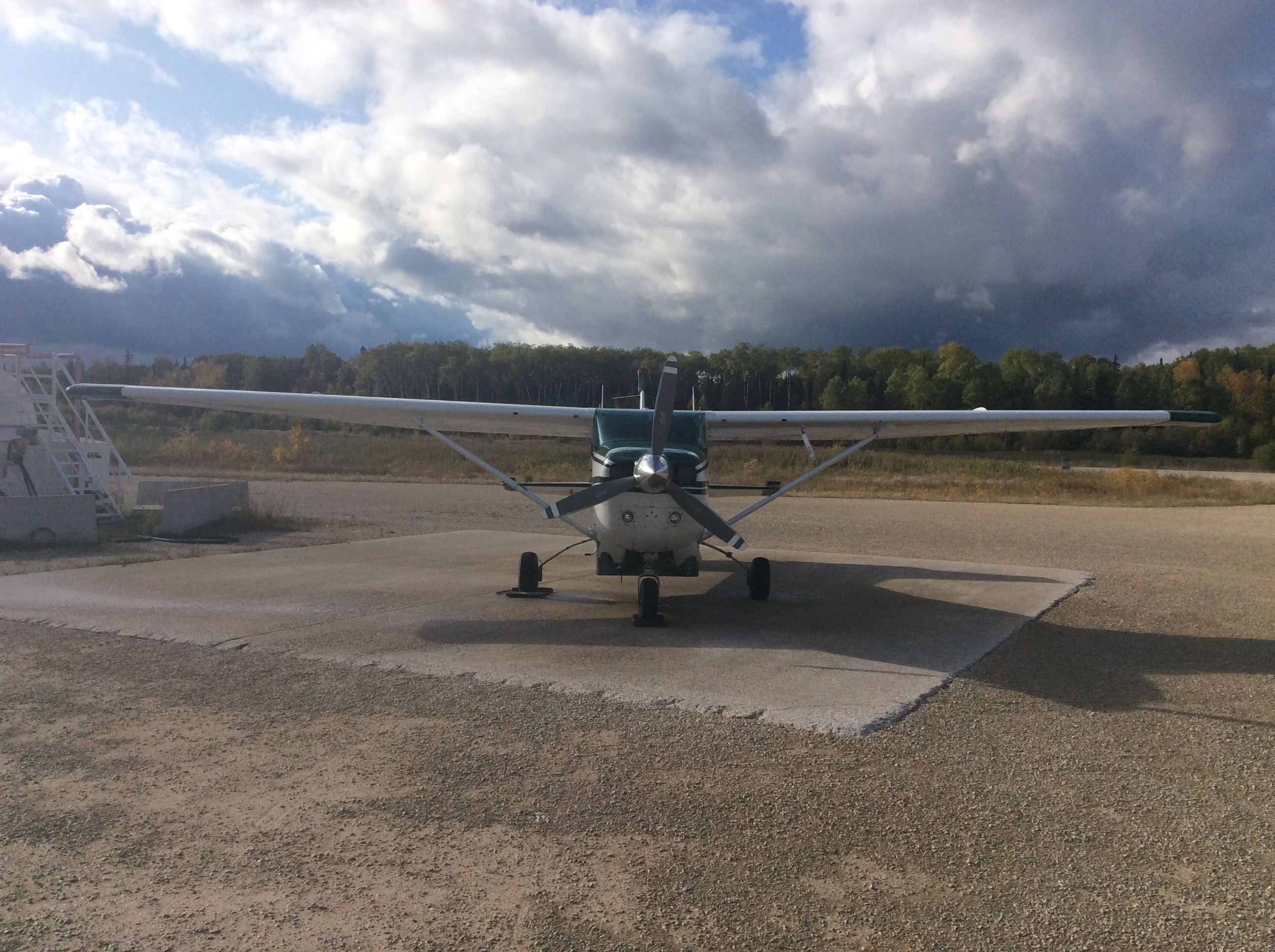
Lakeside Charter Cessna 206 parked on concrete ramp at the Pine Dock Manitoba Airport

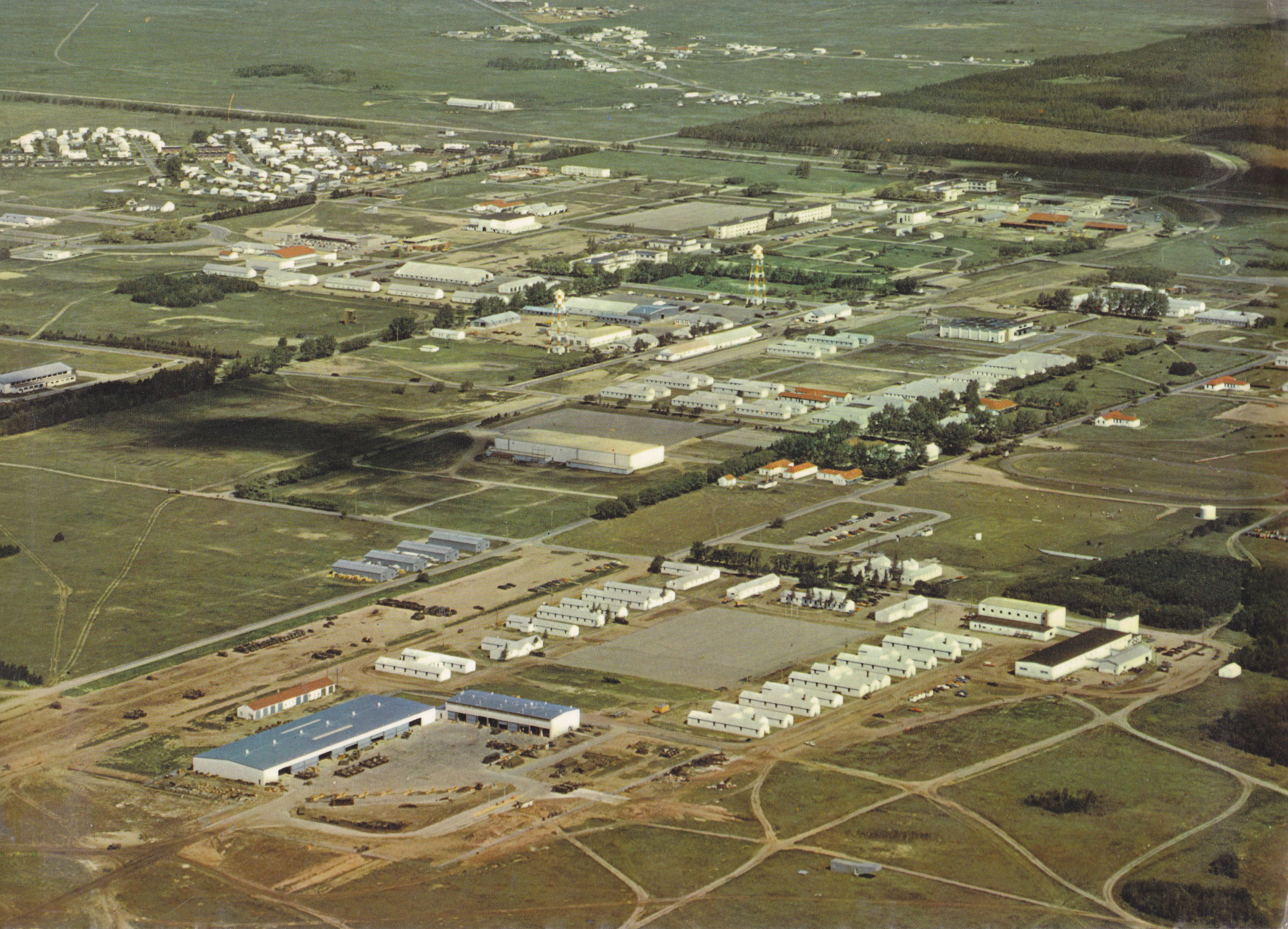
Shilo in 1987

Community	Airport name	ICAO	TC LID	IATA	Coordinates
Arnes	Arnes Airport		CJQ5	YNR	50°50′12″N 096°57′29″W
Beausejour	Beausejour/AV-Ranch Airpark		CAV6	YBR	50°02′28″N 096°35′09″W
Dauphin	RCAF Station Paulson				51°08′00″N 99°52′00″W
Gilbert Plains	Gilbert Plains Airport		CJH2		51°08′00″N 100°30′00″W
Gods Lake Narrows	Gods Lake Narrows Water Aerodrome		CJS8		54°33′00″N 094°28′00″W
Hartney	Hartney Airport		CKT5		49°27′00″N 100°33′00″W
Matheson Island	Matheson Island Airport		CJT2		51°43′56″N 096°56′04″W
Pine Dock	Pine Dock Airport		CKQ9	YPG	51°37′12″N 096°48′39″W
Portage la Prairie	Canadian Forces Base Portage la Prairie				49°54′11″N 098°16′26″W
Mathias Colomb First Nation	Pukatawagen Water Aerodrome		CKP4		55°44′12″N 101°19′37″W
Shilo	Shilo Heliport		CKM3		49°48′00″N 099°38′00″W
Shilo	Shilo (Flewin Field) Heliport		CKN9		49°46′51″N 099°38′20″W
Sainte Rose du Lac	Ste. Rose du Lac Airport		CKR3		51°02′27″N 099°29′43″W
The Pas	The Pas/Grace Lake Water Aerodrome		CKC3		53°49′00″N 101°12′00″W
Virden	Virden (West) Airport		CJZ5		49°53′00″N 101°04′00″W
Wabowden	Wabowden Water Aerodrome		CKK6		54°55′00″N 098°37′00″W
Warren	Woodlands Airport		CKX2		50°09′34″N 097°35′28″W

== See also ==
- List of airports in the Winnipeg area
