= Ilford, Manitoba =

Indian settlement in Manitoba, Canada

Ilford
- Indian settlement
- Boundaries of Ilford

- Location within Manitoba
- Coordinates: 56°03′53″N 95°36′25″W
- Country: Canada
- Province: Manitoba
- Region: NorMan

Area
  - Land: 15.69 km^{2} (6.06 sq mi)

Population (2016)
  - Total: 106
  - Density: 6.8/km^{2} (18/sq mi)

Ilford is an Indian settlement in northern Manitoba, Canada. The Mooseocoot Indian reserve is located within the community boundary and is populated by the War Lake First Nation.

Ilford is 180 m (590 ft) above sea level.

== Demographics ==
In the 2011 Census, Ilford had a population of 43 living in 11 of its 11 total private dwellings.

In the 2021 Census, Ilford had a population of 62 living in 11 of its 11 total private dwellings (a 44.186% increase in 6 years). With the average age of all residents being 43.2, men 24.6 and women 45.2. The average household size is about 3.4 with a total of 15 couple families.

== Services ==
The community provides the following services:

- fire protection by a volunteer fire department with pumper truck,
- Royal Canadian Mounted Police (RCMP)
- Community Health Worker
- Ilford Airport
- Via Rail's Winnipeg-Churchill train serves passengers
- Power provided by Manitoba Hydro
- Telephone service provided by Manitoba Telecom Services
- Chlorinated and filtered water service (sourced from Moose Nose Lake)
- Sewage treatment plant (installed in 1994)
- Julie Lindal School (including Gymnasium)
- Multi-purpose building
- Skating rink
- Gold Trail Hotel
