= RCAF Station Dauphin =

- Rural Municipality of Dauphin, Manitoba; Near Dauphin, Manitoba in Canada

Site information
- Operator: Formerly Royal Canadian Air Force

Location
- Coordinates: 51°06′N 100°03′W

Site history
- Built by: P.W. Graham & Sons
- In use: 1941-5
- Fate: Converted to civilian airport

Garrison information
- Occupants: No. 10 Service Flying Training School(S.F.T.S.) (1941-1945)

Airfield information
- Identifiers: IATA: none, ICAO: none
- Elevation: 990 ft (300 m) AMSL
Runways
Direction	Length and surface
14L/32R	2,700 ft (820 m) Hard Surface
14R/32L	2,700 ft (820 m) Hard Surface
2L/26R	2,610 ft (800 m) Hard Surface
2R/26L	2,610 ft (800 m) Hard Surface
8L/26R	2,720 ft (830 m) Hard Surface
8R/26L	2,720 ft (830 m) Hard Surface

RCAF Station Dauphin was a Second World War British Commonwealth Air Training Plan (BCATP) station located near Dauphin, Manitoba, Canada. It was operated and administered by the Royal Canadian Air Force (RCAF). The Station was home to No. 10 Service Flying Training School(S.F.T.S.) from 5 Mar 1941-14 Apr 1945.

The aerodrome is now the Lt. Col W.G. (Billy) Barker VC Airport.

== History ==
A site was selected for construction of a training aerodrome south of the community of Dauphin, Manitoba. The total cost of construction of the facility was approximately one million dollars. Building construction was completed by P.W. Graham & Sons, of Moose Jaw, Saskatchewan for $337,214 and plumbing work at the site was completed by F.W. Bumstead of Dauphin for $50,000. No. 10 Service Flying Training School was established at the base on 5 March 1941, but the official opening of the school was not held until 15 April of the same year. The school was disbanded on 15 April 1945 and the airport was decommissioned by the RCAF after the war.

== Aerodrome data ==
In approximately 1942 the aerodrome was listed as RCAF Aerodrome - Dauphin, Manitoba at 51°06′N 100°03′W with a variation of 14 degrees east and elevation of 990 ft (300 m). Six runways were listed as follows:

Runway Name	Length	Width	Surface
14L/32R	2,700 ft (820 m)	100 ft (30 m)	Hard surfaced
14R/32L	2,700 ft (820 m)	100 ft (30 m)	Hard surfaced
2L/20R	2,610 ft (800 m)	100 ft (30 m)	Hard surfaced
2R/20L	2,610 ft (800 m)	100 ft (30 m)	Hard surfaced
8L/26R	2,720 ft (830 m)	100 ft (30 m)	Hard surfaced
8R/26L	2,720 ft (830 m)	100 ft (30 m)	Hard surfaced

== Relief Landing Field - Valley River ==
In approximately 1942 the aerodrome was listed as RCAF Aerodrome - Valley River, Manitoba at 51°13′N 100°13′W with a variation of 14 degrees east and elevation of 1,018 ft (310 m). The field is listed as an "All way field" with three runways as follows:

Runway Name	Length	Width	Surface
2/20	3,400 ft (1,000 m)	----	Turf
13/31	3,400 ft (1,000 m)	----	Turf
8/26	3,400 ft (1,000 m)	----	Turf

== Relief Landing Field - North Junction ==
In approximately 1942 the aerodrome was listed as RCAF Aerodrome - North Junction, Manitoba at 51°13′N 100°05′W with a variation of 14 degrees east and elevation of 980 ft (300 m). The field is listed as an "All way field" with three runways as follows:

Runway Name	Length	Width	Surface
8/26	3,030 ft (920 m)	1,000 ft (300 m)	Turf
1/19	2,910 ft (890 m)	1,000 ft (300 m)	Turf
13/31	2,940 ft (900 m)	1,000 ft (300 m)	Turf
