= Berens River Airport =

Airport in Manitoba, Canada

- IATA: YBV; ICAO: CYBV; WMO: 71859

Summary
- Airport type: Public
- Operator: Government of Manitoba
- Location: Berens River First Nation, Manitoba
- Time zone: CST (UTC−06:00)
  - Summer (DST): CDT (UTC−05:00)
- Elevation AMSL: 729 ft / 222 m
- Coordinates: 52°21′32″N 097°01′05″W

Map
- Location in Manitoba CYBV (Canada)

Runways
Direction	Length		Surface
Direction	ft	m	Surface
09/27	2,888	880	Crushed rock

Statistics (2010)
- Aircraft movements: 2,096
- Source: Canada Flight Supplement; Movements from Statistics Canada

Berens River Airport (IATA: YBV, ICAO: CYBV) is located adjacent to the mouth of Berens River, Manitoba, Canada and serves the Berens River First Nation. The airport serves several small local airlines including Kitchi Airways, Northway Aviation, Lakeside Aviation, and Perimeter Aviation. There are six flights a week to and from Winnipeg via Perimeter Aviation.

== Airlines and destinations ==
Airlines	Destinations
Amik Aviation	Winnipeg/St. Andrews
Northway Aviation	Bloodvein, Winnipeg/St. Andrews
Perimeter Aviation	Winnipeg

== See also ==
- List of airports in Manitoba
