= Bloodvein River Airport =

Airport in Manitoba, Canada

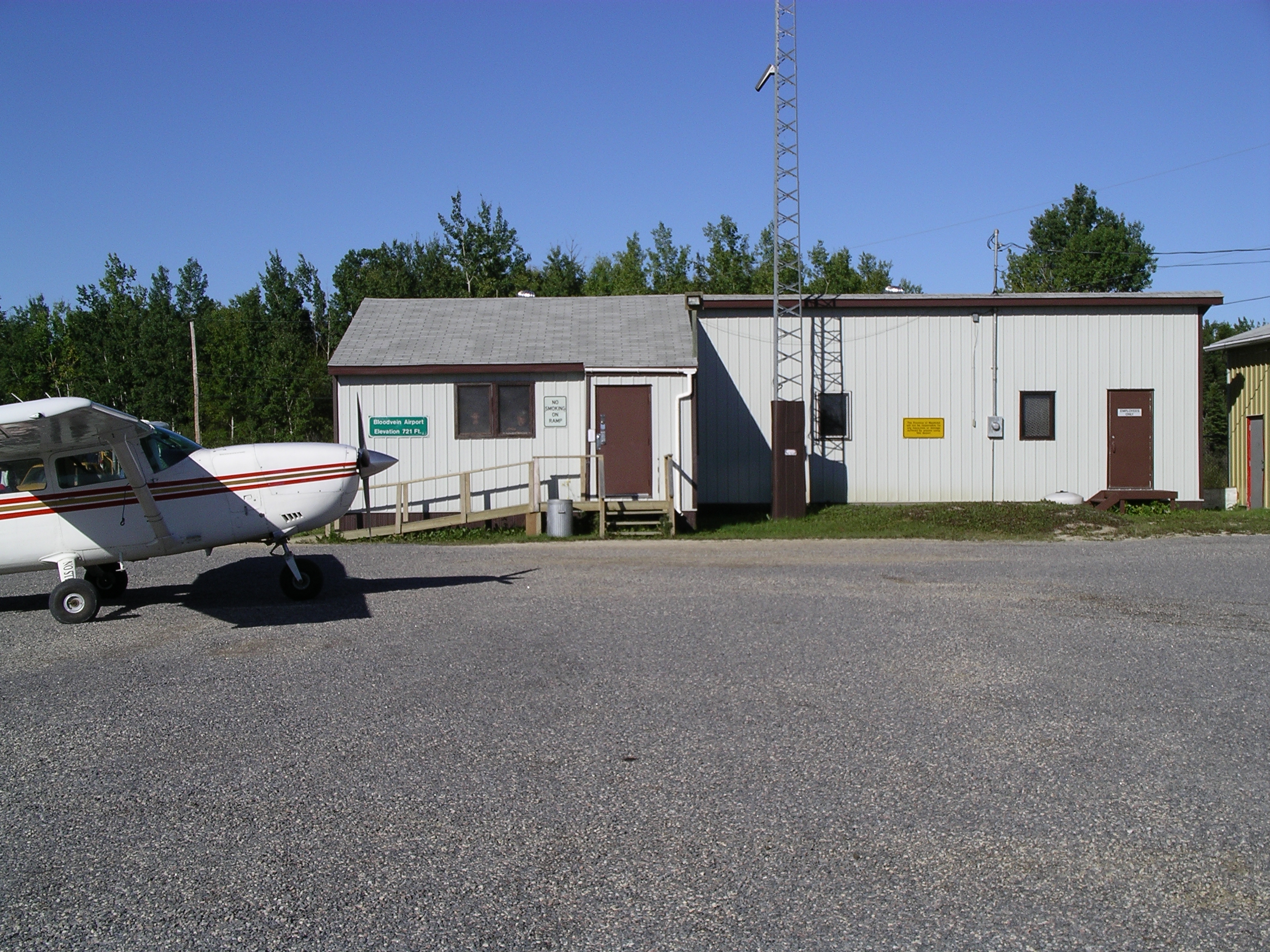
- Charter flights are the main user of the airport
- IATA: YDV; ICAO: CZTA

Summary
- Airport type: Public
- Operator: Government of Manitoba
- Serves: Bloodvein First Nation
- Location: Bloodvein River, Manitoba
- Time zone: CST (UTC−06:00)
  - Summer (DST): CDT (UTC−05:00)
- Elevation AMSL: 729 ft / 222 m
- Coordinates: 51°47′04″N 096°41′32″W

Map
- Location in Manitoba CZTA (Canada)

Runways
| Direction | Length | | Surface |
| Direction | ft | m | Surface |
|---|---|---|---|
| 18/36 | 2,995 | 913 | Crushed rock |

Statistics (2010)
- Aircraft movements: 2,100
- Source: Canada Flight Supplement; Movements from Statistics Canada

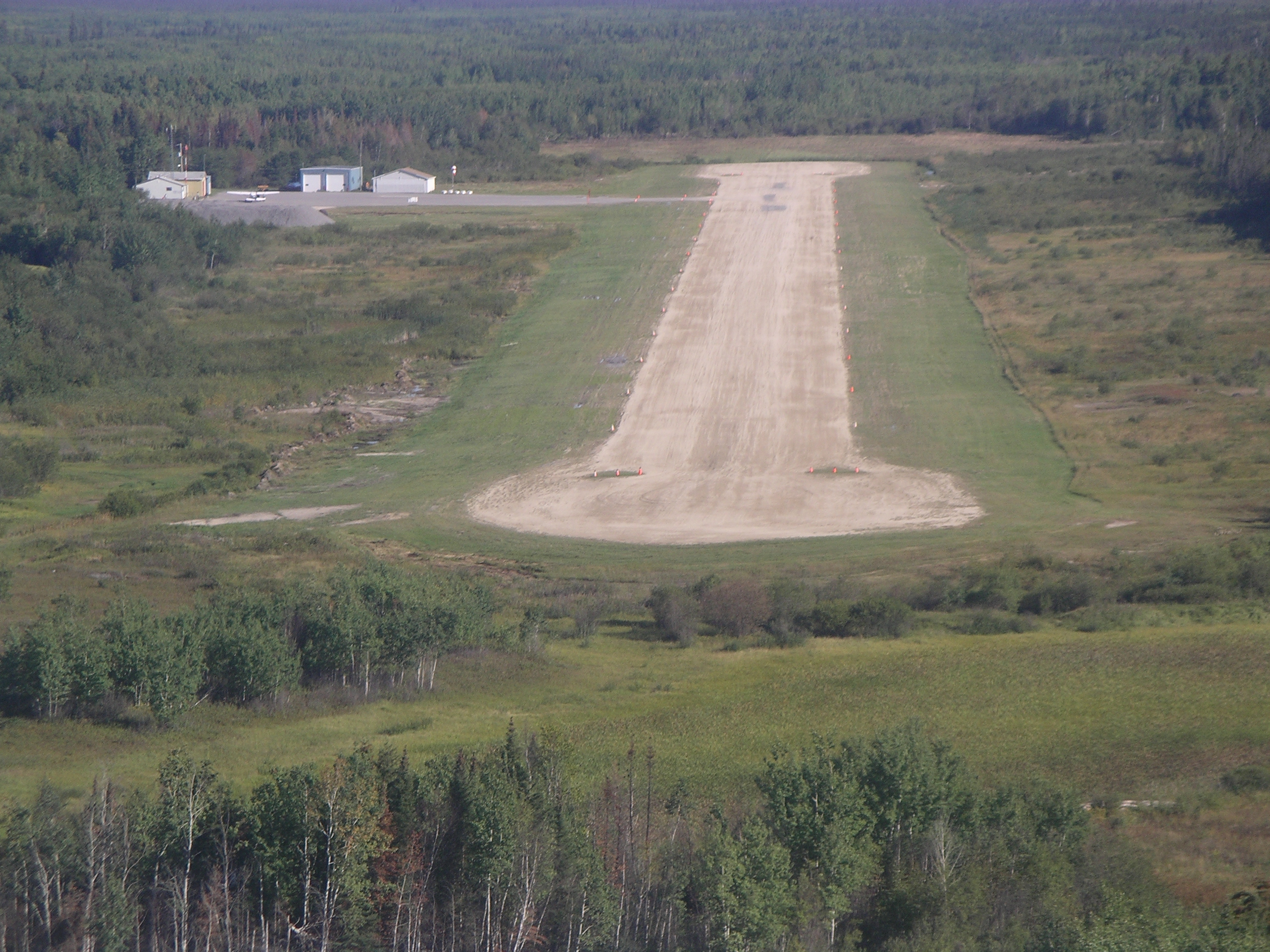
On short final

Bloodvein River Airport (IATA: YDV, ICAO: CZTA) is located adjacent to Bloodvein River, Manitoba, Canada and serves the Bloodvein First Nation.

== Airlines and destinations ==
| Airlines | Destinations |
|---|---|
| Amik Aviation | Winnipeg/St. Andrews |
| Northway Aviation | Berens River, Winnipeg/St. Andrews |

== See also ==
- List of airports in Manitoba
