= Kelsey, Manitoba =

Canadian locality

Coordinates: 56°02′23″N 96°32′29″W

Kelsey is a locality south of Split Lake, Manitoba, on the Nelson River. It has a strong association with the hydro electric generation in the area. It is served by Kelsey Airport (IATA code KES) and the Hudson Bay Railway (reporting mark HBRY).
