= Gods Lake Airport =

Airport in Manitoba, Canada

- IATA: none; ICAO: none; TC LID: CJB6

Summary
- Airport type: Public
- Owner/Operator: Gods Lake Haven
- Location: Gods Lake
- Time zone: CST (UTC−06:00)
  - Summer (DST): CDT (UTC−05:00)
- Elevation AMSL: 605 ft / 184 m
- Coordinates: 54°46′45″N 093°43′01″W
- Website: www.godslakelodge.com

Map
- Location in Manitoba CJB6 (Canada)

Runways
Direction	Length		Surface
Direction	ft	m	Surface
16/34	2,700	823	Gravel/sand
- Source: Canada Flight Supplement

Gods Lake Airport (TC LID: CJB6) is located 0.5 nautical miles (0.93 km; 0.58 mi) east of Gods Lake, Manitoba, Canada.

== Airlines and destinations ==
Airlines	Destinations
Northway Aviation	Winnipeg/St. Andrews

== See also ==
- List of airports in Manitoba
