= Gods Lake Narrows Airport =

Airport in Manitoba, Canada

- IATA: YGO; ICAO: CYGO

Summary
- Airport type: Public
- Operator: Government of Manitoba
- Location: Gods Lake Narrows, Manitoba
- Time zone: CST (UTC−06:00)
  - Summer (DST): CDT (UTC−05:00)
- Elevation AMSL: 617 ft / 188 m
- Coordinates: 54°33′30″N 094°29′27″W

Map
- Location in Manitoba CYGO (Canada)

Runways
Direction	Length		Surface
Direction	ft	m	Surface
14/32	3,810	1,161	Crushed rock

Statistics (2010)
- Aircraft movements: 1,532
- Source: Canada Flight Supplement; Movements from Statistics Canada

Gods Lake Narrows Airport (IATA: YGO, ICAO: CYGO) is located adjacent to Gods Lake Narrows, Manitoba, Canada.

== Airlines and destinations ==
These are the airlines which have serviced this airport in the past year, as of January 2026:

Airlines	Destinations
Northway Aviation	Winnipeg/St. Andrews
Bearskin Airlines	Thompson, Winnipeg

== See also ==
- List of airports in Manitoba
- Gods Lake Narrows Water Aerodrome
