= Manto Sipi Cree Nation =

Manto Sipi Cree Nation God's River ᒪᓂᑐ ᓰᐱᐩ manito sîpiy
- Indian reserve
- God's River 86A
- Location of God's Lake in Manitoba
- Coordinates: 54°50′11″N 94°03′23″W
- Country: Canada
- Province: Manitoba
- Region: Northern

Government
  - MP (Churchill—Keewatinook Aski): Rebecca Chartrand (Liberal)
  - MLA (Keewatinook): Ian Bushie (NDP)

Area
  - Total: 4.01 km^{2} (1.55 sq mi)
- Elevation: 170 m (560 ft)

Population (2016)
  - Total: 643
  - Density: 160.2/km^{2} (415/sq mi)
- Time zone: UTC-6 (CST)
  - Summer (DST): UTC-5 (CDT)
- Postal code: R0B 0N0
- Website: https://mantosipicree.ca

Gods River is a remote, isolated settlement in Northern Manitoba, Canada, and the primary settlement of the Manto Sipi Cree Nation (Cree: ᒪᓂᑐ ᓰᐱᐩ, manito sîpiy) (54°50′15″N 94°03′17″W) First Nations community. The settlement is on Gods Lake at the point of outflow of the Gods River.

The community can only be reached by winter road or by air via Gods Lake Airport.

The official languages of the community are English and Cree. There is a lodge for tourists to stay for visits to the community. Population is approximately 400-700 community members as of 2021.

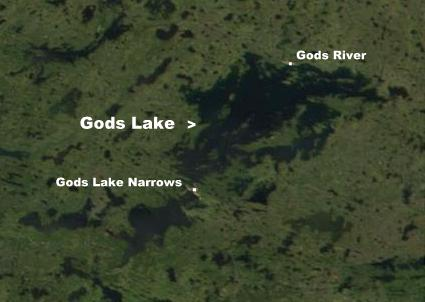
Gods River on Gods Lake
