= Nejanilini Lake =

Lake in Manitoba, Canada

- Location of the lake in Manitoba Nejanilini Lake (Canada)
- Location: Division No. 23, North Manitoba
- Coordinates: 59°37′N 97°43′W
- Basin countries: Canada
- Settlements: None

Nejanilini Lake is a lake in northern Manitoba, near the provincial border with Nunavut, Canada.

== See also ==
- List of lakes of Manitoba
