= St. Theresa Point Airport =

Airport in Manitoba, Canada

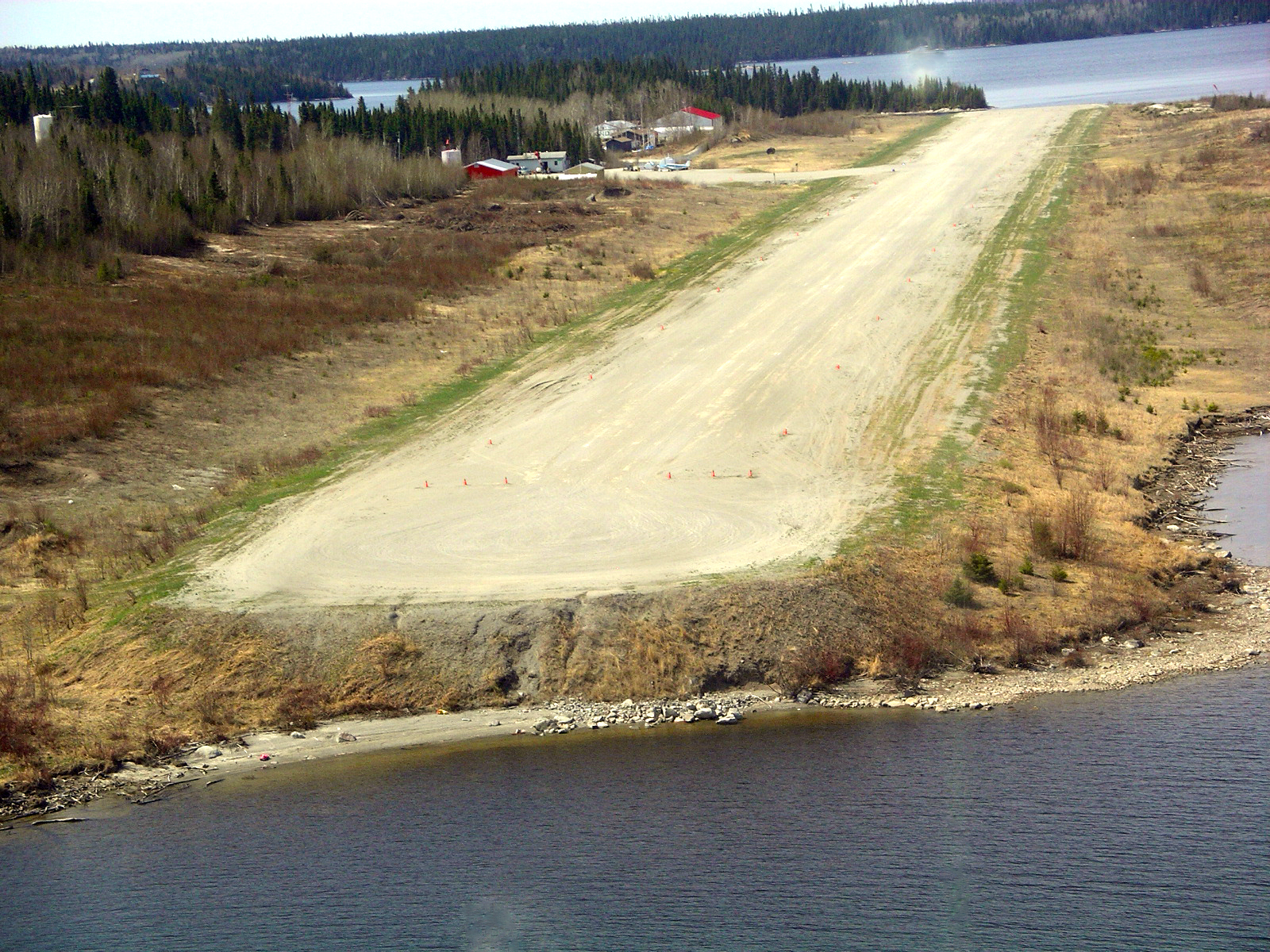
- Threshold of runway 22

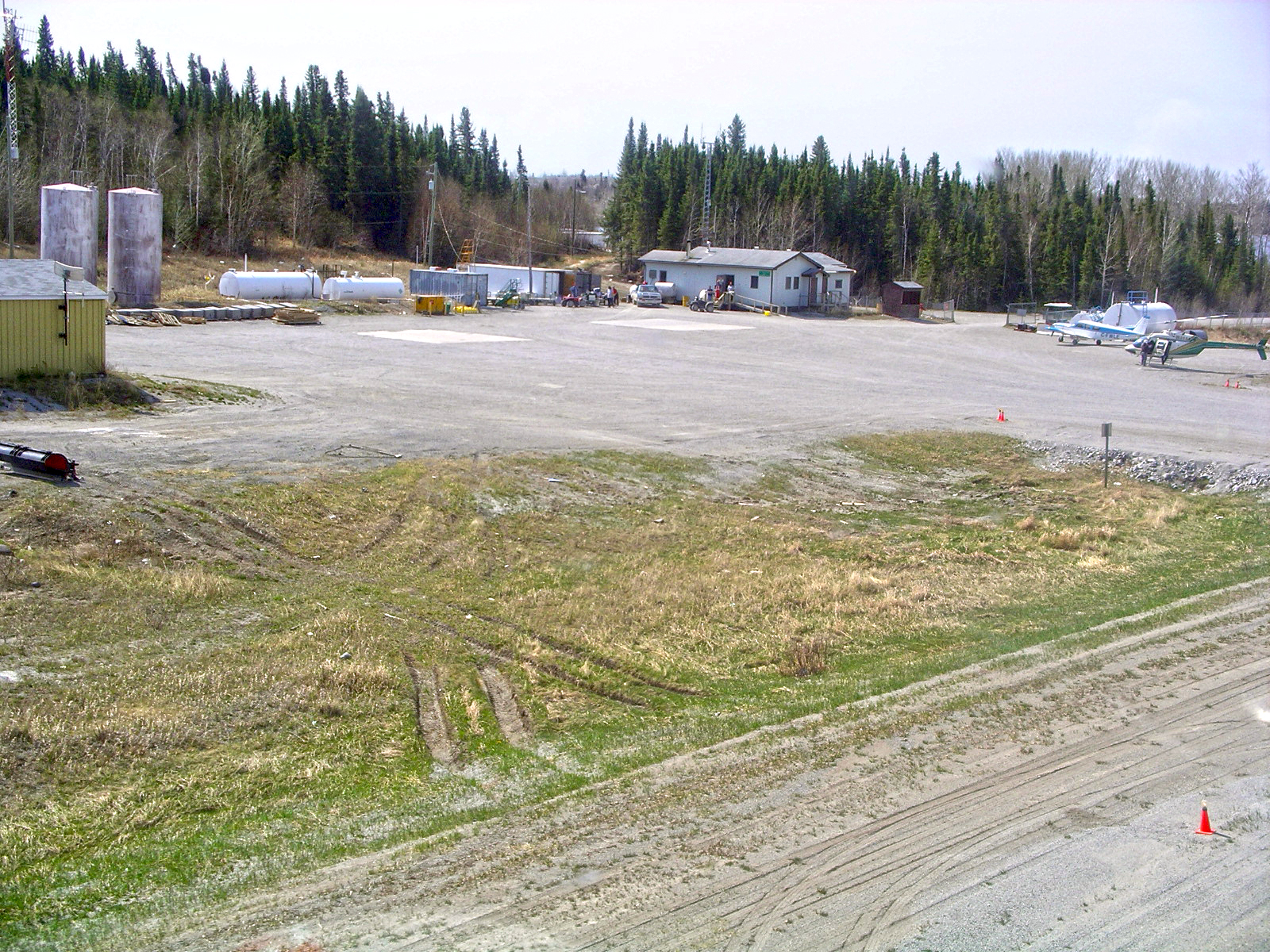
- St. Theresa terminal building
- IATA: YST; ICAO: CYST

Summary
- Airport type: Public
- Operator: Government of Manitoba
- Location: St. Theresa Point, Manitoba
- Time zone: CST (UTC−06:00)
  - Summer (DST): CDT (UTC−05:00)
- Elevation AMSL: 766 ft (233 m)
- Coordinates: 53°50′44″N 094°51′08″W

Map
- Location in Manitoba CYST (Canada)

Runways
Direction	Length		Surface
Direction	ft	m	Surface
04/22	3,393	1,034	Crushed rock

Statistics (2010)
- Aircraft movements: 11,131
- Source: Canada Flight Supplement; Movements from Statistics Canada

St. Theresa Point Airport (IATA: YST, ICAO: CYST) is located on St Mary Island that is 0.8 nautical miles (1.5 km; 0.92 mi) north of St. Theresa Point, Manitoba, Canada.

== Airlines and destinations ==
Airlines	Destinations
Northway Aviation	Garden Hill, Winnipeg/St. Andrews
Perimeter Aviation	Winnipeg

== See also ==
- List of airports in Manitoba
