= Winnipeg/St. Andrews Airport =

Airport in Manitoba, Canada

Winnipeg/St. Andrews Airport St. Andrews Airport
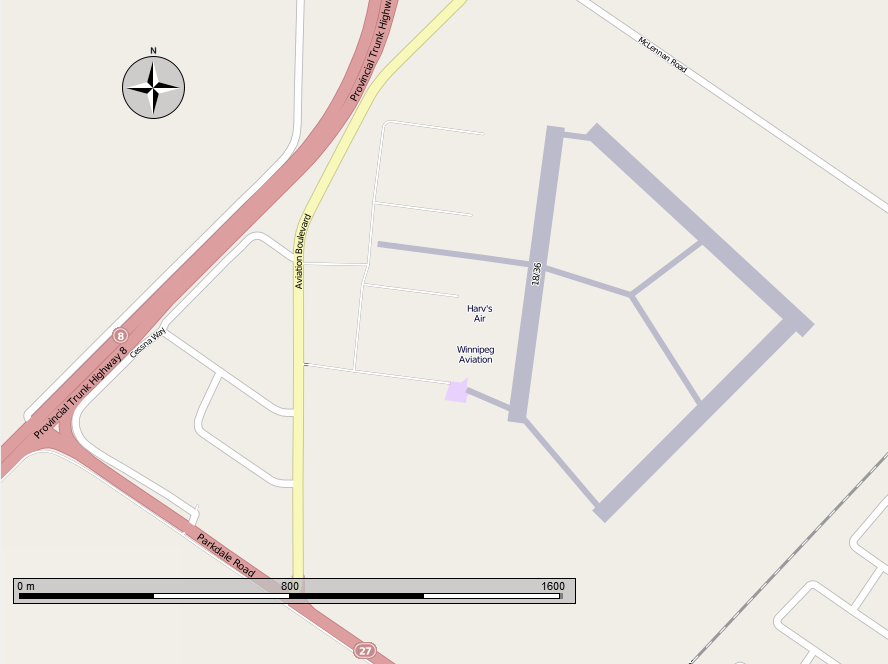
- IATA: none; ICAO: CYAV

Summary
- Airport type: Public
- Operator: St. Andrews Airport Inc.
- Serves: Winnipeg Manitoba
- Location: St. Andrews, Manitoba
- Hub for: Northway Aviation; Amik Aviation
- Time zone: CST (UTC−06:00)
  - Summer (DST): CDT (UTC−05:00)
- Elevation AMSL: 759 ft / 231 m
- Coordinates: 50°03′23″N 097°01′57″W
- Website: https://www.standrewsairport.ca/

Map
- Location in Manitoba CYAV (Canada)

Runways
Direction	Length		Surface
Direction	ft	m	Surface
04/22	2,852	869	Asphalt
13/31	3,002	915	Asphalt
18/36	3,000	914	Asphalt

Statistics (2011)
- Aircraft movements: 104,055
- Sources: Canada Flight Supplement; Movements from Statistics Canada

Winnipeg/St. Andrews Airport or St. Andrews Airport (ICAO: CYAV) is a general aviation facility located 10 nautical miles (19 km; 12 mi) north-northeast of Winnipeg, in the Rural Municipality of St. Andrews, Manitoba, Canada. In 2022 it was Canada's 11th busiest airport by aircraft movements.

St. Andrews Airport is primarily used for commercial operations, particularly flight training, air charters, scheduled passenger service, and air ambulances.

Scheduled passenger service is primarily provided by Northway Aviation which operates routes to small communities in Northern Manitoba.

Nav Canada provides air traffic control services at St. Andrews Airport and the surrounding area.

== Airlines and destinations ==
Airlines	Destinations
Amik Aviation	Berens River, Bloodvein River, Little Grand Rapids, Poplar Hill
Northway Aviation	Berens River, Bloodvein River, Deer Lake (ON), Garden Hill, Gods Lake, Gods Lake Narrows, Little Grand Rapids, Oxford House, Poplar Hill, Poplar River, Red Sucker Lake, St. Theresa Point, Sandy Lake

== Ground transportation ==
St. Andrews's roads access Manitoba Highway 27 to the south, and Manitoba Provincial Road 230 to the north, which serves as a short 200 m (660 ft) access road to Manitoba Highway 8, which leads south to Winnipeg.

== See also ==
- List of airports in Manitoba
- List of airports in the Winnipeg area
