= Little Grand Rapids Airport =

Airport in Manitoba, Canada

- IATA: ZGR; ICAO: CZGR

Summary
- Airport type: Public
- Operator: Government of Manitoba
- Location: Little Grand Rapids, Manitoba
- Time zone: CST (UTC−06:00)
  - Summer (DST): CDT (UTC−05:00)
- Elevation AMSL: 1,008 ft / 307 m
- Coordinates: 52°02′42″N 095°27′58″W

Map
- Location in Manitoba CZGR (Canada)

Runways
Direction	Length		Surface
Direction	ft	m	Surface
18/36	2,798	853	Crushed rock

Statistics (2010)
- Aircraft movements: 2,871
- Source: Canada Flight Supplement; Movements from Statistics Canada.

Little Grand Rapids Airport (IATA: ZGR, ICAO: CZGR) is the airport serving the First Nations communities of Little Grand Rapids and the nearby Pauingassi First Nation, Manitoba, Canada. These two communities are connected to the more populated southern areas of Manitoba by a winter road which is only operational for about two months per year. During the other 10 months, this airport is the only practical way move passengers and goods in and out of the communities. The lack of roads and small size of aircraft, typically Otters, Grand Caravans or similar, makes it relatively busy compared to the population of roughly 1,500 served by the airport.

This airport in Manitoba is operated by the Manitoba Transportation & Government Services — Northern Airports & Marine Operations.

Its NDB beacon is 280 - 4B.

== Airlines and destinations ==
Airlines	Destinations
Adventure Air	Winnipeg/St. Andrews
Amik Aviation	Winnipeg/St. Andrews
Harv's Air	Winnipeg/St. Andrews
Northway Aviation	Winnipeg/St. Andrews
SkyNorth Air	Winnipeg

== See also ==
- List of airports in Manitoba
