= Gillam Airport =

Airport in Manitoba, Canada

- IATA: YGX; ICAO: CYGX; WMO: 71912

Summary
- Airport type: Public
- Operator: Town of Gillam
- Location: Gillam, Manitoba
- Time zone: CST (UTC−06:00)
  - Summer (DST): CDT (UTC−05:00)
- Elevation AMSL: 476 ft / 145 m
- Coordinates: 56°21′28″N 094°42′39″W

Map
- Location in Manitoba CYGX (Canada)

Runways
Direction	Length		Surface
Direction	ft	m	Surface
05/23	5,034	1,534	Gravel

Statistics (2010)
- Aircraft movements: 3,442
- Source: Canada Flight Supplement; Environment Canada; Movements from Statistics Canada

Gillam Airport (IATA: YGX, ICAO: CYGX) is located adjacent to Gillam, Manitoba, Canada.

== Airlines and destinations ==
Airlines	Destinations
Calm Air	Churchill, Thompson, Winnipeg

== See also ==
- List of airports in Manitoba
- Gillam Water Aerodrome
