= Calm Air =

Regional airline of Canada servicing northern Manitoba and Nunavut

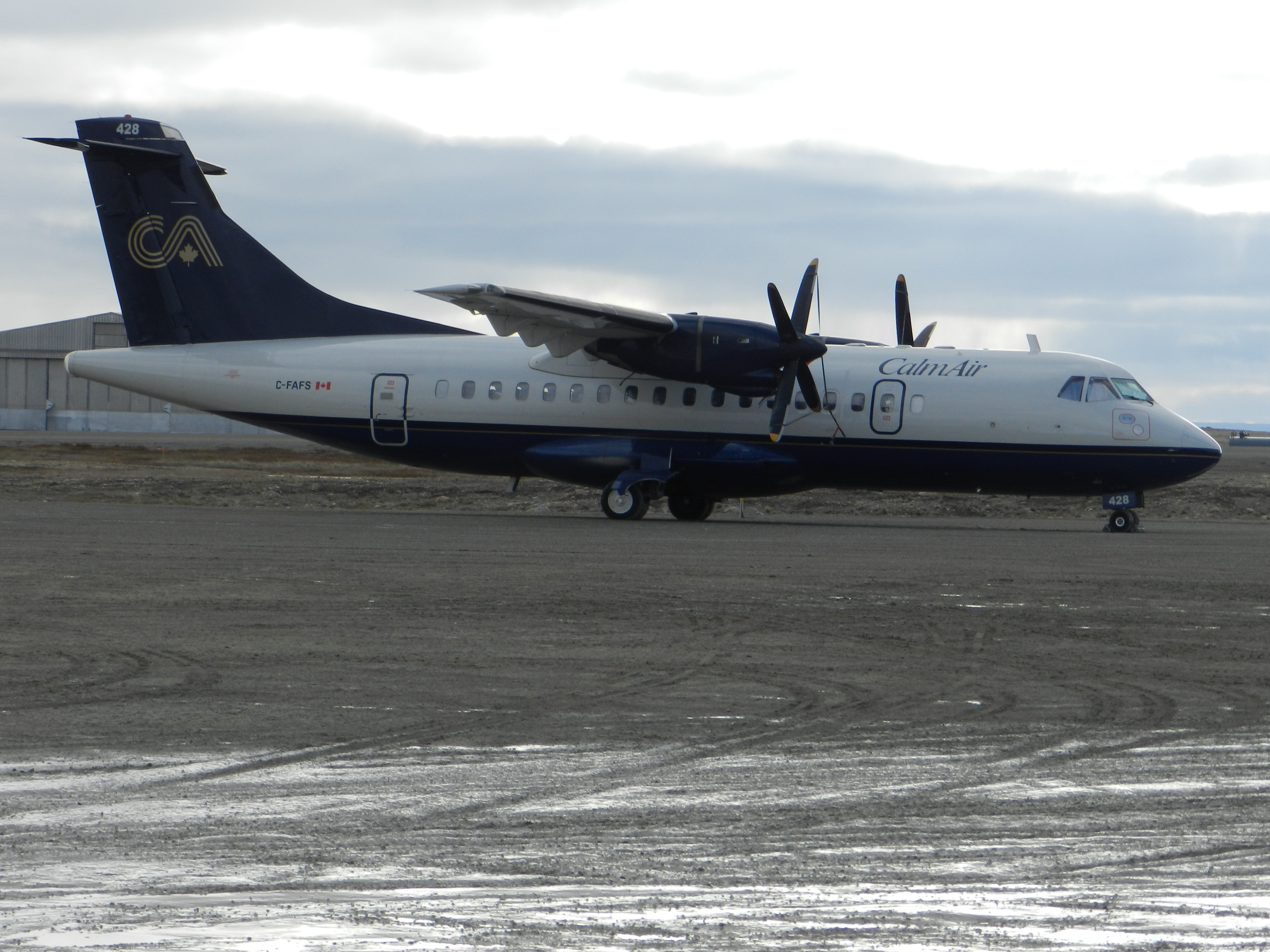
- An ATR 42 at Cambridge Bay Airport
IATA	ICAO	Call sign
MO	CAV	CALM AIR
- Founded: 1962; 64 years ago
- AOC #: Canada: 1487; United States: MHMF437G
- Hubs: Thompson; Winnipeg
- Focus cities: Churchill; Rankin Inlet
- Frequent-flyer program: Aeroplan Calm Rewards
- Fleet size: 15
- Destinations: 14
- Parent company: Exchange Income Corporation
- Headquarters: Winnipeg, Manitoba, Canada
- Website: www.calmair.com

Calm Air International LP. is a full service airline, offering passenger, charter and freight services in northern Manitoba and the Kivalliq Region of Nunavut. It is owned by Exchange Income Corporation with its main base in Winnipeg, Manitoba.

== History ==
The airline was established and started operations in 1962. It was founded by Carl Arnold Lawrence Morberg (1936-2005) and his wife, Gail, as a charter service in northern Saskatchewan. In 1976 it took over the Transair passenger service in the Northwest Territories. In 1981, Calm Air took over many of the passenger and cargo routes of Lamb Air. Canadian Airlines acquired a 45% holding in Calm Air in 1987.

On April 8, 2009 Calm Air was purchased by the Exchange Income Corporation (EIC) which also owns Perimeter Aviation, PAL Airlines, Bearskin Airlines, Custom Helicopters and Keewatin Air.

== Airline partnerships ==
Calm Air has a codeshare agreement with Canadian North. Canadian North operates flights on the Winnipeg-Rankin Inlet route on behalf of Calm Air.

== Destinations ==
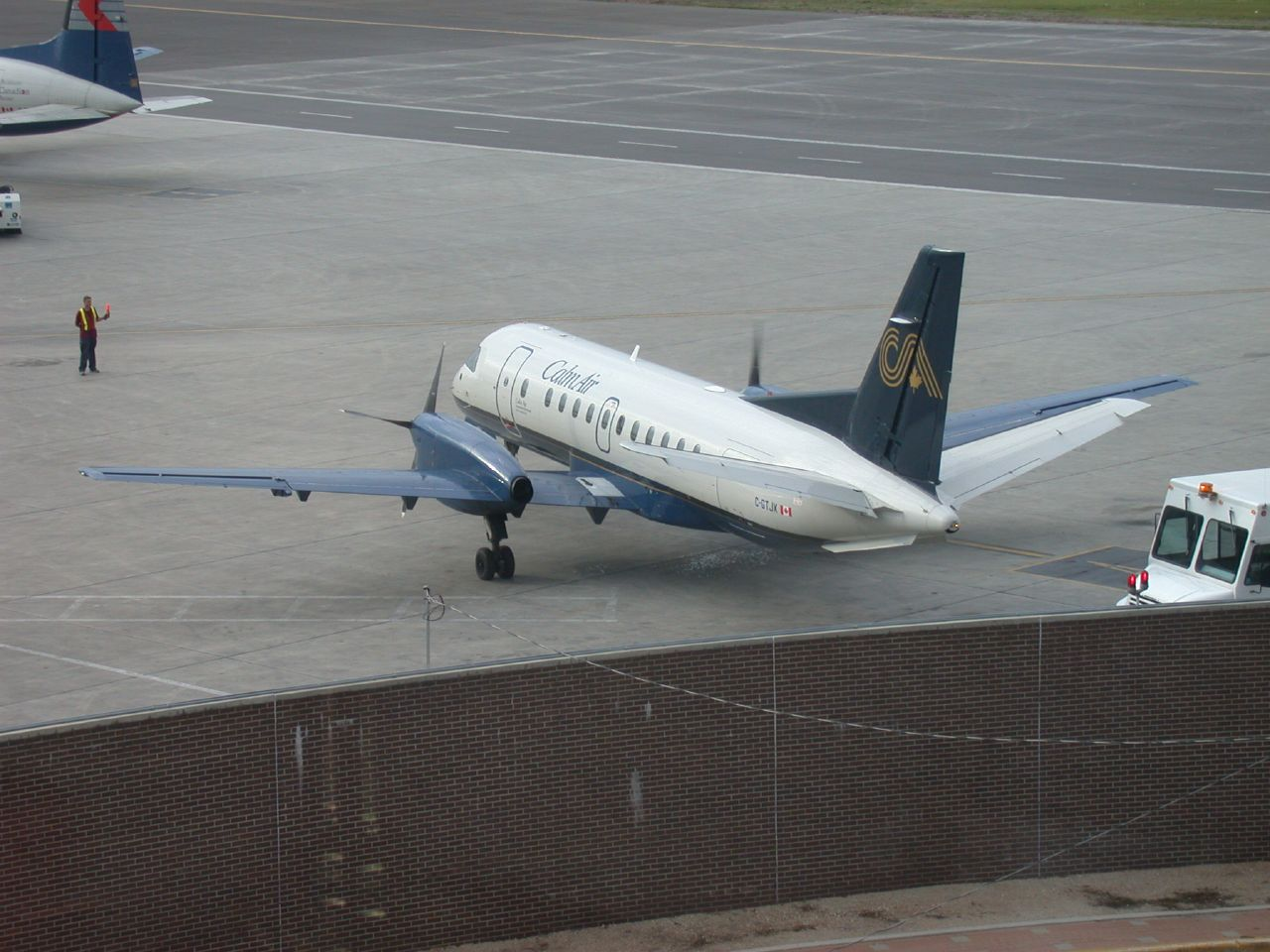
A Saab 340 operated by Calm Air in 2007

As of January 2023, Calm Air operates daily scheduled air services to the following communities:

- Manitoba
  - Churchill (Churchill Airport)
  - Flin Flon (Flin Flon Airport)
  - Gillam (Gillam Airport)
  - The Pas (The Pas Airport)
  - Thompson (Thompson Airport)
  - Winnipeg (Winnipeg James Armstrong Richardson International Airport)
- Nunavut
  - Arviat (Arviat Airport)
  - Baker Lake (Baker Lake Airport)
  - Chesterfield Inlet (Chesterfield Inlet Airport)
  - Coral Harbour (Coral Harbour Airport)
  - Naujaat (Naujaat Airport)
  - Rankin Inlet (Rankin Inlet Airport)
  - Sanikiluaq (Sanikiluaq Airport)
  - Whale Cove (Whale Cove Airport)

== Fleet ==
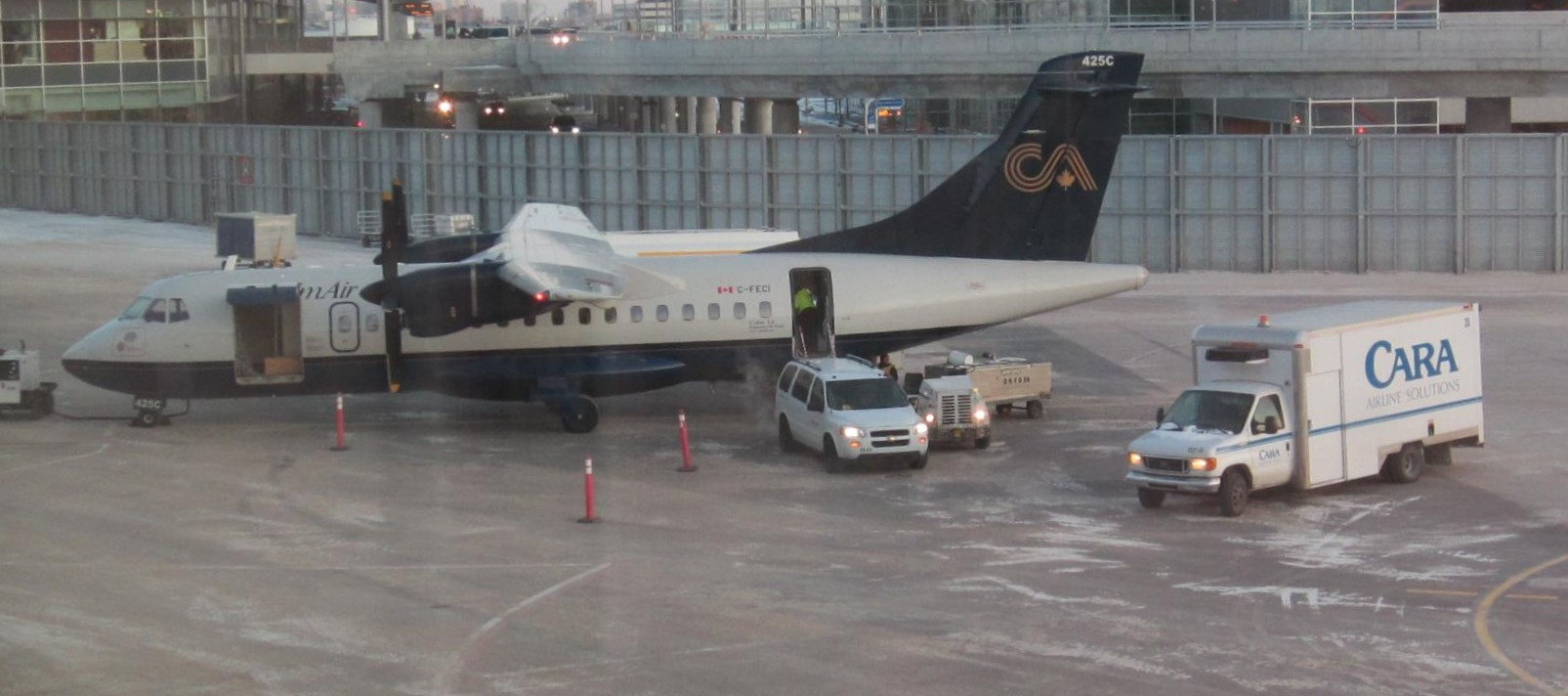
Calm Air ATR 42 at Winnipeg airport

As of August 2025, the following aircraft are listed by Transport Canada as being registered to Calm Air:

Calm Air fleet
Aircraft	No. of aircraft	Variants	Notes
Aérospatiale ATR 42	5	ATR 42-300, ATR 42-320	Two 300 series and Three 320 series. 22, 34 or 42 passengers.
Aérospatiale ATR 72	9	ATR 72-202, ATR 72-500	Six 202 series and three 500. Cargo only or 22, 34 or 62 passengers.
Dornier 328JET	1	328-300JET	Not listed at the Calm Air site.
Total	15		

In addition, Calm Air has access to Boeing 737 Classic 400 series from Canadian North.
