= YCS =

YCS may refer to:

- Chesterfield Inlet Airport (IATA code)
- Ypsilanti Community Schools
