= Canadian NORAD Region Forward Operating Location Rankin Inlet =

Canadian military installation

- Part of Canadian NORAD Region Forward Operating Locations
- Rankin Inlet, Nunavut, Canada
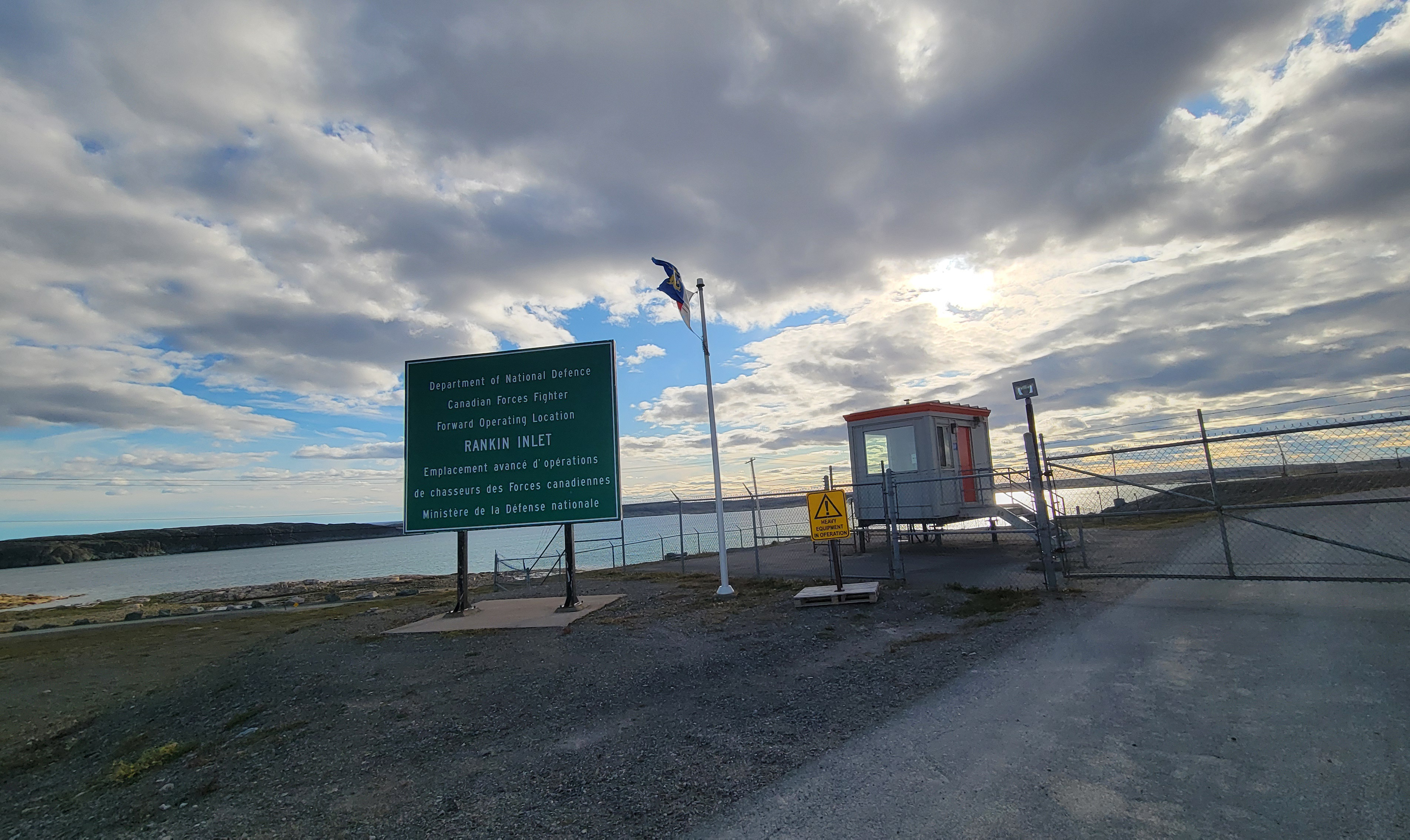

Site information
- Controlled by: Royal Canadian Air Force
- Condition: Operational

Location
- Location of FOL Rankin Inlet
- Coordinates: 62.80563°N 92.1098°W

Site history
- Built: 1993-1994
- Built by: Royal Canadian Air Force
- In use: 1994

Garrison information
- Occupants: RCAF 4 Wing / CFB Cold Lake

Canadian NORAD Region (CANR) Forward Operating Location (FOL) Rankin Inlet was upgraded as part of the North American Air Defence Modernization (NAADM) program authorized at the Shamrock Summit held in Quebec City on March 18, 1985. The NAADM program was authorized by the Canada-United States Memorandum of Understanding signed by Prime Minister Mulroney and President Reagan at the summit. The purpose of the upgraded facilities at Rankin Inlet Airport was to accommodate up to six fighters in hangars when needed, 200 support personnel, and storage facilities. The facility was built and accepted by DND in 1994, without munitions storage facilities.

FOL Rankin Inlet is located immediately southwest of the Rankin Inlet Airport. As part of the airport upgrades needed during the construction of the FOL, a layer of insulation was placed under the paved surfaces to better protect the permafrost layer beneath them. Apron II / Taxiway B serves the FOL's operation.

In 2005 the Government of Nunavut was reported to have been pursuing acquiring use of the support buildings at FOL Rankin Inlet for trades educational programs, but in 2006 it was announced that plan had been scrapped since the school would have short notice to vacate the building in case the military needed the premises back.
