= Canadian NORAD Region Forward Operating Location Yellowknife =

- Part of Canadian NORAD Region Forward Operating Locations
- Yellowknife, Northwest Territories in Canada
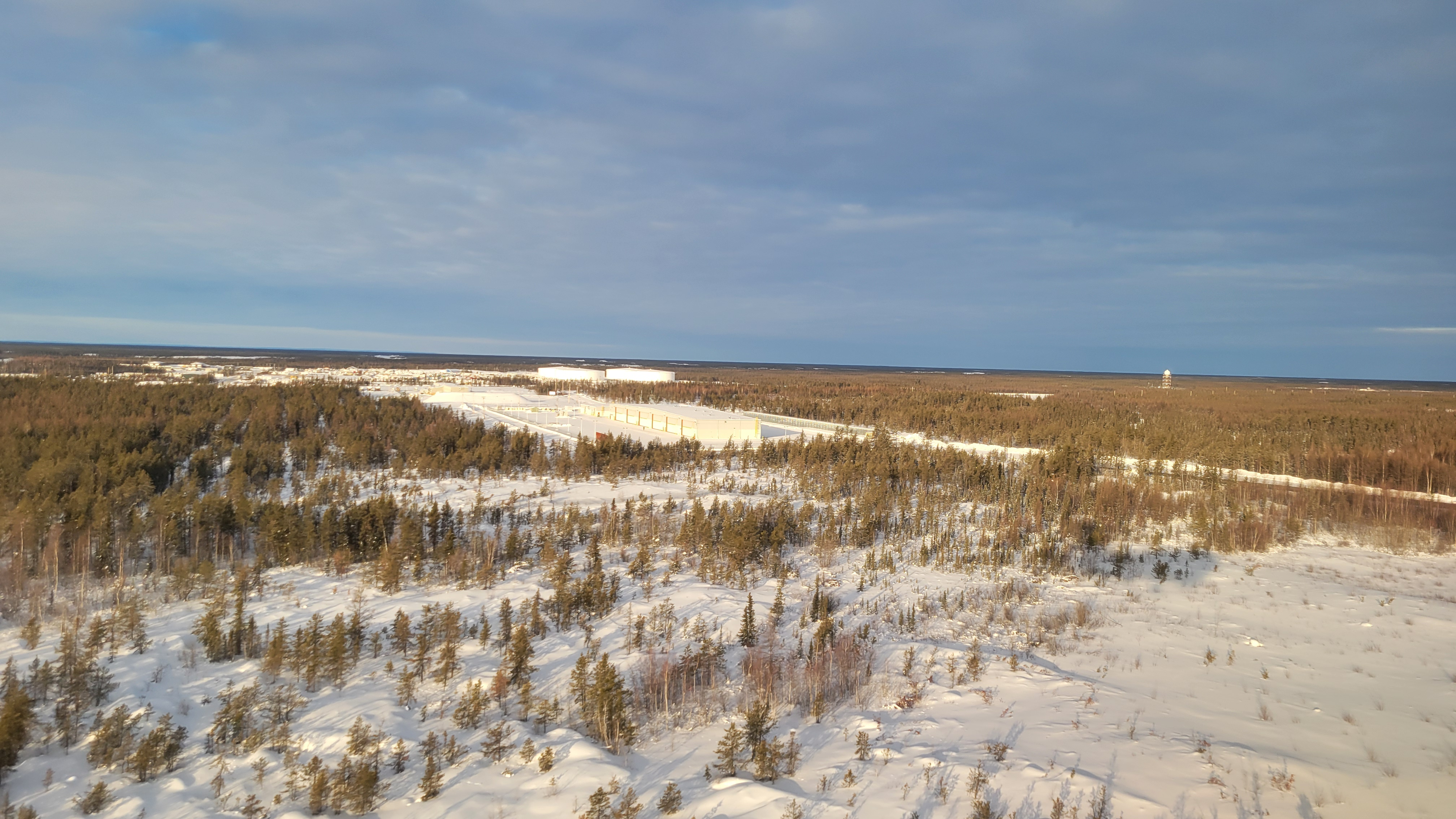
- Aerial view of Canadian NORAD Region Forward Operating Location Yellowknife in winter

Site information
- Controlled by: Royal Canadian Air Force
- Condition: Operational

Location
- Location of CANR FOL Yellowknife CANR FOL Yellowknife (Canada)
- Coordinates: 62.45128°N 114.4504°W

Site history
- Built: 1994
- Built by: Royal Canadian Air Force
- In use: 1994

Garrison information
- Occupants: RCAF 17 Wing / CFB Winnipeg

Canadian NORAD Region (CANR) Forward Operating Location (FOL) Yellowknife was upgraded as part of the North American Air Defence Modernization (NAADM) program authorized at the Shamrock Summit held in Quebec City on March 18, 1985. The NAADM program was authorized by the Canada-United States Memorandum of Understanding signed by Prime Minister Mulroney and Ronald Reagan at the summit. The purpose of the upgraded facilities at Yellowknife Airport was to accommodate up to six fighters in hangars when needed, 200 support personnel, and storage facilities. The facility was built and accepted by DND in 1994, without munitions storage facilities.

FOL Yellowknife is located immediately southwest of the Yellowknife Airport (YZF), and uses its runways when required.
