= Canadian NORAD Region Forward Operating Locations =

Canadian NORAD Region (CANR) Forward Operating Locations (FOLs) were created under the North American Air Defence Modernization (NAADM) program authorized at the Shamrock Summit held in Quebec City on March 18, 1985. The locations are maintained by the Canadian Department of National Defence. The NAADM program was authorized by the Canada-United States Memorandum of Understanding signed by Prime Minister Mulroney and Ronald Reagan at the summit. The purpose of these upgraded facilities was to ensure adequate facilities existed for NORAD to defend the Northern Canadian frontier. Accommodations for up to six fighters in hangars were built, space for up to 200 support personnel, and storage facilities. Five locations were originally investigated, but only four locations were built.

== Locations ==
| Site | Location |
|---|---|
| FOL Yellowknife | 62.45131°N 114.4501°W |
| FOL Rankin Inlet | 62.80563°N 92.1098°W |
| FOL Iqaluit | 63.75107°N 68.5534°W |
| FOL Inuvik | 68.30740°N 133.47022°W |
| FOL Goose Bay | 53°18'02.1"N 60°26'41.7"W |
| FOL Kuujjuaq (Fort Chimo) | Cancelled |
