= ZTM =

The abbreviation ZTM means:

- Public Transport Authority (Warsaw) (in Polish: Zarząd Transportu Miejskiego w Warszawie), municipal transport authority in Warsaw, Poland
- Metropolitan Transport Authority (Metropolis GZM) (in Polish: Zarząd Transportu Metropolitalnego), municipal transport authority in the Metropolis GZM, Poland
- Zbrojovka Vsetín, a Czech weapon factory
- the IATA code for Shamattawa Airport, Manitoba, Canada
