= CYCS =

CYCS may refer to:

- Cytochrome c, a protein
- Cyclorama (theater) plural - a large curtain or wall, often concave, positioned at the back of the stage area
- the ICAO code for Chesterfield Inlet Airport in Nunavut, Canada
