= The Pas Airport =

Airport in Manitoba, Canada

- IATA: YQD; ICAO: CYQD; WMO: 71867

Summary
- Airport type: Public
- Operator: Town of The Pas
- Location: The Pas, Manitoba
- Time zone: CST (UTC−06:00)
  - Summer (DST): CDT (UTC−05:00)
- Elevation AMSL: 888 ft (271 m)
- Coordinates: 53°58′17″N 101°05′28″W

Map
- Location in Manitoba CYQD (Canada)

Runways
Direction	Length		Surface
Direction	ft	m	Surface
13/31	5,901	1,799	Asphalt

Statistics (2010)
- Aircraft movements: 4,767
- Source: Canada Flight Supplement; Environment Canada; Movements from Statistics Canada

The Pas Airport (IATA: YQD, ICAO: CYQD) is located 10 nautical miles (19 km; 12 mi) northeast of The Pas, Manitoba, Canada, near the southern shore of Clearwater Lake.

== RCAF Aerodrome The Pas ==
In approximately 1942 the aerodrome was listed at 53°58′N 101°06′W with a Var. 17 degrees E and no elevation data. Three runways were listed as follows:

Runway name	Length	Width	Surface
2/20	6000'	200'	Hard (asphalt) surfaced
12/30	4000'	200'	Hard (asphalt) surfaced
7/25	6300'	200'	Hard (asphalt) surfaced

The runways are listed as under construction, serviceable.

== Airlines and destinations ==
Airlines	Destinations
Calm Air	Flin Flon, Winnipeg

== See also ==
- List of airports in Manitoba
- The Pas/Grace Lake Airport
- The Pas/Grace Lake Water Aerodrome
