= Rankin Inlet Airport =

Airport in Nunavut, Canada

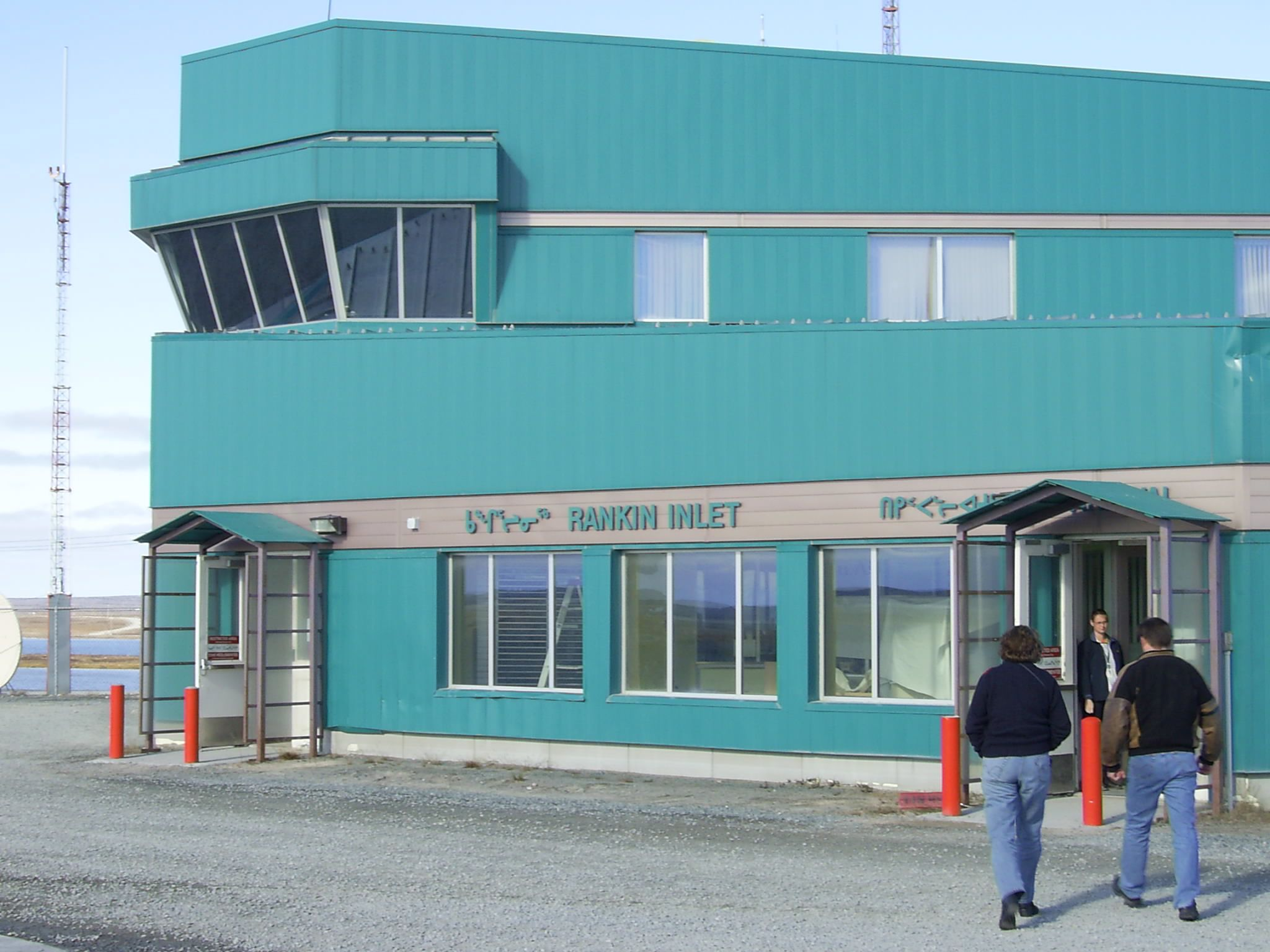
- IATA: YRT; ICAO: CYRT; WMO: 71083

Summary
- Airport type: Public
- Operator: Government of Nunavut
- Location: Rankin Inlet, Nunavut
- Time zone: CST (UTC−06:00)
  - Summer (DST): CDT (UTC−05:00)
- Elevation AMSL: 106 ft / 32 m
- Coordinates: 62°48′38″N 092°06′53″W

Map
- Location in Nunavut CYRT (Canada)

Runways
Direction	Length		Surface
Direction	ft	m	Surface
13/31	6,000	1,829	Asphalt

Statistics (2010)
- Aircraft movements: 13,071
- Sources: Canada Flight Supplement; Environment Canada; Movements from Statistics Canada

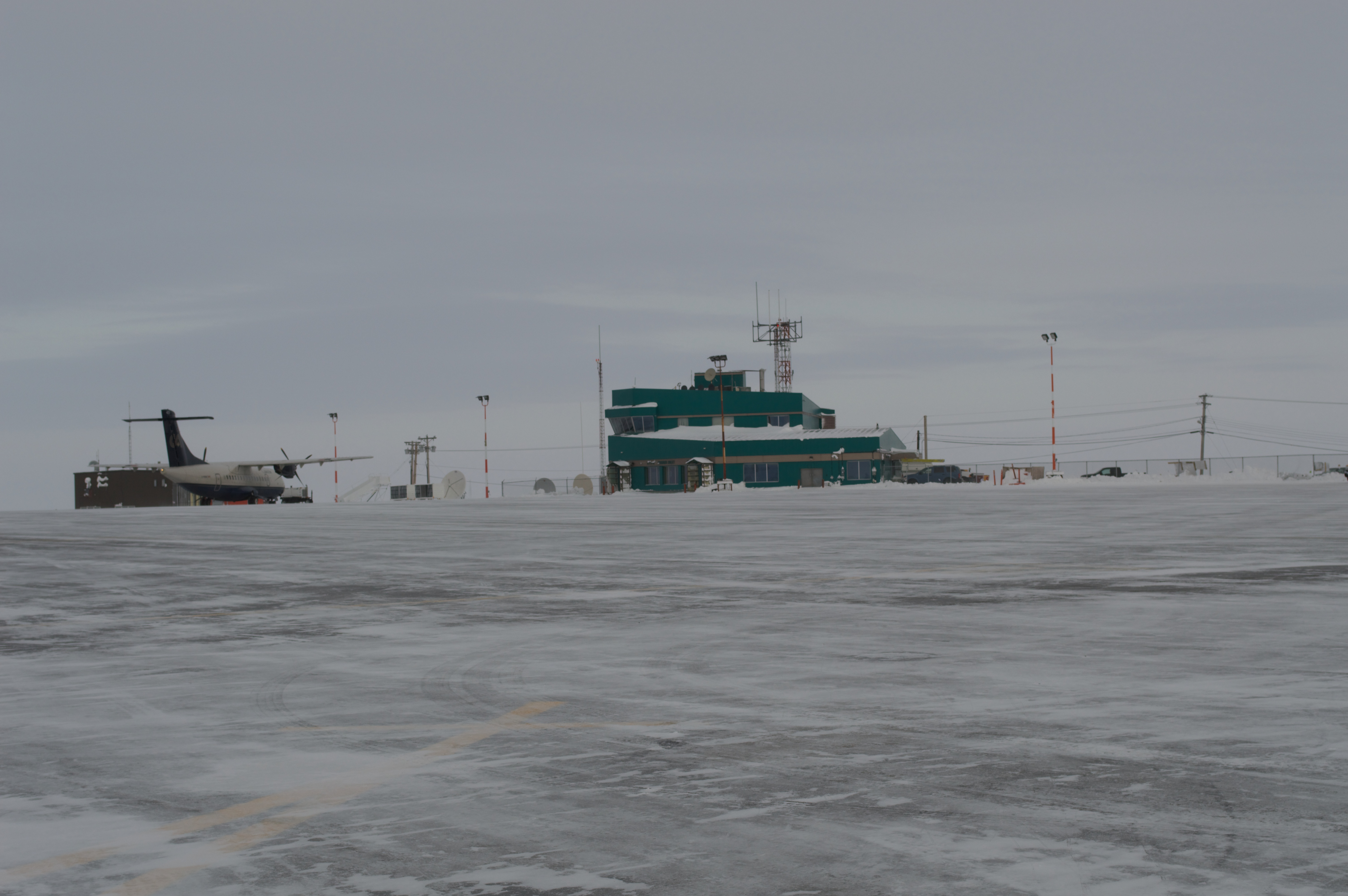
Ramp

Rankin Inlet Airport (IATA: YRT, ICAO: CYRT) is located at Rankin Inlet, Nunavut, Canada, and is operated by the Government of Nunavut.

In December 2005, the Government of Nunavut announced that it would spend $3 million to improve the Instrument Landing System and expand the apron. A new terminal building is scheduled to open in spring 2025 at a cost of $85 million, funded by the National Trade Corridors Fund and the Government of Nunavut. The old building will be demolished as the mechanical and electrical systems are approaching the end of their useful life.

The Canadian NORAD Region Forward Operating Location Rankin Inlet is located on the southwest side of the runway and shares the use of the runway when operations necessitate.

== Airlines and destinations ==
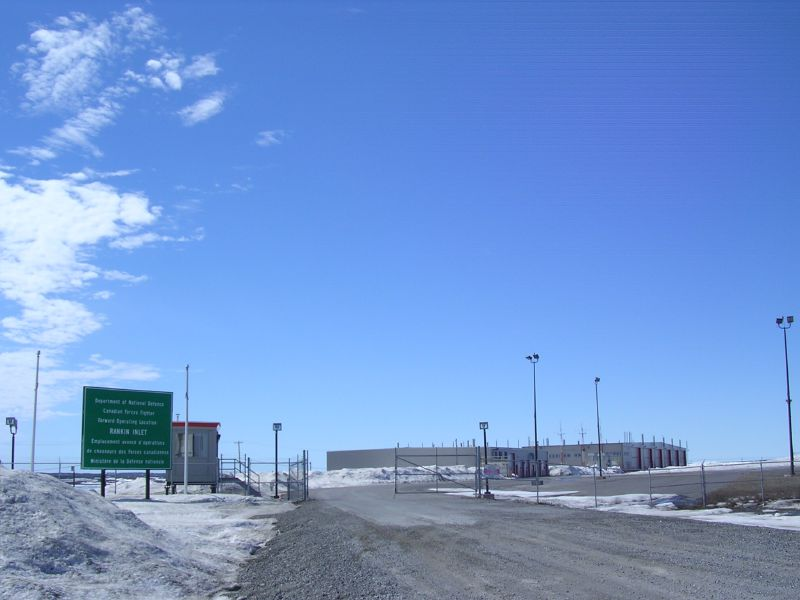
The DND Forward Operating Location hangars for CF-18's in Rankin Inlet

Airlines	Destinations
Calm Air	Arviat, Baker Lake, Chesterfield Inlet, Coral Harbour, Naujaat, Whale Cove, Winnipeg
Canadian North	Iqaluit, Ottawa, Yellowknife
Nolinor Aviation	Charter: Meadowbank, Montreal–Mirabel, Val d'Or
