= Winnipeg Richardson International Airport =

International airport in Manitoba, Canada

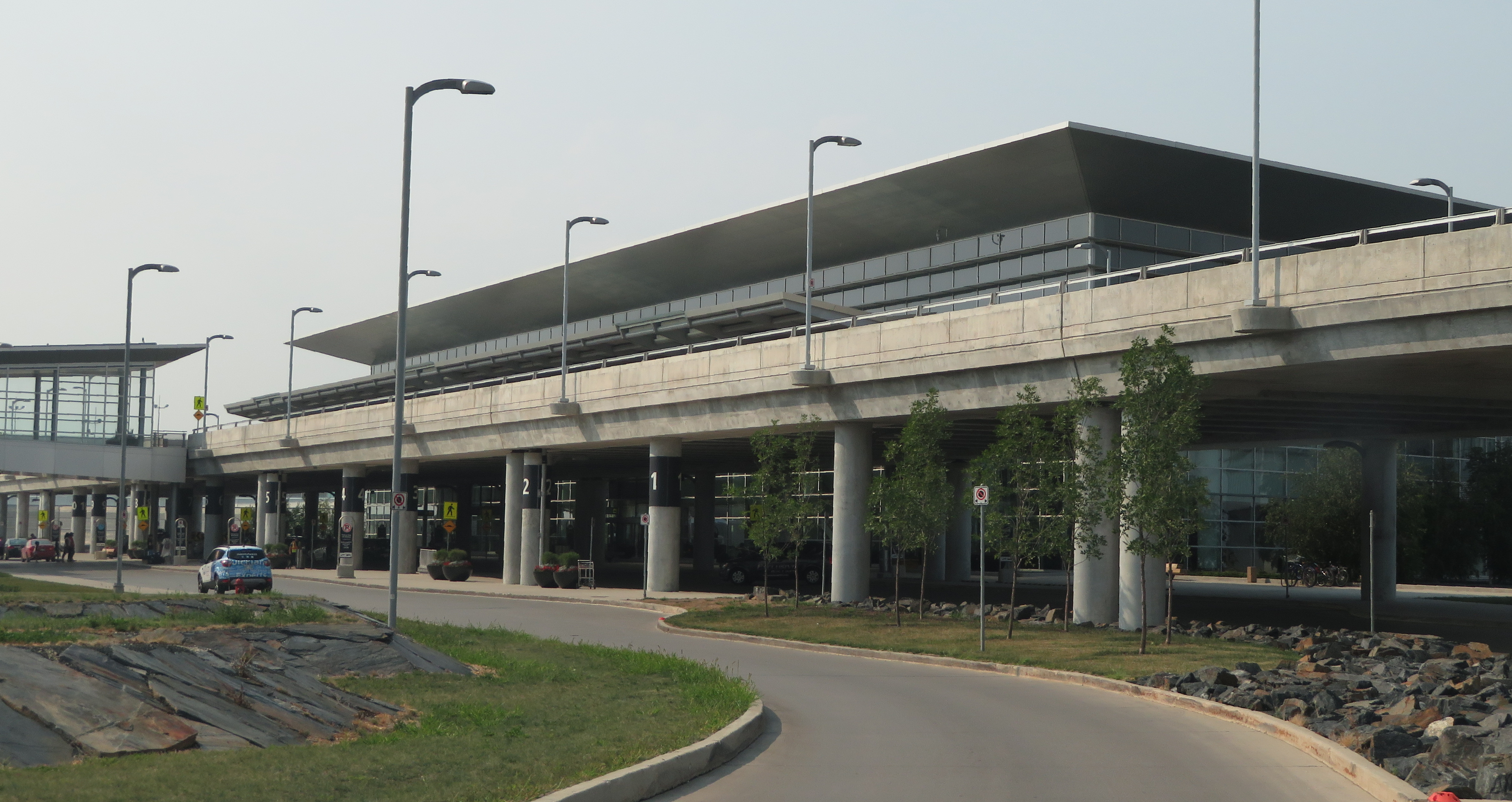
- IATA: YWG; ICAO: CYWG; WMO: 71852

Summary
- Airport type: Public
- Owner: Transport Canada
- Operator: Winnipeg Airports Authority (DND)
- Hub for: Bearskin Airlines; Calm Air; Cargojet; Perimeter Aviation
- Focus city for: WestJet
- Operating base for: Flair Airlines
- Time zone: CST (UTC−06:00)
  - Summer (DST): CDT (UTC−05:00)
- Elevation AMSL: 784 ft (239 m)
- Coordinates: 49°54′36″N 097°14′24″W
- Public transit access: Winnipeg Transit; D12 D13 224
- Website: www.waa.ca

Map
- Interactive map of Winnipeg Richardson International Airport

Runways
Direction	Length		Surface
Direction	ft	m	Surface
13/31	8,841	2,695	Asphalt
18/36	11,000	3,353	Asphalt

Statistics (2025)
- Aircraft movements: 115,392
- Number of passengers: 4,412,013
- Sources: Canada Flight Supplement; Environment Canada; Movements from Statistics Canada; Passenger statistics from Winnipeg Airports Authority

Winnipeg James Armstrong Richardson International Airport (commonly known as Winnipeg Richardson International Airport, Winnipeg International Airport or Winnipeg Airport; IATA: YWG, ICAO: CYWG) is an international airport located in Winnipeg, Manitoba, Canada. It is the seventh busiest airport in Canada by passenger traffic, and the 11th busiest airport in Canada by aircraft movements in the previous year. Winnipeg International Airport is a hub for Calm Air, Perimeter Airlines, and cargo airline Cargojet, also serving as a focus city for WestJet and an operating base for Flair Airlines. The airport is co-located with Canadian Forces Base Winnipeg, covering a total land area of 1,370 hectares (3,400 acres).

An important transportation hub within the province of Manitoba, Winnipeg International Airport serves as the primary airport for a large geographical area that includes parts of neighbouring Northwestern Ontario and Nunavut. The airport is operated by Winnipeg Airports Authority as part of Transport Canada's National Airports System and is one of nine Canadian airports that has U.S. border pre-clearance facilities.

Daily non-stop flights operate from Winnipeg International Airport to destinations across Canada as well as to the United States, along with seasonal flights to Mexico, and the Caribbean. The airport also serves numerous small remote communities in Northern Manitoba, Northwestern Ontario, and Nunavut through regularly scheduled flights.

== History ==
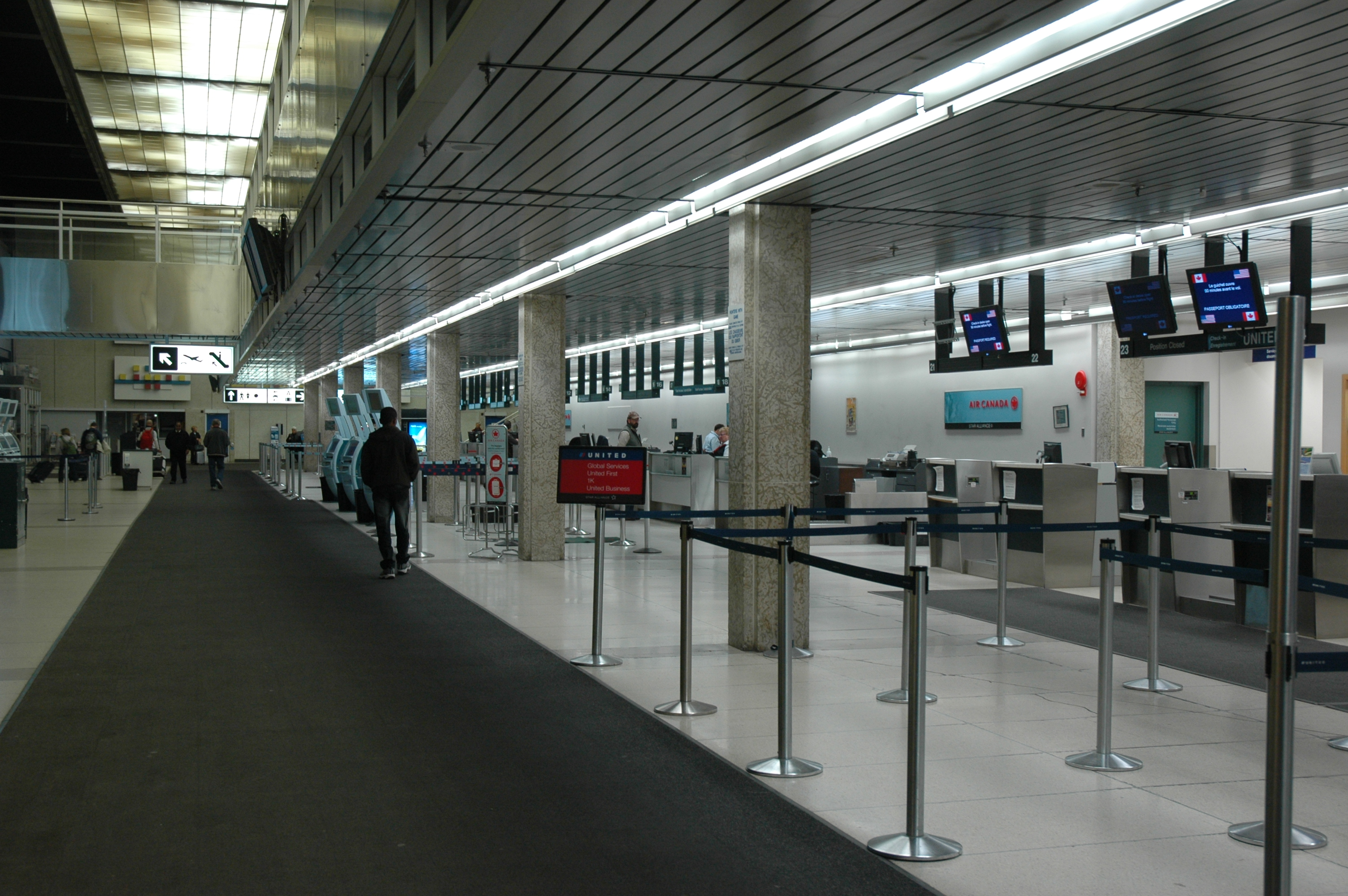
Check-in area of the former main terminal building prior to its closure and demolition

The airport opened in 1928 as Stevenson Aerodrome in honour of the noted Manitoba aviator and pioneer bush pilot, Captain Fred J. Stevenson. Stevenson Aerodrome, also known as Stevenson Field, was Canada's first international airport with Northwest Airways (which became Northwest Airlines) inaugurating a passenger and mail service between Winnipeg and Pembina, North Dakota on February 2, 1931.

By 1935, Northwest Airlines was operating daily service from the airport with Hamilton H-47 prop aircraft on a routing of Winnipeg – Pembina, ND – Grand Forks – Fargo – Minneapolis/St. Paul, MN – Milwaukee, WI – Chicago, IL.

The City of Winnipeg and the Rural Municipality of St. James agreed to develop Stevenson Field as a modern municipal airport in 1936. In 1938 the Manitoba Legislative Assembly passed the St. James–Winnipeg Airport Commission Act creating a commission of the same name with full control over the operation of the airport. In 1940, during the Second World War, the Government of Canada placed the airport under the direction of the Minister of Transport and the Royal Canadian Air Force where it remained until 1997.

Also in 1940, Trans-Canada Air Lines (TCA) was operating daily round trip transcontinental service across Canada via the airport with a routing of Montreal – Ottawa – North Bay – Kapuskasing – Wagaming – Winnipeg – Regina – Lethbridge – Vancouver flown with Lockheed Model 10 Electra twin prop aircraft with connecting service to and from Toronto being offered via North Bay.

=== Post-war ===
In 1962, Stevenson Field was officially renamed Winnipeg International Airport, followed in 1997 by the airport's transfer to the control of the Winnipeg Airports Authority.

The original main terminal building was built in 1964, and was designed by the architectural firm of Green Blankstein Russell and Associates (subsequently GBR Associates and Stantec Limited). It was expanded and renovated in 1984 by the architectural firm of IKOY, and a hotel was built across from the terminal in 1998. The original main terminal building was closed on Sunday October 30, 2011 and has since been demolished.

Winnipeg Airport was briefly served by Scandinavian Airlines (SAS) during the mid-1950s on the world's first regular polar route, which linked Copenhagen and Los Angeles with Douglas DC-6B propliner flights via Søndre Strømfjord, Greenland and Winnipeg.

Two passenger airlines operating jet aircraft were previously based at the Winnipeg International Airport: Transair (Canada) and Greyhound Air (both now-defunct). Transair and Greyhound Air operated scheduled flights across Manitoba, Ontario, the Northwest Territories and the Yukon from its Winnipeg hub in addition to operating charter services from the airport to Europe, the Caribbean, Mexico, Florida, and Hawaii among other destinations in the U.S.

Six airlines were serving the airport with scheduled passenger flights during the 1970s and 1980s. Air Canada, CP Air, the original Frontier Airlines, Midwest Airlines, Northwest Airlines, and locally based Transair operated scheduled flights from Winnipeg to destinations including London–Heathrow, Amsterdam, Glasgow, New York–JFK, San Francisco, Honolulu, Denver, Las Vegas, Chicago–O'Hare, and Minneapolis/St. Paul. In the early 2000s, CanJet and Jetsgo (both now-defunct) operated nonstop service from Winnipeg to Toronto Pearson International Airport.

On December 10, 2006, the Minister of Transport, Lawrence Cannon, announced Winnipeg International Airport was to be renamed Winnipeg James Armstrong Richardson International Airport in honour of the influential businessman and pioneer of Canadian commercial aviation from Winnipeg. WestJet began seasonal flights to London's Gatwick Airport in May 2016.

== Facilities ==
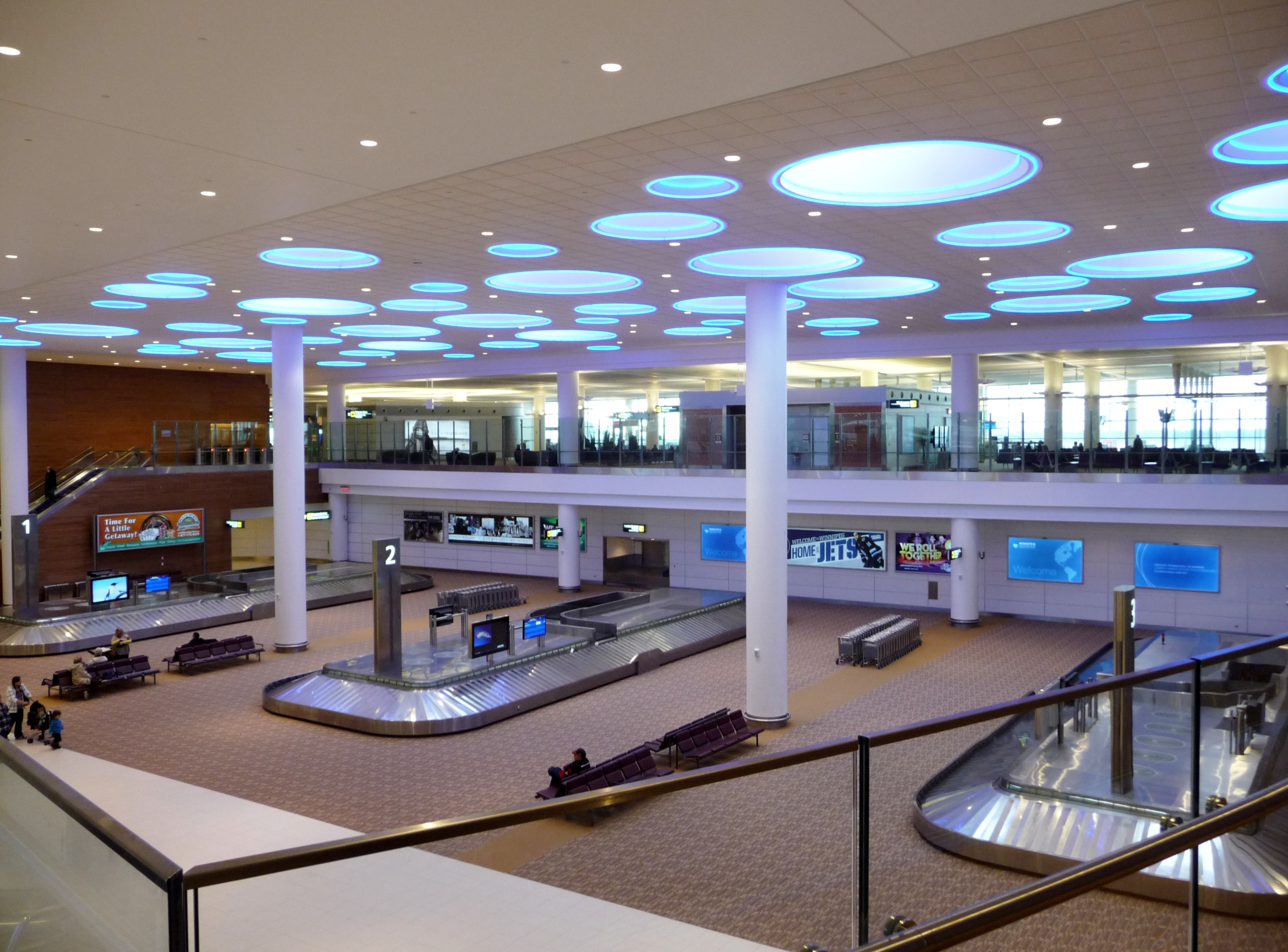
Arrivals area of the main terminal

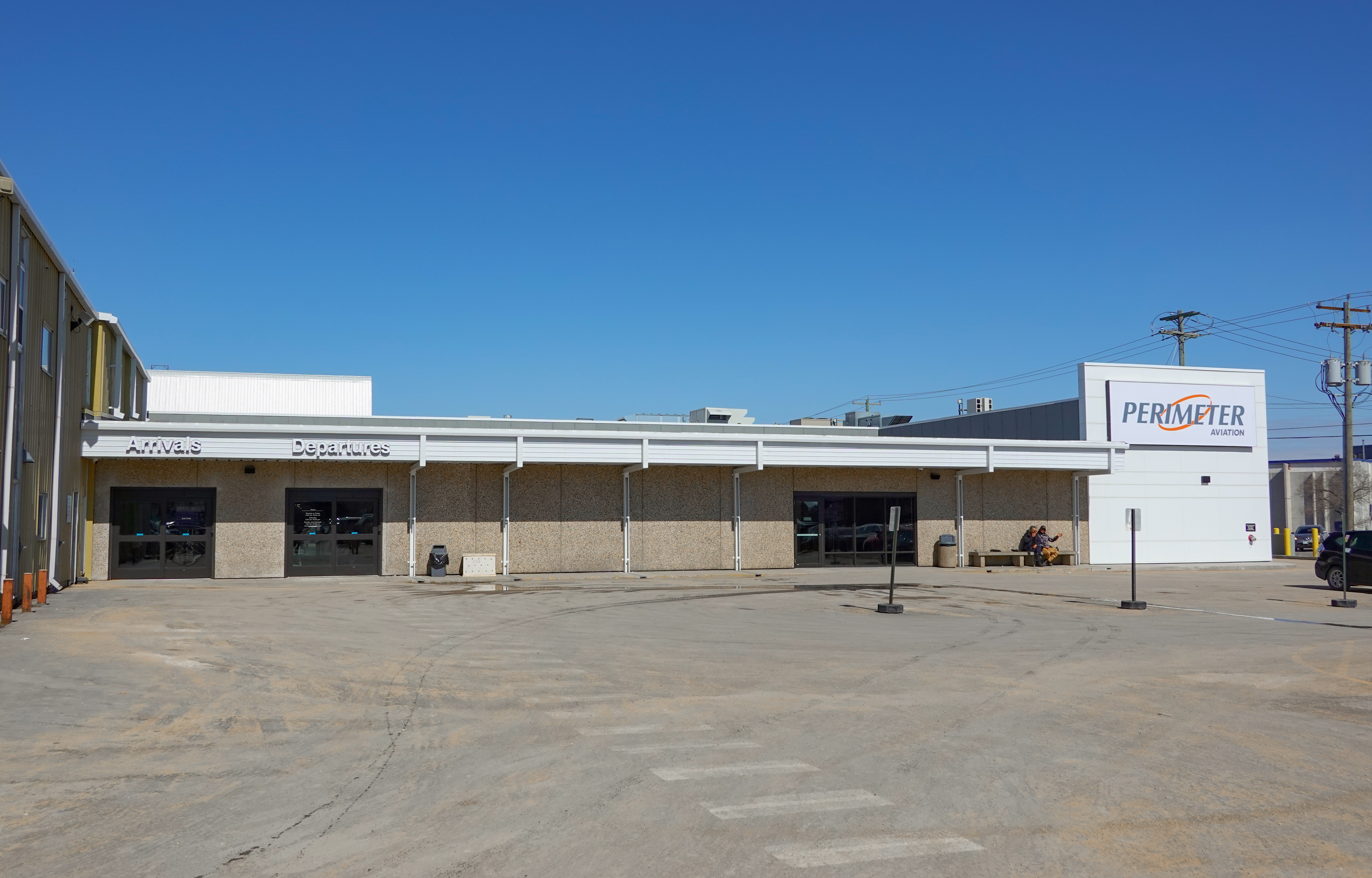
Perimeter Aviation's terminal building

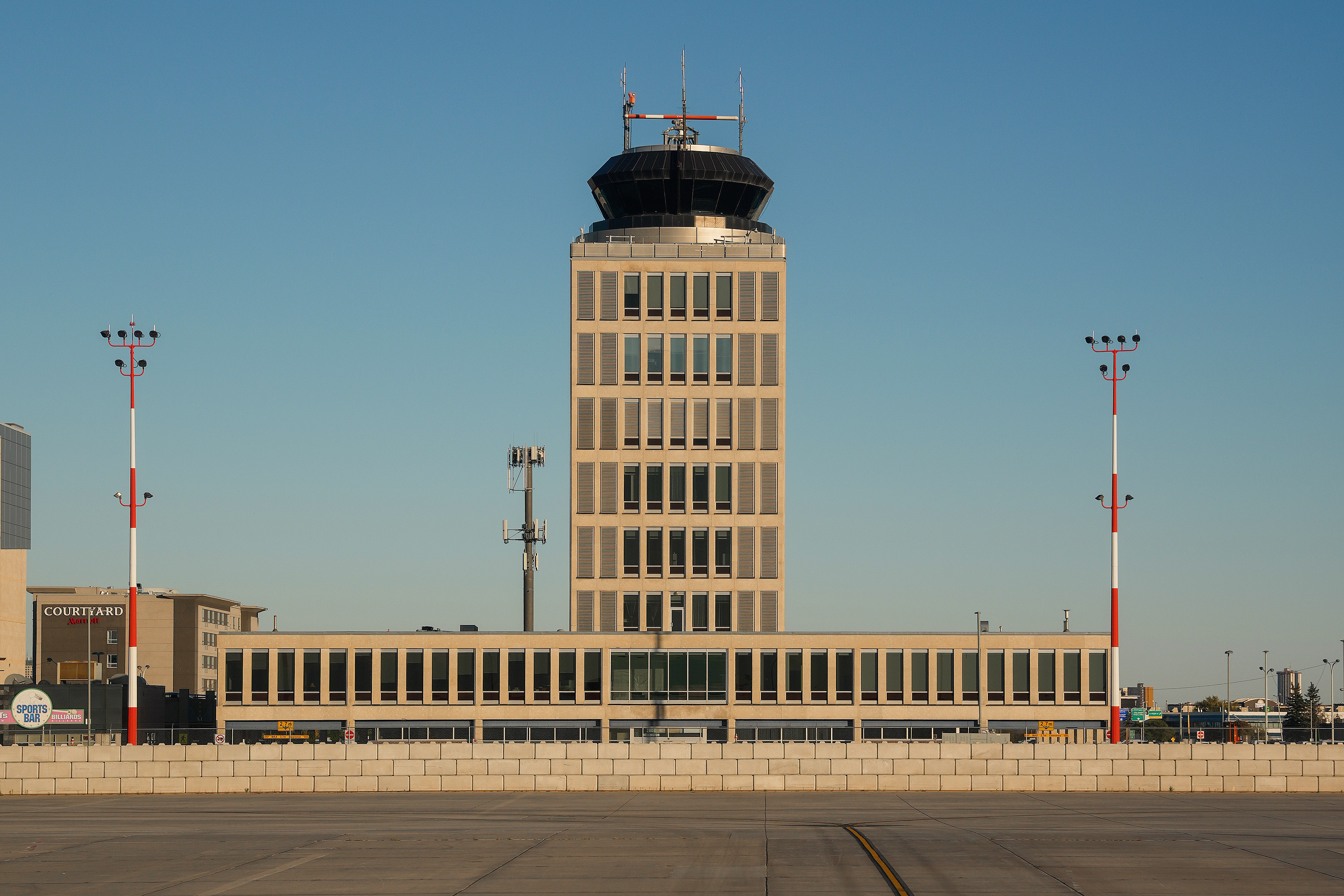
The air traffic control tower was built in the 1960s

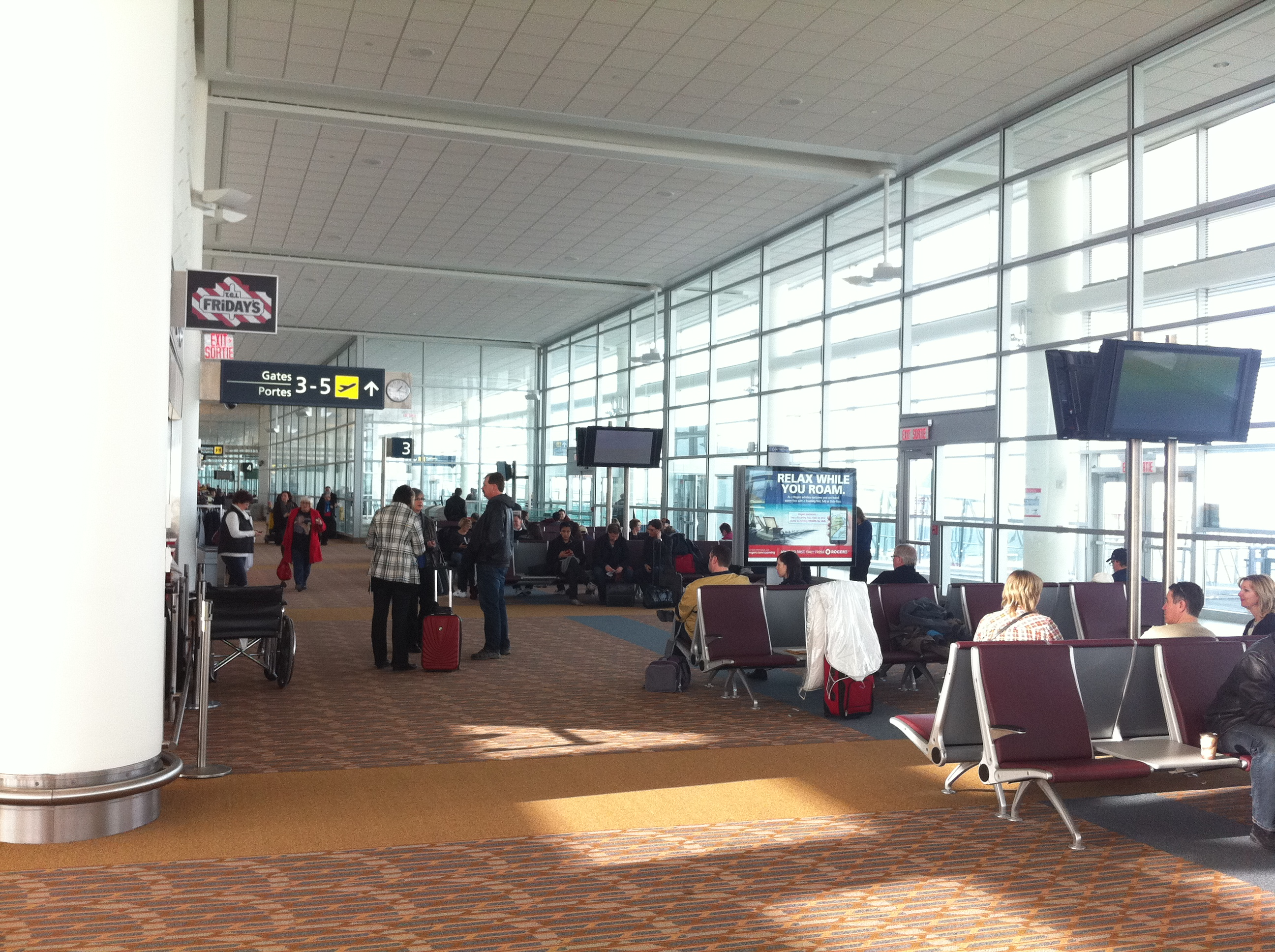
USA departure gates in the main terminal

=== Main terminal ===
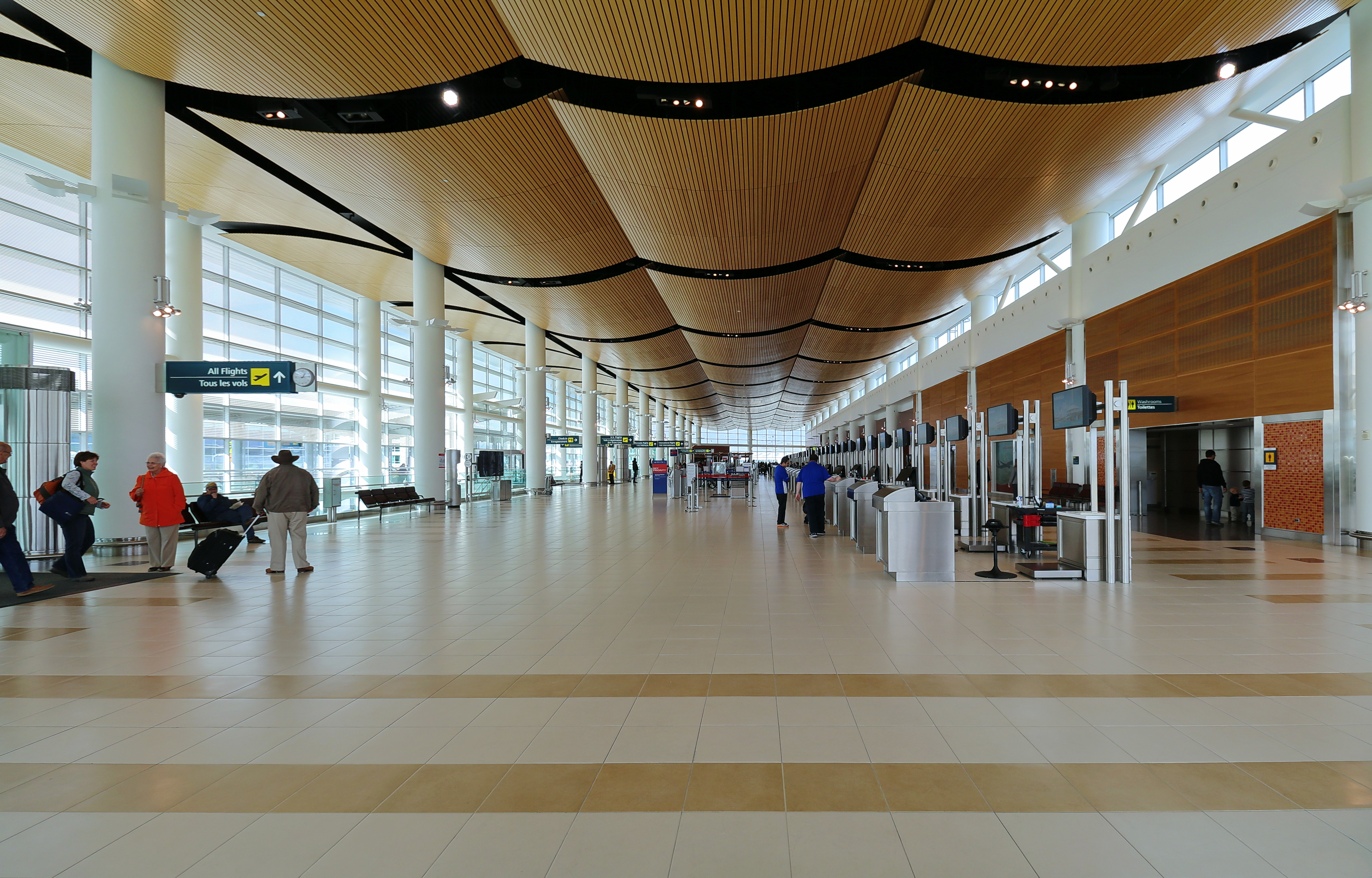
Check-in hall at Winnipeg Richardson International Airport's main terminal

Winnipeg's main airport terminal was designed by Argentine architect Cesar Pelli and Stantec. The terminal's design was inspired by the City of Winnipeg's distinctive landscape and Manitoba's vast prairies and sky. It was the first airport terminal in Canada to be LEED-certified for its environmentally friendly concept, design, construction and operation. The terminal was constructed in two phases, with construction beginning in 2007 and ending on October 30, 2011, when it was officially opened to the public. Prior to the opening of the current main terminal building, a multi-level access road and four-level, 1,559-stall parkade were both opened in November 2006. All airlines serving Winnipeg International Airport operate at the main terminal building, with the exception of Perimeter Aviation.

Air Canada operates a Maple Leaf Lounge located in the domestic/international departures area, and a "pay-in" lounge, operated by Plaza Premium Lounge, is also located in the domestic/international departures area. Free Wi-Fi is provided by the Winnipeg Airports Authority throughout the entire main terminal building.

The airport offers United States border preclearance facilities.

=== Perimeter Aviation terminal ===
Perimeter Aviation is a regional airline that operates its own small, exclusive terminal building at Winnipeg International Airport to facilitate its passenger, cargo and charter services. Perimeter Aviation does not use the main terminal building because it serves small remote communities in Northern Manitoba and Northwestern Ontario using small propeller aircraft, for which regular airport terminal services (jet bridge, catering, etc.) are unnecessary and can actually be a hindrance.

The Perimeter Aviation terminal building is located 2.6 kilometres (1.6 mi) south of the main terminal building.

=== Other facilities ===
A large Canada Post mail processing facility was opened at the airport site on June 4, 2010. The 23,225-square-metre (249,990 sq ft) facility is located east of the main terminal building, just north of Wellington Avenue. It is responsible for processing all mail and parcels for Manitoba, and some parts of Ontario and Northern Canada.

Three hotels are located on site, adjacent to the main airport terminal.

==== CentrePort Canada ====
Richardson International Airport is included in a new 8,000-hectare (20,000-acre) dry port created by provincial legislation—CentrePort Canada Act, C.C.S.M. c. C44—that will offer investment opportunities for distribution centres, warehousing and manufacturing. CentrePort Canada will allow companies to take advantage of the cargo capabilities of Richardson International Airport, as well as serviced land, a mid-continent location and highway and rail transport.

On April 14, 2009, Prime Minister Stephen Harper with Premier Gary Doer announced at James Richardson that both the federal and provincial governments would contribute CA$212.5 million towards a divided four-lane expressway called CentrePort Canada Way. It is now complete, and links the west end of Inkster Boulevard to the Perimeter Highway by a route north of (and roughly parallel to) the CP Rail Glenboro subdivision and Saskatchewan Avenue. Its purpose was to attract transportation logistics-associated development to the area west and northwest of the airport, in the city and in Rosser Municipality.

== Airlines and destinations ==
=== Passenger ===
Airlines	Destinations
Air Canada	Montréal–Trudeau, Toronto–Pearson, Vancouver
Air Canada Express	Calgary, Ottawa, Vancouver
Air Canada Rouge	Seasonal: Cancún, Montego Bay (resumes December 7, 2026), Punta Cana (resumes December 3, 2026),
Bearskin Airlines	Red Lake, Sioux Lookout
Calm Air	Churchill, Flin Flon, Gillam, Rankin Inlet, Sanikiluaq, The Pas, Thompson
Delta Connection	Minneapolis/St. Paul
Flair Airlines	Toronto–Pearson, Vancouver; Seasonal: Calgary, Edmonton
Perimeter Aviation	Cross Lake, Deer Lake (ON), Garden Hill, Gods Lake Narrows, Gods River, Lac Brochet, North Spirit Lake, Norway House, Oxford House, Pikangikum, Red Sucker Lake, Sachigo Lake, St. Theresa Point, Sandy Lake, Shamattawa, Sioux Lookout, Thompson, York Landing
Porter Airlines	Hamilton (ON), Ottawa, Toronto–Pearson; Seasonal: Montréal–MET
United Express	Chicago–O'Hare, Denver
WestJet	Calgary, Cancún, Edmonton, Montréal–Trudeau (resumes March 24, 2027), Ottawa, Toronto–Pearson, Vancouver; Seasonal: Belize City (begins December 14, 2026), Fort Lauderdale, Halifax, Huatulco, Kelowna, Las Vegas, Liberia (CR), London (ON), Mazatlán, Montego Bay, Orlando, Palm Springs, Phoenix–Sky Harbor, Puerto Plata (begins 22 December 2026), Puerto Vallarta, Punta Cana, Reykjavík–Keflavík, St. John's (NL), San José del Cabo, Victoria
WestJet Encore	Regina, Saskatoon, Thunder Bay

== Statistics ==
=== Annual traffic ===
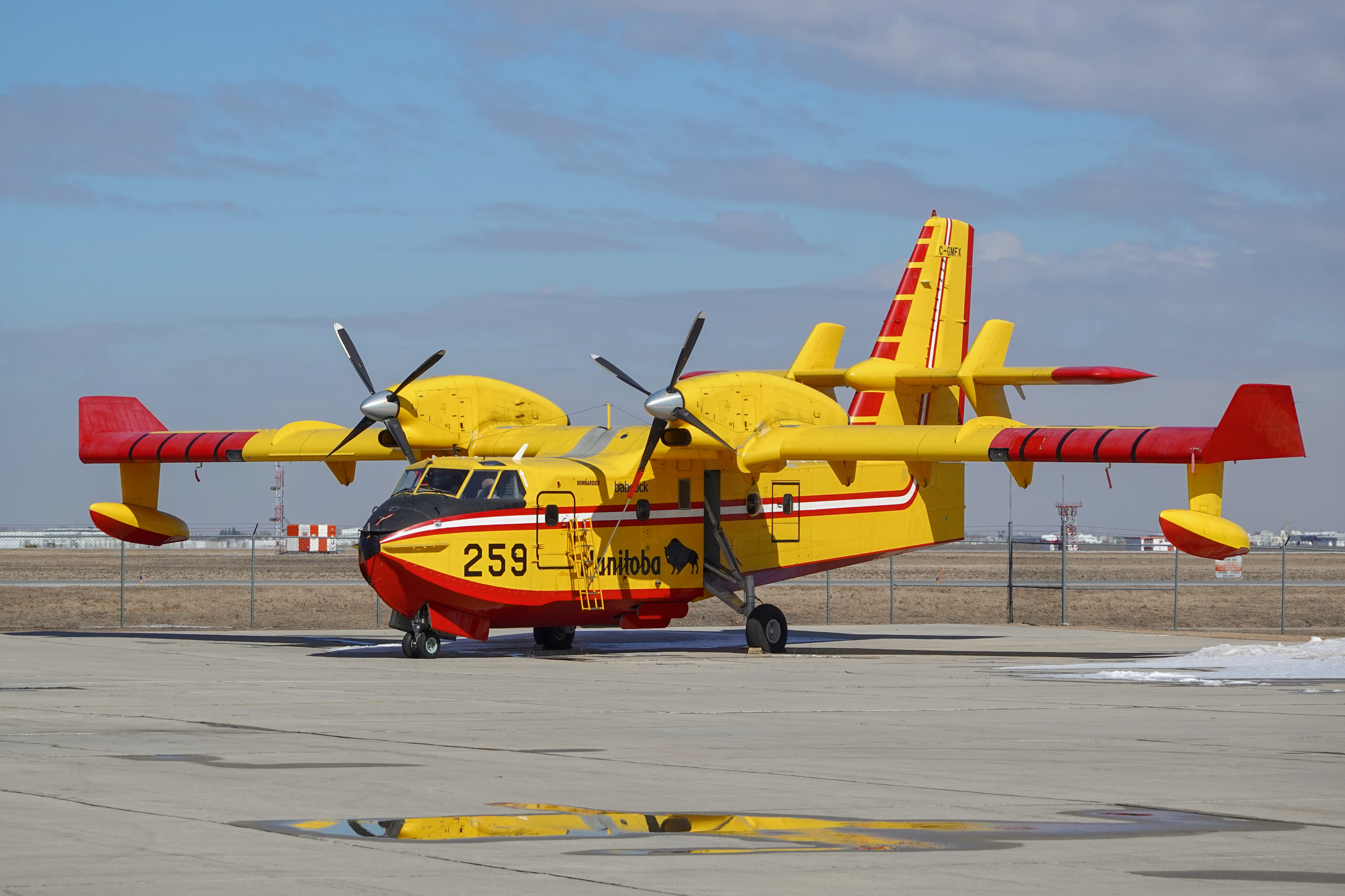
A Canadair CL-415 owned by the Government of Manitoba to combat wildfires

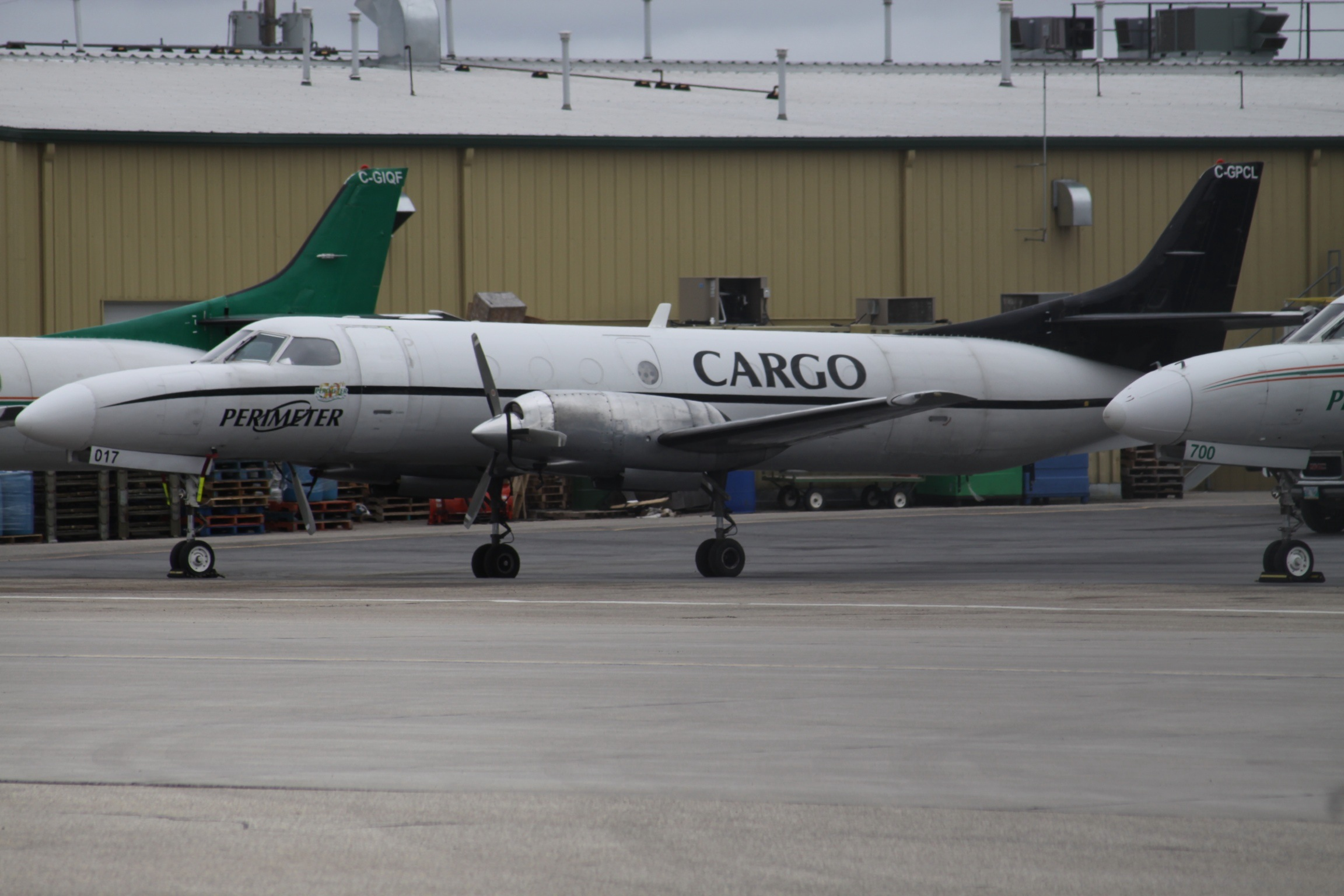
C-GPCL Swearingen SA226AT Merlin IV Perimeter of Perimeter Airlines Cargo at Winnipeg

Annual passenger traffic
Year	Passengers	% change
2010	3,369,974	Steady
2011	3,389,237	▲0.6%
2012	3,538,175	▲4.4%
2013	3,484,252	▼ -1.5%
2014	3,669,797	▲5.3%
2015	3,778,035	▲2.9%
2016	4,015,200	▲6.9%
2017	4,305,744	▲7.2%
2018	4,484,343	▲4.5%
2019	4,484,249	▼0.0%
2020	1,299,225	▼71.1%
2021	1,223,054	▼5.9%
2022	3,031,113	▲147.8%
2023	4,094,793	▲35.1%
2024	4,297,478	▲4.9%
2025	4,412,013	▲2.7%

=== Top destinations ===
Top domestic routes from YWG (as of 4 July 2025)
Rank	Destinations	Flights per week	Carriers
1	Toronto–Pearson, Ontario	93	Air Canada, Flair, Porter, WestJet
2	Calgary, Alberta	77	Air Canada, Flair, WestJet
3	Vancouver, British Columbia	65	Air Canada, Flair, WestJet
4	Edmonton, Alberta	38	Flair, WestJet
5	Rankin Inlet, Nunavut	24	Calm Air
6	Montréal, Quebec	21	Air Canada
7	Ottawa, Ontario	18	Air Canada, Porter, WestJet
8	Red Lake, Ontario	17	Bearskin Airlines
9	Saskatoon, Saskatchewan	16	WestJet
10	Regina, Saskatchewan	14	WestJet

Busiest international routes from YWG (2024)
Rank	Airport	Passengers	Carriers
1	Minneapolis/St. Paul, Minnesota	156,813	Delta
2	Atlanta, Georgia	67,061	WestJet
3	Los Angeles, California	45,753	WestJet
4	Las Vegas, Nevada	42,211	WestJet
5	Cancún, Mexico	39,592	Air Canada, WestJet
6	Chicago, Illinois,	28,828	United
7	Orlando, Florida	28,522	WestJet
8	Denver, Colorado	28,459	United
9	Phoenix, Arizona	28,066	WestJet
10	Puerto Vallarta, Mexico	25,123	WestJet

== Ground transportation ==
=== Car ===
Winnipeg International Airport is located at 2000 Wellington Avenue in the City of Winnipeg. Several short and long term parkades are located on site, as well as a curb-side valet parking service.

=== Bus ===
Winnipeg Transit operates three bus routes that service the airport. A charging port has been added in October 2014 for Winnipeg transit's electric bus program. Greyhound Canada intercity buses used a station at the airport from 2009 to 2018, when service to Western Canada ended. The Brandon Air Shuttle provides shuttle transportation between Winnipeg International Airport and Manitoba's second largest city, Brandon.

== Accidents and incidents at or near YWG ==
- On February 6, 1941, a Trans-Canada Air Lines Lockheed Model 14 Super Electra diverted and crashed into trees on approach to Winnipeg a mile short of the airport after developing engine trouble. All three crew and nine passengers were killed.
- On October 6, 2005, a Morningstar Air Express Cessna 208 Caravan crashed 6.6 km (4.1mls) SE of YWG because of in-flight icing conditions and an overweight aircraft. The sole occupant, the pilot, was killed.

== See also ==
- List of airports in the Winnipeg area
- List of airports in Manitoba

== Sources ==
- Canada's Airports: Reinvention & Success. Ottawa-Macdonald-Cartier: Insight Media commissioned by the Canadian Airports Council (CAC), 2005.
