= York Landing Airport =

Airport in Manitoba, Canada

- IATA: ZAC; ICAO: CZAC

Summary
- Airport type: Public
- Operator: Government of Manitoba
- Serves: York Factory First Nation
- Location: York Landing, Manitoba
- Time zone: CST (UTC−06:00)
  - Summer (DST): CDT (UTC−05:00)
- Elevation AMSL: 623 ft (190 m)
- Coordinates: 56°05′22″N 096°05′21″W

Map
- Location in Manitoba CZAC (Canada)

Runways
Direction	Length		Surface
Direction	ft	m	Surface
10/28	3,397	1,035	Crushed rock

Statistics (2010)
- Aircraft movements: 398
- Source: Canada Flight Supplement; Movements from Statistics Canada.

York Landing Airport (IATA: ZAC, ICAO: CZAC) is located adjacent to York Landing, Manitoba, Canada. The Government of Manitoba owns and operates the airport.

== Airlines and destinations ==
Airlines	Destinations
Perimeter Aviation	Thompson, Winnipeg, South Indian Lake

== See also ==
- List of airports in Manitoba
