= Thompson Airport =

Airport in Manitoba, Canada

Thompson Municipal Airport
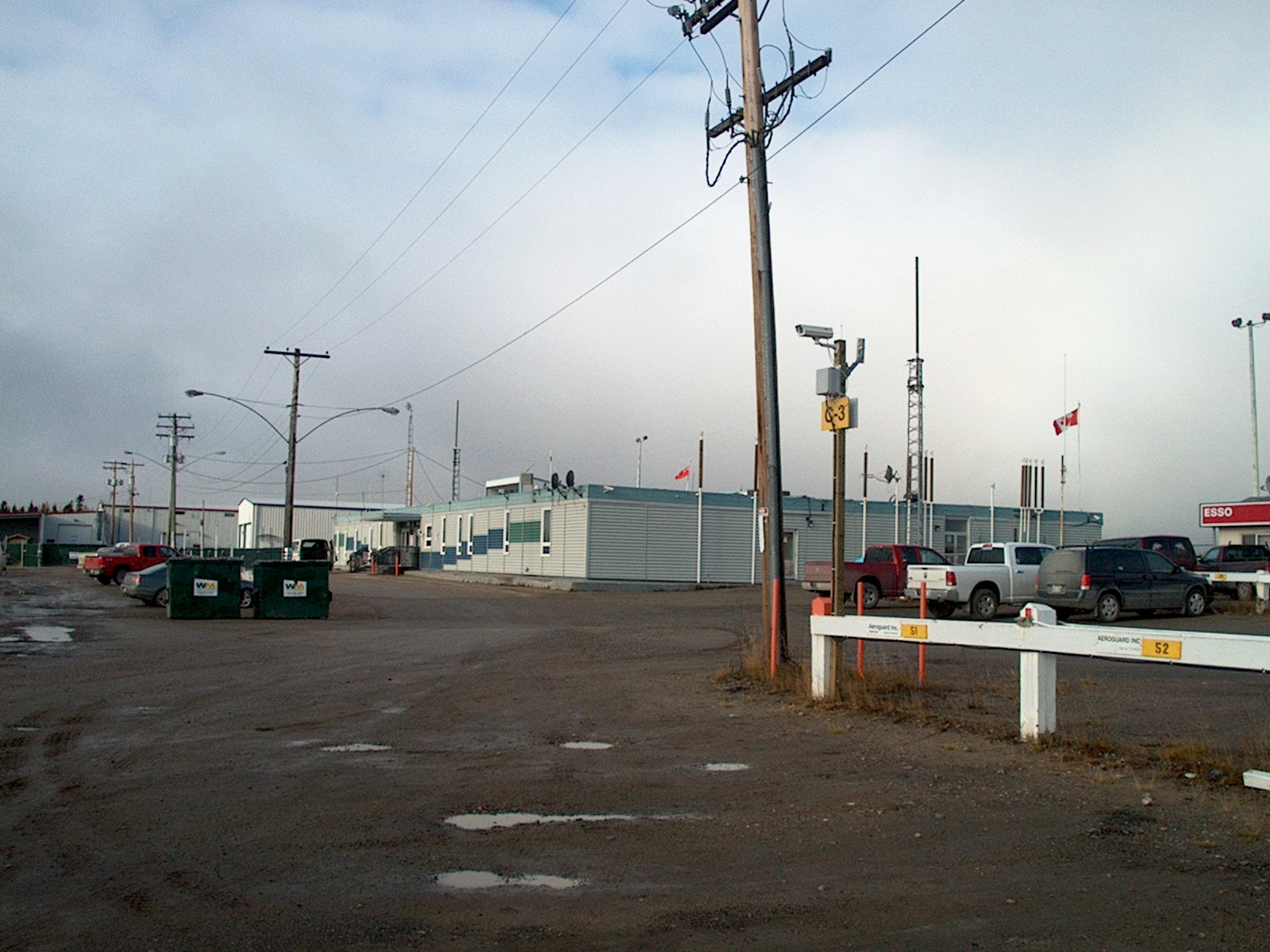
- South Apron

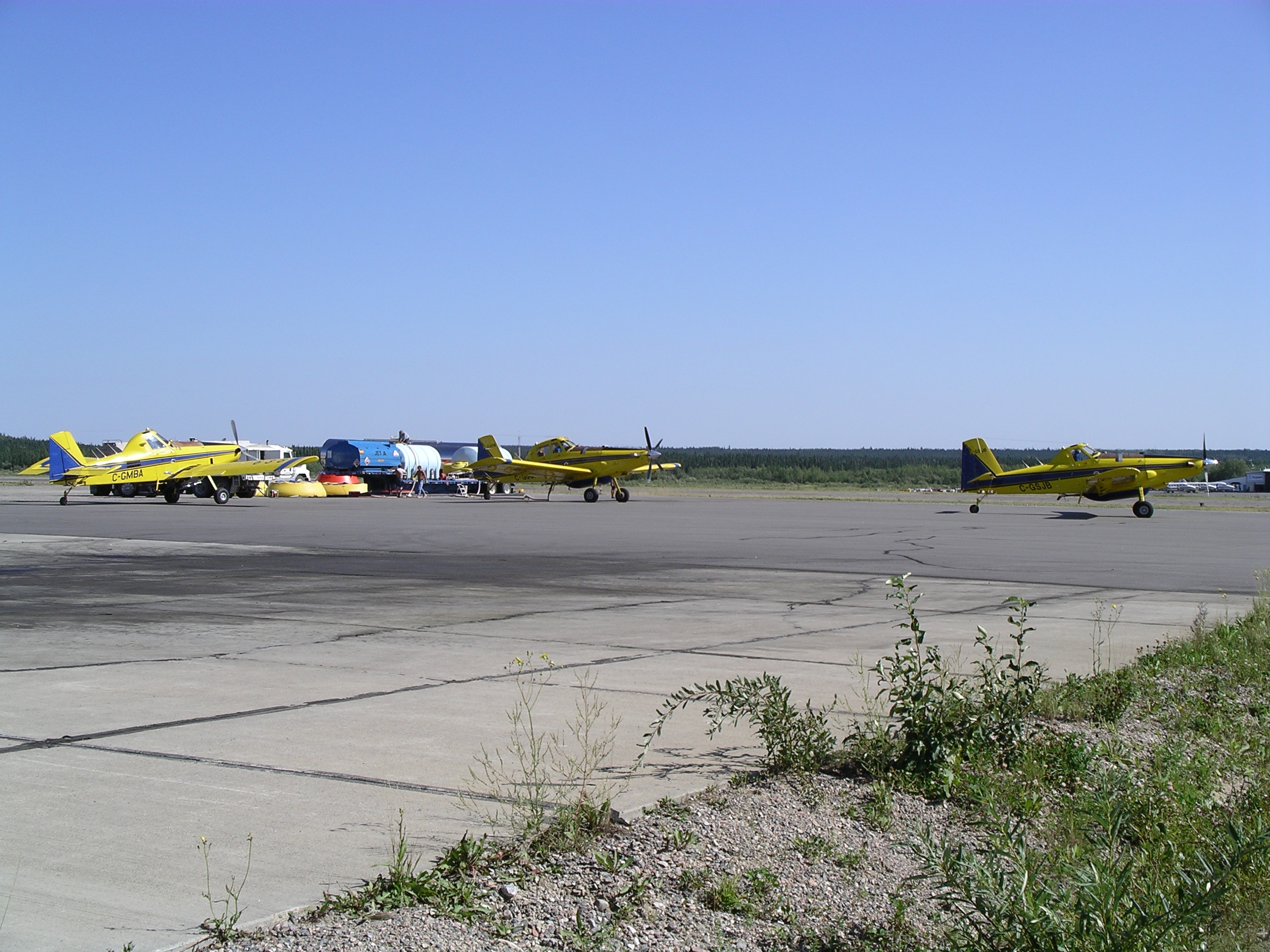
- Loading up to head to some nearby fires
- IATA: YTH; ICAO: CYTH; WMO: 71079

Summary
- Airport type: Public
- Owner/Operator: Thompson Regional Airport Authority
- Serves: Thompson, Manitoba
- Time zone: CST (UTC−06:00)
  - Summer (DST): CDT (UTC−05:00)
- Elevation AMSL: 735 ft (224 m)
- Coordinates: 55°48′17″N 097°51′45″W
- Website: www.thompsonairport.ca

Map
- Location in Manitoba CYTH (Canada)

Runways
Direction	Length		Surface
Direction	ft	m	Surface
06/24	5,800	1,768	Asphalt
15/33	5,079	1,548	Gravel

Statistics (2010)
- Aircraft movements: 36,217
- Sources: Canada Flight Supplement; Environment Canada; Movements from Statistics Canada

Thompson Municipal Airport (IATA: YTH, ICAO: CYTH) is an airport in Mystery Lake located 3 nautical miles (5.6 km; 3.5 mi) north of Thompson, Manitoba, Canada. It is the third-busiest airport in Manitoba after Winnipeg James Armstrong Richardson International Airport and Winnipeg/St. Andrews Airport.

== History ==
Thompson Airport was developed originally by the International Nickel Company in 1961 to support their mining operations and had one runway 3,000 ft (910 m) in length.

The airport was transferred to Transport Canada in 1963. It was then operated by the Local Government District of Mystery Lake until March 2000, when ownership was taken over by the Thompson Regional Airport Authority, which is the current operator.

The airport is served by Calm Air and Perimeter Aviation with flights to Winnipeg. There are also bases for Custom Helicopters, Wings Over Kississing, Fast Air Royal Canadian Mounted Police Air Services Branch and Manitoba Government Air Services. During the fire fighting season, Thompson is home to the Government Air water bombers.

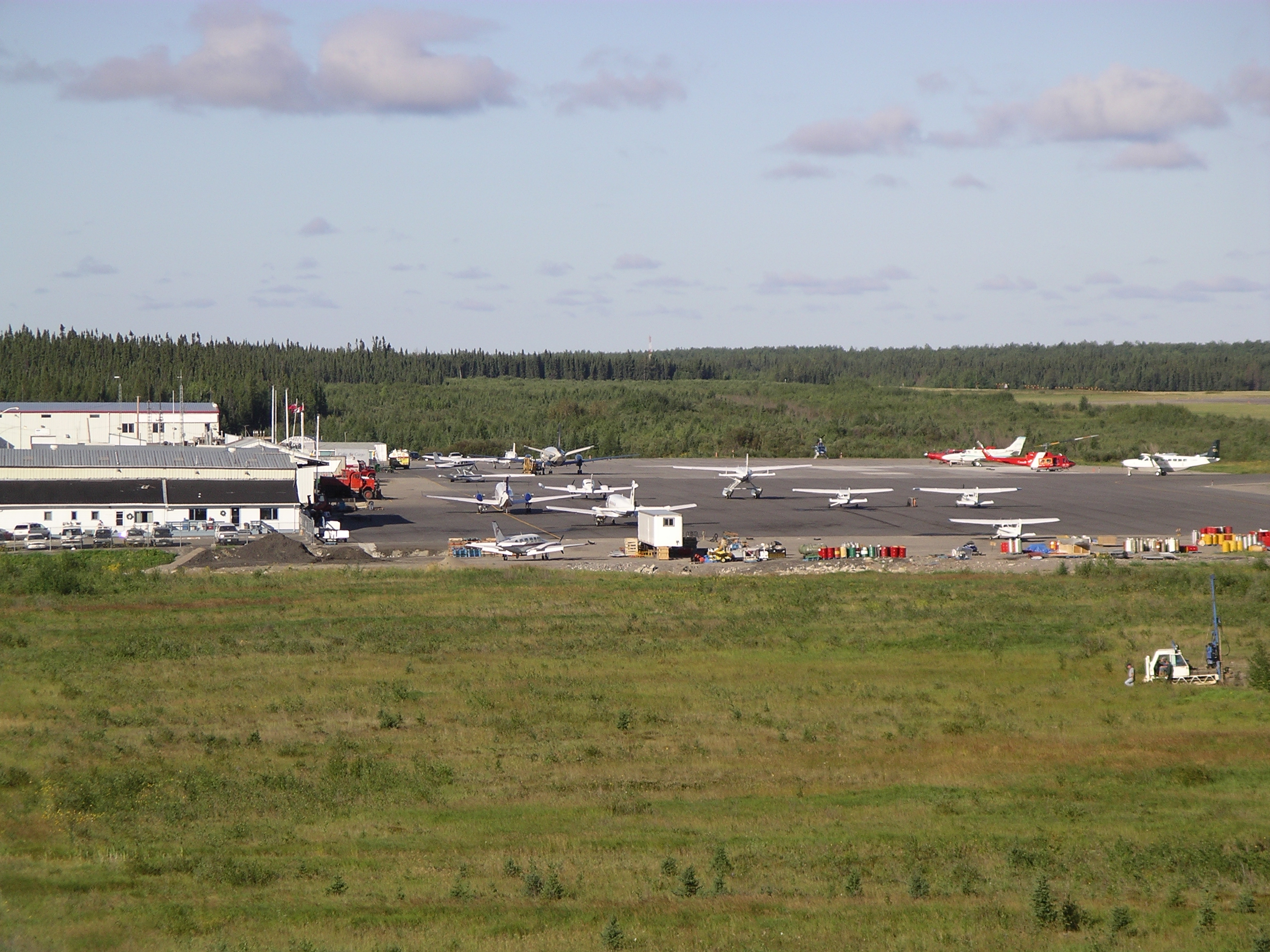

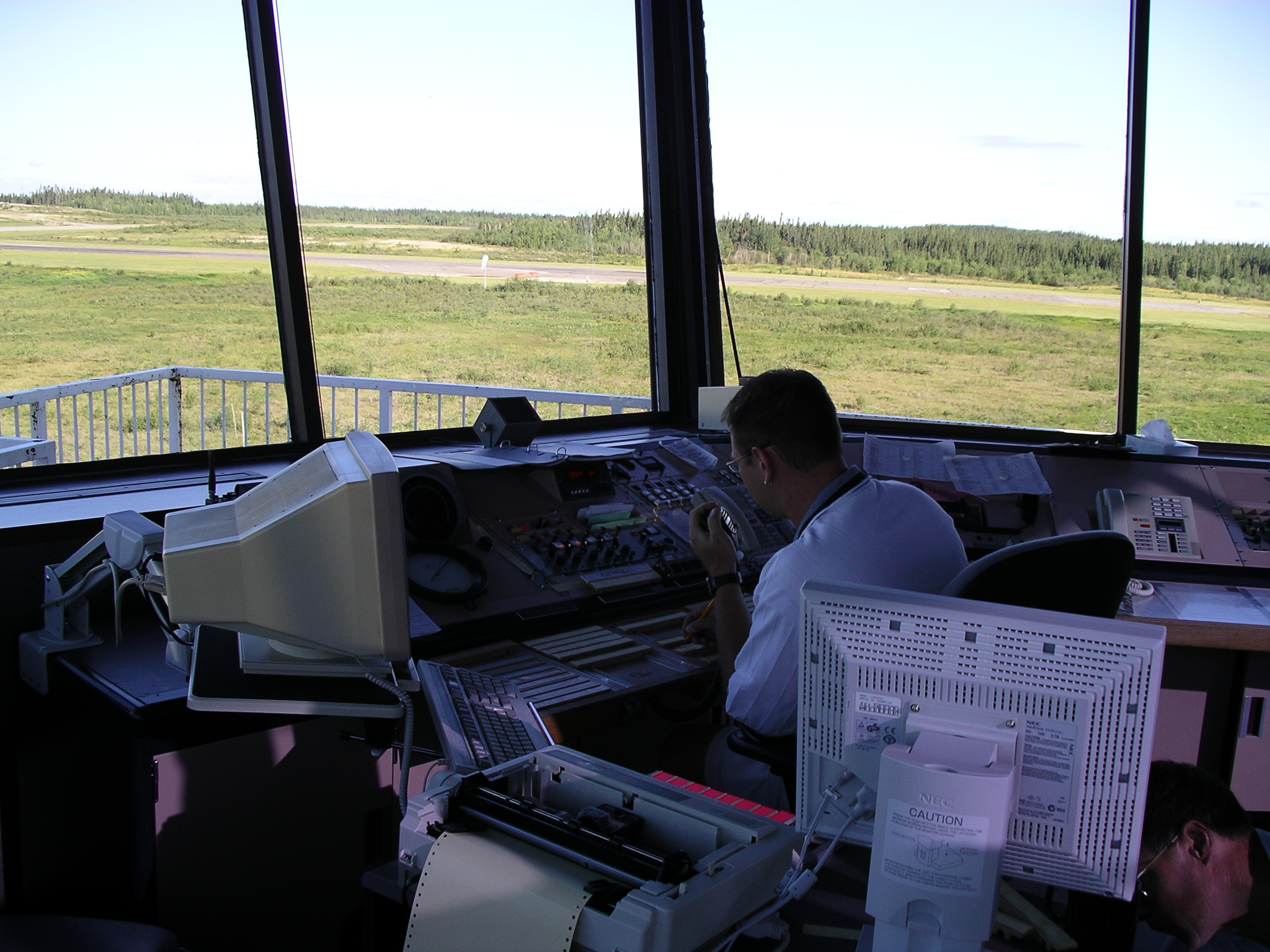
Located in the old ATC tower

== Airlines and destinations ==
=== Passenger ===
Airlines	Destinations
Calm Air	Winnipeg
Perimeter Aviation	Brochet, Gods Lake Narrows, Gods River, Lac Brochet, Oxford House, Shamattawa, Tadoule Lake, Winnipeg, York Landing

=== Cargo ===
Airlines	Destinations
North Star Air Cargo	Baker Lake, Nunavut, Chesterfield Inlet, Nunavut, Arctic Bay, Pond Inlet, Sanirajak, Igloolik, Taloyoak, Gjoa Haven, Lac Brochet, Brochet, Manitoba, Tadoule Lake, Churchill, Manitoba, York Landing

== See also ==
- List of airports in Manitoba
