= York Factory First Nation =

- ᑭᐢᒋ ᐚᐢᑳᐦᐃᑲᐣ kisci-wâskâhikan Kischi Wáskáhikan
- People: Swampy Cree
- Treaty: Treaty 5

Land
- Main reserve: York Landing

Population (2023)
- On reserve: 371
- On other land: 74
- Off reserve: 1,121
- Total population: 1,566

Government
- Chief: Darryl Wastesicoot

Tribal Council
- Keewatin Tribal Council

Website
- yffn.ca

York Landing Kawéchiwásik
- Indian reserve
- Map showing York Landing in Manitoba
- Coordinates: 56.08889°N 96.10167°W
- Country: Canada
- Province: Manitoba
- Region: Northern
- Designated as a reserve: 1989

Area
  - Land: 11.18 km^{2} (4.32 sq mi)

Population (2016)
  - Total: 443

York Factory First Nation (Cree: ᑭᐢᒋ ᐚᐢᑳᐦᐃᑲᐣ, Kischi Wáskáhikan)—sometimes referred to as York Landing First Nation or York Factory Cree Nation—is a First Nations community in northern Manitoba, Canada.

Its main reserve is York Landing (ᑲᐍᒋᐚᓯᐠ, Kawéchiwásik; 56°05′20″N 96°06′06″W), which is located along the eastern bank of the Nelson River, roughly halfway between Lake Winnipeg and Hudson Bay, as well as located 116 kilometres from Thompson, Manitoba.

As of 2016, the York Landing reserve has a population of 443 and it consists of 138 dwellings. It is served by the York Landing Airport.

== History ==
The Swampy Cree (Maškēkowak / nēhinawak) peoples of York Factory, Manitoba, were relocated to York Landing after the Hudson's Bay Company's York Factory location closed in 1957.

In 1986, the Government of Canada transferred 9.674 km^{2} (2,390.5 acres) of reserve lands at York Landing to the First Nation.

York Landing received official reserve status in 1989.

== Demographics ==
York Factory First Nation had a registered population of 1,239 (as of August 2013), with 456 members living on the 967.40 hectares reserve of York Landing. It is governed by a chief and four councillors.
