= Gods River Airport =

- IATA: ZGI; ICAO: CZGI

Summary
- Airport type: Public
- Operator: Government of Manitoba
- Location: Manto Sipi Cree Nation
- Time zone: CST (UTC−06:00)
  - Summer (DST): CDT (UTC−05:00)
- Elevation AMSL: 627 ft / 191 m
- Coordinates: 54°50′23″N 094°04′43″W

Map
- Location in Manitoba

Runways
| Direction | Length | | Surface |
| Direction | ft | m | Surface |
|---|---|---|---|
| 09/27 | 3,538 | 1,078 | Crushed rock |

Statistics (2010)
- Aircraft movements: 2,278
- Source: Canada Flight Supplement; Movements from Statistics Canada

Gods River Airport (IATA: ZGI, ICAO: CZGI) is located adjacent to Manto Sipi Cree Nation, Manitoba, Canada.

== Airlines and destinations ==
| Airlines | Destinations |
|---|---|
| Perimeter Aviation | Gods Lake Narrows, Shamattawa, Thompson, Winnipeg |
