= Shamattawa Airport =

Airport in Manitoba, Canada

- IATA: ZTM; ICAO: CZTM

Summary
- Airport type: Public
- Operator: Government of Manitoba
- Location: Shamattawa, Manitoba
- Time zone: CST (UTC−06:00)
  - Summer (DST): CDT (UTC−05:00)
- Elevation AMSL: 296 ft / 90 m
- Coordinates: 55°51′47″N 092°04′53″W

Map
- Location in Manitoba CZTM (Canada)

Runways
Direction	Length		Surface
Direction	ft	m	Surface
01/19	4,006	1,221	Gravel

Statistics (2010)
- Aircraft movements: 2,722
- Source: Canada Flight Supplement; Movements from Statistics Canada.

Shamattawa Airport (IATA: ZTM, ICAO: CZTM) is located adjacent to Shamattawa, Manitoba, Canada.

== Airlines and destinations ==
Airlines	Destinations
Perimeter Aviation	Gods River, Thompson, Winnipeg

== See also ==
- List of airports in Manitoba
