= Churchill Airport =

Airport in Manitoba, Canada

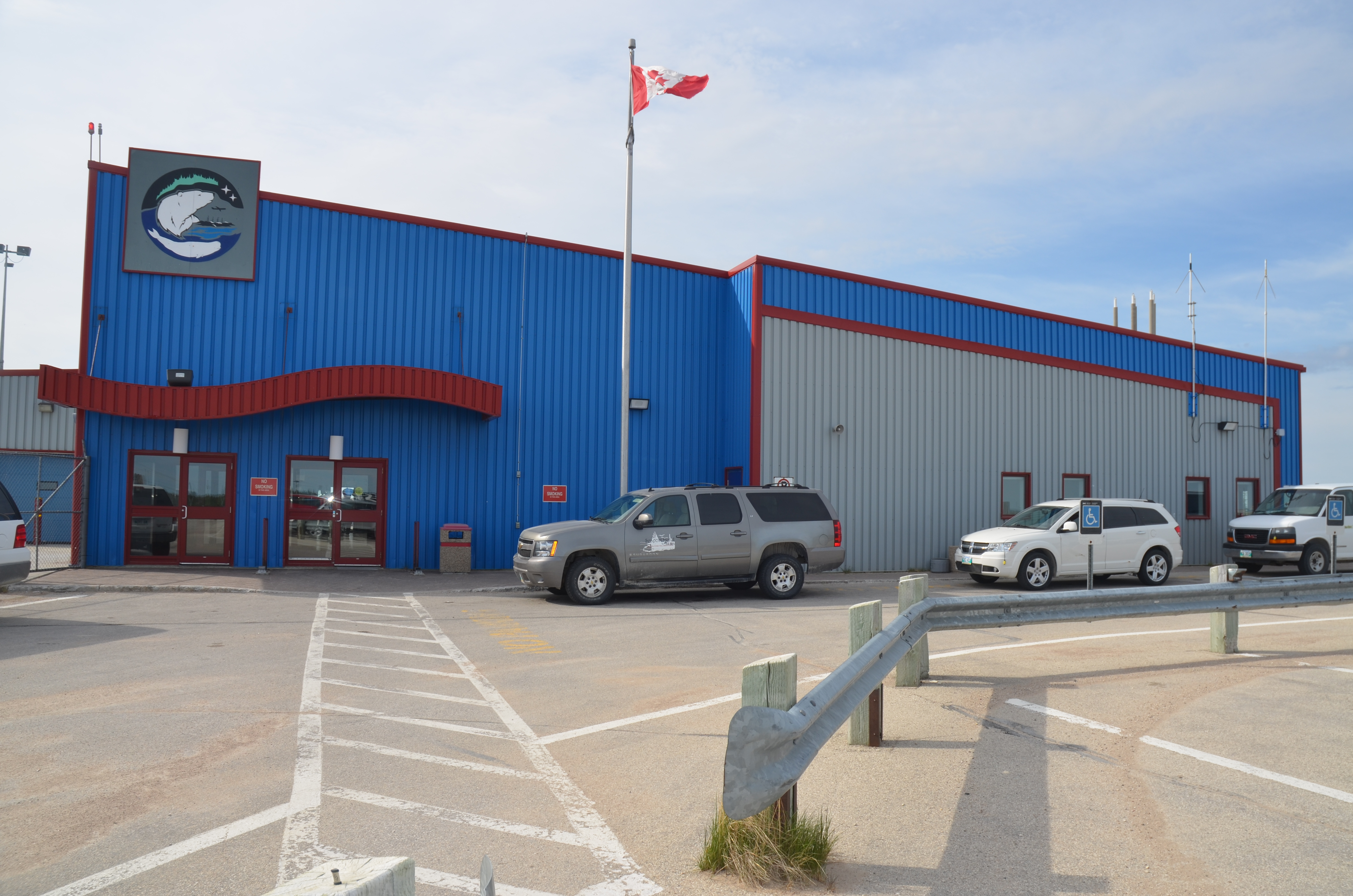
- IATA: YYQ; ICAO: CYYQ; WMO: 71913

Summary
- Airport type: Public
- Operator: Transport Canada
- Location: Churchill, Manitoba
- Time zone: CST (UTC−06:00)
  - Summer (DST): CDT (UTC−05:00)
- Elevation AMSL: 96 ft / 29 m
- Coordinates: 58°44′26″N 094°04′00″W

Map
- Location in Manitoba CYYQ (Canada)

Runways
Direction	Length		Surface
Direction	ft	m	Surface
07/25	4,000	1,219	Gravel
15/33	9,195	2,803	Asphalt

Statistics (2010)
- Aircraft movements: 10,329
- Sources: Canada Flight Supplement; Environment Canada; Movements from Statistics Canada

Churchill Airport (IATA: YYQ, ICAO: CYYQ) is located 3 nautical miles (5.6 km; 3.5 mi) east-southeast of Churchill, Manitoba, Canada. The airport serves the town of Churchill and the surrounding region. Although it is a small domestic airport, it handles a relatively high number of passengers throughout the year as Churchill is a major destination for ecotourism and scientific research. Churchill Airport also serves as a transfer airport for passengers and cargo travelling between Winnipeg and remote communities in the Kivalliq Region of Nunavut.

== History ==
The airport was originally part of the Fort Churchill military installation built by the United States Army Air Forces, with the permission of the Canadian government, during the Second World War. Facilities at Fort Churchill supported the Canadian and American operations of the nearby Churchill Rocket Research Range beginning in the 1950s. The airport at Fort Churchill later served as a Strategic Air Command base housing the 3949th Air Base Squadron of the 813th Strategic Aerospace Division. The 9,195-foot (2,803 m) asphalt runway is still maintained and the airport serves as a diversion airport for jet aircraft up to the size of a Boeing 747 or Boeing 777 that are forced to make emergency landings.

== Airlines and destinations ==
Airlines	Destinations
Calm Air	Winnipeg

== See also ==
- List of airports in Manitoba
- Churchill Water Aerodrome
- Port of Churchill
- Churchill station (Manitoba)
