= Transair (Canada) =

Canadian airline

IATA	ICAO	Call sign
TZ	TTZ	TRANSAIR
- Founded: 1956
- Ceased operations: 1979
- Operating bases: Winnipeg International Airport

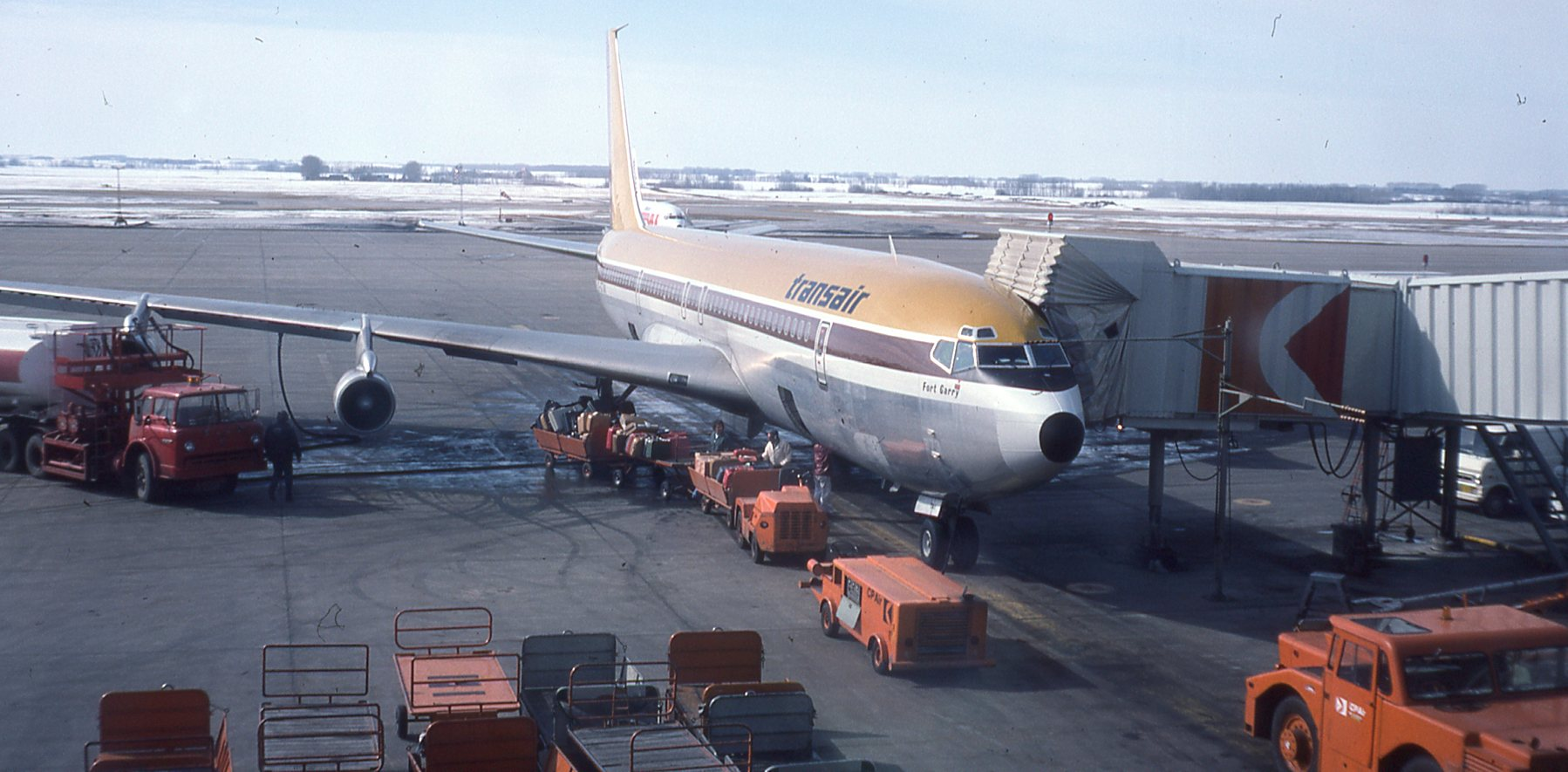
Transair Boeing 707 at Edmonton International Airport

Transair (IATA: TZ, ICAO: TTZ) was an airline based in Canada. It was purchased by Pacific Western Airlines in 1979. Transair's operational headquarters was located at the Winnipeg International Airport in Manitoba.

== History ==
Transair had its origins as Central Northern Airways (CNA) in April 1947, based in Manitoba, Canada. In 1956 it merged with Arctic Wings to form Transair Ltd. The first scheduled route to be operated was from Winnipeg to Red Lake using a Lockheed Model 14 Super Electra. The company had a mixed fleet of Curtiss C-46 Commando, Avro Anson, Avro York, de Havilland DH-89 Dragon Rapide, Lockheed Model 14 Super Electra, Bristol 170, and smaller Cessna, Noorduyn Norseman, and Waco aircraft. In 1955 CNA took over Arctic Wings and with the merger the name was changed to Transair in 1956. With expansion came the Douglas DC-3 and Douglas DC-4 in 1957. As Transair continued to grow, more routes were awarded and Douglas DC-6Bs and Douglas DC-7Cs were introduced to the fleet.

By 1964, the airline was serving both Montreal and Ottawa in eastern Canada with scheduled weekly passenger flights operated with DC-4 aircraft to Churchill, Manitoba located on Hudson Bay via a stop in Winisk, Ontario.

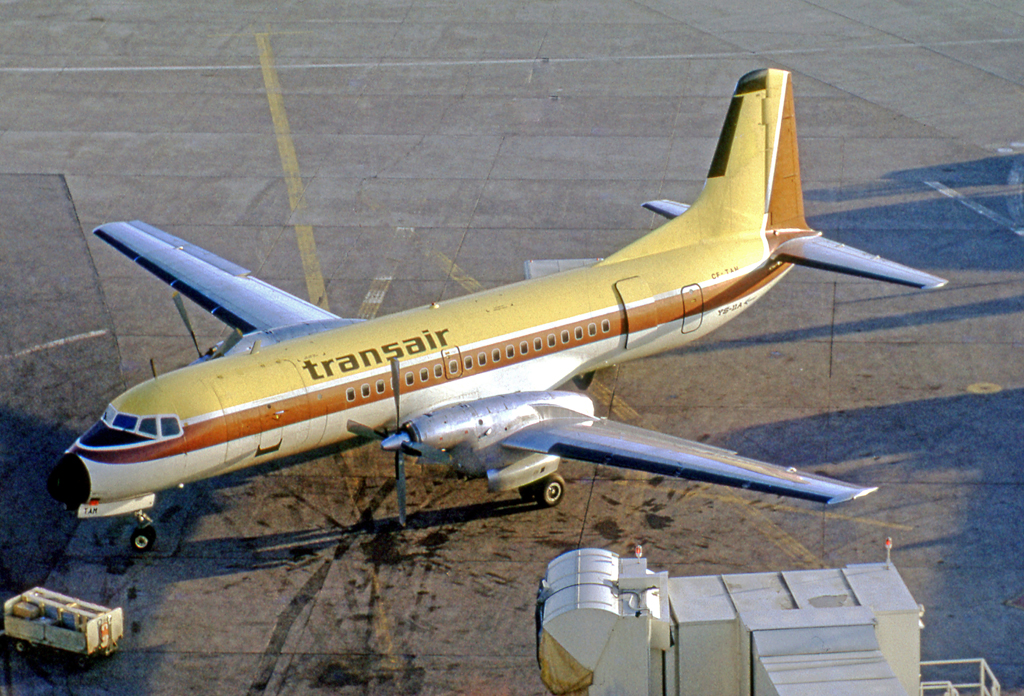
Transair NAMC YS-11A turboprop airliner at Toronto (Malton) Airport in 1971

Also in 1964, Transair was operating scheduled passenger flights with Vickers Viscount turboprop airliners with service between Winnipeg and Churchill, Manitoba, Dauphin, Manitoba, Flin Flon, Manitoba and Lynn Lake, Manitoba. By 1965 the airline had commenced international charter flights using its Douglas DC-6Bs and DC-7Cs propliners. In 1968 it began to operate feeder flights for Air Canada and CP Air with the introduction of de Havilland Canada DHC-6 Twin Otter and NAMC YS-11 turboprop aircraft. Another turboprop airliner operated by Transair was the Hawker Siddeley HS 748. Transair acquired Winnipeg-based Midwest Airlines in 1969.

In April 1973, Transair, then Canada's fourth largest airline, hired Rosella Bjornson as its first female First Officer. Bjornson flew the Fokker F28 jet. She was the first woman member of the Canadian Air Line Pilots Association.

International expansion brought the introduction of jet aircraft in the form of the Boeing 737-200 in May 1970. The 737-200 jetliner was used to provide charter flights to Florida, the Caribbean and Mexico, and also operated scheduled passenger services in Canada. In 1972 the Fokker F28 Fellowship twinjet was introduced into scheduled service on Canadian routes followed by the intercontinental version of the Boeing 707 a year later. The Boeing 707-320C was used strictly for charter flights, primarily to international destinations. By 1976 the scheduled route network extended throughout Canada from Toronto in the east to Whitehorse in the west with charter flights being operated to Europe, Mexico, the Caribbean, Hawaii, Florida and other destinations in the U.S.

According to the February 1976 edition of the North American Official Airline Guide (OAG), Transair was operating daily scheduled service with either Boeing 737 or Fokker F28 aircraft direct between Toronto (YYZ) and Winnipeg (YWG), with intermediate stops in Sault Ste. Marie (YAM), Thunder Bay (YQT) and Dryden (YHD). One stop, direct jet service was flown as well six days a week from Toronto to Winnipeg via Thunder Bay. Another scheduled route flown by Transair with the Boeing 737 jetliner at this time from Winnipeg served the Resolute Bay Airport (YRB) in far-northern arctic Canada. Resolute is located approximately 1,700 kilometers (1060 miles) from the North Pole and is the second-northernmost destination in Canada to receive scheduled passenger airline service (Griese Fjord is slightly farther north.) Also, according to the OAG at this time, Transair was operating scheduled jet service with the Boeing 737 and/or Fokker F28 between its Winnipeg hub and Churchill (YYQ), Flin Flon (YFO), Gillam (YGX), Lynn Lake (YYL), The Pas (YQD), Thompson (YTH) and Yellowknife (YZF), with Whitehorse (YXY) being added by that spring. In 1973 The Airport in Dryden Ontario had a gravel strip. The route to Dryden was serviced by the 737-200.

In 1977 Pacific Western Airlines bought most of the shares of Transair. Considerable financial losses then led to a reduction in flight operations. As losses continued, the licences and routes were transferred to Pacific Western Airlines on 1 December 1979 and Transair ceased to exist.

== Destinations in 1976 ==
According to the May 25, 1976 Transair route system map, the airline was operating scheduled passenger service to the following destinations in Canada. Also in 1976, Transair was operating scheduled jet service with the Boeing 737-200 and/or Fokker F28 Fellowship into those destinations noted in bold typeface:

- Baker Lake
- Chesterfield Inlet
- **Churchill**
- Coral Harbour
- **Dryden**
- Eskimo Point
- **Flin Flon**
- **Gillam**
- Hall Beach
- Kenora
- **Lynn Lake**
- Norway House
- Rankin Inlet
- Red Lake
- Repulse Bay
- **Resolute**
- **Sault Ste. Marie**
- **The Pas**
- **Thompson**
- **Thunder Bay**
- **Toronto**
- Whale Cove
- **Whitehorse**
- **Winnipeg** - Hub and airline headquarters
- **Yellowknife**

According to the Official Airline Guide (OAG), by early 1979 Transair had begun operating direct one stop, no change of plane Boeing 737-200 jet service between Winnipeg and Calgary and also between Winnipeg and Edmonton (via Edmonton International Airport) with these flights making an en route intermediate stop at either Regina or Saskatoon.

== Fleet ==
Transair operated the following aircraft at various times during its existence:

Jet aircraft

- Boeing 707-320C (flown on charter services)
- Boeing 737-200 (B737-2A9 model)
- Fokker F28 Fellowship

Turboprop aircraft

- Armstrong Whitworth AW.660 Argosy
- de Havilland Canada DHC-6 Twin Otter
- Hawker Siddeley HS 748
- NAMC YS-11
- Vickers Viscount (series 724 model)

Piston aircraft

- Avro Anson
- Avro York
- Bristol 170 Freighter
- Consolidated PBY-5A
- Curtiss C-46 Commando
- de Havilland Dragon Rapide
- Douglas DC-3 (includes C-47 model)
- Douglas DC-4
- Douglas DC-6B
- Douglas DC-7C
- Lockheed Model 14 Super Electra
- Vultee PBY flying boat
- Waco YKC-S

== Accidents and incidents ==
- On 7 October 1970, Douglas C-47 CF-TAR was reported to have been written off.

== See also ==
- History of aviation in Canada
- List of defunct airlines of Canada
