= Chesterfield Inlet Airport =

- IATA: YCS; ICAO: CYCS

Summary
- Airport type: Public
- Operator: Government of Nunavut
- Location: Chesterfield Inlet, Nunavut
- Time zone: CST (UTC−06:00)
  - Summer (DST): CDT (UTC−05:00)
- Elevation AMSL: 32 ft / 10 m
- Coordinates: 63°20′50″N 090°43′52″W

Map
- Location in Nunavut CYCS (Canada)

Runways
Direction	Length		Surface
Direction	ft	m	Surface
12/30	3,600	1,097	Gravel

Statistics (2010)
- Aircraft movements: 1,426
- Source: Canada Flight Supplement; Movements from Statistics Canada.

Chesterfield Inlet Airport (IATA: YCS, ICAO: CYCS) is located 1 nautical mile (1.9 km; 1.2 mi) northwest of Chesterfield Inlet, Nunavut, Canada, and is operated by the government of Nunavut.

The old terminal building was constructed more than 40 years ago and was replaced by a new terminal building that has a larger waiting area, new luggage area and wheelchair accessible. Cost is split nearly evenly between Government of Nunavut and Government of Canada through the National Trade Corridors Fund. The new terminal opened on April 16, 2025.

== Airlines and destinations ==
Airlines	Destinations
Calm Air	Rankin Inlet
Nolinor Aviation	Charter: Meadowbank
