= Chesterfield Inlet, Nunavut =

Chesterfield Inlet ᐃᒡᓗᓕᒑᕐᔪᒃ Igluligaarjuk
- Hamlet
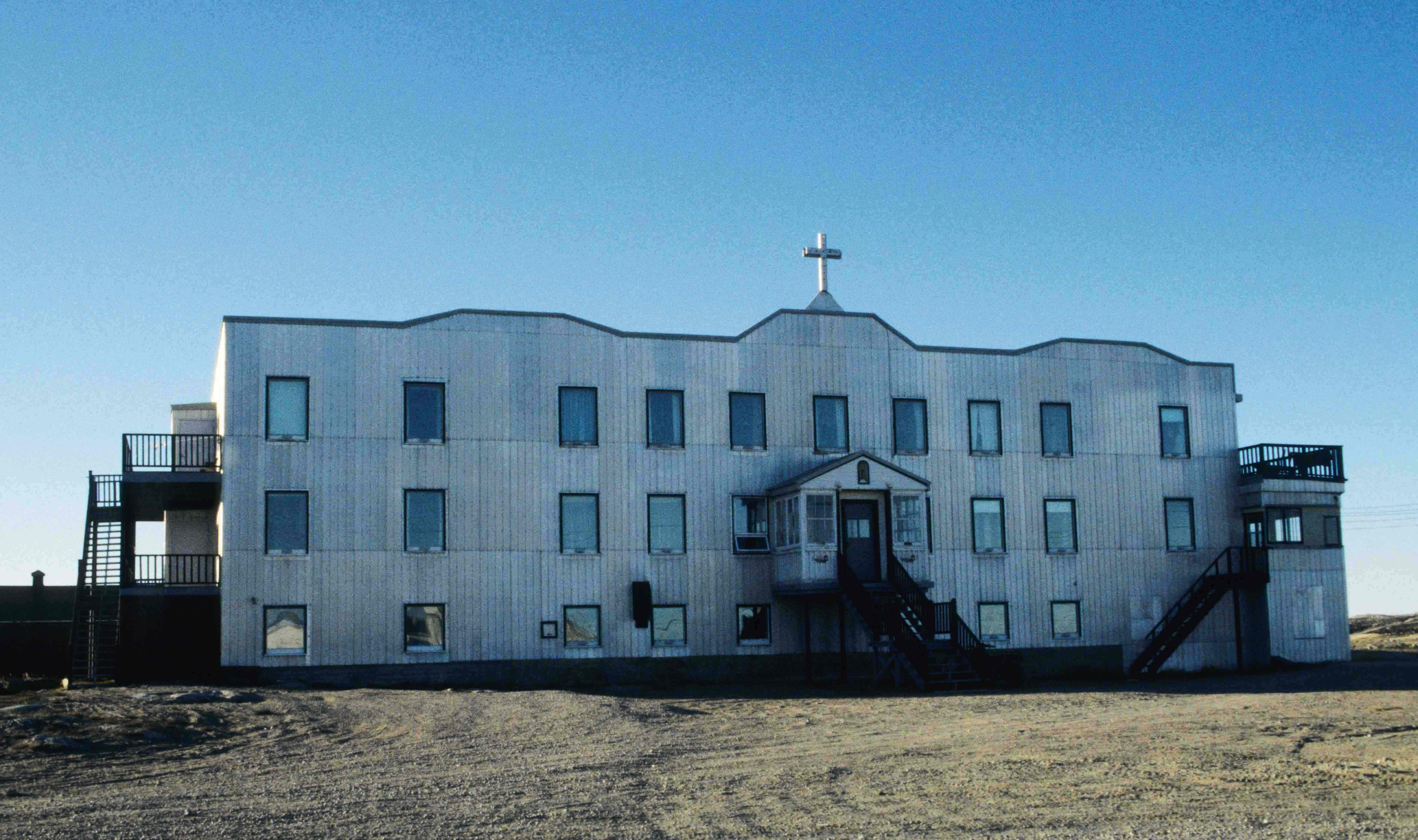
- Chesterfield Inlet Mission Hospital

- Location within Nunavut Location within Canada
- Coordinates: 63°20′20″N 090°42′05″W
- Country: Canada
- Territory: Nunavut
- Region: Kivalliq
- Electoral district: Rankin Inlet North-Chesterfield Inlet
- Settled: 1911, Hudson's Bay Company post
- Incorporated (hamlet): 1 April 1980

Government
  - Mayor: Barnie Aggark
  - Senior Administrative Officer: Richard Van Horne
  - MLA: Alexander Sammurtok

Area (2021)
  - Total: 139.49 km^{2} (53.86 sq mi)
- Elevation: 11 m (36 ft)

Population (2021)
  - Total: 397
  - Density: 2.85/km^{2} (7.37/sq mi)
- Time zone: UTC−06:00 (CST)
  - Summer (DST): UTC−05:00 (CDT)
- Canadian Postal code: X0C 0B0
- Area code: 867
- Website: chesterfield-inlet.ca/

Chesterfield Inlet (Inuktitut: ᐃᒡᓗᓕᒑᕐᔪᒃ, romanized: Igluligaarjuk) is a hamlet located on the western shore of Hudson Bay, Kivalliq Region, in Nunavut, Canada, at the mouth of Chesterfield Inlet. Igluligaarjuk is the Inuktitut word for "place with few houses", it is the oldest community in Nunavut. The community is served by air, Chesterfield Inlet Airport, and by an annual supply known as sealift.

Inuit from the Chesterfield Inlet region are called Qaernermiut, though previously, they were referred to as Kenepitic, Kenepetu or Kenepitu.

== Demographics ==
Federal census population history of Chesterfield Inlet
Year	Pop.	±%
1976	243	—
1981	249	+2.5%
1986	294	+18.1%
1991	316	+7.5%
1996	337	+6.6%
2001	345	+2.4%
2006	332	−3.8%
2011	313	−5.7%
2016	437	+39.6%
2021	397	−9.2%
Source: Statistics Canada

In the 2021 Canadian census conducted by Statistics Canada, Chesterfield Inlet had a population of 397 living in 116 of its 131 total private dwellings, a change of −9.2% from its 2016 population of 437. With a land area of 139.49 km^{2} (53.86 sq mi), it had a population density of 2.8/km^{2} (7.4/sq mi) in 2021.

== Climate ==
Chesterfield Inlet has a subarctic climate (Dfc) with short but cool summers and long cold winters.

Climate data for Chesterfield Inlet (Chesterfield Inlet Airport) Climate ID: 2300707; coordinates 63°20′49″N 90°43′52″W; elevation: 9.8 m (32 ft); 1981–2010 normals
Month	Jan	Feb	Mar	Apr	May	Jun	Jul	Aug	Sep	Oct	Nov	Dec	Year
Record high humidex	−7.4	−8.0	1.6	1.5	12.6	23.8	35.4	37.0	20.8	12.1	1.4	0.2	37.0
Record high °C (°F)	−3.0 (26.6)	−5.5 (22.1)	2.0 (35.6)	3.5 (38.3)	14.0 (57.2)	26.0 (78.8)	30.5 (86.9)	27.0 (80.6)	22.0 (71.6)	10.0 (50.0)	2.0 (35.6)	−2.0 (28.4)	30.5 (86.9)
Mean daily maximum °C (°F)	−27.3 (−17.1)	−26.9 (−16.4)	−20.6 (−5.1)	−11.1 (12.0)	−2.3 (27.9)	7.9 (46.2)	15.2 (59.4)	12.7 (54.9)	5.7 (42.3)	−1.8 (28.8)	−12.7 (9.1)	−21.1 (−6.0)	−6.9 (19.6)
Daily mean °C (°F)	−30.9 (−23.6)	−30.8 (−23.4)	−25.1 (−13.2)	−15.8 (3.6)	−5.7 (21.7)	4.3 (39.7)	10.6 (51.1)	9.2 (48.6)	3.3 (37.9)	−4.5 (23.9)	−16.7 (1.9)	−25.2 (−13.4)	−10.6 (12.9)
Mean daily minimum °C (°F)	−34.3 (−29.7)	−34.2 (−29.6)	−29.4 (−20.9)	−20.1 (−4.2)	−9.0 (15.8)	0.5 (32.9)	5.9 (42.6)	5.7 (42.3)	0.9 (33.6)	−7.0 (19.4)	−20.7 (−5.3)	−29.1 (−20.4)	−14.2 (6.4)
Record low °C (°F)	−46.0 (−50.8)	−49.0 (−56.2)	−45.0 (−49.0)	−35.5 (−31.9)	−29.0 (−20.2)	−11.5 (11.3)	−1.5 (29.3)	−2.0 (28.4)	−9.0 (15.8)	−26.0 (−14.8)	−37.5 (−35.5)	−44.0 (−47.2)	−49.0 (−56.2)
Record low wind chill	−66.3	−70.7	−64.7	−50.5	−33.6	−18.3	0.0	−9.5	−17.9	−40.1	−54.6	−60.9	−70.7
Average precipitation mm (inches)	10.4 (0.41)	9.6 (0.38)	14.9 (0.59)	15.5 (0.61)	15.1 (0.59)	23.3 (0.92)	41.2 (1.62)	51.2 (2.02)	37.4 (1.47)	26.6 (1.05)	22.0 (0.87)	14.0 (0.55)	281.2 (11.07)
Average rainfall mm (inches)	0.0 (0.0)	0.0 (0.0)	0.0 (0.0)	0.1 (0.00)	6.1 (0.24)	19.7 (0.78)	41.2 (1.62)	51.2 (2.02)	33.9 (1.33)	11.7 (0.46)	0.0 (0.0)	0.0 (0.0)	163.9 (6.45)
Average snowfall cm (inches)	11.2 (4.4)	10.2 (4.0)	15.0 (5.9)	17.0 (6.7)	9.4 (3.7)	3.7 (1.5)	0.0 (0.0)	0.0 (0.0)	3.5 (1.4)	15.0 (5.9)	23.1 (9.1)	15.4 (6.1)	123.6 (48.7)
Average precipitation days (≥ 0.2 mm)	4.2	3.7	4.3	5.0	4.9	6.0	7.9	9.9	9.7	8.8	7.6	5.4	77.3
Average rainy days (≥ 0.2 mm)	0.0	0.0	0.0	0.1	1.6	5.4	7.9	9.9	8.4	3.4	0.0	0.0	36.6
Average snowy days (≥ 0.2 cm)	4.2	3.7	4.4	4.9	3.3	0.7	0.0	0.0	1.5	5.7	7.7	5.4	41.4
Average relative humidity (%)	79.0	67.6	74.9	82.0	84.4	70.9	68.0	72.5	77.4	87.3	83.0	75.3	76.9
Source: Environment and Climate Change Canada Canadian Climate Normals 1981–2010

== See also ==
- List of municipalities in Nunavut
- Charlie Panigoniak
- Kiviaq
- Aivilingmiut
- Ukkusiksalik National Park
- Caribou Inuit
