= Shamrock Summit =

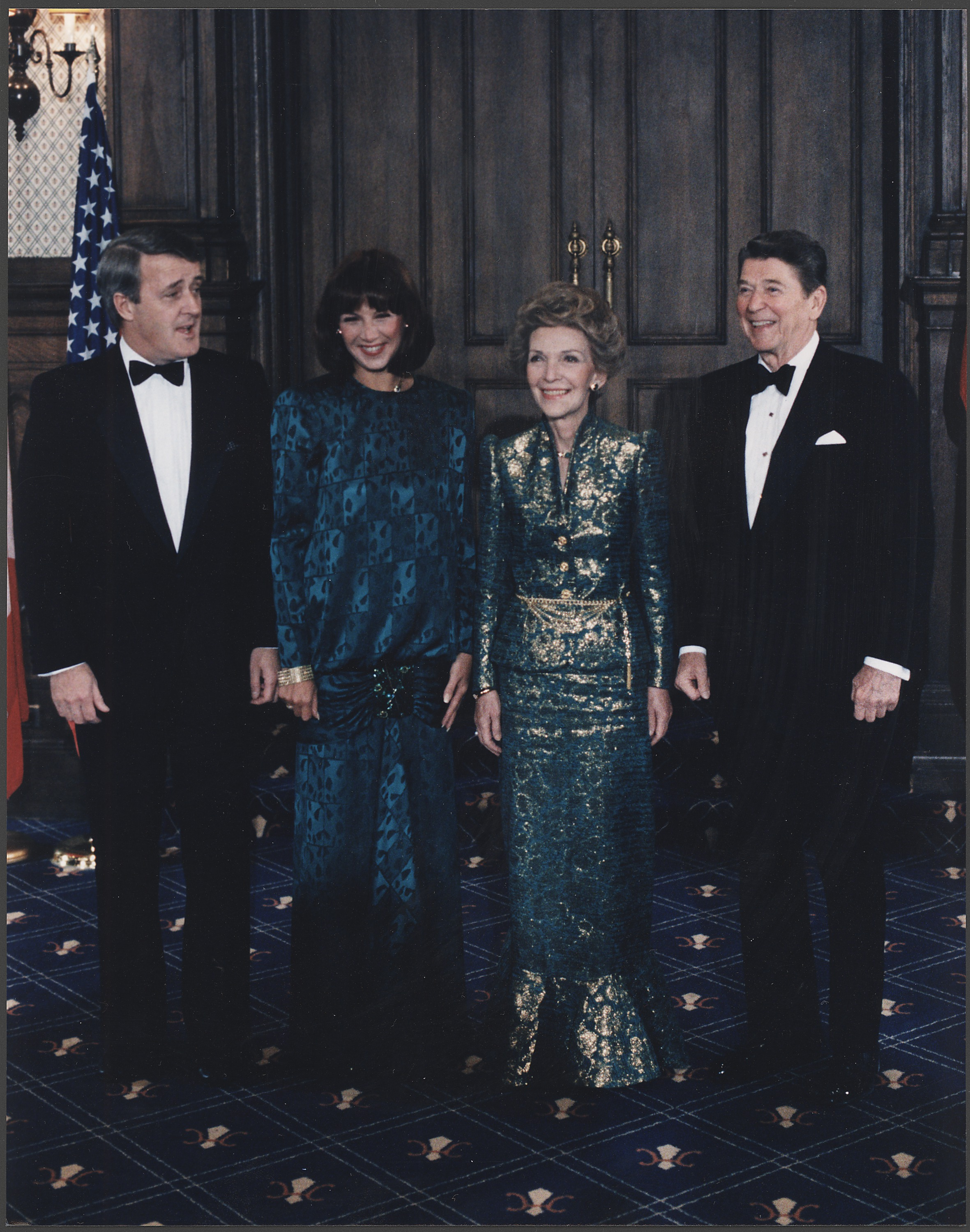
The Mulroneys and Reagans in Quebec City, Canada, March 18, 1985, the second day of the summit.

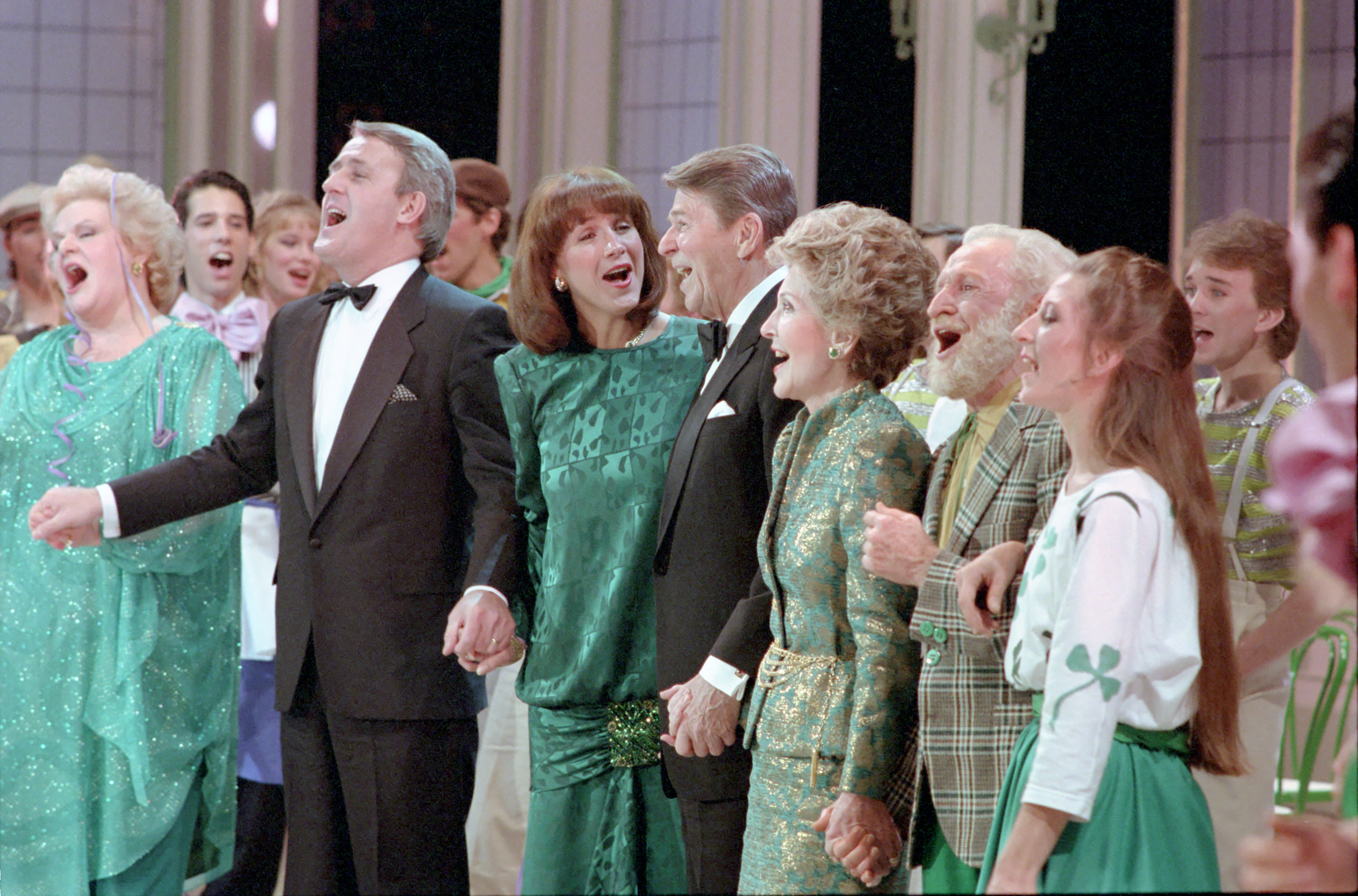
The Mulroneys and Reagans singing "When Irish Eyes Are Smiling" at the Grand Théâtre de Québec in Quebec City, Canada, March 18, 1985.

The Shamrock Summit was the colloquial name given to the March 17–18, 1985 meeting between Canadian Prime Minister Brian Mulroney and US President Ronald Reagan in Quebec City. It gained this nickname because of the Irish background of the two leaders and because the meeting started on St. Patrick's Day. The summit was capped by a televised gala, which ended with Mulroney, Reagan and their wives singing "When Irish Eyes Are Smiling" at the Grand Théâtre de Québec, which publicly exemplified the camaraderie between the two leaders.

American officials saw the summit as a chance to mend relations between the two countries in the post-Pierre Trudeau era.

Among the many issues discussed in a busy 24-hour schedule were military planning, upgrading the DEW line to use modern electronics, a landmark agreement on the control of acid rain, and the formal signing of the Pacific Salmon Treaty and the "Canada-US Declaration on Goods and Services", the first major step towards the 1988 Canada-U.S. Free Trade Agreement.

== Background ==
Mulroney enjoyed a close friendship with Reagan, as both considered themselves conservatives politically and shared a common agenda, notably on free trade. This relationship bred some resentment among those who felt it was improper for Canadian-US relations to be too intimate. Canadian historian Jack Granatstein said that this "public display of sucking up to Reagan may have been the single most demeaning moment in the entire political history of Canada's relations with the United States."
