= South Beach Casino =

Casino hotel in Scanterbury, Manitoba, Canada

South Beach Casino & Resort

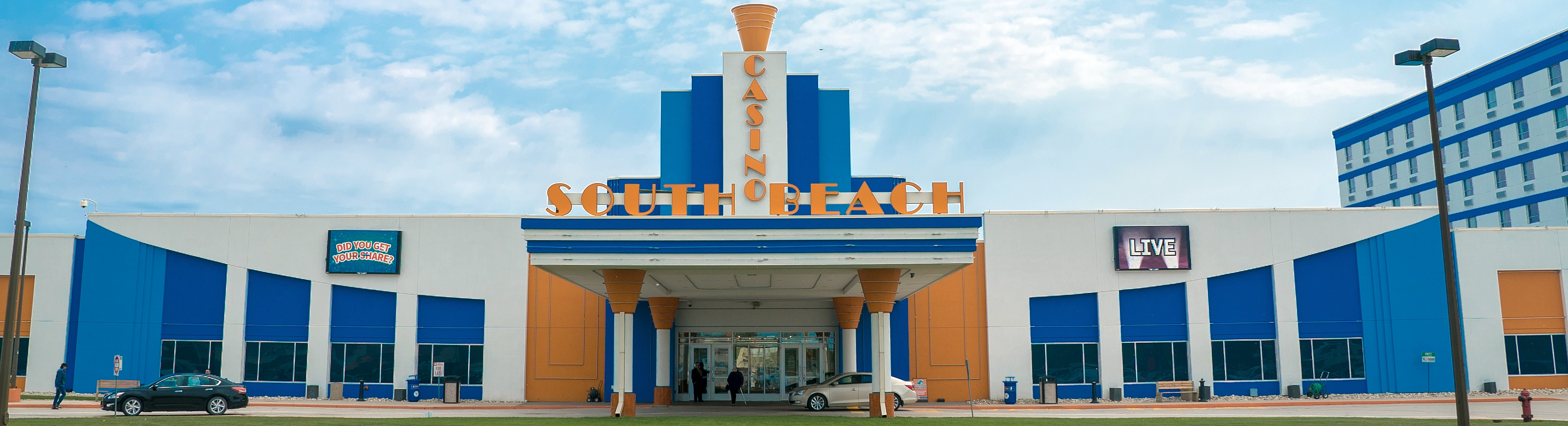
- South Beach Casino & Resort, 2019

- Interactive map of South Beach Casino & Resort
- Address: 1 Ocean Dr, Scanterbury, MB, R0E 1W0
- Opening date: May 28, 2005
- Owner: Southeast Resource Development Council Corp.
- Coordinates: 50.36124°N 96.62216°W
- Website: southbeachcasino.ca

South Beach Casino & Resort, often simply referred to as South Beach, is a casino hotel located in Scanterbury, Manitoba, and is one of three First Nation-owned casinos in the province. It is situated on Manitoba Highway 59, 70 km (43 mi), or one hour, northeast of Winnipeg.

It began operating on 28 May 2005, and is owned by the 7 Manitoba First Nations of the Southeast Resource Development Council Corp tribal council.

== Ownership and management ==
South Beach is owned by seven Manitoba First Nations that fall under the umbrella of the Southeast Resource Development Council Corp: Black River First Nation, Bloodvein First Nation, Brokenhead Ojibway Nation, Hollow Water First Nation, Little Grand Rapids First Nation, Pauingassi First Nation, and Poplar River First Nation.

The community of Scanterbury itself falls within the boundaries of Brokenhead 4, the main reserve of Brokenhead Ojibway Nation.

South Beach was developed by a Minnesota-based company called Hemisphere Gaming, with whom the casino has a management agreement with until 2028.

The seven First Nations collectively sought out a loan to help fund and build the casino and resort. This was considered a high-risk venture and no one was willing to assist in its development. Hemisphere was the only company that was willing to fund and help build South Beach Casino and Resort.

== Casino ==
The casino has roughly 3,700 m^{2} (40,000 sq ft) of space. It is a smoke-free environment. It operates 600 slot machines, blackjack tables, and other gambling tables.

== Resort ==
The resort portion of South Beach is in operation 365 days a year. It is fashioned in an Art-Deco design and tropical motif featuring a range of rooms which go from standard or deluxe rooms all the way to "grand" suites. It features a "tropical" pool and cascading "waterfall", various ball/convention rooms, a restaurant, and a lounge featuring live entertainment.

== See also ==
- List of casinos in Canada
