= First Nations in Manitoba =

Indigenous nations in the Canadian province

First Nations in Manitoba constitute of over 160,000 registered persons as of 2021, about 57% of whom live on reserve. Manitoba is second to Ontario in total on-reserve population and in total First Nation population.

There are 63 First Nations in the province and five indigenous linguistic groups. The languages are Nēhiyawēwin, Ojibwe, Dakota, Oji-Cree, and Dene.

First Nations are listed by common usage names but other names may be applied in certain areas; for example, "Cree Nation" and "First Nation" is applied to certain bands on the same reserve.

== Demographics ==
As of March 2021, there were 164,289 registered First Nation persons in Manitoba, 57.1% of whom (93,840) live on reserve.

There are 63 First Nations in Manitoba, including 6 of the 20 largest bands in Canada.

=== Knowledge of language ===
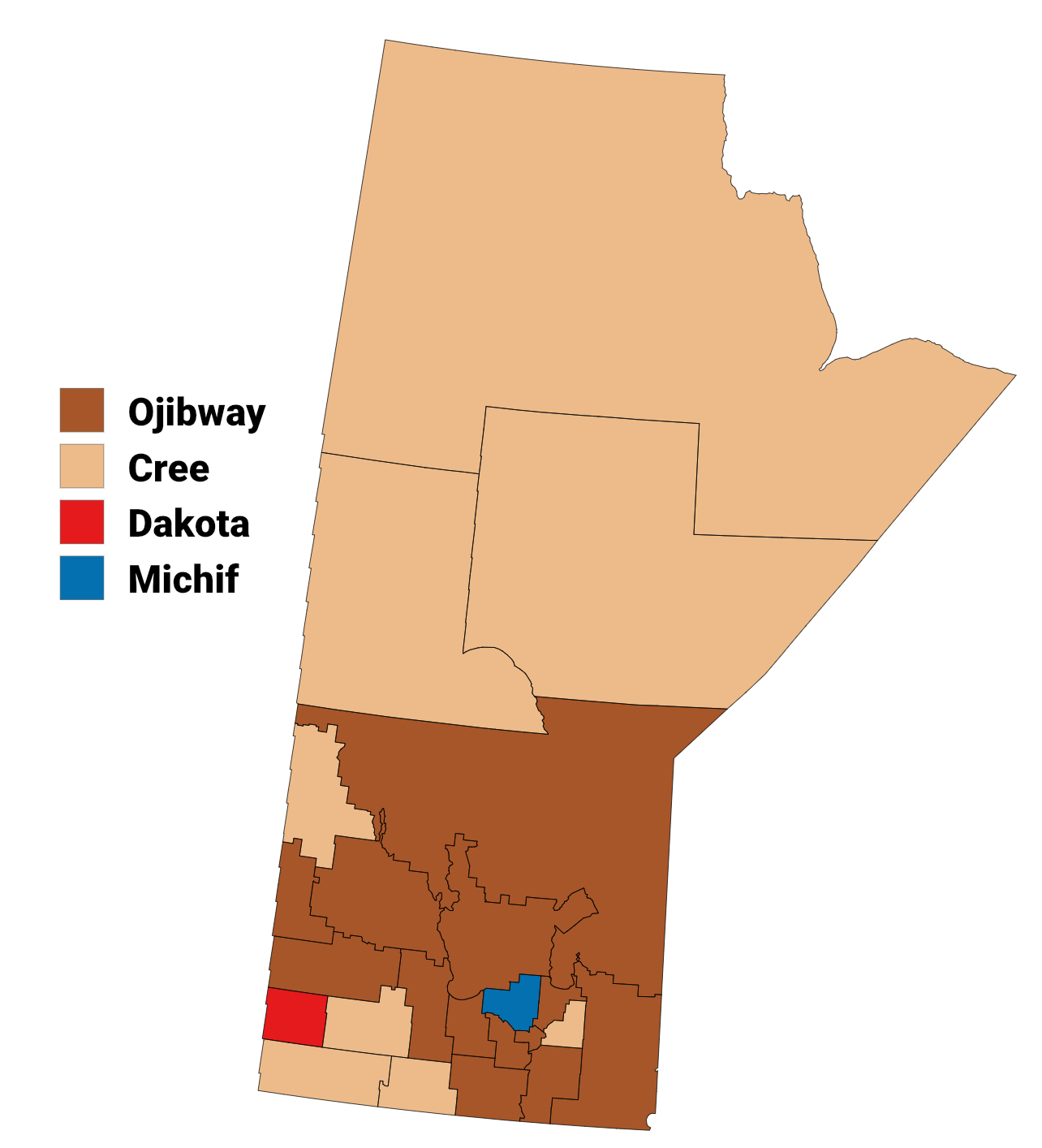
Largest First Nations knowledge of language in Manitoba, 2021 census

There are 5 Indigenous linguistic groups in the province: Cree, Ojibway, Dakota, Oji-Cree, and Dene.

== Governance ==
There are 7 First Nations treaties in the province:

- Treaty 1 in the south-central region
- Treaty 2 in the central and southwestern region
- Treaty 3 in the southeastern region
- Treaty 4 in part of west-central Manitoba
- Treaty 5 (1875 and 1908) in the central and northern regions
- Treaty 6 in the northern region
- Treaty 10 along northwestern Manitoba

The Dakota Nations (Birdtail Sioux, Sioux Valley, Canupawakpa, Dakota Tipi, and Dakota Plains) are not signatory to any treaty with Canada, though their land is considered reserve land under the Indian Act. There are seven First Nations tribal councils in Manitoba:

- Dakota Ojibway Tribal Council
- Interlake Reserves Tribal Council
- Island Lake Tribal Council
- Keewatin Tribal Council
- Southeast Resource Development Council
- Swampy Cree Tribal Council
- West Region Tribal Council

Cross Lake, Dakota Tipi, Fisher River, Sagkeeng, Nisichawayasihk, Norway House, O-Pipon-Na-Piwin, and Tootinaowaziibeeng have no tribal council affiliations.

Additionally, First Nations in Manitoba are represented by 3 active provincial political organizations divided on a north–south basis: the Assembly of Manitoba Chiefs, Manitoba Keewatinowi Okimakanak, and the Southern Chiefs Organization.

Manitoba Indigenous Reconciliation and Northern Relations is the department of the Manitoba government responsible for issues related to Indigenous affairs and reconciliation in the province.

== Geography ==
Seventeen First Nations are not accessible by an all-weather road. This accounts for approximately half of all First Nations people who live on reserve in Manitoba.

=== Reserves in Manitoba ===
There are about 63 reserves in Manitoba:

- Barren Lands First Nation
- Berens River First Nation
- Birdtail Sioux First Nation
- Bloodvein First Nation
- Brokenhead Ojibway Nation
- Buffalo Point First Nation
- Bunibonibee Cree Nation
- Canupawakpa Dakota First Nation
- Chemawawin Cree Nation
- Cross Lake First Nation
- Dakota Plains First Nation
- Dakota Tipi First Nation
- Dauphin River First Nation
- Ebb and Flow First Nation
- Fairford First Nation
- Fisher River Cree Nation
- Fox Lake Cree Nation
- Gamblers First Nation
- Garden Hill First Nation
- God's Lake First Nation
- Grand Rapids First Nation
- Hollow Water First Nation
- Keeseekoowenin Ojibway First Nation
- Kinonjeoshtegon First Nation
- Lake Manitoba First Nation
- Lake St. Martin First Nation
- Little Black River First Nation
- Little Grand Rapids First Nation
- Little Saskatchewan First Nation
- Long Plain First Nation
- Manto Sipi Cree Nation
- Marcel Colomb First Nation
- Mathias Colomb First Nation
- Mosakahiken Cree Nation
- Nisichawayasihk Cree Nation
- Northlands First Nation
- Norway House Cree Nation
- O-Chi-Chak-Ko-Sipi First Nation
- Opaskwayak Cree Nation
- Pauingassi First Nation
- Peguis First Nation
- Pinaymootang First Nation
- Pine Creek First Nation
- Poplar River First Nation
- Red Sucker Lake First Nation
- Rolling River First Nation
- Roseau River Anishinabe First Nation
- Sagkeeng First Nation
- Sandy Bay First Nation
- Sapotaweyak Cree Nation
- Sayisi Dene First Nation
- Shamattawa First Nation
- Sioux Valley Dakota Nation
- Skownan First Nation
- St. Theresa Point First Nation
- Swan Lake First Nation
- Tataskweyak Cree Nation
- Tootinaowaziibeeng First Nation
- War Lake First Nation
- Wasagamack First Nation
- Waywayseecappo First Nation
- York Factory First Nation

==== Urban reserves ====
There are currently 14 urban reserves in Manitoba:

- Opaskwayak Cree Nation — adjacent to The Pas
- Swan Lake First Nation's urban reserve land — within the Rural Municipality of Headingley
- Roseau River Anishinabe First Nation's urban reserve land — adjacent to Winnipeg
- Sapotaweyak Cree Nation's two parcels of urban reserve land — both within Swan River
- Nisichawaysihk Cree Nation's urban reserve land — within Thompson
- Birdtail Sioux First Nation's urban reserve land — within Foxwarren in Prairie View Municipality
- War Lake First Nation's 40 parcels of urban reserve land — in Ilford
- Long Plain First Nation's two urban reserve lands — one adjacent to Portage la Prairie and one within Winnipeg
- Gambler First Nation's urban reserve business park — in Brandon
- Peguis First Nation's urban reserve land — within Winnipeg
- Rolling River First Nation's urban reserve land — in the Rural Municipality of Headingley
- Waywayseecappo First Nation's urban reserve land — in the Rural Municipality of Elton

== See also ==
- Indian Reserves in Manitoba
