= Naawi-Oodena =

Reserve in Canada

Coordinates: 49°51′15″N 97°12′35″W

Naawi-Oodena (Anishinaabemowin; English: "centre of the heart and community") is an urban reserve within Winnipeg, Manitoba. Jointly controlled by the Brokenhead, Long Plain, Peguis, Roseau River, Sagkeeng, Sandy Bay and Swan Lake First Nations, the 64-hectare, 160-acre parcel is located near the River Heights and Tuxedo neighbourhoods of southwest Winnipeg, and is the largest urban reserve in Canada.

The land was formerly occupied by the Kapyong Barracks of Princess Patricia's Canadian Light Infantry. The federal government had pursued plans to redevelop the site via the Canada Lands Company, but were met with legal disputes from local First Nations who made claims to its land. Following a court battle, an agreement was reached in August 2019 to transfer the site to a group of Treaty 1 communities as an urban reserve. The land was officially repatriated as the Naawi-Oodena reserve on December 9, 2022, and is being jointly developed by Treaty One Development Corporation and the Canada Lands Company.

== History ==
The location was used by the Princess Patricia's Canadian Light Infantry until 2004, when its Kapyong Barracks was decommissioned, and the unit was relocated to CFB Shilo. In 2007 the Treasury Board of Canada sought to sell the land to crown corporation Canada Lands Company, but were met with objections from First Nations who claimed a right to the land.

A September 2009 decision by a Federal Court judge blocked the government's plans, citing a lack of consultation with First Nations. The government appealed the court's decision, but lost the appeal in 2012. In September 2015, while campaigning in Winnipeg for the federal election, Prime Minister Stephen Harper revealed that the federal government would not pursue a further appeal, stating that "we've met with local First Nations leaders and will continue to do so as we move forward."

Demolition of the Kapyong Barracks started in 2018. On August 30, 2019, a settlement agreement was signed by the federal government to transfer the land to a group of seven Treaty 1 First Nations, including the Brokenhead, Long Plain, Peguis, Roseau River, Sagkeeng, Sandy Bay and Swan Lake First Nations. Preliminary plans were unveiled for redevelopment of the site, which were projected to take 10 to 15 years, and contribute at least $2 billion in economic development.

On April 14, 2021, the new reserve was formally given the name "Naawi-Oodena", an Anishinaabe phrase meaning "centre of the heart and community". On July 20, 2022, the city of Winnipeg reached an agreement to provide municipal services to Naawi-Oodena. On December 16, 2022, the Kapyong Barracks land was officially repatriated to Naawi-Oodena. In December 2023, new Manitoba NDP premier Wab Kinew—himself a member of the Onigaming First Nation in Northwestern Ontario—stated that he was open to proposals for a tribal casino in Naawi-Oodena.

== Developments ==
45 hectares of the land will be developed by Treaty One—a development corporation incorporated by the Treaty 1 Nations. It plans to construct a mixed-use neighbourhood with residential, commercial, cultural, and recreational amenities. In June 2025, Oodena Gas & Convenience became the first business to open in Naawi-Oodena. A 260-unit apartment known as Endayaan Omaa ("home is here") is being constructed by Treaty One with federal funding from the Build Canada Homes agency, which will include 109 units of affordable housing.

The remainder of the land will be developed by the Canada Lands Company.
