= National Indigenous Residential School Museum of Canada =

Coordinates: 49°57′44″N 98°19′22″W

The National Indigenous Residential School Museum of Canada, inc. is a museum about the Canadian Indian residential school system located in Portage la Prairie, Manitoba. The museum is located in the Rufus Prince Building on the Long Plain Indian Reserve No. 6, formerly the site of the Portage la Prairie Indian Residential School. The museum was set up and is partially run by the Long Plain First Nation.

== Background ==
The Rufus Prince building was originally the second Portage la Prairie Indian Residential School, which operated at the site from 1915 to its closure in 1975. On August 14, 1981, the former residential school building and the surrounding land was transferred to the ownership of the Long Plain First Nation as part of an outstanding Treaty Land Entitlement stemming from a Loss of Use Claim. The building was renamed the Rufus Prince Building in honour of Rufus Prince, a survivor of the residential school.

Following renovations the building was used by Yellowquill College from 1984 until 2000 when the college moved to Winnipeg. Since then the building has been used as a resource centre by the Long Plains First Nation, holding offices for the Assembly of Manitoba Chiefs, the Dakota Ojibway Tribal Council, and Long Plain First Nation. Additionally it has operated as a historic site since 2003.

== Establishment of the museum ==
Following a Benefit-Cost Ratio study in December 2001 the Long Plain First Nation started a project to create a museum of residential school history in the Rufus Prince building in 2003, with this becoming the National Indigenous Residential School Museum of Canada. The creation of a museum about the Canadian Indian residential school system was also resolved by the Assembly of First Nations in 2001.

Development of the museum was continuing in 2015, with members of the First Nation hoping the Calls to Action from the final report of the Truth and Reconciliation Commission of Canada would result in more funding and support for the project. Following the National Historic Site designation of the Former Portage La Prairie Indian Residential School in 2020 the Long Plain First Nation wants to continue development of the site's museum along with adding a library and garden honouring survivors.

== Museum contents ==
The museum works to be a Place of Healing for survivors of the residential school system, and as a place to educate Canadians and others on the brutal treatment suffered by the hands of the Canadian government and the churches. The vision of the museum is a place where people can learn, share, heal and move forward with a greater understanding of the forces that shaped and forever changed multiple generations of First Nations peoples in Canada. The establishment of the museum also meets Reconciliation Call to Action number 10 from the Truth and Reconciliation Commission of Canada's report.

The museum contains artifacts, documents, and other materials from the Portage la Prairie Indian Residential School along with other residential schools from across Canada. Along with exhibits the museum also acts as an archive of materials. Along with exhibits about the conditions of residential schools the museum also includes a room dedicated to the Indigenous cultures the government and the residential school system attempted to erase.

Following delays caused by the COVID-19 pandemic an open house was held in December 2022, with tours of the museum beginning in 2023. The museum acquired two showcases in June 2024.

== Honours ==
In 2023 the museum was awarded the Manitoba Tourism Award for Best Indigenous Business or Operator - Manitoba at the 1st annual Manitoba Tourism Awards.
