= Southeast Resource Development Council =

Tribal council in eastern Manitoba

- Headquarters: Scanterbury, Manitoba; R0E 1W0
- Grand Chief: Sheldon Kent
- Affiliations: Assembly of Manitoba Chiefs; Southern Chiefs' Organization; Assembly of First Nations
- Website: serdc.mb.ca

The Southeast Resource Development Council (SERDC) is a tribal council in eastern Manitoba, Canada, representing 8 First Nation communities located to the south and east of Lake Winnipeg.

Seven of the eight band governments of SERDC are signatories to Treaty 5, with one (Brokenhead) being a signatory to Treaty 1.

== Members ==
The SERDC represents 8 First Nations communities:

- Berens River First Nation — Berens River
- Black River First Nation — O'Hanley
- Bloodvein First Nation — Bloodvein
- Brokenhead Ojibway Nation — Scanterbury
- Hollow Water First Nation — Wanipigow
- Little Grand Rapids First Nation — Little Grand Rapids
- Pauingassi First Nation — Pauingassi
- Poplar River First Nation — Negginan

== Demographics ==
As of February 2018, the total registered population of the 8 member communities was 14,897, including 9,356 members on-reserve and 5,537 residing off-reserve.

Ojibway/Saulteaux is the dominant language used in the SERDC communities, though Cree is also spoken.

== Geography ==
The 8 member communities are located in eastern Manitoba, to the south and east of Lake Winnipeg, with a majority within the Precambrian Shield region.

Together, the communities comprise a total land base of approximately 15,821.2 hectares (39,095 acres).

== Amenities ==
- Berens River Airport
- Bloodvein River Airport
- Little Grand Rapids Airport
- Southeast Collegiate (Winnipeg), owned by SERDC
