= Dakota Ojibway Tribal Council =

- Formation: August 1974; 51 years ago
- Headquarters: Portage la Prairie; R1N 3B7
- Grand Chief: Jason Daniels
- Website: dotc.mb.ca

The Dakota Ojibway Tribal Council (DOTC) is a First Nations tribal council in southern Manitoba, Canada, consisting of 6 Dakota and Ojibway band governments.

== History ==
The Dakota Ojibway Tribal Council was founded in 1972, and formally incorporated as a non-profit organization in August 1974.

The DOTC originally had 10 members when it was founded, including: Birdtail Sioux First Nation, Canupawakpa Dakota Nation, Dakota Plains Wahpeton Nation, Dakota Tipi FN, Long Plain FN, Roseau River Anishinabe FN, Sandy Bay Ojibway FN, Sioux Valley DN, Swan Lake FN, and Tootinaowaziibeeng FN.

The council's head office was originally established in Brandon, Manitoba, but is now located in Long Plain FN, adjacent to Portage la Prairie.

== Members ==
As of 2023, the DOTC has 6 members. The council originally had 10 members when it was founded, and has since gained and lost members.

=== Current members ===
- Birdtail Sioux First Nation — Beulah
- Dakota Tipi First Nation — Dakota Tipi
- Roseau River Anishinabe First Nation — Ginew
- Sandy Bay First Nation — Marius
- Swan Lake First Nation — Swan Lake

=== Former members ===
- Canupawakpa Dakota First Nation
- Dakota Plains Wahpeton Nation
- Sioux Valley Dakota Nation
- Waywayseecappo First Nation

== Services and amenities ==
- Manitoba First Nation Police Service
- Long Plain First Nation Annual Pow-wow
- Yellowquill College
