= Portage la Prairie Indian Residential School =

Former Indian residential school in Manitoba

Coordinates: 49°57′44″N 98°19′22″W

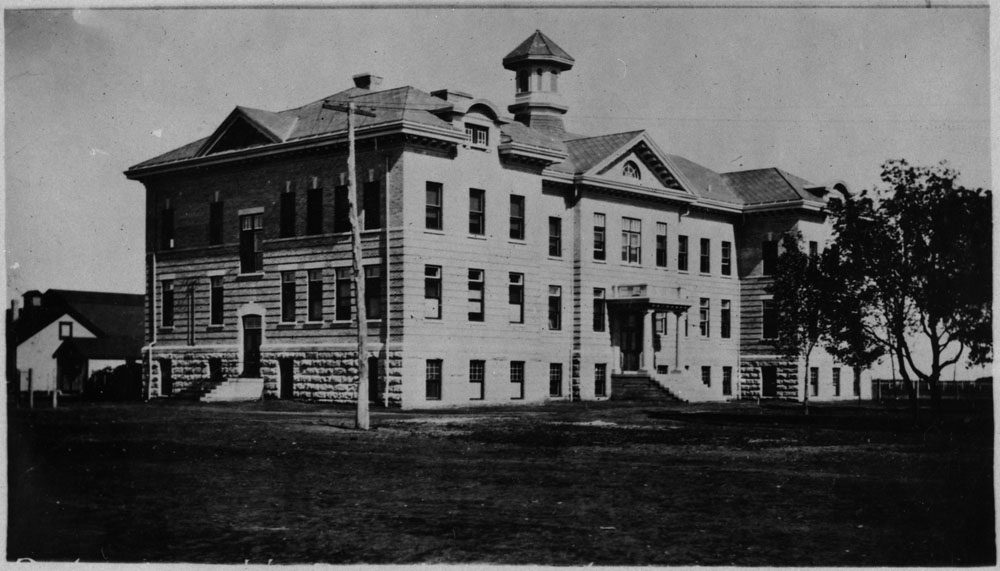
- Portage la Prairie Indian Residential School circa 1914–15
- 5000 Crescent Road West, Portage la Prairie, Manitoba, Canada

Information
- Religious affiliations: Presbyterian, United Church of Canada
- Established: 1888
- Closed: June 30, 1975
- Education system: Canadian Indian residential school system

Portage la Prairie Indian Residential School, later known as Portage Indian Student Residence, (Note: The authorized form of the name by the National Centre for Truth and Reconciliation is 'Portage la Prairie Residential School'. The NCTR also notes the following names: Portage la Prairie Sioux Boarding School (1896-1908); Portage la Prairie Boarding School (1896-1927); Portage la Prairie Indian Residential School (1927-1965); Portage Indian Student Residence (1965-1975); The official name for the historic site given by Parks Canada is the 'Former Portage La Prairie Indian Residential School National Historic Site'.) was a Canadian Indian residential school and later an Indian student residence/hostel located in Portage la Prairie, Manitoba. The school started in 1888 and was closed in 1975.

The school is an Indian Residential Schools Settlement Agreement (IRSSA) recognized school. It was declared a National Historic Site of Canada in September 2020.

Since August 14, 1981 the former residential school building and the surrounding land has been under the ownership of the Long Plain First Nation, becoming the Long Plain Indian Reserve No. 6 in 1982. The building was renamed the Rufus Prince Building in honour of Rufus Prince, a survivor of the residential school. It currently operates as a historical site in the Keeshkeemaquah village, with the building being used as a resource centre by the Long Plain First Nation and the first floor holding the National Indigenous Residential School Museum of Canada.

== History ==
The school began as a day school in 1888 started by a group of women from the Knox Presbyterian Church. The women then looked for funding outside of Portage la Prairie, eventually having an agreement with the Women's Foreign Missionary Society of the Presbyterian Church based in Ontario to finance and manage the school if it became a residential school. In 1890 the Canadian government agreed to fund the school, with the residential school opening in 1891. The day school closed in 1893. The school was located east of Portage la Prairie.

In the 1910s the original building became too small, and in 1913 the Department of Indian Affairs purchased three lots along Crescent Lake southwest of Portage la Prairie. Construction on a new building began in 1914 and was completed and the school moved in 1915. The site was expanded in 1919 with the purchase of additional farmland, with farming allowing the school to run in a budget surplus in the 1920s and 1930s. In 1925 the school was transferred to the control of the United Church of Canada.

Following the closure of Norway House Residential School in 1946 in northern Manitoba the Portage la Prairie school began enrolling Cree students. The school also enrolled students from Island Lake and other distant communities in Manitoba despite orders from the Department of Indian Affairs explicitly forbidding this.

Starting in 1957 the Department of Indian Affairs and the United Church of Canada began reorganizing Portage la Prairie Indian Residential School and Brandon Indian Residential School, the only two United Church run residential schools remaining in Manitoba. Elementary aged students were sent to Brandon while older students were at Portage la Prairie. Portage la Prairie began gradual integration of students into local secondary schools in 1957, with integration mainly completed by 1961 when the residential school closed its last classroom. From this point on the school remained a student residence. The school continued to employ 'teacher-advisors' which accompanied residential school students into public secondary schools to organize studies and keep records. Some former residential school students were boarded in private homes in Portage la Prairie starting in 1961. The official name was changed to Portage Indian Student Residence in 1965 following renovations.

In 1969 ownership was officially transferred from the United Church of Canada to the Department of Indian Affairs. The facility was closed on June 30, 1975, at the end of the school year. The remaining students were transferred to private homes.

=== Following closure ===
Following the closure of the Portage Indian Student Residence the building and surrounding land was transferred to the Long Plains First Nation on August 14, 1981, as part of an outstanding Treaty Land Entitlement stemming from a Loss of Use Claim. It was renamed the Rufus Prince Building following transfer to Long Plains First Nation. Following renovations the building was used by Yellowquill College from 1984 until 2000 when the college moved to Winnipeg.

Since then the building has been used as a resource centre by the Long Plains First Nation, holding offices for the Assembly of Manitoba Chiefs, the Dakota Ojibway Tribal Council, and Long Plain First Nation. Additionally it has operated as a historic site since 2003.

Following a Benefit-Cost Ratio study in December 2001 the Long Plain First Nation started a project to create a museum of residential school history in the building in 2003, with this becoming the National Indigenous Residential School Museum of Canada. Development of the museum was continuing in 2015, with members of the First Nation hoping the Calls to Action from the final report of the Truth and Reconciliation Commission of Canada would result in more funding and support for the project. Following its National Historic Site designation the Long Plain First Nation wants to continue development of the site's museum along with adding a library and garden honouring survivors.

== Conditions and deaths ==
During the 1940s the school had multiple runaways, with a notable case of four girls suffering frostbite starting an investigation by the Department of Indian Affairs into the conditions at the school. The investigation found that the principal, Joseph Jones, used strict measures for control and punishment of children. The school made an example of girls who went truant by cutting their hair, children were not allowed to speak during meals, siblings were only allowed to speak by request, all mail was censored, all doors were kept locked, staff would pull the children's hair and hit them on the head with their knuckles, and both staff and the principal applied the strap frequently. Jones was removed as principal.

Illness was common in the school, and multiple children are noted to have died from tuberculosis. The school also had issues with heating in the winter and with septic tank back ups. Of the 338 total students identified by the Truth and Reconciliation Commission to have died at or within one year of attending a residential school in Manitoba only 164, less than half, are identified by name. Of those named and identified five died while attending the Portage la Prairie Indian Residential School.

=== Gravesites ===
In 2020 the Long Plains First Nation began doing research into possible unmarked graves at the site of the Portage la Prairie School, covering about 4 acres of land on the Keeshkeemaquah reserve. In 2021 they spent around $50,000 on the effort which also resulted in the discovery of the more precise location of the original residential school building within Portage la Prairie. The reserve added this newfound knowledge to their application to Indigenous Services Canada for additional funding for the searches.

In 2022, one year after the discovery of 215 unmarked graves at the site of the former Kamloops Indian Residential School in British Columbia, Manitoba First Nations began the process of searching the sites of the 14 former residential schools in the province for similar unmarked graves. While the Long Plains First Nation would conduct ground searches prior to building or construction on the site, as of May 2022 no searches were underway. Adam Myran, lands director for Long Plain First Nation, commented that they wanted to wait and see how other searches went. They were specifically looking at the search of Mohawk Institute Residential School by the Six Nations of the Grand River in Ontario, where the Ontario Provincial Police were involved as they treated it as a crime scene investigation into the deaths.

Myran also shares that children from over 20 communities across the province were sent to the residential school and that the Long Plain First Nation wants the communities these children came from to be involved in the ground search process in an equitable manner.

In June 2025 ground-penetrating radar searches began at the residential school site, starting with the front and back sides of the property.

== Legacy ==
In 2005 the Portage la Prairie Indian Residential School was declared a Provincial Heritage Site by the Manitoba Heritage Council, with a plaque being installed. A golden eagle monument was erected on the grounds of the school and is dedicated to First Nations people who were forced to attend residential schools.

The residential school site was officially declared a National Historic Site of Canada by Parks Canada in September 2020. It was nominated for designation by the Long Plains First Nation. The First Nation worked collaboratively with Parks Canada to identify the historic values of the site, with the report prepared for the Historic Sites and Monuments Board being co-authored by members of Long Plains First Nation and Parks Canada. It was designated a National Historic Site along with Shubenacadie Indian Residential School in Nova Scotia and the designation of the Indian residential school system as an Event of National Historic Significance. As of 2025 the plaque has yet to be installed. (Note: This is based on the last update to the site's background on the National historic sites designations page in 2021, and the site's entry in the Directory of Federal Heritage Designations managed by Parks Canada.) While some survivors wanted to destroy the building once it became property of the First Nation others wanted it kept as a testimony to the abuse they survived. Many are now glad it was left standing following its historic designation and it has been transformed a place to serve the community.

In June 2022 a ceremony was held at the former Portage la Prairie Indian Residential School to identify, commemorate and protect burial sites of Manitoba children who were part of the residential school system. The ceremony was attended by provincial officials, Indigenous leaders, elders, and survivors. The ceremony includes stories shared by survivors of the Portage la Prairie school along with other residential schools in the province.
