= Jacob Berens =

Ojibwa chief

Jacob Berens (c. 1835 – 7 July 1916) was an Ojibwa chief whose native name was Nah-wee-kee-sick-quah-yash (and variations). The name means light moving in the centre of the sky and probably was a result of the Halley's Comet occurrence in 1835.

Berens was instrumental in negotiations of Treaty No.5 with the Canadian government in 1875.

The community of Berens River, and the Berens River, itself gave rise to his English surname. The Berens River First Nation are the aboriginal population that also utilize the name.
