= Cathy Merrick =

Canadian Cree politician (1961–2024)

- Kameekosit Ispokanee Iskwew
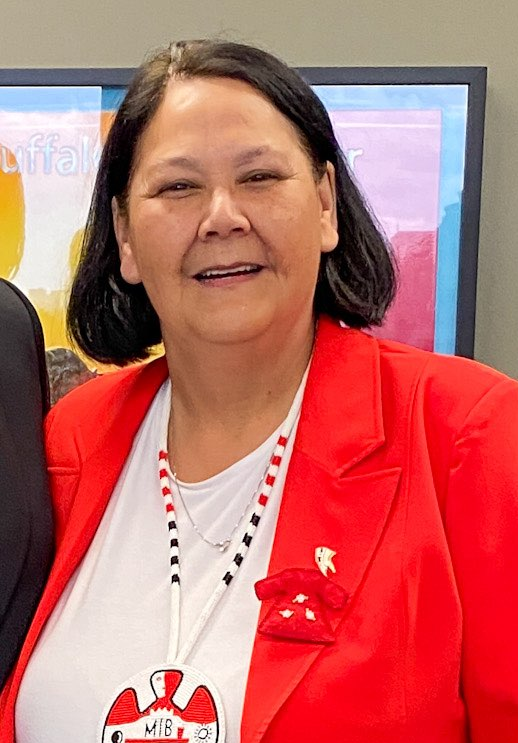
- Merrick in 2023

Grand Chief of the Assembly of Manitoba Chiefs
- In office October 26, 2022 – September 6, 2024
- Preceded by: Arlen Dumas
- Succeeded by: Kyra Wilson

Chief of Pimicikamak Cree Nation
- In office 2013–2018
- Preceded by: Walter Monias
- Succeeded by: David Monias

Personal details
- Born: Catherine Ann McKay; May 31, 1961 Norway House, Manitoba, Canada
- Died: September 6, 2024 (aged 63) Winnipeg, Manitoba, Canada
- Spouse: Todd Merrick
- Children: 3

Catherine Ann Merrick (née McKay; Woods Cree: Kameekosit Ispokanee Iskwew; May 31, 1961 – September 6, 2024) was a Cree woman from Pimicikamak Cree Nation and the Grand Chief of the Assembly of Manitoba Chiefs. Merrick began her political career in 2001 as a Councillor for her home nation of Pimicikamak Cree Nation; she served in that position for 12 years. She then became the second female Chief of Pimicikamak and served in this role until 2018. As Chief, Merrick supported the development of a $55-million healthcare centre within the community. In October 2022, Merrick became the first woman to be elected Grand Chief to the Assembly of Manitoba Chiefs, succeeding Arlen Dumas. She was re-elected to this position in July 2024.

As Grand Chief, she worked to address the reputation of the AMC following Dumas' tenure, negotiating water and land claims for Manitoba First Nations, working towards the return of the Sioux Valley Dakota Nation to the AMC, and advocating for a landfill search for the victims of the 2022 Winnipeg serial killings.

On September 6, 2024, Merrick was addressing a press conference outside the Manitoba Law Courts in Winnipeg, following the acquittal of the corrections officer involved in the death of William Ahmo. While speaking to the media on a separate issue regarding the Children's Special Allowance, announced the previous day, she suddenly collapsed. Merrick was pronounced dead shortly after being transported to St. Boniface Hospital. Her death elicited responses from Indigenous and political leaders across Manitoba, Canada, and internationally.

== Early life and education ==
Catherine Ann McKay was born on May 31, 1961. Her parents were from Cross Lake First Nation, but she was raised outside of Winnipeg. When she was around two years old, she was taken from her parents as part of the Sixties Scoop, as a social worker had deemed her parents unable to care for her due to having several children already. Merrick was given to a white Canadian family, the Spences, who raised her in Steinbach, Manitoba. When she was around nine years old, her adoptive parents took her to Cross Lake to formalize the adoption process but relinquished her after seeing her parents' insistence that she stay with them. She attended residential school, and furthered her studies at Brandon University.

== Career ==
Following her graduation from university, Merrick worked in various capacities for her First Nation. She initially worked as the Associate Health Director for the Cross Lake Band, and then as the executive director. As executive director, she oversaw the First Nation's administration, business, and finances.

Merrick began her career as a councillor for the Pimicikamak Cree Nation, first elected in 2001. She campaigned on social issues within her community, campaigning on finding solutions for the First Nation to support young families and the elderly. She served 12 years as a councillor for the First Nation until she ran for the position of chief in 2013, becoming the second woman to serve in the position in the First Nation's history. She had previously run for the position twice and considered resigning from politics altogether if she were to lose on her third attempt.

As chief, she declared a state of emergency following several suicides of youth within the community, developed programs for community members to enhance their cultural connections and employment skills, and negotiated with the federal government to advocate for the construction of a $55-million healthcare centre. During the Manitoba Hydro Northern Flood Agreement, she was an advocate for Indigenous rights. She left the position of chief in 2018.

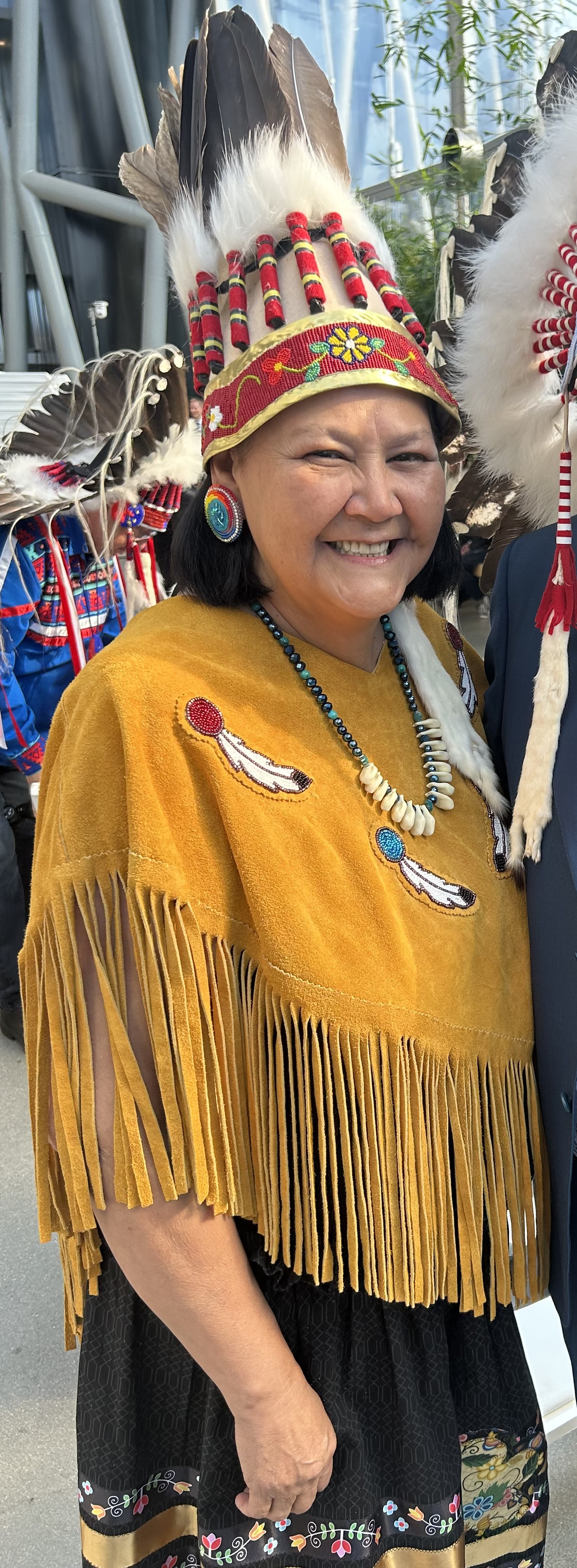
Merrick in 2023, attending the inauguration of Premier of Manitoba Wab Kinew

Merrick was elected as grand chief of the Assembly of Manitoba Chiefs (AMC) on October 26, 2022, following a by-election after serving as chief of the Pimicikamak Cree Nation. She was nominated by her successor in Pimicikamak, Chief David Monias. Merrick won on the second ballot, gathering 37 out of 59 votes ahead of George Kemp, former chief of Berens River First Nation who received 22 votes. In the first round, Merrick and Kemp received 17 and 13 votes respectively, with candidates requiring 11 votes to advance to the second round of voting. Among the candidates vying for the position were Sheila North, Eugene Eastman, Jennifer Flett, Cora Morgan and Darrell N. Shorting.

Upon her election, she became the first woman to lead the Assembly of Manitoba Chiefs. She succeeded Arlen Dumas, who had vacated the position following allegations of workplace sexual harassment. Merrick campaigned on addressing affordability for elders, giving First Nations control of child and family services, tackling addiction and homelessness, addressing violence among First Nations communities, and seeking justice for Missing and Murdered Indigenous people. Following her election, she sought out meetings with the leaders of the Southern Chiefs Organization and the Manitoba Keewatinowi Okimakanak to create a unified voice for First Nations in Manitoba, as well as advocating for northern First Nations who she believed were left behind.

During her tenure, Merrick worked to rebuild the reputation of the AMC following the fallout of Dumas' tenure, as well as beginning negotiations on water rights and treaty land entitlement claims for Manitoba First Nations. Merrick was a prominent voice in calling for a landfill search for the victims of the 2022 Winnipeg serial killings remains, with Niigaan Sinclair writing for the Winnipeg Free Press describing Merrick as the "primary political voice demanding a search of the Prairie Green landfill". During her tenure, she negotiated for the return of the Sioux Valley Dakota Nation to the AMC, who had previously left the AMC a decade prior.

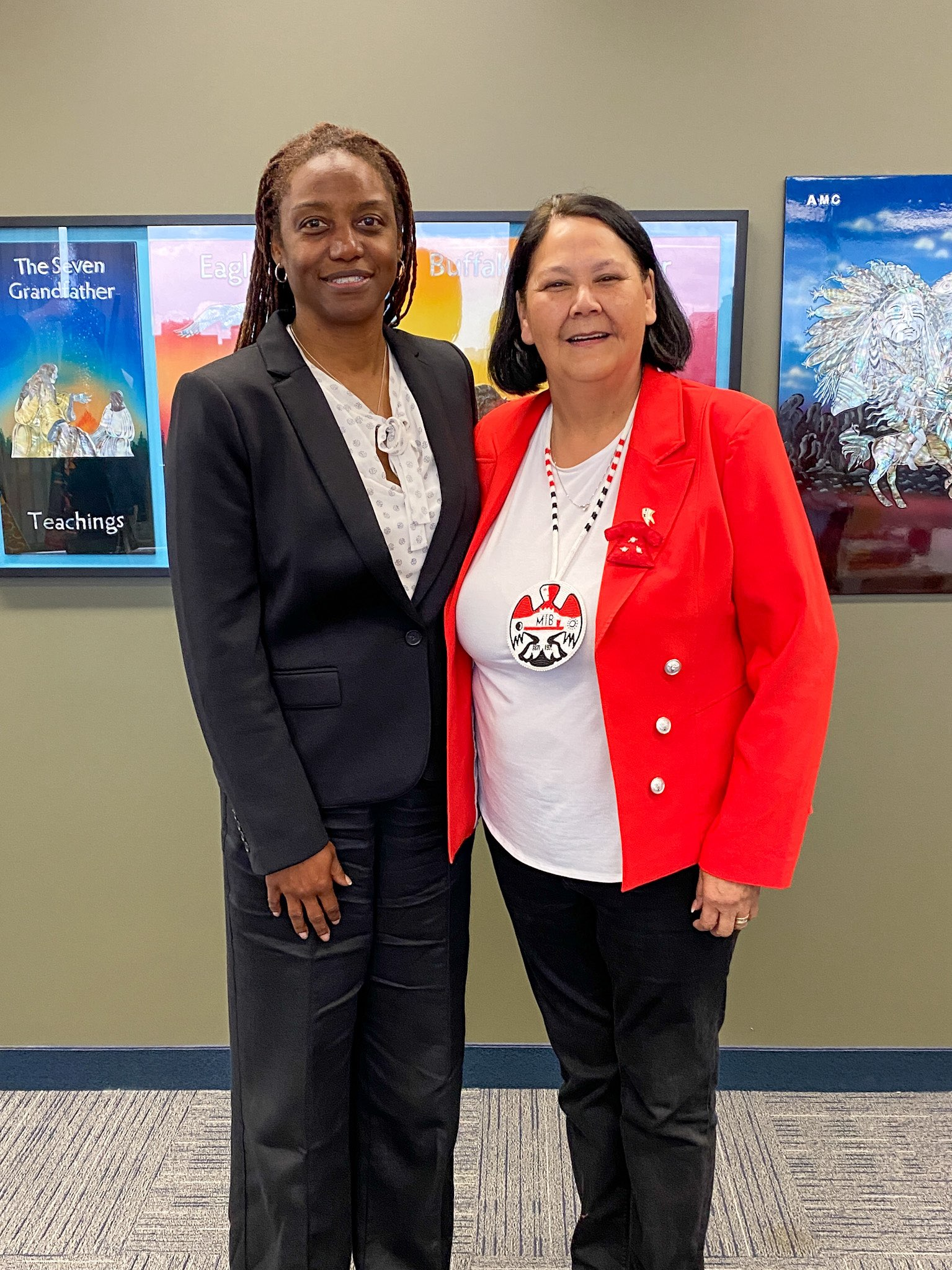
Merrick alongside US Consul Marilyn Gayton in 2023

Merrick was re-elected in July 2024, against two other challengers: George Kemp and Darrell N. Shorting, a member of the Little Saskatchewan First Nation. She won with 65 percent of the vote. Prior to her death, she was scheduled to speak regarding the long-term boil water advisory at the Shamattawa First Nation.

== Personal life ==
Merrick and her husband, Todd, were married for thirty years, and had three children. She maintained contact with her biological and adoptive families. She was described by APTN News as "an accomplished sun dancer and pipe carrier".

=== Death and legacy ===
Merrick collapsed suddenly on September 6, 2024, while talking with reporters outside of the Winnipeg law courts regarding the acquittal of corrections officer Robert Jeffrey Morden following the death of William Ahmo. CPR was administered at the scene, but Merrick was later pronounced dead at St. Boniface Hospital, aged 63. No cause of death has yet been reported; as of September 18, autopsy results were pending.

In response to her death, Premier of Manitoba Wab Kinew stated: "She approached her work with joy, compassion, thoughtfulness and a spirituality that was grounded in the belief that we are all equal in the eyes of the Creator and that we all deserve to live a good life". Prime Minister of Canada Justin Trudeau stated she was "a relentless and incredibly effective advocate for First Nations peoples, especially for those most vulnerable. As the first woman to lead the Assembly of Manitoba Chiefs, and throughout her entire career, she inspired so many of us". Mayor of Winnipeg Scott Gillingham described Merrick's death as a "huge loss" and that "I will only hold her in the highest regard." Manitoba Métis Federation president David Chartrand described her as "a consummate professional, a strong communicator and a passionate advocate for her people – she died as she lived, working tirelessly for the causes she cared about." Minister of Crown–Indigenous Relations Gary Anandasangaree described Merrick as a "fierce advocate." MP Dan Vandal described her as "a tireless advocate for First Nations in Manitoba and an excellent grand chief. Her spirit and legacy is an example to us all" and MP Niki Ashton, who represents the Pimicikamak Cree Nation in the Parliament of Canada, described Merrick as an "inspiration" who led with "compassion, determination and courage." Niigaan Sinclair writing in the Winnipeg Free Press described Merrick's life journey as "Fighting for those who need fighting for – those who needed food, medicine, love and attention."

Photographs taken shortly after Merrick's collapse were publicized by the Winnipeg Free Press, leading to the AMC boycotting the outlet in response to the publication. The Winnipeg Free Press later apologized for the publication of the image following backlash by Manitoba Indigenous organizations.

In response to her death, the flags outside the Manitoba Legislative Building were lowered to half mast. Merrick's body was laid in state in the Manitoba Legislative Building on September 11, 2024, only the sixth person and first woman to have received the honour, preceded by Elijah Harper. She was interred in the Cross Lake Cemetery in the Pimicikamak Cree Nation.
