= Arlen Dumas =

Canadian Indigenous leader (born 1974)

Grand Chief of the Assembly of Manitoba Chiefs
- Succeeded by: Cathy Merrick
- In office 2017–2021
- In office 2021–2022

Personal details
- Born: 17 September 1974 (age 52) Pukatawagan, Manitoba, Canada
- Education: Mount Allison University

Arlen Dumas (born 17 September 1974) is a Canadian Cree leader.

== Life ==
Dumas was born and raised in Pukatawagan, Manitoba. He began attending Lakefield College School in Ontario at age 16, and attended Mount Allison University until 1999, studying Political Science and Canadian Studies. He lived in Toronto for a year as a stay at home father, and then worked in Toronto for several years as a community centre director.

In 2008, Dumas, aged 33, was elected chief of the Mathias Colomb First Nation.

Dumas has participated in the Idle No More movement, and in activism against the Hudbay Minerals company beginning in 2013.

In 2017, Dumas was elected grand chief of the Assembly of Manitoba Chiefs, succeeding Derek Nepinak. In 2019 he left the role for two weeks following an accusation of catfishing, with the role being temporarily filled by Chief Sheldon Kent of Black River First Nation. He was re-elected to the role in 2021. In March 2022, Dumas was suspended from the position following allegations of sexual harassment from a former female staff member; he was formally removed in August 2022 following an independent investigation into the matter. In August 2023, Dumas was sued by the former staff member, who alleged he had raped and sexually harassed her. Dumas launched a countersuit against the woman in November 2023.

After being removed from the grand chief position, Dumas took the role of Health Services director at Quest Health Clinic Inc.

== Personal life ==
Dumas' son, Achahk Dumas who had cystic fibrosis, died in 2019.
