= Yellowquill College =

First Nations-controlled post-secondary institution

Coordinates: 49°53′23″N 97°12′14″W

Yellowquill University College
- Official logo as of 2021
- Motto: Specializing in First Nation & Aboriginal Education and Training
- Type: First Nations owned community college
- Established: 1984
- Accreditation: National Indigenous Accreditation Board, World Indigenous Nations Higher Education Consortium
- Affiliations: Dakota Ojibway Tribal Council, CICan, CCAA, AUCC, MFNERC
- Director: Bobbi Pompana
- Students: 200 (2012)
- Location: Winnipeg, Manitoba, Canada
- Campus: Urban
Colours
Yellow and Blue
- Website: www.yellowquill.org

Yellowquill University College is Manitoba's first First Nations-controlled post-secondary institution. The First Nation-owned and -operated college was founded in October 1984, by the Dakota Ojibway Tribal Council.

== Governance ==
Yellowquill University College currently operates under the auspices of the Dakota Ojibway Tribal Council. The eight chiefs of the member bands serve as the board of directors for Yellowquill University College. The college is incorporated both federally and provincially and is a non-profit organization. Yellowquill University College is funded by the Manitoba and federal governments, and First Nation communities in Manitoba and across Canada.

== History ==
Yellowquill College was originally located in the former Portage la Prairie Presbyterian Indian Residential school building on Crescent Road West in Portage la Prairie. Yellowquill College was founded as a manifestation of the 1972 document "Indian Control of Indian Education" by the National Indian Brotherhood/Assembly of First Nations. The college opened with sixteen students. and has had over a thousand graduates. As of 2012, the college has approximately 200 students.

In 2000, the college moved in 2000 to Portage Avenue in Winnipeg. In 2003, the college moved to its current location at 340 Assiniboine Avenue in 2003. In 2012, the college moved into the former Manitoba Hydro building. Offsite locations for the Mature Student high School Diploma program include community partnerships with the Bloodvein First Nation, Long Plain First Nation, and Sioux Valley Dakota Nation.

== Programs ==
Yellowquill College offers programs in:

- College and University Entrance Preparation Programs
- Business Certificate Certified Aboriginal Financial Manager (CAFM) designation (Yellowquill College), which works towards a Certified General Accountant (CGA) designation, and a Bachelor of Accounting Science Degree (University of Calgary).
- Diabetes Prevention Worker
- First Nations Child and Family Services Worker Diploma Program is offered through a partnership between Yellowquill College & Dakota Ojibway Child and Family Services
- First Nation Community Management
- First Nation Governance
- Mature Student High School Diploma
- First Nation Human Resource Management
- First Nation Addictions and Mental Health Worker
- First Nation Bachelor of Teaching
- Clerical, Small Business Management, Secretarial, Office Technology, Child Care, Native Economic Development, Business Administration and Administrative Assistant programs has prepared students directly for the workforce.
- Professional development and work related training

== See also ==
- List of universities in Manitoba
- Higher education in Manitoba
- Education in Canada
