= Pauingassi First Nation =

First Nation in Manitoba, Canada

- Band No. 327
- People: Saulteaux
- Treaty: Treaty 5
- Province: Manitoba

Land
- Main reserve: Pauingassi First Nation Indian Reserve
- Land area: 2.605 km^{2} (1.006 sq mi)

Population (2019)
- On reserve: 624
- Off reserve: 66
- Total population: 690

Government
- Chief: Roddy Owens

Tribal Council
- Southeast Resource Development Council

Pauingassi First Nation (Ojibwe: Bawingaasi) is an Anishinaabe (Saulteaux/Ojibwa) First Nation community located approximately 280 kilometres (170 mi) northeast of Winnipeg, Manitoba, and 24 kilometres (15 mi) north of Little Grand Rapids, Manitoba, on a peninsula jutting southward into Fishing Lake, a tributary of Berens River.

The main economic base of the community remains hunting, fishing, trapping and wild rice harvesting.

The First Nation has one reserve land: Pauingassi First Nation Indian Reserve, spanning a total 260.50 hectares (643.7 acres), which serves as their main reserve and contains the eponymous settlement of Pauingassi at 52°09′20″N 95°22′26″W.

== Governance ==
Originally part of Little Grand Rapids First Nation, the Pauingassi received reserve status in 1988 and became a separate First Nation from the Little Grand Rapids First Nation on 7 October 1991.

Today, Pauingassi First Nation is governed by the Custom Electoral System of government. Pauingassi First Nation is a member of the Southeast Resource Development Council and a signatory to Treaty 5.
