= Standing Buffalo Dakota Nation =

First Nations band in Saskatchewan

- Band No. 386
- People: Dakota
- Headquarters: Fort Qu'Appelle
- Province: Saskatchewan

Land
- Other reserve: Standing Buffalo 78
- Land area: 22.461 km^{2} (8.672 sq mi)

Population (2021)
- On reserve: 488
- Off reserve: 820
- Total population: 1308

Government
- Chief: Rodger Redman

Tribal Council
- File Hills Qu'Appelle Tribal Council

Website
- standingbuffalodakotanation.com

The Standing Buffalo Dakota Nation (Dakota: Tataƞka Najiƞ Dakóta Oyáte) is a Dakota First Nations band government in southern Saskatchewan, Canada. The band controls a reserve at Standing Buffalo 78.

== History ==
The band is named after Chief Standing Buffalo (Tatankanaje / Tataƞka Najiƞ), who succeeded his father as hereditary chief in 1871. His people received permission to farm north of the Qu'Appelle Lakes, and their reserve was established in 1881. Although they were only allotted 80 acres per family, which was significantly less than the typical 640, the band prospered. By 1901, all households achieved self-sufficiency. However, in 1907, the community's agricultural success was eradicated when the government revoked access to hay lands. The band's requests for increased acreage went unaddressed until 1956.
