= Wahpeton Dakota Nation =

Native American tribal organization in Saskatchewan

Wahpeton Dakota Nation (Dakota: Waȟpéthuŋwaŋ Dakȟóta Oyáte) is a Dakota First Nation in Saskatchewan, Canada. Their reserves include:

- Wahpaton 94A
- Wahpaton 94B
