= Evergreen Theatre =

Evergreen Theatre was a touring educational, environmental, and science-based theatre company for young audiences from kindergarten to Grade six in Calgary, Alberta, Canada. It was a non-profit charitable organization and was operated by the Evergreen Theatre Society.

Evergreen produced musical theatre touring shows and artist-in-residency programs for schools, as well as workshops, presentations, and activities for conferences and organizations nationwide. Evergreen's environmental science-themed shows were performed at elementary schools, with opportunities for students to be in the shows.

The company also provided accessible and affordable community spaces for art, theatre, and dance. Over eighty arts and community organizations used the spaces for rehearsals, workshops, and performances.

== History ==
In 1991, Evergreen Theatre was founded by Scott Mair, Tara Ryan, Elinor Holt, Gerald Matthews, Don Enright, and Monique Keiran.

Sean Fraser joined Evergreen Theatre as the president in 2004. He had been the company's executive director since 2007.

In 2013, Valmai Goggin became Evergreen's Artistic Producer.

== Production history ==
Prior To 2006
Scripts written by Tara Ryan
Cliff & Edna Turn Green: endangered species, habitat & interrelationships
PondScum Inc.: wetlands, food chain, photosynthesis
We’re all Wet: phases of matter, watersheds, pollution & water treatment
Everything under the Sun: extraction of resources, electricity, circuits & safety
JUNK!: waste and the world, recycling, composting, man-made vs. natural waste
From the Ground Up: ecology, predator/prey relationships, decomposition
Full of Hot Air: weather/meteorology, clouds, greenhouse gasses & climate change
Rockin’ and Eroding: rocks/minerals, paleontology, sedimentation & geologic time
A Breath of Fresh Air: air, lungs, cardiovascular health, air quality & pollution
Captain Comet: space, asteroids, meteors & the components of a comet

2007 - 2008 Season
Food for Thought book and music by Ethan Cole
Go With The Flow book and music by Ethan Cole

2008 - 2009 Season
Food for Thought book and music by Ethan Cole
Go With The Flow book and music by Ethan Cole
The Three RRRs by Jacqueline Russell, music by David Morton

2009 - 2010 Season
Flushed by Meg Braem, music by David Morton
The Three RRRs by Jacqueline Russell, music by David Morton
Going to Extremes by Jacqueline Russell, music by David Morton

2010 - 2011 Season
Flushed by Meg Braem, music by David Morton
Lost, the Mystery of the Missing Species by Ellen Chorley, music by David Morton
Going to Extremes by Jacqueline Russell, music by David Morton

2011 - 2012 Season
Lost, the Mystery of the Missing Species by Ellen Chorley, music by David Morton
Princess Prudence and the Fairest in the Land by Jacqueline Russell, music by Allison Lynch
Fever Pitch by Ellen Chorley, music by David Morton

== Facility ==
From 2007 to 2015, Evergreen Theatre operated the Evergreen Community Studios in Calgary's Currie Barracks. In 2015, it moved to the Evergreen Community SPACES in Mayland Heights. Evergreen both owns and operates this facility. The 24,000-square-foot space contains various studios, a presentation theatre, as well as office spaces. Evergreen stated that 80 to 100 clients were using the facility and servicing more than 100,000 people each year.

== Community Affiliates ==
Evergreen is a member of The Society of Educational Resource Groups, Alberta's Promise, Calgary Professional Arts Alliance, REAP Sustainable Business Association, and Theatre Alberta.

== Funding ==
Funding for Evergreen is raised primarily through program revenues and corporate partnership, however this organization also receives funding through the Province of Alberta through the Alberta Lottery Fund and Alberta Foundation for the Arts (AFA).

The Evergreen Theatre Society's performance branch had received provincial and civic government funding for years. When the society purchased its Community Spaces, they were receiving an annual average of $66,000 from the Alberta Foundation for the Arts, totaling around $650,000 as of 2025. The Calgary Arts Development Authority had provided the Community Spaces annual funding since 2019. In the 2023-2024 funding year, the Calgary Arts Development Authority granted Evergreen $45,000. Grants from both organizations were specifically allocated for operational use as well as programming.

== Outreach ==
In addition to educational theatre, during the past 34 years, Evergreen also provided purpose-built space for dancers, musicians, as well as other grassroots organizations, especially in its Mayland Heights location. In 2024, it reported to the Calgary Arts Development Authority close to 5,000 activities in the studio spaces. 800 of the activities were designated explicitly for youth.

== Closure ==
On May 1, 2025, the Evergreen Theatre Society announced that it would be shut down on June 30, 2025. It had been in business for 34 years, serving the Calgary arts community. The organization was unable to renew a ten-year, $5.5-million loan with Social Enterprise Fund. Social Enterprise Fund (SEF) is an Alberta-based loan lender that invests in social enterprises and entrepreneurs.

Ryan Young, SEF's director, stated that in the last ten years, SEF had made "numerous efforts" to help Evergreen financially with nine extensions and amendments to the original loan agreement. "Despite these efforts, Evergreen was still unable to meet its loan commitments which led us to make the difficult decision to not renew the loan, which matured on March 15, 2025," Young said in an emailed statement.

== Awards ==
- 1998 - Alberta Emerald Award for Communication, Media & Arts
- 1998 - Calgary Mayor's Environmental Excellence Award
- 1999 - Interpretation Canada Gold Award
- 1999 - Calgary Mayor's Environmental Excellence Award
- 2002 - NSERC Michael Smith Award of Outstanding Educational Merit
- 2002 - Global, Environment & Outdoor Education Award of Merit
- 2003 - Recycling Council of Alberta's 3R's of Excellence Award
- 2004 - Global Woman of Vision Award for Tara Ryan, Artistic Director
- 2004 - Global, Environment & Outdoor Education Award of Merit
- 2008 - Alberta's Promise Red Wagon Award
- 2018 - Alberta Business Award of Distinction/Arts and Culture
- 2022 - Better Business Bureau Torch Award for Ethics
- 2023 - Alberta Emerald Award for Environmental Education
