= Canupawakpa Dakota First Nation =

Indian reserve in Manitoba, Canada

Coordinates: 49.6215°N 100.9352°W

The Canupawakpa Dakota First Nation or Chanupa Wakpa ('Pipestone River', a pipe was found along the river) is a First Nations in western Manitoba, located on Oak Lake Reserve - 59A (a smaller, non-developed 59B land parcel is located North of 59A near Scarth, Manitoba).

This First Nation's language is Dakota (a Siouan dialect) and they are affiliated with the Great Buffalo Nation Dakota.

The community has a high level of cultural and language retention and has very strong ties to other nearby Dakota First Nations, such as the Birdtail Sioux First Nation, Dakota Plains First Nation, and Sioux Valley First Nation. The main reserve is surrounded by the Rural Municipality of Pipestone, in whose southeastern portion it lies.

The reserve is located in the unceded territory of the Dakota people in Treaty 2. Canupawakpa, like all Dakota reserves in Canada, are not signatories to Treaties with Canada.

== See also ==
- Pipestone Creek (Saskatchewan)
