= Dakota Tipi First Nation =

Dakota First Nation in Manitoba

Dakota Tipi First Nation is a Dakota First Nation near Portage la Prairie, Manitoba, Canada. It is affiliated with the Dakota Ojibway Tribal Council and is identified by Indigenous Services Canada as Band No. 295.

== History ==
The community has its origins in Sioux Village near Portage la Prairie, where Dakota residents acquired Lot 99 through trustees in 1893. Following federal interventions and relocations, some families moved to Lot 25, which became Dakota Tipi. Dakota Tipi became a separate First Nation and received reserve status in 1972.

== Reserve and population ==
Indigenous Services Canada lists Dakota Tipi 1 as the Nation's reserve, with an area of 59.30 hectares. The 2021 Canadian census counted 226 residents in the Dakota Tipi 1 census subdivision.

== Governance and education ==
Dakota Tipi adopted the First Nations Elections Act electoral system in 2018.

The Nation participates in the Manitoba First Nations School System. The system's 2023–2024 annual report describes Dakota Tipi School as serving nursery through Grade 12 and records Dakota-language activities and an adult education program introduced in 2023.
