= Urban Indian reserve =

Canadian land designated as a First Nations reserve within an urban area

An urban Indian reserve (French: réserve indienne urbaine) or urban First Nations reserve (French: réserve urbaine des premières nations) is land that the Government of Canada has designated as a First Nations reserve that is situated within an urban area. Such lands allow for aboriginal commercial ventures which enjoy the tax exemptions offered to traditional reserves. They may be located within either a municipality or, in the case of Saskatchewan, a Northern Administration District.

An urban reserve may result from either encroachment of a municipal area into existing reserve lands, or from the designation of land in an existing urban territory.

Some commercial urban reserves exist as satellites to rural reserves. It has been suggested that the generated revenue will help maintain the economic well-being of the associated rural community.

== History ==
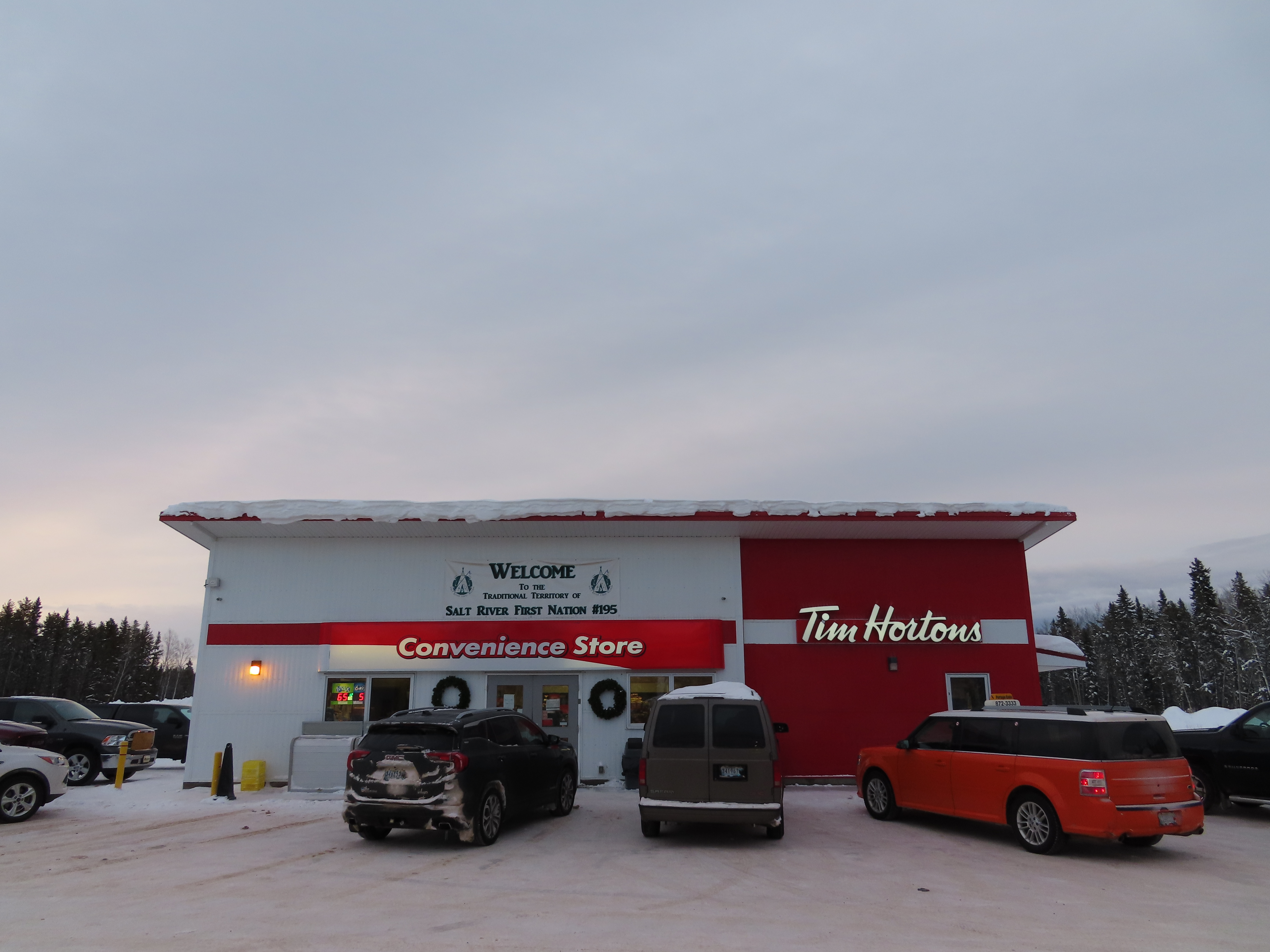
Many urban reserves host successful businesses. This Petro-Canada and Tim Hortons is on an urban reserve in Fort Smith, Northwest Territories.

Many reserves that were first established by the Indian Act in 1876, far from urban centers, have now been surrounded by urban agglomerations and fit within the category of urban reserves, such as Wendake, Quebec City. Near the end of the 20th century, reserves started to be created explicitly to act as urban reserves.

The first such reserve was established in 1981 at Kylemore, Saskatchewan as operated by the Fishing Lake First Nation (Treaty 4). Another urban reserve under the Peter Ballantyne Cree Nation (Treaty 6) followed at Prince Albert in 1982.

It is argued that the first formal commercial urban reserve was a property of 33 acres (13 ha) established within Saskatoon in 1988 for the Muskeg Lake Cree Nation. By 2004, the reserve's commercial activity grew to provide employment for 350 people under 37 businesses, today known as the McKnight Commercial Centre.

The Treaty Land Entitlement Framework Agreement (TLEFA) was signed on 9 September 1992 to settle unresolved treaty land claims for 28 First Nation groups in Saskatchewan. Article 9 of this accord provides a mechanism for First Nations groups to contract with municipal governments to allow designation of certain properties as reserves.

At least four urban reserves are also established in Manitoba. One of these, situated north of Winnipeg under the auspices of the Roseau River Anishinabe First Nation (Treaty 1), includes a gas station and a tobacco retailer with plans to include a medical facility and larger operations such as automobile retail.

In 2021 the City of Edmonton's City Council adopted a motion directing administration to develop an urban reserve strategy. The Urban Reserve Strategy was approved by council on June 28, 2021. It focuses on the possibility of First Nations band governments pursuing an Addition-to-Reserve/Reserve Creation (ARC/CC) development within the City of Edmonton boundaries, but acknowledges that urban reserves could also be created in other municipalities that border the city. It summarizes the process as the First Nation applying to create a new reserve with the federal government, negotiating a Municipal Services Agreement (MSA) with the municipality, and then developing the land into housing, businesses, parks, or whatever the band desires.

== Opinions ==
Critics such as the Canadian Taxpayers Federation are concerned that such reserves are entitled to exemptions from taxation that other businesses in a community do not enjoy. Furthermore, there are complications in disposing of urban reserve lands which require approval of the operating First Nation, and that reserve lands would revert to federal government control. Other critics such as the Frontier Centre for Public Policy concede that urban reserves have benefits, but wish the abolition of the reserve system and other racially based policies as a whole.

Proponents of urban reserves note that these encourage a diverse land base which provides business opportunities for First Nations people. It is also claimed that there are advantages to the surrounding community due to spin-off business activity which contributes favourably to those outside the reserve.

== Examples ==
Examples include:

- Capilano Indian Reserve No.5, inside Vancouver
- Musqueam First Nation, inside the Metro Vancouver Regional District
- Enoch Cree Nation 135, which borders Edmonton
- Kitsilano Indian Reserve No.6, inside Vancouver
- Mission Indian Reserve No.6, which borders North Vancouver
- Tsuu T'ina Nation 145, Alberta, which borders Calgary
- Membertou First Nation, inside Sydney, Nova Scotia (Cape Breton Regional Municipality)
- Cole Harbour 30, inside Cole Harbour, Nova Scotia (Halifax Regional Municipality)
- St. Mary's First Nation, inside Fredericton
- Keeshkeemaquah Reserve, which borders Portage la Prairie
- Madison Reserve #1, inside Winnipeg
- Naawi-Oodena, inside Winnipeg.
- Wendake, an enclave surrounded by Quebec City
- Kahnawake, Quebec, which borders Montreal, Quebec

== See also ==
- Urban Māori
- Urban Indian
