= Dakota people =

Indigenous people of North America

Dakota
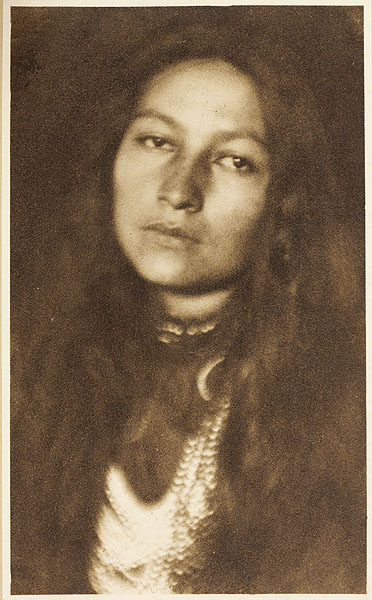
- Zitkala-Ša (1876–1938), Yankton author, photographed by Joseph Keiley

Total population
- 20,460 (2010)

Regions with significant populations
- United States (South Dakota, Minnesota, Nebraska, Montana, North Dakota), Canada (Manitoba, Saskatchewan)

Languages
- Dakota, English

Religion
- Christianity (incl. syncretistic forms), Native American religions, Native American Church, Wocekiye

Related ethnic groups
- Lakota, Assiniboine, Stoney (Nakota), and other Sioux

Dakota "ally / friend"
- People: Dakȟóta Oyáte
- Language: Dakȟótiyapi; Wíyutȟapi
- Country: Dakȟóta Makóce, Očhéthi Šakówiŋ

The Dakota (Dakota: Dakȟóta or Dakhóta, pronounced [daˈkˣota]) are a Native American tribe and First Nations band government in North America. They compose two of the three main subcultures of the Sioux people, and are typically divided into the Eastern Dakota and the Western Dakota.

The four bands of Eastern Dakota are the Bdewákaŋthuŋwaŋ, Waȟpéthuŋwaŋ, Waȟpékhute, and Sisíthuŋwaŋ and are sometimes referred to as the Santee (Isáŋyathi or Isáŋ-athi; 'knife' + 'encampment', 'dwells at the place of knife flint'), who reside in the eastern Dakotas, central Minnesota and northern Iowa. They have federally recognized tribes established in several places.

The Western Dakota are the Yankton, and the Yanktonai (Iháŋktȟuŋwaŋ and Iháŋktȟuŋwaŋna; "Village-at-the-end" and "Little village-at-the-end"), who reside in the Upper Missouri River area. The Yankton-Yanktonai are collectively also referred to by the endonym Wičhíyena ('Those Who Speak Like Men'). They also have distinct federally recognized tribes. In the past the Western Dakota have been erroneously classified as Nakota, who are located in Montana and across the border in Canada, where they are known as Stoney.

== Name ==
The word Dakota means "ally or friend" in the Dakota language, and their autonyms include Ikčé Wičhášta ("Indian people") and Dakhóta Oyáte ("Dakota people").

== Ethnic groups ==
The Eastern and Western Dakota are two of the three groupings belonging to the Sioux nation (also called Dakota in a broad sense), the third being the Lakota (Thítȟuŋwaŋ or Teton). The three groupings speak dialects that are still relatively mutually intelligible. This is referred to as a common language, Dakota-Lakota, or Sioux.

The Dakota include the following bands:

- Santee division (Eastern Dakota) (Isáŋyathi, meaning "knife camp")
  - Mdewakanton (Bdewákhaŋthuŋwaŋ "Spirit Lake Village" or "people of the mystic lake")
    notable persons: Taoyateduta
  - Sisseton (Sisíthuŋwaŋ, translating to "swamp/lake/fish scale village")
  - Wahpekute (Waȟpékhute, "Leaf Archers")
    notable persons: Inkpaduta
  - Wahpeton (Waȟpéthuŋwaŋ, "Leaf Village")
- Yankton-Yanktonai division (Western Dakota) (Wičhíyena)
  - Yankton (Iháŋkthuŋwaŋ, "End Village")
  - Yanktonai (Iháŋkthuŋwaŋna, "Little End Village")
    - Upper Yanktonai
    - Húŋkpathina or Lower Yanktonai

== Language ==
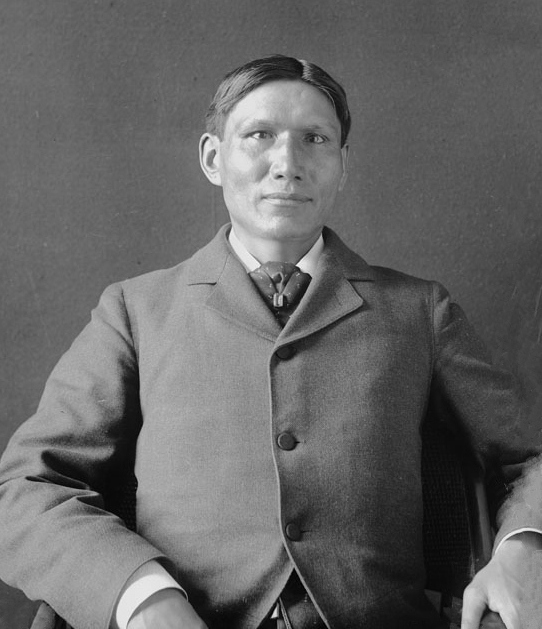
Charles Alex Eastman (1858–1939), physician, author, and co-founder of the Boy Scouts of America.

The Dakota language is a Mississippi Valley Siouan language, belonging to the greater Siouan-Catawban language family. It is closely related to and mutually intelligible with the Lakota language, and both are also more distantly related to the Stoney and Assiniboine languages. Dakota is written in the Latin script and has a dictionary and grammar.

1. Eastern Dakota (also known as Santee-Sisseton or Dakhóta)
  - Santee (Isáŋyáthi: Bdewákhathuŋwaŋ, Waȟpékhute)
  - Sisseton (Sisíthuŋwaŋ, Waȟpéthuŋwaŋ)
2. Western Dakota (or Yankton-Yanktonai or Dakȟóta)
  - Yankton (Iháŋktȟuŋwaŋ)
  - Yanktonai (Iháŋktȟuŋwaŋna)
    - Upper Yanktonai (Wičhíyena)

== History ==
Before the 17th century, the Santee Dakota (Isáŋyathi; "Knife" also known as the Eastern Dakota) lived around Lake Superior with territories in present-day northern Minnesota and Wisconsin. They gathered wild rice, hunted woodland animals and used canoes to fish. Wars with the Ojibwe throughout the 1700s pushed the Dakota into southern Minnesota, where the Western Dakota (Yankton, Yanktonai) and Teton (Lakota) were residing. In the 1800s, the Dakota signed treaties with the United States, ceding much of their land in Minnesota. Failure of the United States to make treaty payments on time, as well as low food supplies, led to the Dakota War of 1862, which resulted in the Dakota being exiled from Minnesota to numerous reservations in Nebraska, North and South Dakota and Canada. After 1870, the Dakota people began to return to Minnesota, creating the present-day reservations in the state.

The Yankton and Yanktonai Dakota (Iháŋktȟuŋwaŋ and Iháŋktȟuŋwaŋna; "Village-at-the-end" and "Little village-at-the-end"), collectively also referred to by the endonym Wičhíyena, resided in the Minnesota River area before ceding their land and moving to South Dakota in 1858. Despite ceding their lands, their treaty with the U.S. government allowed them to maintain their traditional role in the Očhéthi Šakówiŋ as the caretakers of the Pipestone Quarry, which is the cultural center of the Sioux people. They are considered to be the Western Dakota (also called middle Sioux), and have in the past been erroneously classified as Nakota. The actual Nakota are the Assiniboine and Stoney of Western Canada and Montana.

=== Santee (Isáŋyathi or Eastern Dakota) ===
Migrations of Ojibwe people from the east in the 17th and 18th centuries, who were armed with muskets supplied by the French and British, pushed the Dakota further into Minnesota and west and southward. The US gave the name "Dakota Territory" to the northern expanse west of the Mississippi River and up to its headwaters.

After the Dakota War of 1862, the federal government expelled the Santee (who included the Mdewakanton) from Minnesota. Many were sent to Crow Creek Indian Reservation east of the Missouri River in what is now South Dakota. In 1864 some from the Crow Creek Reservation were sent to St. Louis and then traveled by boat up the Missouri River, ultimately to the Santee Sioux Reservation.

In the 21st century, the majority of the Santee live on reservations and reserves, and many in small and larger cities in Minnesota, Nebraska, South Dakota, North Dakota, and Canada. They went to cities for more work opportunities and improved living conditions.

=== Iháŋkthuŋwaŋ-Iháŋkthuŋwaŋna (Yankton-Yanktonai or Western Dakota) ===
The Iháŋkthuŋwaŋ-Iháŋkthuŋwaŋna, also known by the anglicized spelling Yankton (Iháŋkthuŋwaŋ: "End village") and Yanktonai (Iháŋkthuŋwaŋna: "Little end village") divisions consist of two bands or two of the seven council fires. According to Nasunatanka and Matononpa in 1880, the Yanktonai are divided into two sub-groups known as the Upper Yanktonai and the Lower Yanktonai (Húŋkpathina).

They were involved in quarrying pipestone. The Yankton-Yanktonai moved into northern Minnesota. In the 18th century, they were recorded as living in the Mankato (Maka To – Earth Blue/Blue Earth) region of southwestern Minnesota along the Blue Earth River.

Most of the Yankton live on the Yankton Indian Reservation in southeastern South Dakota. Some Yankton live on the Lower Brule Indian Reservation and Crow Creek Reservation, which is also occupied by the Lower Yanktonai. The Upper Yanktonai live in the northern part of the Standing Rock Sioux Reservation, and on the Spirit Lake Reservation, in areas within central North Dakota. Others live in the eastern half of the Fort Peck Indian Reservation in northeastern Montana. In addition, they reside at several Canadian reserves, including Birdtail, Oak Lake, and Whitecap (formerly Moose Woods).

== Modern geographic divisions ==
The Dakota maintain many separate tribal governments scattered across several reservations and communities in North America: in the Dakotas, Minnesota, Nebraska, and Montana in the United States; and in Manitoba, southern Saskatchewan in Canada.

The earliest known European record of the Dakota identified them in Minnesota, Iowa, and Wisconsin. After the introduction of the horse in the early 18th century, the Sioux dominated larger areas of land—from present day Central Canada to the Platte River, from Minnesota to the Yellowstone River, including the Powder River country.

=== Modern reservations, reserves, and communities of the Sioux ===
Reserve/Reservation	Community	Bands residing	Location
Fort Peck Indian Reservation	Assiniboine and Sioux Tribes	Hunkpapa, Upper Yanktonai (Pabaksa), Sisseton, Wahpeton, and the Hudesabina (Red Bottom), Wadopabina (Canoe Paddler), Wadopahnatonwan (Canoe Paddlers Who Live on the Prairie), Sahiyaiyeskabi (Plains Cree-Speakers), Inyantonwanbina (Stone People) and Fat Horse Band of the Assiniboine	Montana, United States
Spirit Lake Reservation _{(Formerly Devil's Lake Reservation)}	Spirit Lake Tribe _{(Mni Wakan Oyate)}	Wahpeton, Sisseton, Upper Yanktonai	North Dakota, USA
Standing Rock Indian Reservation	Standing Rock Sioux Tribe	Lower Yanktonai, Sihasapa, Upper Yanktonai, Hunkpapa	North Dakota, South Dakota, USA
Lake Traverse Indian Reservation	Sisseton Wahpeton Oyate	Sisseton, Wahpeton	South Dakota, USA
Flandreau Indian Reservation	Flandreau Santee Sioux Tribe	Mdewakanton, Wahpekute, Wahpeton	South Dakota, USA
Crow Creek Indian Reservation	Crow Creek Sioux Tribe	Lower Yanktonai, Mdewakanton	South Dakota, USA
Yankton Sioux Indian Reservation	Yankton Sioux Tribe	Yankton	South Dakota, USA
Upper Sioux Indian Reservation	Upper Sioux Community _{(Pejuhutazizi Oyate)}	Mdewakanton, Sisseton, Wahpeton	Minnesota, USA
Lower Sioux Indian Reservation	Lower Sioux Indian Community	Mdewakanton, Wahpekute	Minnesota, USA
Shakopee-Mdewakanton Indian Reservation _{(Formerly Prior Lake Indian Reservation)}	Shakopee Mdewakanton Sioux Community	Mdewakanton, Wahpekute	Minnesota, USA
Prairie Island Indian Community	Prairie Island Indian Community	Mdewakanton, Wahpekute	Minnesota, USA
Santee Indian Reservation	Santee Sioux Nation	Mdewakanton, Wahpekute	Nebraska, USA
Sioux Valley Dakota Nation Reserve, Fishing Station 62A Reserve*	Sioux Valley First Nation	Sisseton, Mdewakanton, Wahpeton, Wahpekute	Manitoba, Canada
Dakota Plains Indian Reserve 6A	Dakota Plains Wahpeton First Nation	Wahpeton, Sisseton	Manitoba, Canada
Dakota Tipi 1 Reserve	Dakota Tipi First Nation	Wahpeton	Manitoba, Canada
Birdtail Creek 57 Reserve, Birdtail Hay Lands 57A Reserve, Fishing Station 62A Reserve*	Birdtail Sioux First Nation	Mdewakanton, Wahpekute, Yanktonai	Manitoba, Canada
Canupawakpa Dakota First Nation, Oak Lake 59A Reserve, Fishing Station 62A Reserve*	Canupawakpa Dakota First Nation	Wahpekute, Wahpeton, Yanktonai	Manitoba, Canada
Standing Buffalo 78	Standing Buffalo Dakota Nation	Sisseton, Wahpeton	Saskatchewan, Canada
Whitecap 94 Reserve	Whitecap Dakota First Nation	Wahpeton, Sisseton	Saskatchewan, Canada
Wahpaton 94A, Wahpaton 94B	Wahpeton Dakota Nation	Wahpeton	Saskatchewan, Canada
Wood Mountain 160 Reserve, Treaty Four Reserve Grounds Indian Reserve No. 77*	Wood Mountain	Hunkpapa	Saskatchewan, Canada

(* Reserves shared with other First Nations)

== Archery ==
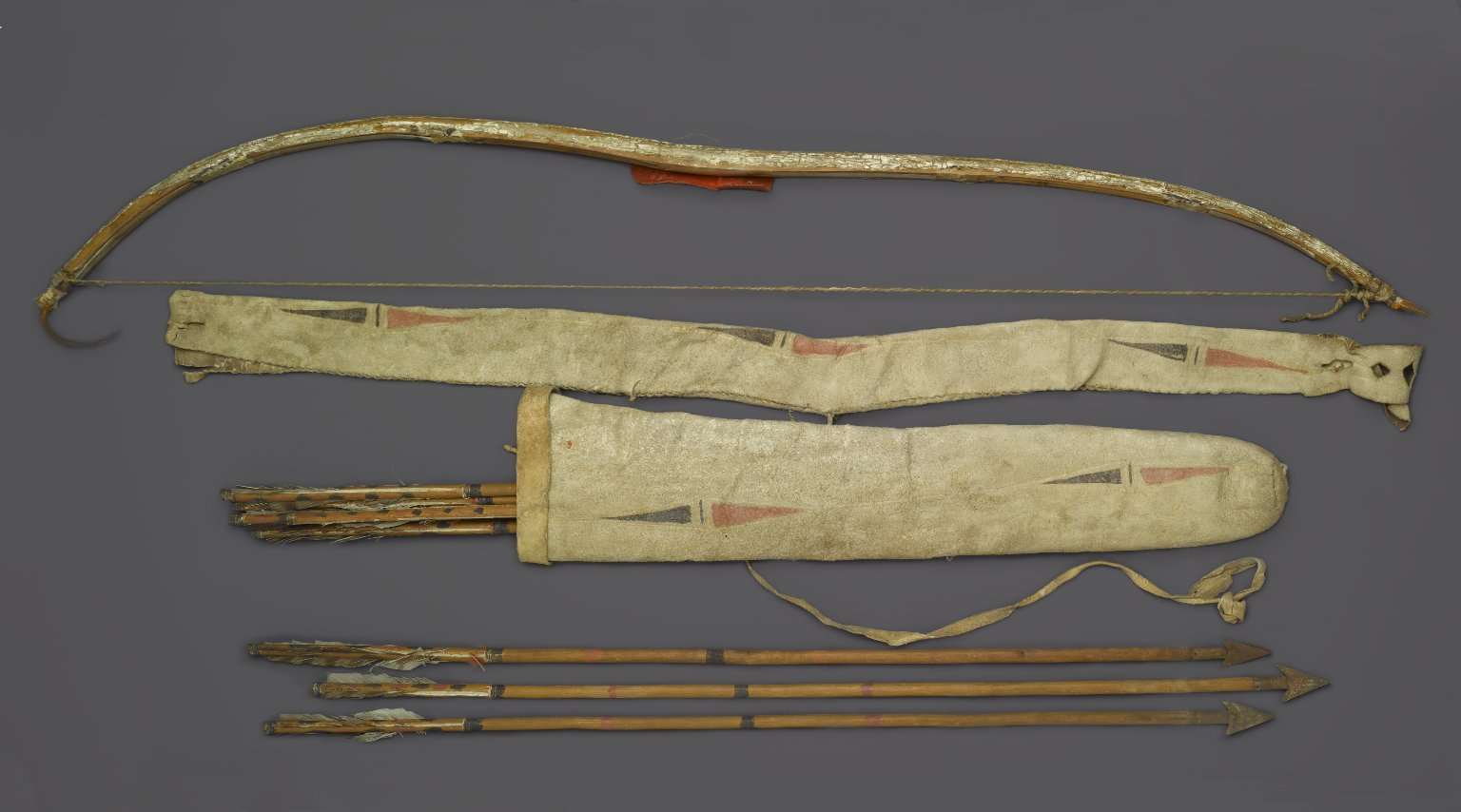
Probably Yankton, Sioux. Bow, Bow Case, Arrows and Quiver at the Brooklyn Museum

The Yankton excelled at archery. Made from local materials, the tribe used bows and arrows to hunt deer, antelope, and small game. Reportedly, the Yankton could kill a bison with each arrow in a quiver.

=== Bows ===
Another example of a Yankton bow was collected in 1869 and is kept by the Department of Anthropology at the National Archives. It is made from either ash or white oak and is sinew backed. The sinew is coated with a white, chalky material to prevent moisture from loosening the bands. There are remains of red pigment on the belly of the bow, and four red slashes are painted on the back of each limb. The bow is only 45.25 inches tip to tip, and with thick limbs is very strong. The bowstring is two-ply sinew. "The sinew string is broken but well made and is permanently tied to the bottom limb with a slip knot.

=== Arrows ===
The Smithsonian has Yankton arrows also collected in 1869, that have metal arrowheads. The four arrows range from 23.75 inches (shortest) to 26.25 inches (longest). Unlike most Sioux arrows from the time and region, these were made from split hickory instead of shoots. With their iron broad-head arrowheads, the arrows could have deep penetration power with the thick hickory shafts. The arrows are fletched two hawk feathers each, and one turkey feather used as the cock feather. They are attached with animal glue and sinew string. Blue and green paint is evident underneath the feathers. The nocks are widely flared,

=== Quivers and case ===
A Sioux quiver and bow case was donated to the archives in 1892. It is brain-tanned buckskin with beadwork at the top and bottom. Fringe was sewn with sinew to the top and bottom. The quiver is 26.5 inches long, and the bow case is 46 3/8 inches long.

== Notable Dakota people ==
=== Historical ===
- Hazaiyankawin (Azayamankawin), Mdewakanton Dakota woman who ran canoe ferry service in Saint Paul, Minnesota
- Inkpaduta (Scarlet Point/Red End), Wahpekute Dakota war chief
- Ištáȟba (Sleepy Eye), Sisseton Dakota chief
- Maḣpiya Wic̣aṡṭa (Cloud Man), Mdewakanton Dakota chief
- Ohíyes'a (Charles Eastman), Dakota author, physician and reformer who helped found the Boy Scouts of America
- Snana (Maggie Brass), Mdewakanton woman who saved Mary Schwandt during the U.S.–Dakota War of 1862
- Tamaha (One Eye/Standing Moose), Mdewekanton Dakota scout for the U.S. during the War of 1812
- Thaóyate Dúta (Little Crow III/His Red Nation), Mdewakanton Dakota chief of Kaposia band and military leader during U.S.–Dakota War of 1862
- Ti'wakan (Gabriel Renville), Sisseton Wahpeton chief from 1866 to 1892
- Wapahaśa (Wabasha II), head chief of Mdewakanton Dakota and Kiyuksa band in early 1800s
- Wapahaśa (Wabasha III), head chief of the Santee Sioux
- Wánataŋ (Wanata), Yanktonai Dakota chief
- Wánataŋ (Wanata#Chief Wanataan II), Sisseton Dakota chief, son of the former
- Waŋbdí Okíčhize (War Eagle), Yankton Dakota chief of Santee origin
- Waŋbdí Tháŋka (Big Eagle), Mdewakanton Dakota sub-chief
- Zitkala-Ša (Gertrude Simmons Bonnin, 1876–1938), Yankton author, educator, musician and political activist

=== Contemporary ===
- Ella Cara Deloria (1889 – 1971), author, ethnographer, linguist
- Vine Deloria Jr. (1933–2005), Standing Rock author, activist, historian and theologian
- Floyd Red Crow Westerman/Kanghi Duta (1936–2007), Sisseton Wahpeton actor
- John Trudell (1946–2015), Santee activist, American Indian Movement leader
- Mazuha Hokshina (Oscar Howe, 1915-1983), Yanktonai Dakota, artist

Contemporary Sioux people are also listed under the tribes to which they belong:

==== By individual tribe ====
- Assiniboine and Sioux Tribes of the Fort Peck Indian Reservation
- Crow Creek Sioux Tribe of the Crow Creek Reservation
- Flandreau Santee Sioux Tribe
- Lower Brule Sioux Tribe of the Lower Brule Reservation
- Shakopee Mdewakanton Sioux Community
- Sisseton Wahpeton Oyate
- Standing Rock Sioux Tribe of North and South Dakota
- Yankton Sioux Tribe of South Dakota
- Spirit Lake Dakota Tribe of the Spirit Lake Reservation

== See also ==
- Bdóte
  - Bdote Memory Map
