= Standing Buffalo 78 =

Indian reserve in Saskatchewan, Canada

Coordinates: 50°49′46″N 103°53′32″W

- Indian reserve
- Standing Buffalo Indian Reserve No. 78
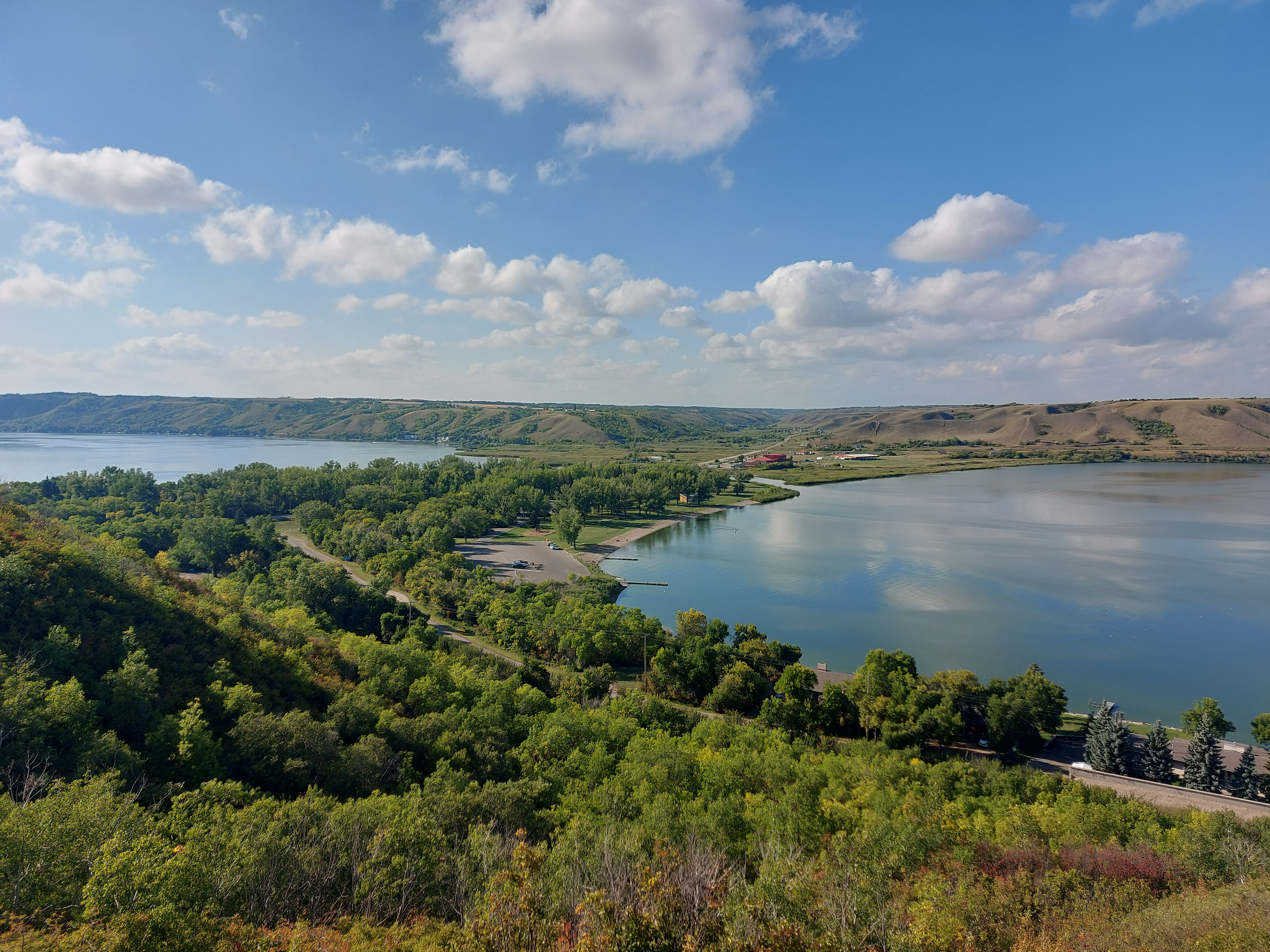
- Pasqua (left) and Echo (right) Lakes with Echo Valley Provincial Park and Standing Buffalo 78 Indian reserve in the middle

- Location in Saskatchewan
- First Nation: Standing Buffalo
- Country: Canada
- Province: Saskatchewan

Area
  - Total: 2,246.1 ha (5,550 acres)

Population (2016)
  - Total: 569
  - Density: 25.3/km^{2} (65.6/sq mi)
- Community Well-Being Index: 59

Standing Buffalo 78 is an Indian reserve of the Standing Buffalo Dakota Nation in Saskatchewan. It is about 8 kilometres (5.0 mi) north-west of Fort Qu'Appelle. In the 2016 Canadian Census, it recorded a population of 569 living in 184 of its 198 total private dwellings. In the same year, its Community Well-Being index was calculated at 59 of 100, compared to 58.4 for the average First Nations community and 77.5 for the average non-Indigenous community.

The reserve is located in the Qu'Appelle Valley, between Pasqua and Echo Lakes, on the north side.

== See also ==
- List of Indian reserves in Saskatchewan
