= Long Plain First Nation =

- Band No. 287
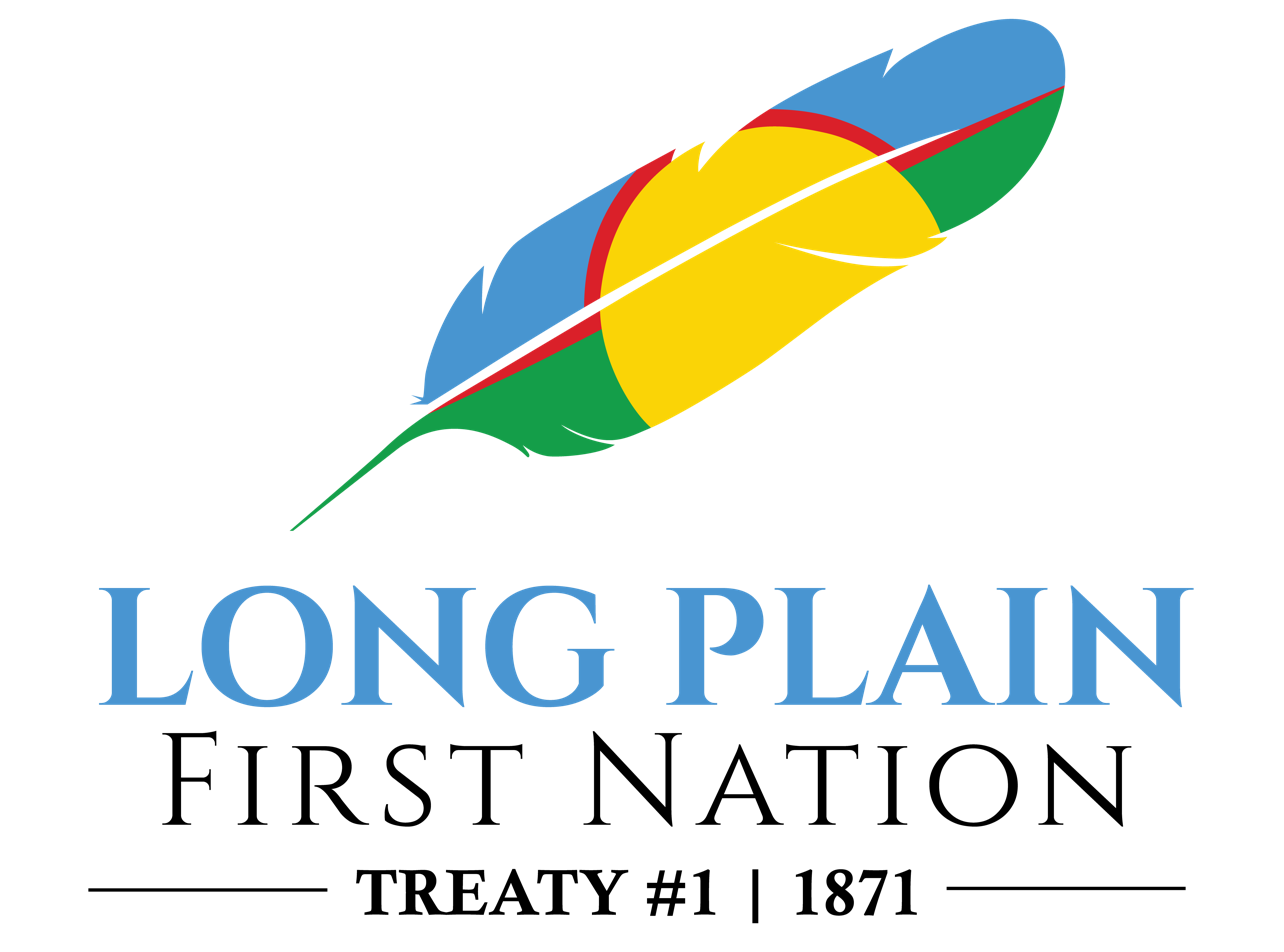
- People: Ojibway and Dakota
- Treaty: Treaty 1
- Headquarters: 111 Yellowquill Trail East; Long Plain Reserve No.6; Box 430 Portage la Prairie, MB, R1N 3B7

Land
- Main reserve: Long Plain Reserve No. 6
- Reserves: Keeshkeemaquah Reserve and Madison Indian Reserve #1
- Land area: 44 km^{2} (17 sq mi)

Population (2016)
- On reserve: 1,232
- Total population: 4,658 (2023)

Government
- Chief: David Meeches
- Council: Marvin Daniels, Garnet Meeches, Randy Merrick, and Liz Merrick

Tribal Council
- Dakota Ojibway Tribal Council

Website
- lpband.ca

The Long Plain First Nation (Ojibwe: Gaa-ginooshkodeyaag) is an Ojibway and Dakota First Nations band government in Manitoba, Canada. (It also hosts a small number of Cree people as well.)

Situated on a land base of 44 km^{2} (10,800 acres) primarily located in the Central Plains Region of Manitoba, its reserve lands include the Long Plain Reserve #6, the Keeshkeemaquah Reserve near Portage La Prairie, and the Madison Indian Reserve #1—the first urban reserve in Winnipeg.

It is located to the southwest of Portage la Prairie along the Assiniboine River. It lies between the Rural Municipality of Portage la Prairie and the Rural Municipality of South Norfolk, and also borders another band's reserve, that of the Dakota Plains First Nation.

The current chief of the Long Plain First Nation is David Meeches, who was elected in December 2023, returning to the post after his tenure ended in 2013. Meeches replaced Kyra Wilson, who was the second female Chief in Long Plain history.

== Reserves ==
The First Nation has 3 reserve lands:

- Long Plain Reserve No. 6 — located in the Central Plains Region of Manitoba, 14 km (8.7 mi) southwest of Portage La Prairie, 98 km (61 mi) west of Winnipeg, and 10 km (6.2 mi) south of Manitoba Highway 1.
- Keeshkeemaquah Reserve — located near Portage La Prairie.
- Madison Indian Reserve #1 — an urban reserve located in Winnipeg.

=== Long Plain Reserve No. 6 ===
Long Plain 6
- Indian reserve
- Long Plain Reserve No. 6
- Location within Manitoba
- Coordinates: 49.8406028°N 98.494848°W
- Country: Canada
- Province: Manitoba

Area
  - Land: 34.85 km^{2} (13.46 sq mi)

Population (2016)
  - Total: 1,232
  - Density: 35.4/km^{2} (92/sq mi)

Long Plain Reserve No. 6—located in the Central Plains Region of Manitoba, 14 km (8.7 mi) southwest of Portage La Prairie—is the main reserve of Long Plain First Nation.

The reserve is home to various amenities, including Arrowhead Grocery, a grocery store opened in 2016; Arrowhead Internet Services, a wireless internet service provider that provides broadband connectivity to underserved markets; and Crossing Gas Bar.

=== Keeshkeemaquah Reserve ===
The Keeshkeemaquah Reserve is located near Portage La Prairie.

Overlooking the Crescent Lake in Portage la Prairie, these lands were originally used as the site of a residential school called Portage la Prairie Presbyterian Indian Residential School (or simply the Portage la Prairie Indian Residential School).

The land was first set aside as reserve i)n August 1981 in recognition of an outstanding treaty land entitlement. The former residential school building was renovated in 1984 and became home to the Yellowquill College (before the college moved to Winnipeg in 2000).

In 2000, the Long Plain First Nation Council entered into a 50-year head lease (now extended to 75 years) with Arrowhead Development Corp. The lands were designated for education and training purposes, later allowing for ancillary purposes.

Today, the lands are subleased to the Keeshkeemaquah Conference and Gaming Centre, Miskwaanakwadook Office Building (opened in 2006), Arrowhead Gas Bar, Rufus Prince Building, White Cross Drugs and Walk-in Clinic, and Long Plain Housing Authority. The reserve is also home to a Microtel Inn and Suites by Wyndham.

The Dakota Ojibway Tribal Council's head office is located on this reserve.

=== Madison Reserve #1 ===
Madison Reserve #1 is an urban reserve located in Winnipeg, to the west of the Polo Park Shopping Centre.

This property was purchased from Manitoba Hydro in 2006. With the land spanning 11,400 m^{2} (2.81 acres), the purchase included a 2,733.9 m^{2} (29,427 ft^{2}) building, 4,471 m^{2} (48,130 ft^{2}) asphalt parking lot, and an additional 3,950 m^{2} (42,500 ft^{2}) gravel parking lot.

In July 2010, Long Plain and the City of Winnipeg executed a municipal services and development agreement, setting the stage for the development of the 3-acre parcel.

In 2011, a significant portion of the 2,600 m^{2} (28,000 ft^{2}) building that existed there on 480 Madison was renovated and leased to the Yellowquill College Inc.; the remaining space was renovated in 2012 for office space and was leased to Aboriginal Peoples Television Network (APTN), Manito Ahbee, Eagle Vision, and Treaty Relations Commission of Manitoba.

On May 23, 2013, the site officially attained reserve status and became the first urban reserve in Winnipeg.

The reserve is now home to Wyndham Garden Winnipeg Airport, Madison Petro-Canada gas and convenience store, and the 480 Madison Building. The 480 Madison building continues to house Yellowquill College, Manito Ahbee, Eagle Vision, and the Treaty Relations Commission, as well as being home to the Manitoba First Nations Education Resource Council, Saint Elizabeth First Nations Inuit and Métis Program, Setoskatowin, and the Assembly of Manitoba Chiefs.

== Community and amenities ==
Arrowhead Development Corporation (ADC) is a development corporation that manages Long Plain band-owned businesses on and off-reserve, established to develop business concepts and incorporate businesses under a development corporation. Under ADC, Long Plain First Nation owns and operates Rez Radio 101.7 FM, which services the Long Plain community.

Long Plain First Nation Annual Pow-wow began in 1876 and is one of Manitoba's longest running pow-wow celebrations. The contest usually occurs during August long weekend from Friday evening to Sunday night.

Residents of the region have included artist Linus Woods.

The Long Plain First Nation operates the Long Plain School (Kindergarten to Grade 8). The original campus of Yellowquill College was located in the Rufus Prince Building, which was previously used as the Portage La Prairie Presbyterian Indian Residential School on the Keeshkeemaquah Reserve. Current tenants of the Rufus Prince Building include Manitoba First Nations Police Service, Long Plain First Nation Trust Long Plain Lands Department, and Long Plain Gaming Commission.

The Manitoba First Nations Police Service, established in 1977 by the Dakota Ojibway Tribal Council, is a recognized self-administered First Nation police agency that operates out of Long Plain No. 6.

== See also ==
- First Nations in Manitoba
- Dakota Ojibway Tribal Council
