= Wahpaton 94B =

Indian reserve in Saskatchewan, Canada

Coordinates: 53°14′17″N 105°42′10″W

- Indian reserve
- Wahpaton Indian Reserve No. 94B
- Location in Saskatchewan
- First Nation: Wahpeton
- Country: Canada
- Province: Saskatchewan

Area
  - Total: 65 ha (160 acres)

Wahpaton 94B is an Indian reserve of the Wahpeton Dakota Nation in Saskatchewan.

== See also ==
- List of Indian reserves in Saskatchewan
