= Wahpaton 94A =

Indian reserve in Saskatchewan, Canada

Coordinates: 53°16′33″N 105°52′42″W

- Indian reserve
- Wahpaton Indian Reserve No. 94A
- Location in Saskatchewan
- First Nation: Wahpeton
- Country: Canada
- Province: Saskatchewan

Area
  - Total: 1,482 ha (3,660 acres)

Population (2016)
  - Total: 309
  - Density: 20.9/km^{2} (54.0/sq mi)
- Community Well-Being Index: 58

Wahpaton 94A is an Indian reserve of the Wahpeton Dakota Nation in Saskatchewan. It is about 10 kilometres (6.2 mi) north of Prince Albert. In the 2016 Canadian Census, it recorded a population of 309 living in 70 of its 80 total private dwellings. In the same year, its Community Well-Being index was calculated at 58 of 100, compared to 58.4 for the average First Nations community and 77.5 for the average non-Indigenous community.

== See also ==
- List of Indian reserves in Saskatchewan
