= University and College Entrance Preparation Program =

The University and College Entrance Preparation Program (UCEPP) is a financial aid program in Canada for First Nation students. Created in 1983, it aims to enable these students to gain entrance to post secondary education by providing financial support to First nation students who are already enrolled in accepted universities and college entrance preparation programs. Determining the UCEPP's selection criteria and allocation of funding, as well as administering the selection and review process, is the duty of the First Nations (or organizations designated by First Nations), albeit with the established guidelines of the national program. As of September 2026, eligible costs include tuition, school books, travel support (the commute to or from the college or university), and living allowances.

== Eligibility Requirements ==
In order to be eligible, students must be registered under the Indian Act and maintain satisfactory academic performance under an accepted university, college, or other post-secondary education institution.
