= Little Grand Rapids First Nation =

Little Grand Rapids 14
- Indian reserve
- Indian Reserve 14
- Location within Manitoba
- Coordinates: 52.000°N 95.417°W

Area
  - Land: 22.43 km^{2} (8.66 sq mi)

Population (2016)
  - Total: 810
- Little Grand Rapids First Nation
- Band No. 270
- Treaty: Treaty 5
- Headquarters: Little Grand Rapids
- Province: Manitoba

Population
- On reserve: 1368 (2019)
- Off reserve: 385
- Total population: 1753

Government
- Chief: Clinton Keeper

Tribal Council
- Southeast Resource Development Council

Little Grand Rapids First Nation (Ojibwe: Mishi-baawitigong) is a remote Anishinaabe (Saulteaux/Ojibwa) First Nation community in northeast Manitoba, located approximately 370 kilometres (230 mi) northeast of Winnipeg.

It is a fly-in community.

On 4 October 2020, a COVID-19 outbreak was declared in Little Grand Rapids. With 33 confirmed cases at the time, it had the highest number of cases of any First Nation in Manitoba.

== Reserve ==
The First Nation has one reserve: Little Grand Rapids 14, which is located across the channel in the Family Lake from the community of Little Grand Rapids.

== Governance ==
Little Grand Rapids First Nation is governed by the Act Electoral System of government. The current leadership as of 2021 includes Chief Oliver Owen, and Councillors Clinton Keeper, Diane Keeper, Roy Dunsford, Hilda Crow, Cher Kejick, and Blair Owen.

Little Grand Rapids First Nation is a member of the Southeast Resource Development Council and a signatory to Treaty 5.
