= Long Plain First Nation Annual Pow-wow =

Long Plain First Nation Annual Pow-wow is one of Manitoba’s longest running pow-wow celebrations. It began in 1876. The contest usually occurs during August long week-end from Friday evening to Sunday night. Long Plain First Nation (Ojibway) is a First Nation identified by AANDC as Indian Band No. 6. The community is located in the Central Plains region of Manitoba, to the southwest of Portage la Prairie along the Assiniboine River, and lies between the Rural Municipality of Portage la Prairie and the Rural Municipality of South Norfolk.

Each year before the celebration, Long Plain celebrates their Annual Treaty Day which commemorates the signing of Treaty #1 that took place on August 3, 1871. The main pow wow event is planned by a volunteer pow-wow committee that gathers for meetings throughout the year. The goal of the pow-wow each year is to be bigger and better. Along with the many dancers and singers from United States and Canada, the event includes the Friday Midnight Men's Fancy Dance special. The dance competitions are judged by Long Plain band members and since the band members do not compete they have a showcase of local dancers. The 2021 celebration is the 139th annual and will take place 06–8 August.

There were no pow-wows in 1917–18, 1942–45 & 2020.
