= Berens River First Nation =

- Band No. 266
- Treaty: Treaty 5
- Headquarters: Berens River, Manitoba

Land
- Main reserve: Berens River 13
- Reserve: Pigeon River 13A
- Land area: 25.469 km^{2} (9.834 sq mi)

Population (2019)
- On reserve: 2220
- Off reserve: 1326
- Total population: 3546

Government
- Chief: Hartley Everett

Tribal Council
- Southeast Resource Development Council

Website
- www.berensriver.ca

Berens River First Nation (Ojibwe: Mememwi-ziibiing) is a First Nations band government in Manitoba, Canada. The First Nation has two reserves: Berens River 13 and Pigeon River 13A, located in the boreal forest east of Lake Winnipeg. The First Nation is governed by a chief and five councillors.

Berens River is a member of the Southeast Resource Development Council with offices in Winnipeg. This Tribal Council has 9 member First Nations.

The settlement of Berens River, Manitoba, with a population of 111 people in 2011 borders the main settlement of Berens River 13 with a population of 1,028 in 2011. The two communities create a population centre, also called Berens River, at the mouth of the Berens River. Both are served by the Berens River Airport.

== History ==
The river Berens River was originally called Pigeon River and the name Pigeon River was given to the next river to the south.

== Demographics ==
As of February 2015, the registered membership of the Berens River First Nation was 3,246 with 2,110 members living on-reserve and 1,136 members off-reserve.

The settlement of Berens River 13 had a population of 1,028 in 2011.

Canada census – Berens River 13 community profile

	2021	2011
Population	1,161 (+11.7% from 2016)	1,028 (+39.1% from 2006)
Land area	26.15 km^{2} (10.10 sq mi)	24.53 km^{2} (9.47 sq mi)
Population density	44.4/km^{2} (115/sq mi)	41.9/km^{2} (109/sq mi)
Median age	23.0 (M: 22.8, F: 23.2)	21.6 (M: 21.6, F: 21.6)
Private dwellings	321 (total) 263 (occupied)	278 (total)
Median household income	$67,500

References: 2021 2011

== Territory ==
Location of Berens River 13 in Manitoba

Berens River First Nation has two reserves.

- Berens River 13 is 2,546.90 hectares (6,293.5 acres) 52.3492°N 96.9889°W at the mouth of Berens River on the eastern shore of Lake Winnipeg and along the Berens River.
- Pigeon River 13A is 344.80 hectares (852.0 acres) 52.2383°N 96.9811°W along the Pigeon River located south of the Berens River.

== Notable people ==
- Jacob Berens [Nah-wee-kee-sick-quah-yash] (c.1832 – 1916)
- William Berens [Tabasigizikweas] (1866–1947)
- Jamie Leach, ice hockey player who played for the 1992 Pittsburgh Penguins Stanley Cup champions
- Reggie Leach, Canadian ice hockey player, Stanley Cup winner, NHL All-Star and 1976 Canada Cup champion for team Canada.
