= Dakota Plains First Nation =

Dakota Plains First Nation, Dakota Plains Wahpeton Oyate, or Wakhpetunwin Otinta (Waȟpéthuŋwaŋ Otina Dakhóta Oyáte, "Leaf dwellers") is a Wahpeton band Dakota First Nations entity southwest of Portage la Prairie, Manitoba. It borders the somewhat larger Long Plain First Nation, as well as the Rural Municipality of Portage la Prairie and the Municipality of Norfolk Treherne.

Dakota Plains First Nation has never signed a treaty with Canada. When the Canadian government was negotiating the Numbered Treaties with Ojibwe First Nations in the region, Canada excluded the Dakotas, stating that they were refugees from the United States (descendants of Chief Taoyateduta, known as Little Crow), and thus had no Aboriginal title claim to lands that were taken over by Canada. This claim is disputed by the Dakota nations themselves, as well as by historians and archeologists, such as Manitoba historian James Morrison says the Dakotas were in Canada before the Europeans arrived. "The historical evidence indicates that there were Dakota settlements in the 18th and early 19th century, at various times, in southern Saskatchewan, as well as Manitoba and northwest Ontario," Morrison said in an interview with CBC.

== History ==
Prior to 1920, the Dakota Plains First Nation lived within the city limits of Portage la Prairie, to the south of the city. They were wage workers, and they pooled their extra salaries and bought the property they resided on in 1893 (via a trustee, as native people were not allowed to purchase land).(49°56′42″N 98°17′26″W) After the purchase they started to build homes and constructed roads and streets. Along with the homes came wells, gardens and all the necessities to make a well-established, self-sustaining community, even including a church. The Dakotas were very successful in their daily lives and were economically self-sustaining. However, this came to an end on March 11, 1920, when the city council of Portage la Prairie passed a motion to "remove" the Dakotas from the city and have them relocated to a further away location, citing "their habits of drinkng and immorality". The Canadian Federal Government in their ignorance– assuming the Dakota were treaty, would become treaty or would assimilate or better yet become extinct– acted on the motion that proceeded to move the families to this location after negotiating with Council of Long Plain First Nation for the land. The property itself was seized without compensation, the village destroyed, and today farmlands exist on top. The only thing remaining of the village today is the cemetery. Thus, some residents relocated to Long Plain First Nation's reserve, and others to another lot owned by the Dakotas, which is today recognized as Dakota Tipi First Nation.

In the new location, the only means of survival was hunting, trapping, and eventually farming, which turned out to be a success for the Dakotas. People from adjoining communities came to depend on the Dakota farm for produce, chickens, turkeys and cows being raised. However, the non-Aboriginal farmers in the area took exception to the “Indian” farmer and complained to the Department of Indian Affairs. Again, the Canadian government interfered and placed an Indian Agent near the community next door (Long Plain) and took control of the farm; putting an end to the Dakota farmers’ free trade. This caused failures in all areas, to the eventual demise of the farm. The sale of farmland to non-indigenous settlers and the erection of fences and "private property" signs also meant an end to hunting and trapping. So, the Dakota had no means of survival by then. The Dakota were introduced to the welfare system in the 1950s, which was the final demise in attempts at creating the now remote self-sustaining community.

== Modern era ==
In 1972, the Dakota Plains First Nation were finally recognized as a distinct first nation community by the Federal government, which meant that they would become entitled to some benefits that are guaranteed to "Status Indians". However, the lack of treaty between the Dakotas and the Federal government, has meant that the tribe has been excluded from much more rights and entitlement that neighboring treaty tribes have received. Today, the Dakota Plains First Nation is one of the most impoverished communities in Canada, and it has no location for any type of economic development project, as the tribe's reserve is surrounded and within the lands of the Long Plain First Nation, leaving the Dakota Plains unintentionally at the whim of the larger next-door First Nation.

Since 2009, Canada has acknowledged that it has reversed its position that the Dakota are considered "descendants of refugees" and they are indeed considered indigenous to what's known today as Manitoba. This means that the Dakota can enter negotiation for acknowledgement of their Aboriginal title claim, and they can also demand compensation for illegally seized property in Portage la Prairie.
