= Brokenhead Ojibway Nation =

- Band No. 261
- People: Saulteaux/Ojibwa
- Treaty: Treaty 1

Land
- Main reserve: Brokenhead 4
- Reserves: Birch Landing; Na-Sha-Ke-Penais
- Land area: 54.128 km^{2} (20.899 sq mi)

Population
- On reserve: 801
- Off reserve: 1311
- Total population: 2112

Government
- Chief: Gordon Bluesky

Tribal Council
- Southeast Resource Development Council

Website
- brokenheadojibwaynation.ca

Brokenhead Ojibway Nation (BON, Ojibwe: Baaskaandibewi-ziibiing, meaning at the brokenhead River) is an Anishinaabe (Saulteaux/Ojibwa) First Nation located approximately 64 kilometres (40 mi) northeast of Winnipeg, Manitoba.

The main reserve of Brokenhead 4 is surrounded by the Rural Municipality of St. Clements, except for a small lakeshore on Lake Winnipeg.

== Reserves ==
The First Nation have reserved for themselves three reserves:

- Birch Landing (50.658214°N 96.59016°W) — totalling a size of 2.72 km^{2} (670 acres); surrounded by the Rural Municipality of Alexander.
- Brokenhead 4 — serves as their main reserve, totalling a size of 54.128 km^{2} (13,375 acres); it is surrounded by the Rural Municipality of St. Clements and contains the settlement of Scanterbury, Manitoba.
- Na-Sha-Ke-Penais (49.959091°N 97.01918°W) — totalling a size of 3 hectares (7.4 acres); surrounded by East St. Paul.

=== Brokenhead 4 ===
Brokenhead 4
- Indian reserve
- Location within Manitoba
- Coordinates: 50.3580555°N 96.6030556°W
- Country: Canada
- Province: Manitoba
- Region: Eastman

Area
  - Land: 55.13 km^{2} (21.29 sq mi)

Population (2016)
  - Total: 516

Brokenhead 4 serves as the main reserve of Brokenhead Ojibway Nation. It is situated along Manitoba Highway 59 (PTH 59), with Winnipeg located 82 km (51 mi) to its south and Grand Beach, Patricia Beach, and Victoria Beach to its north, all along PTH 59.

Totalling a size of 54.128 km^{2} (13,375 acres), it is surrounded by the Rural Municipality of St. Clements and extends north to the shores of Lake Winnipeg. It contains the settlement of Scanterbury, Manitoba, as well as part of the Netley Creek Marsh area. Within Scanterbury is South Beach Casino, which is owned by the several First Nations of the Southeast Resource Development Council (including BON).

The Brokenhead River runs through the core area of the community, while both PTH 59 and the CN Rail line cross through the northwest portion of the reserve.

== Governance ==
Brokenhead Ojibway Nation is governed by the Act Electoral System of government. The current leadership is Chief Gordon Bluesky and Councillors Allen (Sam) Hocaluk, Christopher Kent, Wendell Sinclair Jr (Ogimma)and Remi Olson. The Chief's and Councillors' two-year elected term began on April 18, 2022, and will conclude in April 2024. Brokenhead Ojibway Nation is a member of the Southeast Resource Development Council and a signatory to Treaty 1.
