= Roseau River Anishinabe First Nation =

Roseau River No. 2
- Indian reserve
- Roseau River Anishinabe First Nation
- Coordinates: 49°10′04″N 97°15′58″W
- Country: Canada
- Province: Manitoba

Area
  - Total: 21.99 km^{2} (8.49 sq mi)

Population (2021)
  - Total: 564
- Roseau River Anishinabe First Nation
- Okwewanashko-ziibiing
- Treaty: Treaty 1
- Headquarters: Ginew, Manitoba

Government
- Chief: Gary Roberts

Roseau River Anishinabe First Nation (Ojibwe: Okwewanashko-ziibiing, meaning: "Rag Weed River") is an Ojibway First Nation in southern Manitoba, Canada, situated around the Roseau River.

Its main reserve is Roseau River No. 2 with a population of 564 as of the 2021 Canadian census while the First Nation has a total membership of approximately 2,000 people.

== History ==
The people of Roseau River Anishinabe First Nation have a long history in the area of the Pembina and Red River Valleys in Manitoba, Minnesota, and North Dakota. The Roseau River people had a long history with a clan system which assigned different responsibilities to various clans and societies. Collectively, the Anishinabe (Ojibway) of Manitoba, Western Ontario, North Dakota and Northern Minnesota were known in Ojibwe as the Zoong-gi-dah Anishinabe.

With the arrival of Europeans in the area, they were first called the Pembina Band due to their location in the Pembina Valley. However, as more and more settlers arrived and pushed the people away from their original lands where they hunted, they gradually abandoned these lands. Eventually, with the signing of Treaty 1 on 3 August 1871, a parcel of land was given to the peoples around the Roseau River where the community is now located. Negotiations around land claims remained unresolved until finally being settled in 2011 with an $80 million agreement, part of which is held in trust for future generations.

The community had to be evacuated in 1997, 2009, and 2011 as a result of flooding which cut off road access to the community. The community is protected by a ring dike which has prevented large inundation of the community during these floods.

== Reserve lands ==
It has a registered population of 2,152 individuals.

The First Nation has three reserves:

- Roseau River No. 2 — the First Nation's main reserve. With an area of 22.242 km^{2} (8.588 sq mi), it is bordered by the Municipality of Emerson – Franklin and the Rural Municipality of Montcalm. As of the 2011 Census, this reserve's official population was 588 inhabitants.
- Roseau Rapids No. 2A (49°12′39″N 96°56′23″W) — has an area of 3.23 km^{2} (800 acres) and is entirely surrounded by Emerson – Franklin. As of the 2011 Census, this reserve's official population was 107 inhabitants.
- Roseau River No. 2B (49°59′58″N 97°18′56″W) — has an area of 305,000 m^{2} (75.4 acres). It is located at the junctions of Highway 6 & 236 and the Perimeter Highway on the northwest side of Winnipeg, Manitoba, well over 100 km (62 mi) from the two other reserves. Not having its own Canadian census subdivision, this reserve is enumerated as part of the Rural Municipality of Rosser; as such, this reserve's population is not individually reported.

Roseau River No. 2 & 2A are located approximately 40 kilometres (25 mi) apart, and about approximately 80 kilometres (50 mi) south of Winnipeg.

== Leadership ==
Roseau River Anishinabe First Nation is a member of the Dakota Ojibway Tribal Council. The current Chief and Council are: Chief Gary Roberts; Councillor Terrance Nelson, Councillor Evan Roberts, Councillor Jason Henry and Councillor Rachel Seenie.

== Notable people ==
- Shingoose, musician

== See also ==
- First Nations in Manitoba
