= Birdtail Sioux First Nation =

- Band No. 284
- Chankagha Otinta
- People: Dakota
- Headquarters: Beulah, Manitoba

Land
- Main reserve: Birdtail Sioux
- Land area: 28.85 km^{2} (11.14 sq mi)

Government
- Chief: Tréchelle Bunn

Tribal Council
- Dakota Ojibway Tribal Council

Website
- birdtailsioux.ca

Location of the Birdtail Sioux First Nation in Manitoba

Birdtail Sioux First Nation or Chan Kagha Otina Dakhóta Oyáte (also spelt Caƞ Kaġa Dakhóta Oyáte, 'People of the Log Houses') are a Dakota First Nation located approximately 50 km north of Virden, Manitoba. The First Nation has a population of approximately 643 people on approximately 7,128 acres (28.85 km^{2}) of land.

It is bordered by the Rural Municipality of Miniota and the Rural Municipality of Ellice – Archie. The main settlement of Birdtail Sioux is located at 50°16′N 101°09′W. The First Nation has a K–12 school (Chan Kagha Otina Dakota Wayawa Tipi School) and an adult learning centre (Birdtail Sioux Adult Learning Centre), both operated by Frontier School Division; a police detachment (Manitoba First Nations Police, formerly known as Dakota Ojibway Police Service); and a health center.

== Controversial partnerships ==
Under the leadership of Chief Ken Chalmers, Birdtail Sioux's partnership with the federal Government of Canada and corporate partnerships has created some controversy. Birdtail Sioux entered into agreement with companies like Enbridge and Canadian National Railway to help build reserve projects such as the construction of a new health centre, a shopping centre, and a 62-home renovation project. Some of the other Dakota First Nations were concerned that the Birdtail Sioux's attempts for "short term gains" would hurt Dakota claims that go back to 1870.

The original Canadian land claim alleges that the Dakota are American refugees and, as such, are not entitled their aboriginal rights, land compensation, funding, and recognition as Canadian aboriginal people under s. 35 of the Constitution Act, 1982. The Canadian government alleges that the Dakota live in Manitoba on the good graces of the Crown. The Dakota, excluding Birdtail, intended to use maps and papers that predate confederation in Canada to negotiate a modern treaty.

Chief Chalmers justified his decisions by saying, "The only way I can get things like the renovations going ... I can only get it by partnering, not fighting." Chief Frank Brown of the Canupawakpa Dakota First Nation replied that "Divide and conquer is a game Indian Affairs plays all of the time... When you challenge Canada in court or when you challenge your rights, they take one of your people and give them money to convince them otherwise. The job creation is a good thing, but it's not fixing nothing, it's just a little Band-Aid, whereas we're working for the future of our people."

At the end of March 2013, the people of Birdtail Sioux decided to break with Chief Chalmers, who was defeated by former Chief Kelly Bunn. In March 2015, however, Ken Chalmers was reelected. In March 2017, the Birdtail Sioux First Nation adopted the First Nations Election Act of Canada which gave them the option of a two- or four-year term for Chief and Council. Chalmers was re-elected as chief again until March 2021.

Chalmers lost the election in 2021 to Chief Lindsay "Oscar" Bunn Jr, who served as Chief until 2025. In 2025, Tréchelle Bunn was elected chief. She is the first female chief in this nation and is the youngest chief in Manitoba.
