= Berens River, Manitoba =

Berens River
- Unincorporated community

- Location within Manitoba
- Coordinates: 52°21′55″N 97°01′45″W
- Country: Canada
- Province: Manitoba
- Census division: Division No. 19
- Census subdivision: Unorg. Div. No. 19

Area
  - Land: 5.12 km^{2} (1.98 sq mi)

Population (2020)
  - Total: 71
  - Density: 13.9/km^{2} (36/sq mi)
- Time zone: UTC-6 (CST)
  - Summer (DST): UTC-5 (CDT)
- Area codes: 204, 431, and 584

Berens River is a community in Manitoba, Canada, along the eastern shore of Lake Winnipeg, at the mouth of the Berens River, which flows west from the Ontario headwaters. Together with the adjacent Berens River 13 reserve, it forms one a population centre collectively called Berens River. Both are served by the Berens River Airport.

Prior to 2017, the community was accessible only by winter road, boat, or airplane. Road construction of an all-weather road from Bloodvein, connecting Berens River to the provincial road system, was completed in December 2017, linking the two communities to Provincial Road 304.

The First Nation and fur trade community there was officially started in the 19th century, but the spot was a traditional hunting and fishing area for thousands of years.

== History ==
The first Hudson's Bay Company (HBC) fur-trade post at the mouth of the Berens River was established in the winter of 1814, which was named after Joseph Berens, HBC governor from 1812 to 1822 (it was also spelled as Beren's River and Berings River). This post lasted only 2 years. It was reestablished as an outpost of the HBC post at the Pigeon River in 1821. In the fall of 1824, it became a full post again.

In 1842, a new warehouse was built and the post served as a transshipment point and to protect the trade at Little Grand Rapids, located about 140 kilometres (90 mi) upstream of the Berens River.

In the 1930s, the Berens River Post operated an outpost at Poplar River. In 1959, the post became part of the HBC Northern Stores Department. HBC divested this department in 1987 to The North West Company, which still operates a Northern Store in Berens River First Nation.

== Demographics ==
In the 2021 Census of Population conducted by Statistics Canada, Berens River had a population of 71 living in 21 of its 47 total private dwellings, a change of −47.4% from its 2016 population of 135. With a land area of 5.12 km^{2} (1.98 sq mi), it had a population density of 13.9/km^{2} (35.9/sq mi) in 2021.

According to the 2011 Canada Census, the bordering Berens River 13 reserve of the Berens River First Nation had a population of 1,028.

Historical census populations – Berens River, Manitoba
Year	Pop.	±%
2006	153	—
2011	111	−27.5%
2016	135	+21.6%
2021	71	−47.4%
Population figures based on revised counts. Source: Statistics Canada

== Climate ==
Berens River experiences a humid continental climate (Dfb). The highest temperature ever recorded in Berens River was 40.0 °C (104 °F) on 11 July 1936. The coldest temperature ever recorded was −47.2 °C (−53 °F) on 28 December 1933.

Climate data for Berens River, 1981−2010 normals, extremes 1905−present
Month	Jan	Feb	Mar	Apr	May	Jun	Jul	Aug	Sep	Oct	Nov	Dec	Year
Record high °C (°F)	7.1 (44.8)	10.0 (50.0)	21.9 (71.4)	28.9 (84.0)	32.2 (90.0)	39.4 (102.9)	40.0 (104.0)	35.6 (96.1)	32.2 (90.0)	28.3 (82.9)	20.6 (69.1)	8.3 (46.9)	40.0 (104.0)
Mean daily maximum °C (°F)	−13.8 (7.2)	−10.4 (13.3)	−3.1 (26.4)	7.0 (44.6)	14.8 (58.6)	20.8 (69.4)	23.3 (73.9)	22.1 (71.8)	15.8 (60.4)	7.4 (45.3)	−2.5 (27.5)	−10.3 (13.5)	5.9 (42.6)
Daily mean °C (°F)	−18.9 (−2.0)	−16.2 (2.8)	−9.2 (15.4)	1.1 (34.0)	8.6 (47.5)	14.9 (58.8)	17.7 (63.9)	16.5 (61.7)	10.6 (51.1)	3.2 (37.8)	−6.5 (20.3)	−15.0 (5.0)	0.6 (33.1)
Mean daily minimum °C (°F)	−23.9 (−11.0)	−22.0 (−7.6)	−15.3 (4.5)	−4.8 (23.4)	2.5 (36.5)	8.9 (48.0)	12.1 (53.8)	10.8 (51.4)	5.5 (41.9)	−1.0 (30.2)	−10.4 (13.3)	−19.7 (−3.5)	−4.8 (23.4)
Record low °C (°F)	−46.7 (−52.1)	−45.0 (−49.0)	−42.9 (−45.2)	−34.4 (−29.9)	−17.8 (0.0)	−6.1 (21.0)	−2.8 (27.0)	−2.8 (27.0)	−9.4 (15.1)	−18.9 (−2.0)	−36.8 (−34.2)	−47.2 (−53.0)	−47.2 (−53.0)
Average precipitation mm (inches)	17.9 (0.70)	12.3 (0.48)	23.7 (0.93)	23.4 (0.92)	45.8 (1.80)	60.4 (2.38)	52.2 (2.06)	72.2 (2.84)	63.4 (2.50)	47.3 (1.86)	31.2 (1.23)	19.9 (0.78)	469.8 (18.50)
Average rainfall mm (inches)	0.1 (0.00)	0.9 (0.04)	7.8 (0.31)	17.0 (0.67)	43.7 (1.72)	60.4 (2.38)	52.2 (2.06)	72.2 (2.84)	63.2 (2.49)	35.4 (1.39)	8.2 (0.32)	0.3 (0.01)	361.3 (14.22)
Average snowfall cm (inches)	20.7 (8.1)	13.3 (5.2)	17.6 (6.9)	6.7 (2.6)	2.2 (0.9)	0.0 (0.0)	0.0 (0.0)	0.0 (0.0)	0.3 (0.1)	13.0 (5.1)	26.7 (10.5)	22.7 (8.9)	123.1 (48.5)
Average precipitation days (≥ 0.2 mm)	10.3	9.3	9.1	11.2	11.5	11.2	9.7	8.6	5.9	7.3	12.6	12.1	118.8
Mean monthly sunshine hours	89.8	123.2	173.2	222.0	274.9	277.9	257.5	269.7	161.1	107.5	60.3	69.0	2,086.1
Percentage possible sunshine	35.0	44.2	47.2	53.3	56.5	55.5	51.1	59.2	42.2	32.5	22.8	28.6	44.0
Source: Environment Canada
