= Sioux Valley Dakota Nation =

Dakota people of the Sioux residing west of Brandon, Manitoba

Coordinates: 49°51′00″N 100°29′58″W

Sioux Valley Dakota Nation Wipazoka Wakpa
- People: Dakota
- Headquarters: Griswold, Manitoba R0M 0S0

Government
- Chief: Vincent Tacan

Tribal Council
- Dakota Ojibway Tribal Council

Website
- svdngovernance.com

Location of the Sioux Valley Dakota Nation Reserve in Manitoba

Sioux Valley Dakota Nation (SVDN) or Wipazoka Wakpa ('Saskatoon River', named for the abundance of Saskatoon bushes along the river) is a Dakota (Sioux) First Nation that resides west of Brandon, Manitoba.

The Sioux Valley Dakota Nation has a total population of around 2,400. Around 1,080 of the population resides on the Sioux Valley Dakota Nation Reserve, which is located by the southeast corner of the Rural Municipality of Wallace - Woodworth.

Sioux Valley Dakota Nation comprises the Eastern Dakota bands of the Seven Council Fires. The Sisituŋwaŋ, Waȟpetuŋwaŋ, Bdewakaŋtuŋwaŋ, and Waȟpe Kute.

== Reserves ==
The First Nation have two reserves, their main reserve and one in which they share.

- Sioux Valley Dakota Nation — 38.2 km^{2} (9,400 acres)
- Fishing Station 62A — shared reserve with Birdtail Sioux and Canupawakpa Dakota First Nations
