= Tootinaowaziibeeng First Nation =

Coordinates: 51.227°N 101.220°W

The Tootinaowaziibeeng First Nation is an Anishinabe band in Manitoba. They are located on reserve land at IR Valley River 63A. They number about 600 with a similar number located in various locations away from the reserve. The location of their land is east of Roblin and west of Grandview. The band members are associated with the West Region Tribal Council.
