= Berens River =

- Location of the mouth of the Berens River in Manitoba

Location
- Country: Canada
- Provinces: Manitoba; Ontario

Physical characteristics
- Source: Unnamed lake
  - location: Kenora District, Ontario
  - coordinates: 51°28′03″N 92°38′18″W
  - elevation: 407 m (1,335 ft)
- Mouth: Lake Winnipeg
  - location: Census Division 19, Northern Region, Manitoba
  - coordinates: 52°21′25″N 97°03′04″W
  - elevation: 217 m (712 ft)

Basin features
- River system: Nelson River drainage basin
- Tributaries
  - right: Whitefish River

The Berens River is a river in the provinces of Manitoba and Ontario, Canada. It flows west from an unnamed lake in Kenora District, Ontario, and discharges its waters into Lake Winnipeg near the community and First Nation of Berens River, Manitoba. The river has a number of lakes along its course, and many rapids.

== History ==
The river has been a First Nations traditional hunting and fishing area for thousands of years. It was first travelled by European explorers in 1767, who descended the river to Lake Winnipeg after having crossed over from the Severn River. The river was named for Joseph Berens, then governor or the Hudson's Bay Company (HBC).

Several HBC posts and one of the Northwest Company were established at the mouth, upriver, and even at the mouth of the Pigeon River further south, the first in 1814. The river system became an HBC trade route between the Berens River Post at Lake Winnipeg and Little Grand Rapids (about 140 kilometres (90 mi) upstream) and even further inland.

== Natural history ==
Berens River is one of the last remaining fresh water rivers in southern Canada with very little development, no major roads, and with woodland caribou habitat.

== Transportation ==
The river can be crossed over an all-weather permanent bridge in the community of Berens River First Nation in Manitoba.

The Ontario Government announced funding in 2009 for "…design, surveying, environmental assessments and other steps required before construction can begin" for a permanent bridge on the existing winter road between the all-weather road connecting to Ontario Highway 125 to the south and the Deer Lake First Nation, North Spirit Lake First Nation and Sandy Lake First Nation to the north. The bridge would be located on the Berens River east and upstream of Berens Lake.

== Settlements ==
- Berens River, Manitoba
- Little Grand Rapids, Manitoba, on Family Lake about 115 kilometres (71 mi) southeast of the mouth of the river.
- Poplar Hill First Nation, Ontario
- Pikangikum First Nation, Ontario

== Tributaries ==
From the Manitoba border at Lake Winnipeg upstream to the river’s headwaters in Ontario, the Berens River receives the following known tributaries:

- Whitefish River (right)
- Mamakwash River (left)
- Owl Creek (left)
- Windfall Creek (left)
- Throat River (right)
- Dowling River (left)
- Pikangikum Lake (headwaters inflow region)
- Crooked Mouth River (right)
- Keeper River (left)

== See also ==
- List of rivers of Manitoba
- List of rivers of Ontario
