= Little Grand Rapids =

- Unincorporated community

- Location within Manitoba
- Coordinates: 52°02′10″N 95°27′40″W
- Country: Canada
- Province: Manitoba
- Census division: Division No. 19
- Census subdivision: Unorg. Div. No. 19
- Settled: 1801

Area
  - Land: 1.47 km^{2} (0.57 sq mi)

Population (2021)
  - Total: 0
  - Density: 0/km^{2} (0/sq mi)
- Time zone: UTC-6 (CST)
  - Summer (DST): UTC-5 (CDT)
- Area codes: 204, 431, and 584

Little Grand Rapids is a community in east central Manitoba, Canada, near the Ontario border. It is located approximately 280 kilometers or 173 miles north-northeast from Winnipeg, Manitoba.

It is a fly-in community, with only a winter road. Planes fly into Little Grand Rapids Airport. It features a Royal Canadian Mounted Police detachment and a Northern Store.

It is at the mouth of the Berens River on Family Lake, which is part of the Lake Winnipeg watershed.

== Demographics ==
In the 2021 Census of Population conducted by Statistics Canada, Little Grand Rapids had a population of 0 living in 0 of its 0 total private dwellings, a change of −100% from its 2016 population of 15. With a land area of 1.47 km^{2} (0.57 sq mi), it had a population density of 0.0/km^{2} (0.0/sq mi) in 2021.

Historical census populations – Little Grand Rapids
Year	Pop.	±%
2006	5	—
2011	10	+100.0%
2016	15	+50.0%
2021	0	−100.0%
Population figures based on revised counts. Source: Statistics Canada

== History ==
In 1801, the Hudson's Bay Company established a wintering post called Big Fall or Great Fall in the area, reporting to Osnaburgh House. It operated until 1805, and again from at least 1816 to 1821.

In 1865, the outpost was reestablished by William McKay, and was called Grand Rapid, named after the rapids on the Berens River. It was supplied from York Factory until 1871, and then from Winnipeg via Lake Winnipeg and the Berens River. In 1888, it became a full trading post and renamed to Little Grand Rapids in order to distinguish it from Grand Rapids post on the west side of Lake Winnipeg.

In the early 20th century, the outposts at Pikangikum, Deer Lake, and Poplar River were operated from the Little Grand Rapids post. In 1921, the last York boat was used to supply the post from Berens River. In 1941, a lightning fire destroyed all the buildings and the post was rebuilt half a mile to the east.

In 1959, the post became part of the HBC Northern Stores Department, which was divested by HBC in 1987 to The North West Company, which still operates a Northern Store in Little Grand Rapids.
