= Assembly of Manitoba Chiefs =

First Nations association in Canada

- Predecessor: Manitoba Indian Brotherhood
- Formation: 1988
- Headquarters: 137-476 Madison St, Winnipeg, Manitoba R3J 1J1
- Grand Chief: Kyra Wilson
- Main organ: Chiefs-in-Assembly
- Website: manitobachiefs.com

The Assembly of Manitoba Chiefs (AMC; preceded by the Manitoba Indian Brotherhood, MIB) is an association that advocates on issues affecting First Nations in Manitoba. Representing all of the 63 First Nations in the province, it advocates on behalf of over 151,000 First Nation citizens in Manitoba.

The most recent Grand Chief was Cathy Merrick of Cross Lake.

== History ==
Preceding the Assembly of Manitoba Chiefs was the Manitoba Indian Brotherhood (MIB), which was created in the late 1960s as a province-wide body to provide a common voice for First Nations in Manitoba.

The MIB presented their landmark position paper—entitled "Wahbung: Our Tomorrows" —in opposition to then-Prime Minister Pierre Elliott Trudeau's 1969 White Paper which proposed the abolition of the Indian Act. The federal government at the time argued that the Indian Act was discriminatory and that the special legal relationship between Aboriginal peoples and the Canadian state should be dismantled in favour of equality, in accordance with Trudeau's vision of a "just society". The federal government proposed that by eliminating "Indian" as a distinct legal status, the resulting equality among all Canadians would help resolve the problems faced by Indigenous peoples. After opposition from many Indigenous leaders—including the MIB—the white paper was abandoned in 1970. The MIB paper was presented to Trudeau and the Government of Canada in 1971.

The MIB dissolved by the early 1980s due to the difficulties of an increasingly elaborate agenda and emerging regional interests. An "All Chiefs Unity Assembly" eventually convened in 1987 to adopt by consensus a statement of principles of political unity. That year, Louis Stevenson was appointed as the first Provincial Leader for the Assembly of Manitoba Chiefs. In 1988, the Chiefs-in-Assembly formulated a model for province-wide political cooperation among the First Nations, thereby establishing the basic structure and mandate for the Assembly of Manitoba Chiefs and its secretariat.

In 1990, the title of Provincial Leader for the Assembly of Manitoba Chiefs was changed to Grand Chief of the Assembly of Manitoba Chiefs. In September 1994, the AMC adopted its constitution.

=== Leaders ===
Grand Chiefs of the AMC
Term / year elected	Grand Chief (Note: Known as Provincial Leader until 1990.)	Nation
1987–1989	Louis Stevenson	Peguis First Nation
1989–1997	Phil Fontaine	Sagkeeng First Nation
1997–2000	Rod Bushie	Hollow Water First Nation
2000–2005	Dennis White Bird	Rolling River First Nation
2005–2011	Ron Evans	Norway House Cree Nation
2011–2017	Derek Nepinak	Minegoziibe Anishinabe (Pine Creek First Nation)
2017–2022	Arlen Dumas	Mathias Colomb Cree Nation
2022	Eric Redhead, acting	Shamattawa First Nation
2022–2022	Cornell McLean, acting	Lake Manitoba First Nation
2022–2024	Cathy Merrick	Cross Lake First Nation
2024–2025	Betsy Kennedy, acting	War Lake First Nation
2025–present	Kyra Wilson	Long Plain First Nation

== Mandated organizations ==
The mandated organizations of AMC include:

- Manitoba First Nations Education Resource Centre (MFNERC), established in 1998
- Treaty Relations Commission of Manitoba (TRCM), opened in 2005
- First Peoples Economic Growth Fund, established in 2005
- First Peoples Development Inc. (FPDI), established in 2012
- First Nations Health and Social Secretariat of Manitoba, established in 2013
