= Black River First Nation =

Coordinates: 50.826°N 96.323°W

Black River First Nation (sometimes Little Black River First Nation; Ojibwe: Makadewaagamijiwanoonsing) is an Ojibwa First Nation located around O'Hanley, Manitoba, along the O'Hanley and Black Rivers, on the eastern shore of Lake Winnipeg.

It is 32 km (20 mi) north of Pine Falls, and around 150 km (93 mi) north of Winnipeg. Though geographically situated in Eastern Manitoba, it is more so administratively a part of Northern Manitoba. Its reserve is called Black River 5 Indian Reserve, which spans 8.093 km^{2} (2,000 acres) and whose population was 521 as of the 2011 census.

In January 2008, the total registered population of the First Nation was 977, of which the on-reserve population was 701.

The settlement is accessible by an all-weather road (via PR 304) and 4 km of municipal road.

== Governance ==
The First Nation's current chief and council as of 2 August 2017 are Chief Sheldon Kent, Councillors Mildred Cook, Oral Johnston, and Leah Fontaine.

Black River First Nation is a member of Southeast Resource Development Council Corporation.
