= Island Lake Tribal Council =

- Headquarters: Winnipeg; R3C 0T2
- Grand Chief: Scott Harper
- Website: iltc.ca

The Island Lake Tribal Council (ILTC), or Anishininew Okimawin - Island Lake Tribal Council, is a tribal council in northeastern Manitoba, Canada, representing 4 First Nations communities situated along Island and Red Sucker Lakes.

== Members ==
The ILTC represents 4 First Nations communities:

- Garden Hill First Nation — Island Lake
- Red Sucker Lake First Nation — Red Sucker Lake
- St. Theresa Point First Nation — St. Theresa Point
- Wasagamack First Nation — Wasagamack

== Amenities ==
- Island Lake Airport
- Red Sucker Lake Airport
- Red Sucker Lake Water Aerodrome
- St. Theresa Point Airport
