= List of Indian reserves in Canada by population =

This is a list of First Nation reserves in Canada which have over 500 people, listed in order of population from data collected during the 2006 census of Canada, unless otherwise cited from Aboriginal Affairs. Approximately 40% of First Nations people live on federally recognized Indian reserves. Note: this list is incomplete in that many Indian Reserves are "Incompletely enumerated", meaning that "enumeration was not permitted or was interrupted before it could be completed." There are 13 Indian reserves which have not been enumerated in the last 3 censuses.

== List ==
1. Six Nations of the Grand River: 12,757
2. Akwesasne Mohawk Nation: 11,500
3. Blood (Kainai Nation) 148: 8,371
4. Kahnawake Mohawk Territory: 7,989
5. Tsinstikeptum 9, British Columbia: 7,612 (Only 1,085 of Aboriginal identity) – Westbank First Nation
6. Lac La Ronge First Nation: 11,177
7. Saddle Lake Cree Nation: 6,578
8. Norway House Cree Nation:6,197
9. Cross Lake First Nation: 6,076
10. Samson Cree Nation: 5,418
11. Stoney 142, 143, 144, Alberta: 4,956
12. Moose Cree First Nation: 4,500
13. Cree Nation of Chisasibi: 4,410
14. Sandy Bay 5, Manitoba: 4,144
15. Siksika 146, Alberta: 4,102
16. St. Theresa Point, Manitoba: 4,021
17. Garden Hill First Nation: 3,997
18. Eskasoni 3, Nova Scotia: 3,850
19. Innu Takuaikan Uashat Mak Mani-Utenam: 3,530
20. Elsipogtog First Nation: 3,600
21. Ermineskin 138, Alberta: 3,290 (as of 2019)
22. Tyendinaga Mohawk Territory: 2,524
23. Peguis 1B, Manitoba: 2,513
24. Capilano 5, British Columbia: 2,495
25. One Arrow 95, Saskatchewan: 1,935 (around)
26. Listuguj, Quebec: 2,400 (around)
27. Wikwemikong Unceded, Ontario: 2,386
28. Betsiamites, Quebec: 2,357
29. Okanagan 1, British Columbia (part): 2,192 – Okanagan Indian Band, Okanagan people, Vernon
30. Opaskwayak Cree Nation 21E, Manitoba: 2,187
31. Sagkeeng First Nation 3, Manitoba: 2,121
32. Pikangikum 14, Ontario: 2,100
33. Nelson House 170, Manitoba: 2,096
34. Oxford House 24, Manitoba: 1,947
35. Duck Lake 7, British Columbia: 1,925 (1,850 non-Aboriginal identity, 75 Aboriginal identity), – Okanagan Indian Band, Okanagan people, Lake Country
36. Walpole Island 46, Ontario: 1,878
37. Manawan, Quebec: 1,843
38. Sandy Lake 88, Ontario: 1,843
39. Split Lake 17, Manitoba (part): 1,819
40. Fort Albany 67, Ontario (part): 1,805
41. Kamloops 1, British Columbia: 1,785 (990 non-Aboriginal identity, 795 Aboriginal identity) – Kamloops Indian Band, Secwepemc people, Kamloops
42. Obedjiwan, Quebec: 1,782
43. Cowichan 1, British Columbia: 1,805 (50 non-Aboriginal identity, 1750 Aboriginal identity) – Cowichan Tribes, Coast Salish, Duncan
44. Fox Lake 162, Alberta: 1,753
45. Seekaskootch 119, Saskatchewan: 1,752
46. Mashteuiatsh, Quebec: 1,749
47. Cross Lake 19A, Manitoba: 1,663
48. New Songhees 1A, British Columbia: 1,643 – Songhees First Nation, Coast Salish, Esquimalt
49. East Saanich 2, British Columbia: 1,637
50. Fisher River Cree Nation 44,44A, Manitoba: 1,600
51. Cross Lake 19, Manitoba: 1,586
52. Lac la Ronge 156, Saskatchewan: 1,534
53. Pukatawagan 198, Manitoba: 1,478
54. Penticton 1, British Columbia: 1,470 (995 non-Aboriginal identity, 475 Aboriginal identity) – Penticton Indian Band, Okanagan people, Penticton
55. Stanley 157, Saskatchewan: 1,467
56. Big River 118, Saskatchewan: 1,437
57. Stony Plain 135, Alberta: 1,418
58. Nipissing 10, Ontario: 1,413
59. Burrard Inlet 3, British Columbia: 1,405 (Tsleil-Waututh First Nation, Coast Salish, District of North Vancouver
60. Musqueam 2, British Columbia: 1,370 (760 non-Aboriginal identity, 605 Aboriginal identity) Musqueam Nation, Coast Salish Vancouver
61. Pelican Narrows 184B, Saskatchewan: 1,342
62. Piikani 147, Alberta: 1,300
63. White Fish Lake 128, Alberta: 1,237
64. Kwakwaka'wakw Alert Bay B.C: 3,666
65. Ebb and Flow 52, Manitoba: 1,189
66. Tzeachten 13, British Columbia: 1,165 (895 non-Aboriginal identity, 275 Aboriginal identity) – Sto:lo Nation, Sto:lo people, Sardis (Chilliwack)
67. Louis Bull 138B, Alberta: 1,180
68. Lac-Simon, Quebec: 1,165
69. Kitigan Zibi, Quebec: 1,165
70. Beardy's 97 and Okemasis 96, Saskatchewan: 1,161
71. Wasagamack, Manitoba: 1,160
72. Fort Hope 64, Ontario: 1,144
73. Waywayseecappo First Nation, Manitoba: 1,127
74. Esgenoôpetitj 14 (formerly Burnt Church 14): 1,120
75. Sturgeon Lake 101, Saskatchewan: 1,116
76. Chicken 224, Saskatchewan: 1,109
77. God's Lake 23, Manitoba: 1,105
78. Ahtahkakoop 104, Saskatchewan: 1,101
79. Wabamun 133A, Alberta: 1,088
80. Sioux Valley Dakota Nation, Manitoba: 1,079
81. Wemotaci, Quebec: 1,073
82. Bella Bella 1, British Columbia: 2,506 – Heiltsuk Nation, Heiltsuk people, Bella Bella
83. Curve Lake First Nation 35, Ontario: 1,060
84. Sturgeon Lake 154, Alberta: 1,051
85. Tsinstikeptum 10, British Columbia: 1,040 (945 non-Aboriginal identity, 105 Aboriginal identity) – Westbank First Nation, Okanagan people, West Kelowna)(According to the Westbank First Nation, approximately 6,000 non-band members and 500 First Nation Westbank band members live on the two Tsinstikeptum reserves.)
86. John D'Or Prairie 215, Alberta: 1,025
87. Kettle Point 44, Ontario: 1,020
88. Indian Brook 14, Nova Scotia: 1,014
89. Kehewin 123, Alberta: 1,007
90. Garden River 14, Ontario: 985
91. Chemawawin 2, Manitoba: 983
92. Mistawasis 103, Saskatchewan: 968
93. Alexander 134, Alberta: 962
94. Lac La Hache 220, Saskatchewan: 953
95. Hay Lake 209, Alberta: 951
96. La Romaine, Quebec: 926
97. Shamattawa 1, Manitoba: 920
98. Kitchenuhmaykoosib Aaki 84, Ontario: 916
99. Southend 200, Saskatchewan: 910
100. Fort William 52, Ontario: 909
101. Fairford 50, Manitoba (part): 904
102. Sagamok, Ontario: 884
103. Montreal Lake 106, Saskatchewan: 880
104. Tobique 20, New Brunswick: 878
105. Gordon 86, Saskatchewan: 866
106. Wabasca 166D, Alberta: 863
107. Mnjikaning First Nation 32, Ontario: 846
108. Red Sucker Lake, 1976, Manitoba: 845
109. Canoe Lake 165, Saskatchewan: 822
110. Lac Seul 28, Ontario: 821
111. Kimosom Pwatinahk 203, Saskatchewan: 821
112. Thunderchild First Nation 115B, Saskatchewan: 819
113. Chitek Lake 191, Saskatchewan: 818
114. Natashquan, Quebec: 810
115. Fond du Lac 227, Saskatchewan: 801
116. Makwa Lake 129B, Saskatchewan: 800
117. Mount Currie 6, British Columbia: 799Mount Currie Indian Band, St'at'imc/Lilwat people, Mount Currie
118. Little Grand Rapids 14, Manitoba: 796
119. White Bear 70, Saskatchewan: 796
120. Bella Coola 1, British Columbia: 788 – Nuxalk Nation, Nuxalk people, Bella Coola
121. Wabaseemoong, Ontario: 786
122. Utikoomak Lake 155, Alberta: 786
123. Skidegate 1, British Columbia: 781 – Skidegate First Nation/Council of the Haida Nation, Haida people, Skidegate
124. Devon 30, New Brunswick: 767
125. M'Chigeeng 22, Ontario: 766
126. Saugeen 29, Ontario: 758
127. Long Plain 6, Manitoba (part): 752
128. Unipouheos 121, Alberta: 749
129. Chippewas of the Thames First Nation 42, Ontario: 747
130. Buffalo River Dene Nation 193, Ontario: 741
131. Berens River 13, Manitoba: 739
132. Alexis 133, Alberta: 734
133. Waterhen 130, Saskatchewan: 727
134. Membertou 28B, Nova Scotia: 726
135. Gitanmaax 1, British Columbia: 723 – Gitxsan Nation, Old Hazelton
136. Gitsegukla 1, British Columbia: 721 – Gitxsan Nation, Gitseguecla
137. Drift Pile River 150, Alberta: 720
138. James Smith 100, Saskatchewan: 708
139. Natuashish 2, Newfoundland and Labrador: 706
140. Sarnia 45, Ontario: 706
141. Millbrook 27, Nova Scotia: 703
142. Constance Lake 92, Ontario: 702
143. Weagamow Lake 87, Ontario: 700
144. Moose Lake 31A, Manitoba: 698
145. Masset 1, British Columbia: 694
146. Couchiching 16A, Ontario: 691
147. Poorman 88, Saskatchewan: 688
148. Chemainus 13, British Columbia: 684
149. Sliammon 1, British Columbia: 682
150. Kasabonika Lake, Ontario: 681
151. Deer Lake, Ontario: 681
152. Lax Kw'alaams 1, British Columbia: 679 – Tsimshian, Port Simpson
153. Tsawwassen Indian Reserve, British Columbia: 675 (475 non-Aboriginal identity, 200 Aboriginal identity) – Tsawaassen First Nation, Coast Salish people, Tsawwassen (Delta)
154. Assiniboine 76, Saskatchewan: 671
155. Kitsakie 156B, Saskatchewan: 671
156. Marktosis 15, British Columbia: 661 – Tla-o-qui-aht First Nations, Nuu-chah-nulth people, Marktosis (in Clayoquot Sound, NW of Tofino)
157. Clearwater River Dene 222, Saskatchewan: 658
158. Red Pheasant 108, Saskatchewan: 656
159. Priest's Valley 6, British Columbia: 655 (555 non-Aboriginal identity, 105 Aboriginal identity) – Okanagan Indian Band, Okanagan people, Vernon
160. Grand Rapids 33, Manitoba: 651
161. Wabasca 166A, Alberta: 648
162. Poplar River 16, Manitoba: 643
163. Montana 139, Alberta: 635
164. English River 21, Ontario: 633
165. Whycocomagh 2, Nova Scotia: 623
166. Whitefish Bay 32A, Ontario: 622
167. Hole or Hollow Water 10, Ontario: 619
168. Flying Dust First Nation 105, Saskatchewan: 619
169. Dog Creek 46, Manitoba: 617
170. Kispiox 1, British Columbia: 617
171. Webequie, Ontario: 614
172. Pine Creek 66A, Manitoba: 614
173. Woyenne 27, British Columbia: 614 – Lake Babine Nation, Dakelh people, Burns Lake
174. Cote 64, Saskatchewan: 607
175. Cross Lake 19E, Manitoba: 605
176. Lac Brochet 197A, Manitoba: 604
177. Shoal River Indian Reserve 65A, Manitoba: 603
178. Osoyoos 1, British Columbia: 600 (255 non-Aboriginal identity, 345 Aboriginal identity) – Osoyoos Indian Band, Okanagan people, Osoyoos
179. Cumberland House Cree Nation 20, Saskatchewan: 595
180. Sucker Creek 150A, Alberta: 594
181. Neyaashiinigmiing 27, Ontario: 591
182. Carrot River 29A, Saskatchewan: 590
183. Christian Island 30, Ontario: 584
184. Little Pine 116, Saskatchewan: 577
185. Bloodvein 12, Manitoba: 576
186. South Saanich 1, British Columbia: 571
187. Mission 1, British Columbia: 569 – Esla7an/Squamish Nation, Squamish people, North Vancouver
188. Roseau River 2, Manitoba: 568
189. Rankin Location 15D, Ontario: 566
190. Chehalis 5, British Columbia: 560 – Chehalis First Nation, Sto:lo people, Chehalis
191. God's River 86A, Manitoba: 556
192. Muskoday First Nation, Saskatchewan: 553
193. Seabird Island, British Columbia: 548 – Seabird First Nation, Sto:lo people, Sea Bird Island (near Agassiz)
194. Shoal Lake 28A, Saskatchewan: 545
195. Ministikwan 161, Saskatchewan: 533
196. Matimekosh, Quebec: 528
197. Wapachewunak 192D, Saskatchewan: 526
198. Anahim's Flat 1, British Columbia: 526
199. Kitamaat 2, British Columbia: 514 – Haisla Nation, Haisla people, Kitimat
200. Cowessess 73, Saskatchewan: 4295 846 on-reserve & 3449 off-reserve
201. Alderville First Nation, Ontario: 506
202. Kahkewistahaw 72, Saskatchewan: 506
203. Timiskaming First Nation: 505
204. The Narrows 49, Manitoba: 505
205. Eel Ground 2, New Brunswick: 503
206. Keeseekoose 66, Saskatchewan: 500
207. Stoney Point Aazhoodena: #43

== 2001 Census ==
- Tsuu T'ina Nation 145, Alberta: 1,982
- Wendake, Quebec: 1,555
- Factory Island 1, Ontario: 1,430
- Attawapiskat 91A, Ontario: 1,293

== See also ==
- List of Indian reserves in Canada
- List of First Nations peoples
- List of First Nations governments
- List of place names in Canada of Aboriginal origin
- Classification of indigenous peoples of the Americas
