= Garden Hill First Nation =

First Nation in Manitoba, Canada

Garden Hill
- Indian reserve
- Garden Hill First Nation
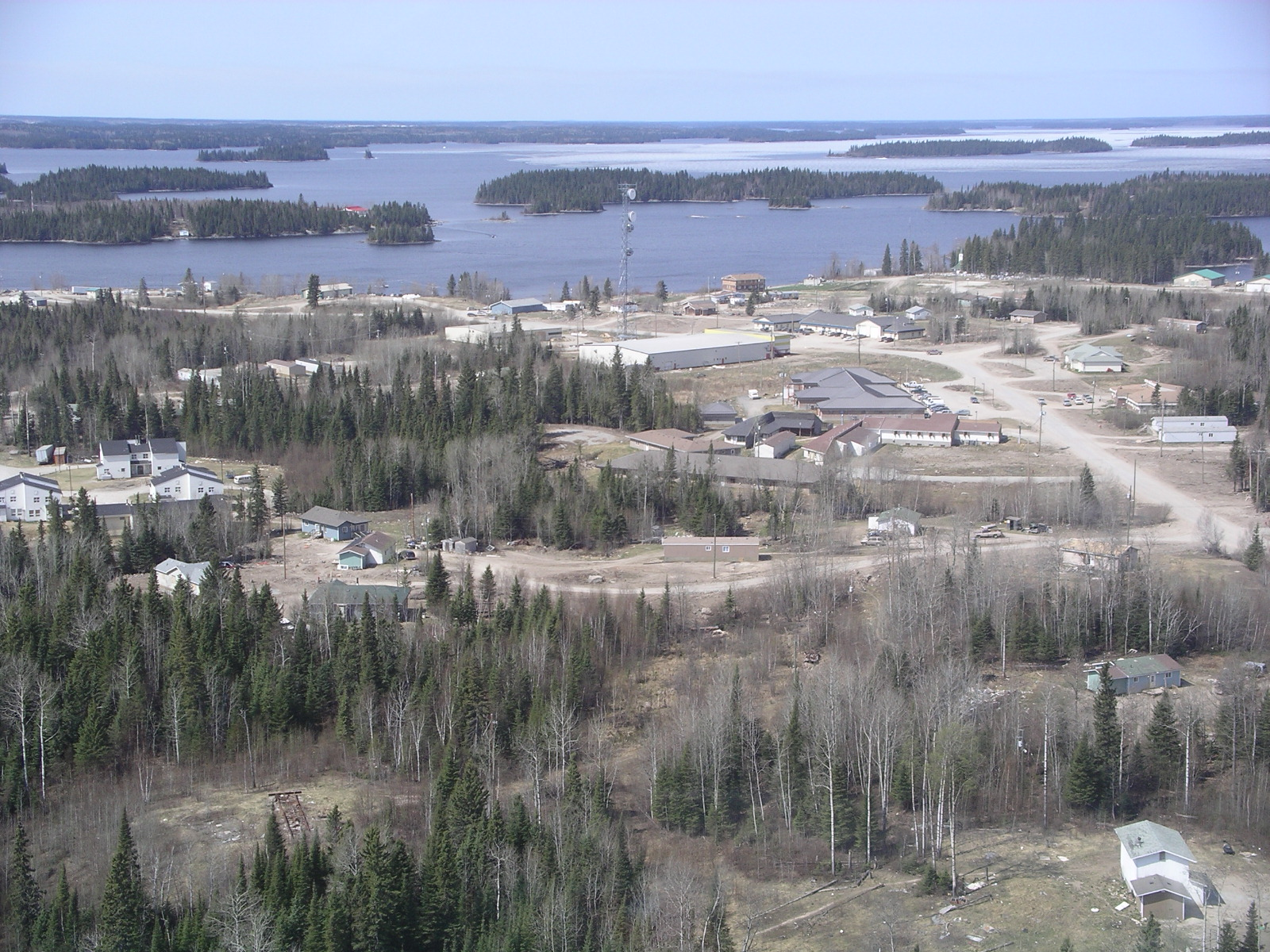
- View of the community

- Map showing Garden Hill in Manitoba
- Coordinates: 53°52′17″N 94°38′27″W
- Country: Canada
- Province: Manitoba
- Region: Island Lake (Northern Manitoba)

Area (2019)
  - Land: 73.573 km^{2} (28.407 sq mi)

Population
  - Total: 3,054
- Languages: Oji-Cree and English

Garden Hill is the second largest of three reserves of the Island Lake region of Manitoba.

Garden Hill First Nations (Oji-Cree: ᑭᐢᑎᑲᐣᐘᒋᐣᐠ, Kistiganwacheeng), the reserve's First Nations community, is located in the northeast section of the Canadian province of Manitoba on the shore of Island Lake.

Garden Hill had a population of 3,054 in the 2021 Canadian census. The residents of Garden Hill speak Oji-Cree and English. It is only accessible by winter ice roads via St. Theresa Point and by air. Nearby on Island Lake are the communities of Wasagamack of the Wasagamack First Nation, St. Theresa Point of the St. Theresa Point First Nation, and the northern settlement of Island Lake.

== History ==
In the early 1900s, there were no chiefs, but there were leaders called "headmen". They earned their status by establishing a reputation for generosity, service, wisdom, spirituality, courage, diplomacy, dignity, loyalty and personal magnetism. These leaders achieved status by influence, not by possession of wealth, but by the distribution of it. The shared generosity because of beliefs, values, traditions, and customs required by this behaviour. The chief with the longest time in the position was Henry Fiddler, who held the position of Chief for 22 years from 1931 to 1953.

Garden Hill First Nations once belonged to the Island Lake band, who, on 13 August 1909, became a signatory of Treaty 5. In 1969, Island Lake split into four separate communities with their own separate administrations: Wasagamack, Red Sucker Lake, St. Theresa Point, and Garden Hill First Nations. Today, the four communities have a tribal council, called Island Lake Tribal Council, to collaborate on common interests.

== Demographics ==
The population of Garden Hill was 3,054 in the 2021 Canadian census an increase of 17.3% from 2016. There were a total of 665 private dwellings. The population density was 36.8 per square kilometre on a land area of 83.05 square kilometres. The median age was 21.4.

== Garden Hill First Nations ==
Garden Hill First Nations
- Band No. 297
- Treaty: Treaty 5
- Headquarters: Island Lake, Manitoba

Land
- Main reserve: Garden Hill First Nation

Population (2021)
- On reserve: 3972
- On other land: 71
- Off reserve: 748
- Total population: 4791

Government
- Chief: Dino Flett

Tribal Council
- Island Lake Tribal Council

Garden Hill First Nations is a First Nations community, and a signatory of Treaty 5. As of February 2015, Garden Hill First Nations had a registered population of 4,567 with 3918 members living on reserve and 649 members living off reserve. Members elect a chief, vice chief and seven councillors through a Custom Electoral System.

=== Reserve lands ===
Garden Hill First Nations has the following seven reserves:

Reserve	Location	Coordinates	Total area
Amik Wachink Sakahikan	on Beaver Hill Lake	54.2511°N 94.9696°W	1,339.5 ha (3,310 acres)
Bella Lake Exchange Lands		53.8842°N 94.5528°W	174.80 ha (431.9 acres)
Garden Hill First Nation		53.8714°N 94.6408°W	7,357.30 ha (18,180.3 acres)
Pe-Ta-Waygamak	on the south shore of Island Lake; east of Garden Hill	53.6606°N 94.4283°W	6,092.30 ha (15,054.4 acres)
Seeseep Sakahikan	northeast of Island Lake; 30 km (19 mi) west of Red Sucker Lake	53.9371°N 94.9655°W	1,361.80 ha (3,365.1 acres)
Wesha Kijay Wasagamach	on the northwest shore of Wasakamak Bay on Beaver Hill Lake	54.3776°N 95.0022°W	203.50 ha (502.9 acres)
Wolf River	on the eastern end of Island Lake	53.8678°N 93.9811°W	1,575.10 ha (3,892.2 acres)

== Education ==
There are two schools in Garden Hill. The elementary school is named Kistiganwacheeng Elementary School and the secondary school is called Garden Hill First Nation High School. Garden Hill Student Services office is located in Winnipeg, the office handles post-secondary students that attend various institutions.

== Gallery ==
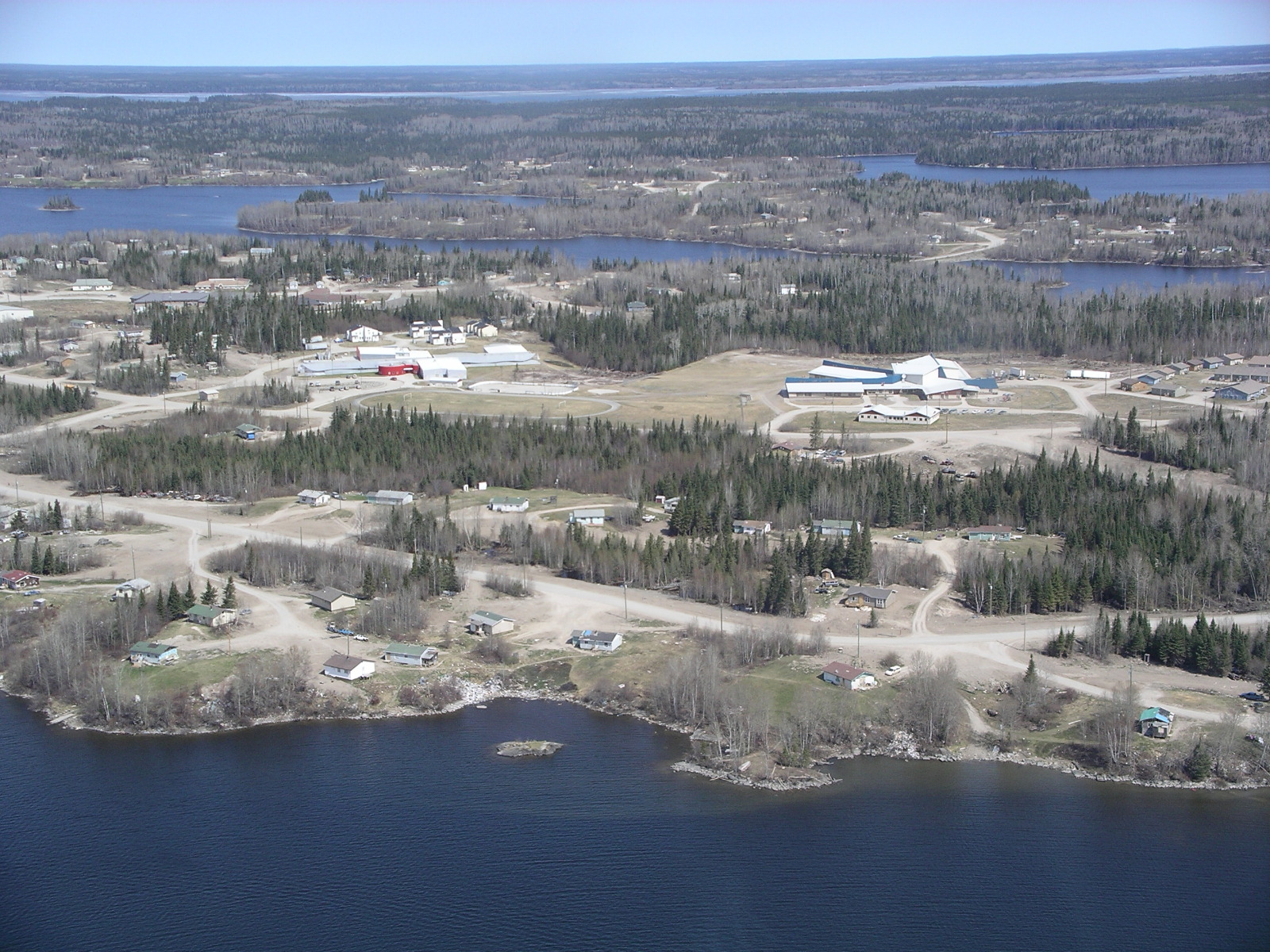
Garden Hill looking north

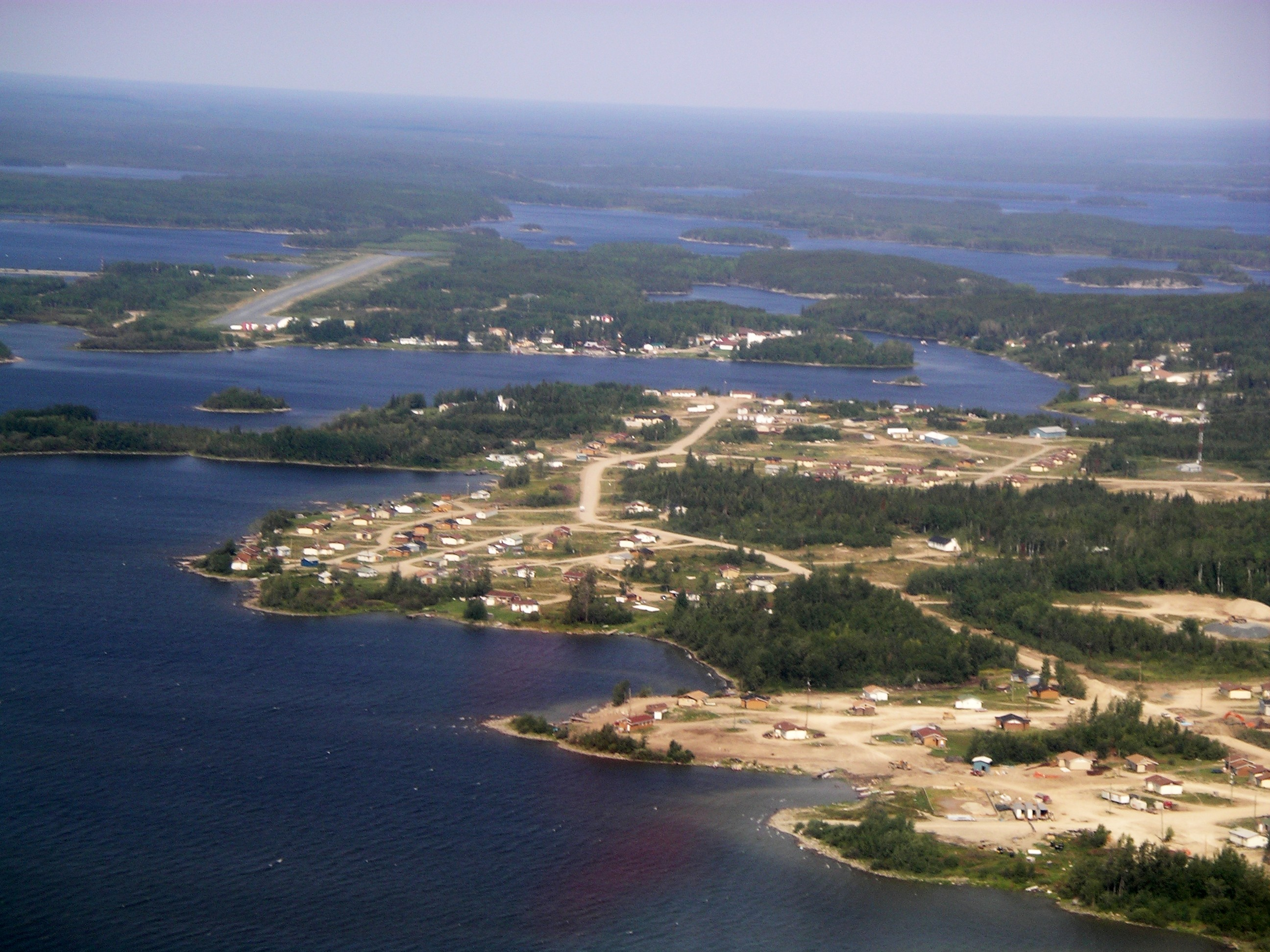
Island Lake/Garden Hill

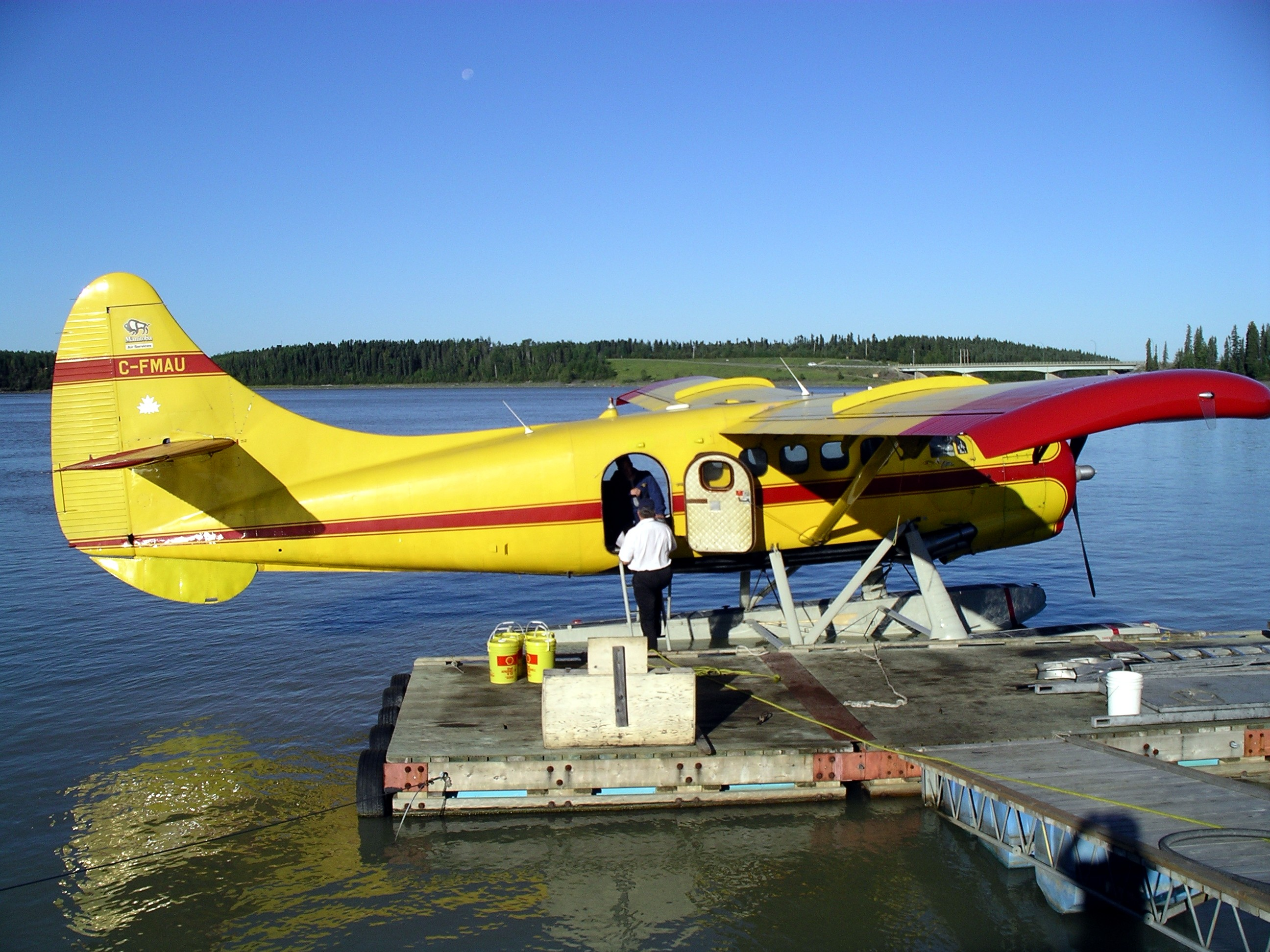
Island Lake Lodge dock

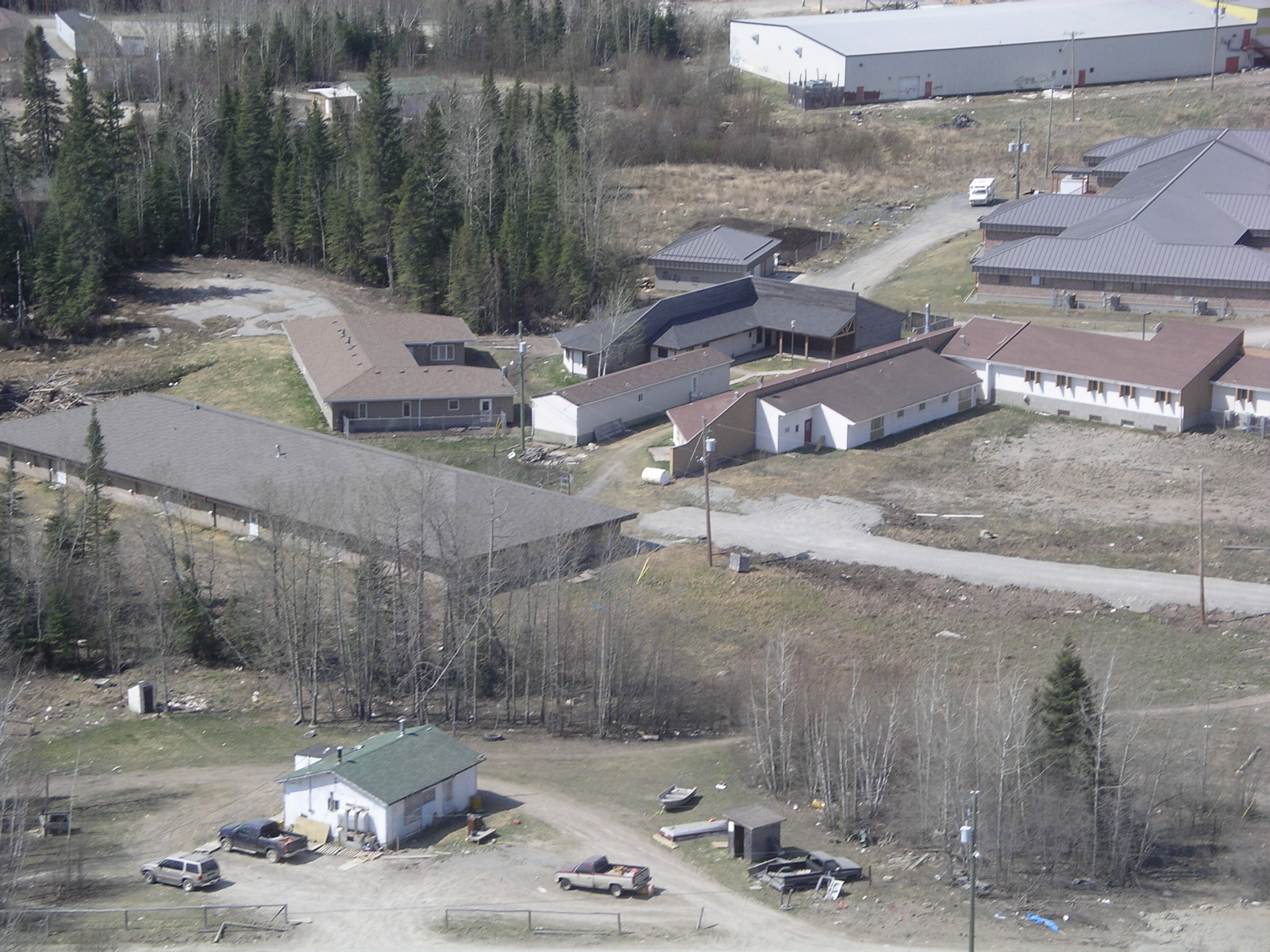
Garden Hill Health Centre
