= Red Sucker Lake First Nation =

Red Sucker Lake Band No. 300
- People: Oji-Cree
- Treaty: Treaty 5
- Headquarters: Red Sucker Lake, Manitoba

Land
- Main reserve: Red Sucker Lake 1976

Government
- Chief: Samuel Knott

Tribal Council
- Island Lake Tribal Council

Red Sucker Lake (Oji-Cree: Mithkwamepin Thaakkahikan, ᒥᐢᑾᒣᐱᐣ ᓴᑲᐦᐃᑲᐣ) is an Oji-Cree First Nation in Manitoba, Canada, located about 706 km (439 mi) northeast of Winnipeg. As of December 2021, the registered population was 1,178 of which 953 lived on their own reserve.

Its main reserve is Red Sucker Lake 1976, which contains the community of Red Sucker Lake, Manitoba.

Historically, the peoples of Red Sucker Lake were part of the Island Lake Band, which also included nearby First Nations of Garden Hill, St. Theresa Point, and Wasagamack. They are a signatory to the 1909 adhesion to Treaty 5.

== History ==
Red Sucker Lake First Nations once belonged to the Island Lake band, who, on 13 August 1909, became a signatory of Treaty 5. In 1969, Island Lake split into four separate communities with their own separate administrations: Garden Hill, Wasagamack, St. Theresa Point First Nations, and Red Sucker Lake. Today, the four communities have a tribal council, called Island Lake Tribal Council, to collaborate on common interests.

== Reserves ==
The First Nation has eight reserves:

Reserve	Coordinates	Total area	Notes
Red Sucker Lake 1976	54°9′39″N 93°34′10″W	252.60 ha (624.2 acres)	Serves as the First Nation's main reserve and contains the community of Red Sucker Lake, Manitoba. It is located 224 km (139 mi) from the city of Thompson
Red Sucker Lake 1976 A	54°9′11″N 93°29′44″W	1,729.90 ha (4,274.7 acres)	
Red Sucker Lake 1976 B	54°6′27″N 93°31′57″W	1,069.30 ha (2,642.3 acres)	
Red Sucker Lake 1976 C	54°12′24″N 93°52′13″W	443.60 ha (1,096.2 acres)	
Red Sucker Lake 1976 D	54°10′20″N 93°47′14″W	57.90 ha (143.1 acres)	
Red Sucker Lake 1976 F	54°5′58″N 93°43′43″W	28.40 ha (70.2 acres)	
Red Sucker Lake 1976 G		10.90 ha (26.9 acres)	
Red Sucker Lake 1976 H		129.90 ha (321.0 acres)	

== Governance ==
The First Nation elect their officials through the Custom Electoral System. Their council consists of a Chief and seven councillors.

The First Nation maintains political affiliations with the Island Lake Tribal Council (ILTC), Manitoba Keewatinohk Okimahkanak (MKO), Assembly of Manitoba Chiefs (AMC), and Indian and Northern Affairs Canada (INAC).

== Notable people ==
- Elijah Harper

== See also ==
- Red Sucker Lake
- Red Sucker Lake Airport
- Red Sucker Lake Water Aerodrome
