= CYRS =

CYRS may refer to:

- Early Cyrillic alphabet (ISO 15924 script code Cyrs)
- Red Sucker Lake Airport, Manitoba, Canada (IATA code CYRS)
