= Wasagamack First Nation =

Wasagamack Anisininew Nation (Oji-cree: ᐗᓴᑲᒪᐣᐠ, meaning: At the Bay) is an Anisininew First Nation band government in Manitoba, Canada. As of December 2014 the registered population of the Wasagamack Anisininew Nation was 2,017, of which 1,823 lived on their own reserve.

Their most populous community is Wasagamack located about 600 km (370 mi) north of Winnipeg on Island Lake. The population of Wasagamack in 2011 was 1,411 an increase of 21.6% from the 2006 population of 1,160. St. Theresa Point First Nation lies just to the south of this reserve.

Historically, the peoples of Wasagamack Anisininew Nation were part of the Island Lake Band of "Cree", which also included the nearby First Nations of Garden Hill, St. Theresa Point and Red Sucker Lake. They are a signatory to the 1909 adhesion to Treaty 5.

== Reserves ==
The Wasagamack Anisininew Nation have reserved for themselves three Indian Reserves:

- 472 hectares (1,170 acres) Feather Rapids Indian Reserve, located on the north shore of Pelican Lake (53°50′30″N 96°5′10″W)
- 414.80 hectares (1,025.0 acres) Naytawunkank Indian Reserve, located on the south shore of Bigstone Lake (53°38′30″N 95°45′15″W)
- 7,446.20 hectares (18,400.0 acres) Wasagamack Indian Reserve, located on the west shore of Island Lake (53°54′30″N 94°56′45″W) and containing their main community of Wasagamack

== Governance ==
The First Nation elects their officials through the Custom Electoral System. Their council consists of a Chief and 6 councillors.

The First Nation maintains political affiliations are with the Island Lake Tribal Council (ILTC), Manitoba Keewatinohk Okimahkanak (MKO), Assembly of Manitoba Chiefs (AMC) and Indian and Northern Affairs Canada (INAC).

== Services ==
Government

The Wasagamack Anisininew Nation administers the following programs:

- aboriginal healing foundation
- airport project
- capital projects
- community outreach program
- economic development
- housing
- justice
- operations and maintenance
- policing
- recreation
- sanitation services
- social assistance
- television and radio broadcasting
- water and sewage services
- youth services

Educational

Educational services are administered by the Wasagamack Education Authority. The education authority oversees the everyday operation of the local school and manages other programs such as adult education program and other post-secondary funding services.

- George Knott School—nursery to grade twelve. There are over 500 students enrolled. There is one main building and several portable classrooms.

Religious

Both Midewiwin and Christianity are observed in the community. There are three church denominations in the community: a Roman Catholic Church, a United Church and a Full Gospel/Pentecostal Church.

== Notable peoples ==
- J.J. Harper, former Chief of Wasagamack.
