= Red Sucker Lake =

Lake in Manitoba, Canada

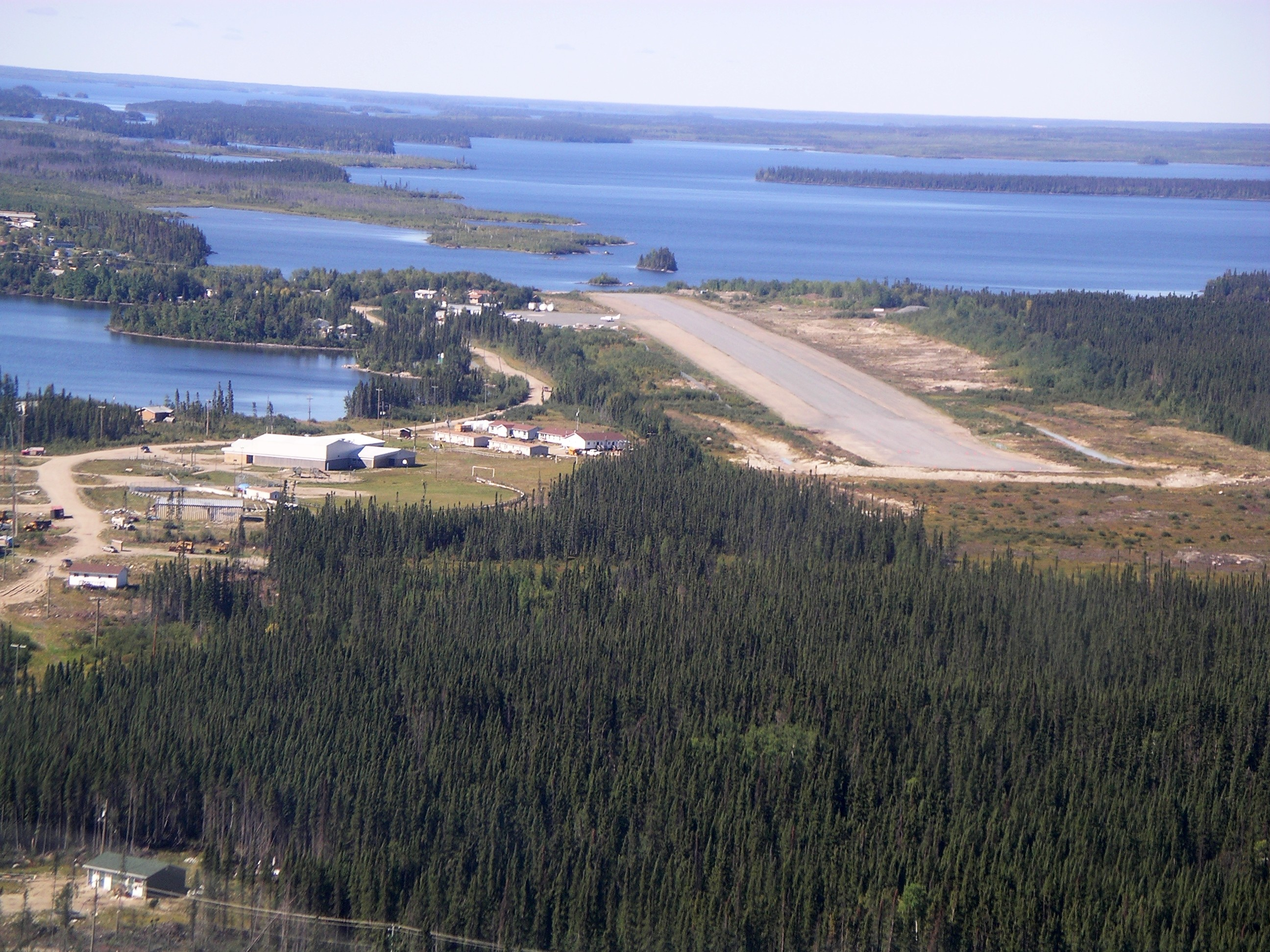
- Red Sucker Lake, with the community of Red Sucker Lake and the Airport in front

- Location of the lake in Manitoba Red Sucker Lake (Canada)
- Location: Manitoba, Canada
- Coordinates: 54°08′32″N 93°40′17″W
- Surface area: 150 km^{2} (58 sq mi)

Red Sucker Lake is a lake in the northeastern part of Manitoba, Canada, near its border with Ontario. It has a surface area of approximately 150 square kilometres (58 sq mi). Adjacent to the lake is the Red Sucker Lake First Nation and the community of Red Sucker Lake, Manitoba.

== See also ==
- List of lakes of Manitoba
