= Island Lake Airport =

Airport in Manitoba, Canada

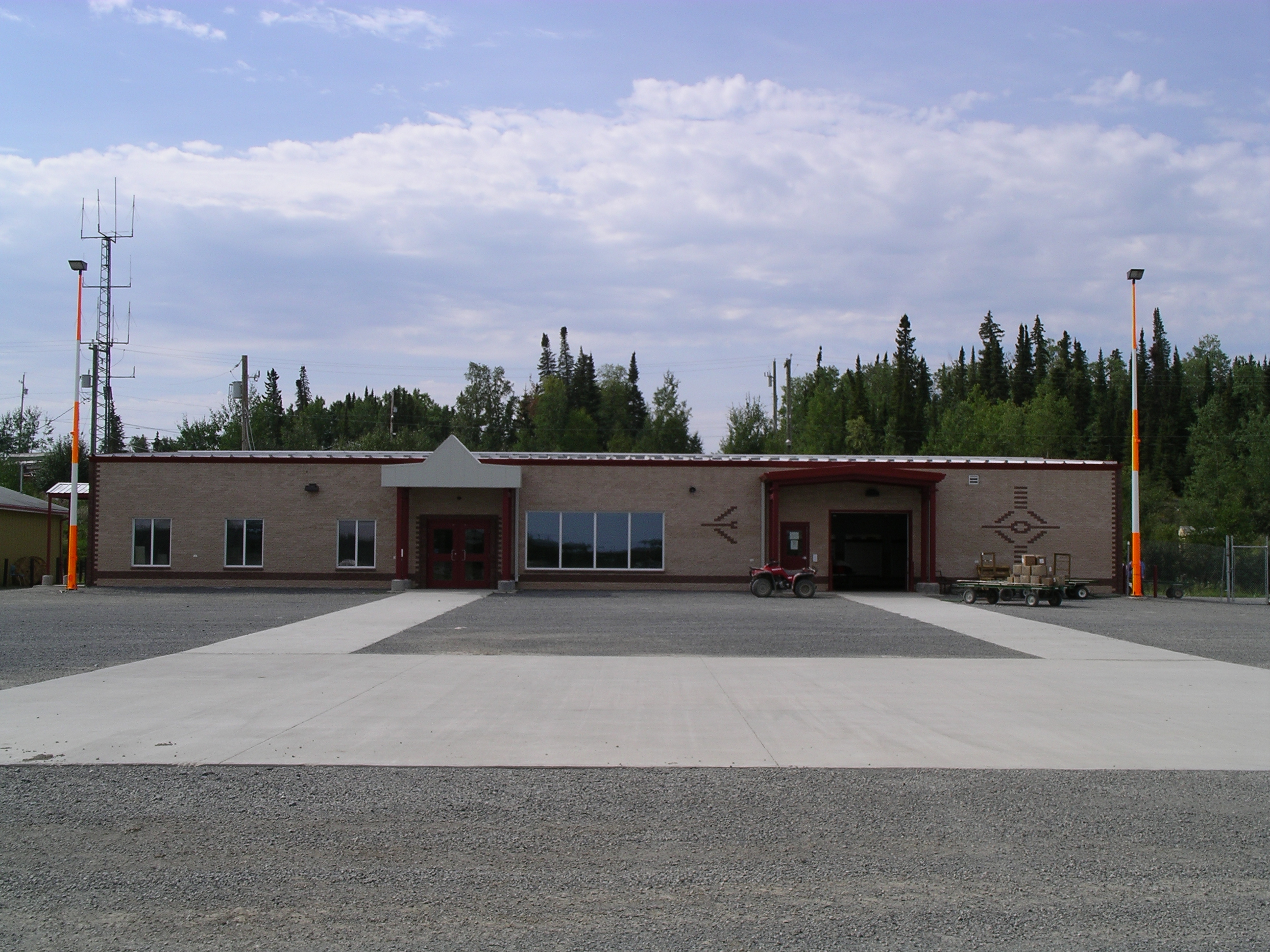
- The terminal building

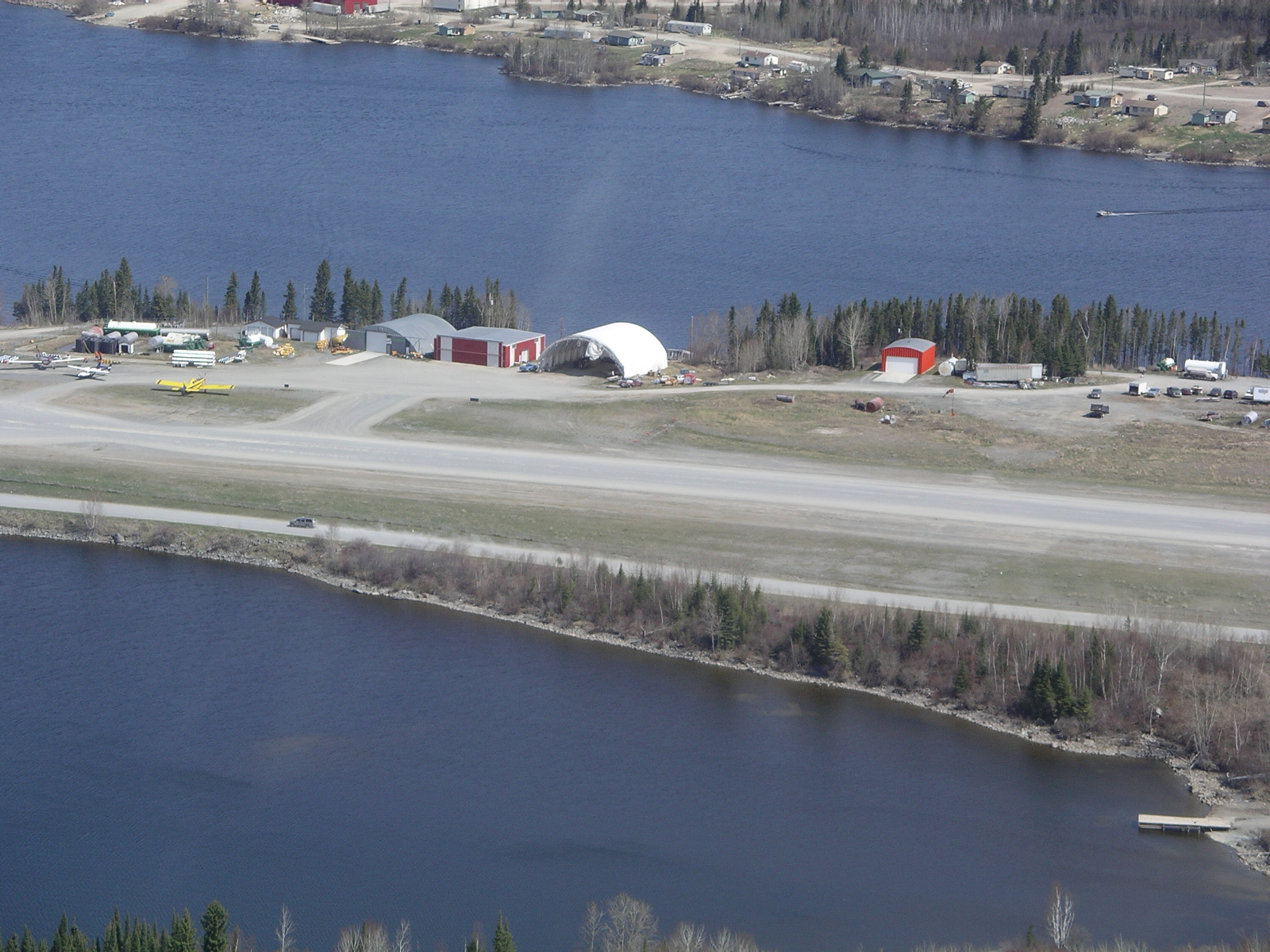
- Hangar area
- IATA: YIV; ICAO: CYIV; WMO: 71145

Summary
- Airport type: Public
- Operator: Government of Manitoba
- Location: Island Lake, Manitoba
- Time zone: CST (UTC−06:00)
  - Summer (DST): CDT (UTC−05:00)
- Elevation AMSL: 772 ft (235 m)
- Coordinates: 53°51′26″N 094°39′13″W

Map
- Location in Manitoba CYIV (Canada)

Runways
Direction	Length		Surface
Direction	ft	m	Surface
12/30	4,000	1,219	Crushed rock

Statistics (2010)
- Aircraft movements: 13,815
- Source: Canada Flight Supplement; Environment Canada; Movements from Statistics Canada

Island Lake Airport or Island Lake — Garden Hill Airport (IATA: YIV, ICAO: CYIV) is located 5 nautical miles (9.3 km; 5.8 mi) southwest of Island Lake, Manitoba, Canada.

== Airlines and destinations ==
Airlines	Destinations
Northway Aviation	Red Sucker Lake, St. Theresa Point, Winnipeg/St. Andrews
Perimeter Aviation	Red Sucker Lake, Winnipeg

== See also ==
- List of airports in Manitoba
