= Island Lake, Manitoba =

Island Lake
- Unincorporated community
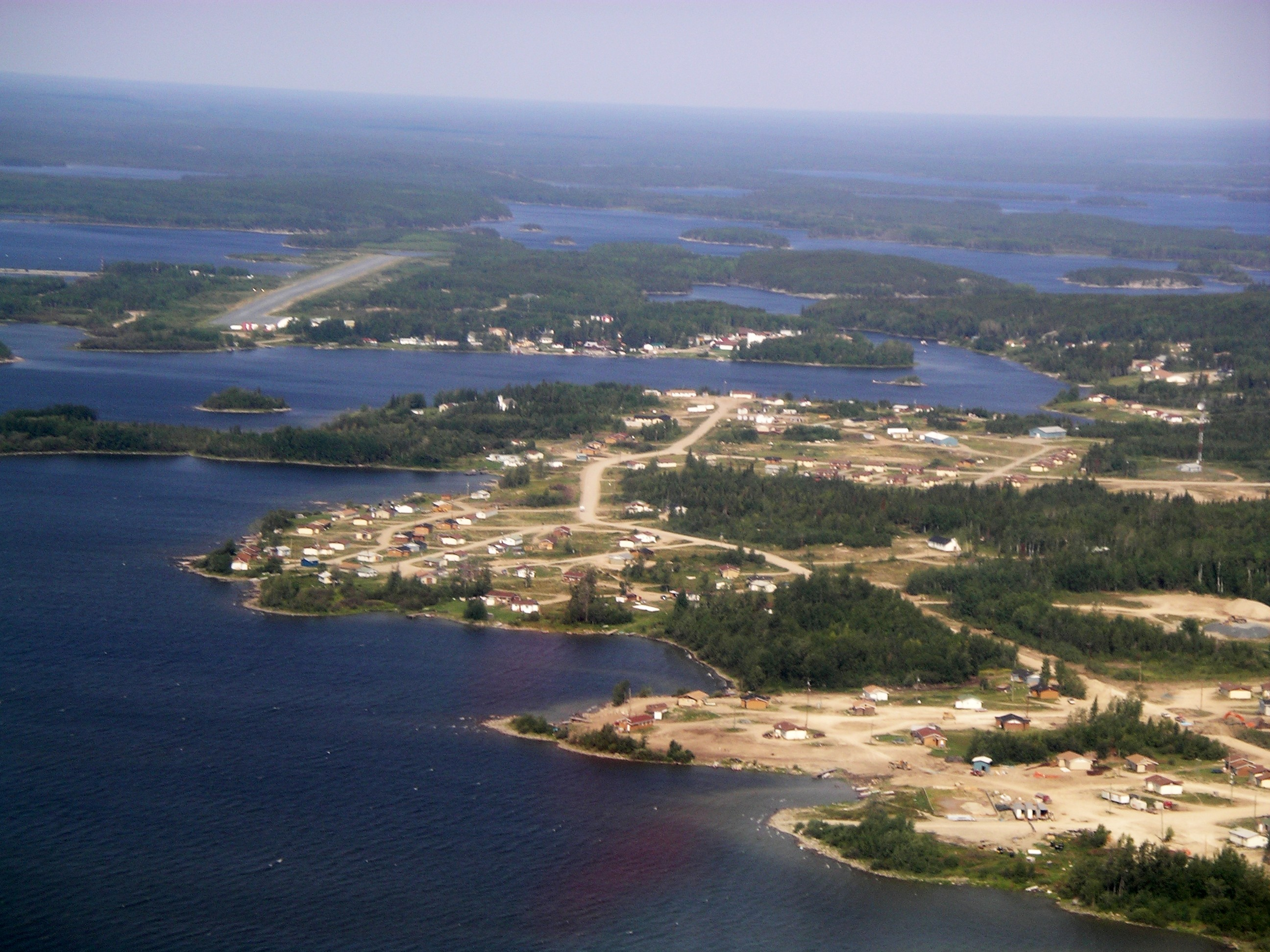
- Aerial view of the community

- Location of Island Lake
- Coordinates: 53°51′56″N 094°39′06″W
- Country: Canada
- Province: Manitoba

Area
  - Land: 1.99 km^{2} (0.77 sq mi)

Population (2016)
  - Total: 91

Island Lake is a small community in northeast Manitoba, Canada. The community consists of an archipelago near the north shore of Island Lake which includes the following islands: Red Sucker Lake, Garden Hill, Wasagamack, St Theresa Point.

The community is located 297 km (185 mi) southeast of Thompson, Manitoba and 610 km (380 mi) northeast of Winnipeg, Manitoba. Other nearby communities on the lake are Garden Hill, St. Theresa Point, and Wasagamack. The community is served by the Island Lake Airport.

The community of Island Lake consists of several government and private agencies such as a Royal Canadian Mounted Police detachment, a Manitoba Conservation office, Government of Manitoba (who operates the airport), Stevenson Island School (Frontier School Division), Bell MTS, Manitoba Hydro office, the North West Company, which operates the Northern Store, several small convenience stores and Island Lake Lodge, a fly fishing lodge on Stevenson Island.

Perimeter Aviation has daily service to Island Lake from Winnipeg James Armstrong Richardson International Airport using Bombardier Dash 8 and Fairchild Swearingen Metroliners. They also have a Medevac Base on Stevenson Island serving the community 365 days a year.

== Climate ==
With 21.11 hours of fog annually, Island Lake is one of the least foggy places in Canada. Only Penticton, British Columbia, gets less fog during the year, and no one gets less fog in February when Island Lake averages a mere 0.67 hours.

Island Lake has a subarctic climate (Dfc) with mild, rainy summers and severely cold winters.

Climate data for Island Lake
Month	Jan	Feb	Mar	Apr	May	Jun	Jul	Aug	Sep	Oct	Nov	Dec	Year
Record high °C (°F)	5.9 (42.6)	7.5 (45.5)	16.2 (61.2)	29.2 (84.6)	32.2 (90.0)	37.3 (99.1)	35 (95)	32.3 (90.1)	30.4 (86.7)	21.7 (71.1)	15 (59)	4.4 (39.9)	37.3 (99.1)
Mean daily maximum °C (°F)	−17.7 (0.1)	−12.4 (9.7)	−3.8 (25.2)	5.6 (42.1)	13.7 (56.7)	19.5 (67.1)	22.5 (72.5)	21.1 (70.0)	13.5 (56.3)	5.7 (42.3)	−4.9 (23.2)	−14.8 (5.4)	4 (39)
Daily mean °C (°F)	−22.9 (−9.2)	−18.6 (−1.5)	−10.8 (12.6)	−0.8 (30.6)	7.7 (45.9)	14 (57)	17.5 (63.5)	16.4 (61.5)	9.5 (49.1)	2.6 (36.7)	−8.3 (17.1)	−19.4 (−2.9)	−1.1 (30.0)
Mean daily minimum °C (°F)	−28.1 (−18.6)	−24.8 (−12.6)	−17.8 (0.0)	−7.1 (19.2)	1.5 (34.7)	8.4 (47.1)	12.5 (54.5)	11.6 (52.9)	5.5 (41.9)	−0.6 (30.9)	−11.6 (11.1)	−23.9 (−11.0)	−6.2 (20.8)
Record low °C (°F)	−45 (−49)	−43.3 (−45.9)	−42.2 (−44.0)	−28.9 (−20.0)	−16.6 (2.1)	−1.9 (28.6)	2.2 (36.0)	2.2 (36.0)	−4.4 (24.1)	−13.4 (7.9)	−34.8 (−30.6)	−43.3 (−45.9)	−45 (−49)
Average precipitation mm (inches)	20.1 (0.79)	18.6 (0.73)	24 (0.9)	26.2 (1.03)	42.8 (1.69)	69.1 (2.72)	89.4 (3.52)	77.4 (3.05)	61.8 (2.43)	55.8 (2.20)	36.3 (1.43)	24.4 (0.96)	546.2 (21.50)
Source: Environment Canada

== Demographics ==
In the 2021 Census of Population conducted by Statistics Canada, Island Lake had a population of 54 living in 21 of its 66 total private dwellings, a change of −31.6% from its 2016 population of 79. With a land area of 3.54 km^{2} (1.37 sq mi), it had a population density of 15.3/km^{2} (39.5/sq mi) in 2021.

== Gallery ==
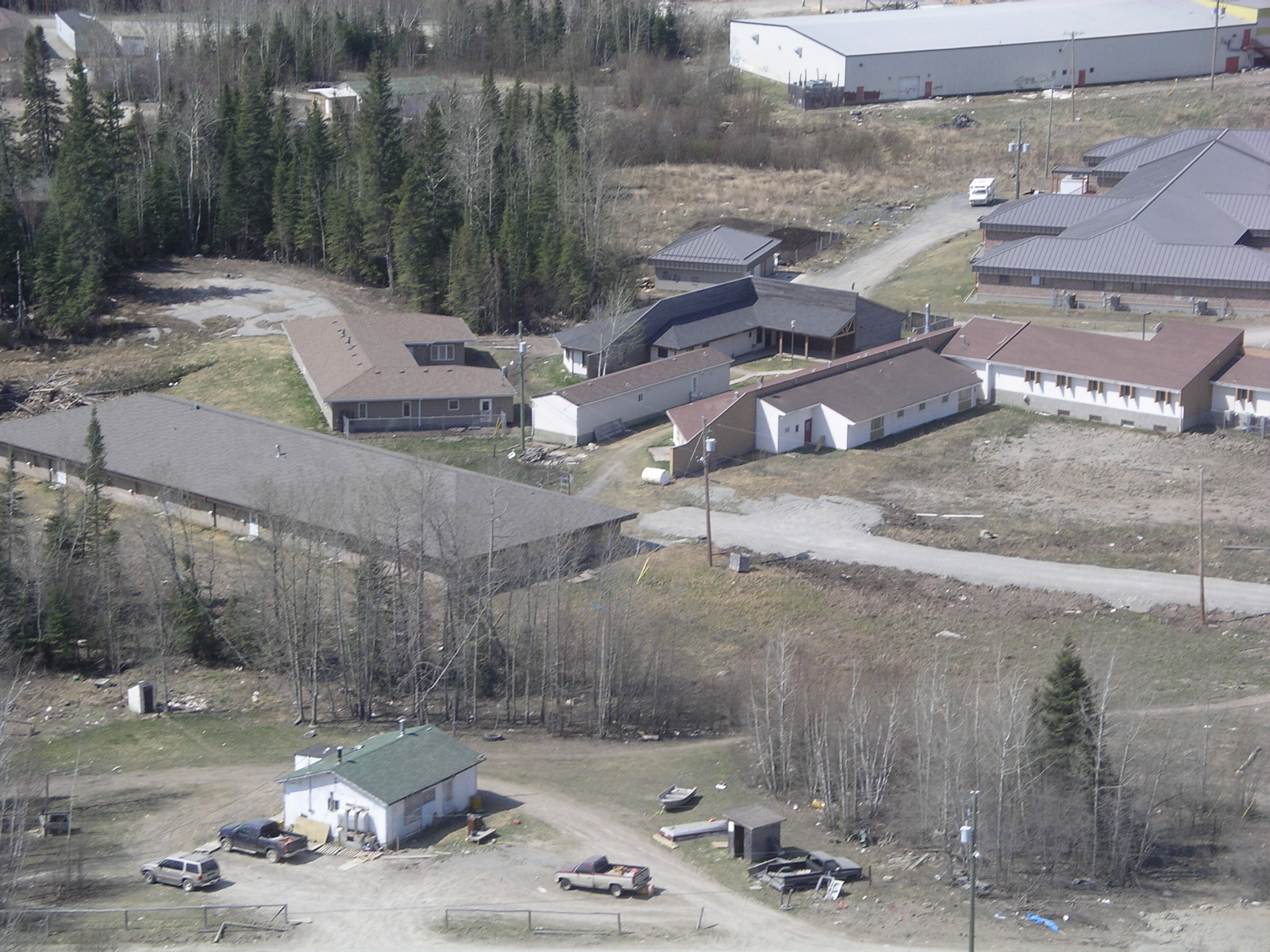
Garden Hill Health Centre

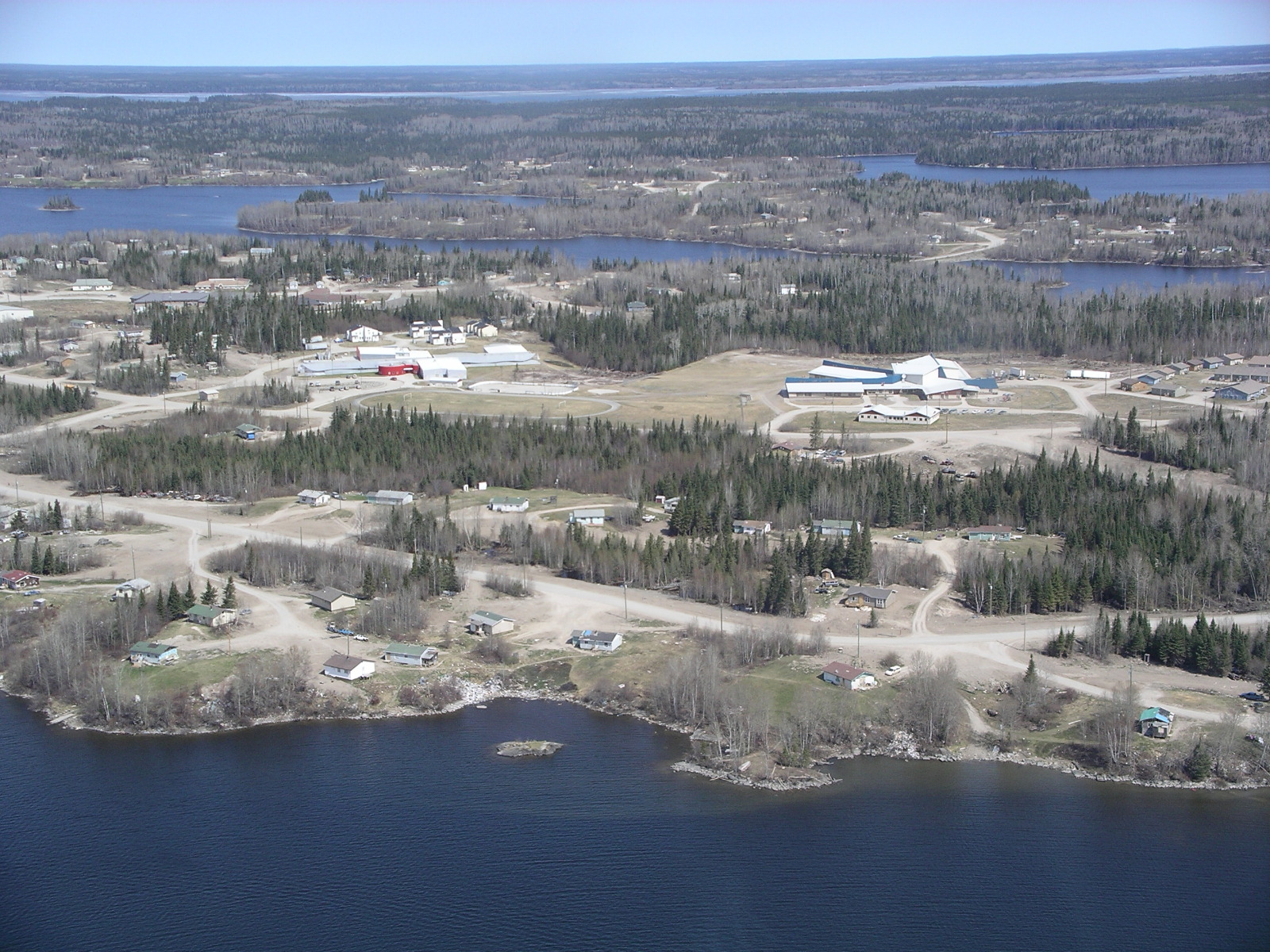
Garden Hill

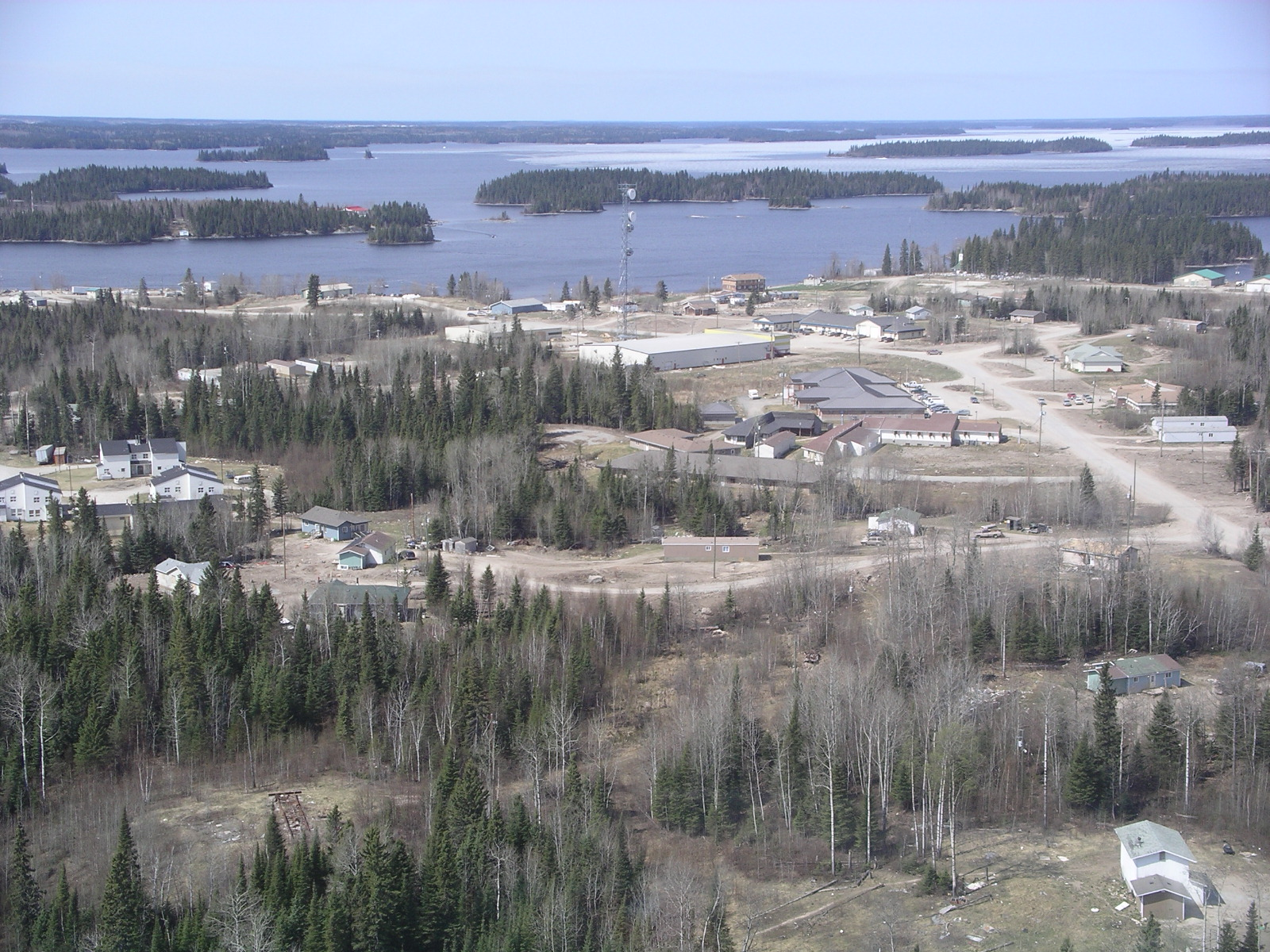
Garden Hill First Nations

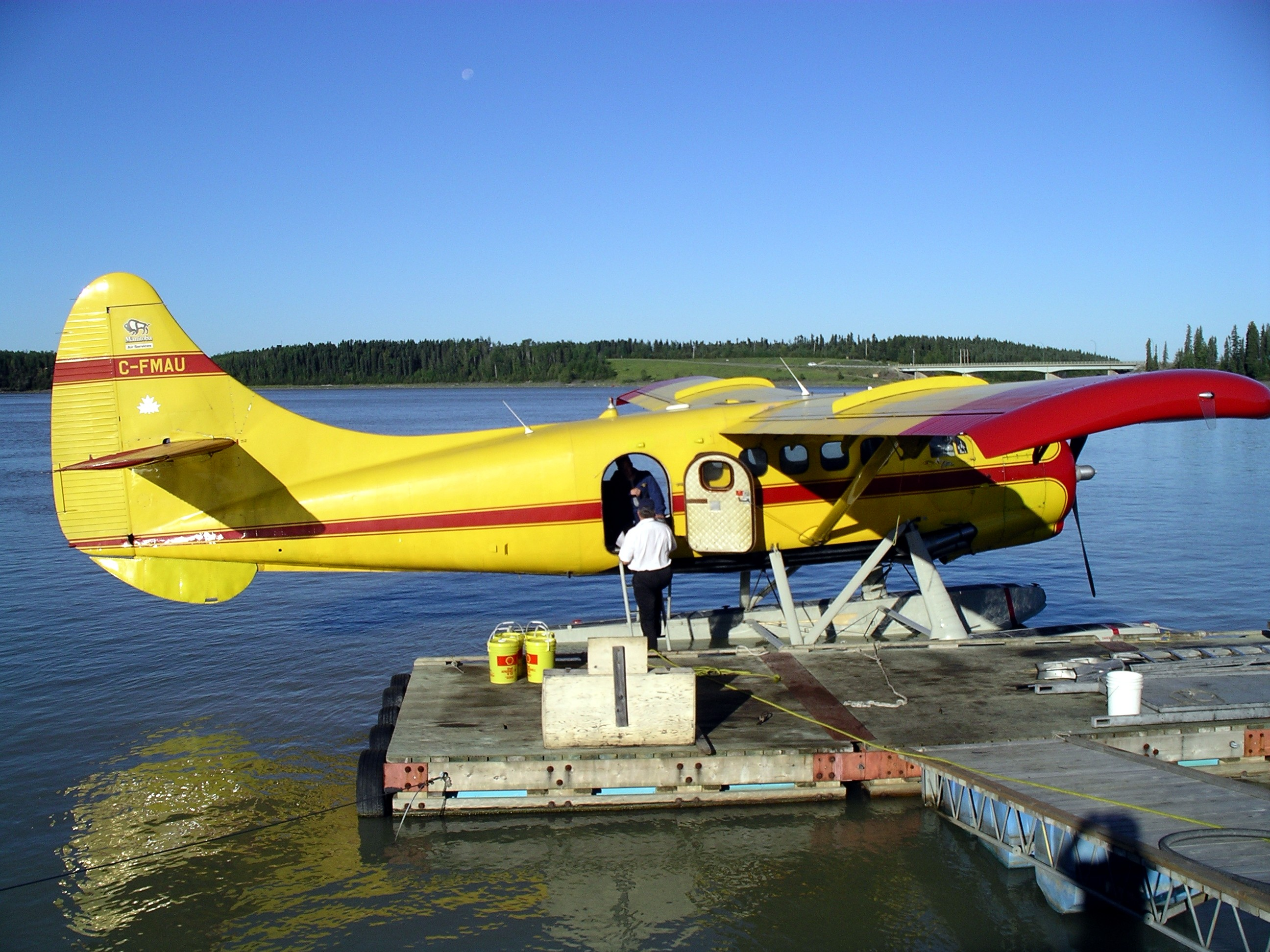
Island Lake Lodge dock
