= Island Lake (Manitoba) =

Lake in Manitoba, Canada

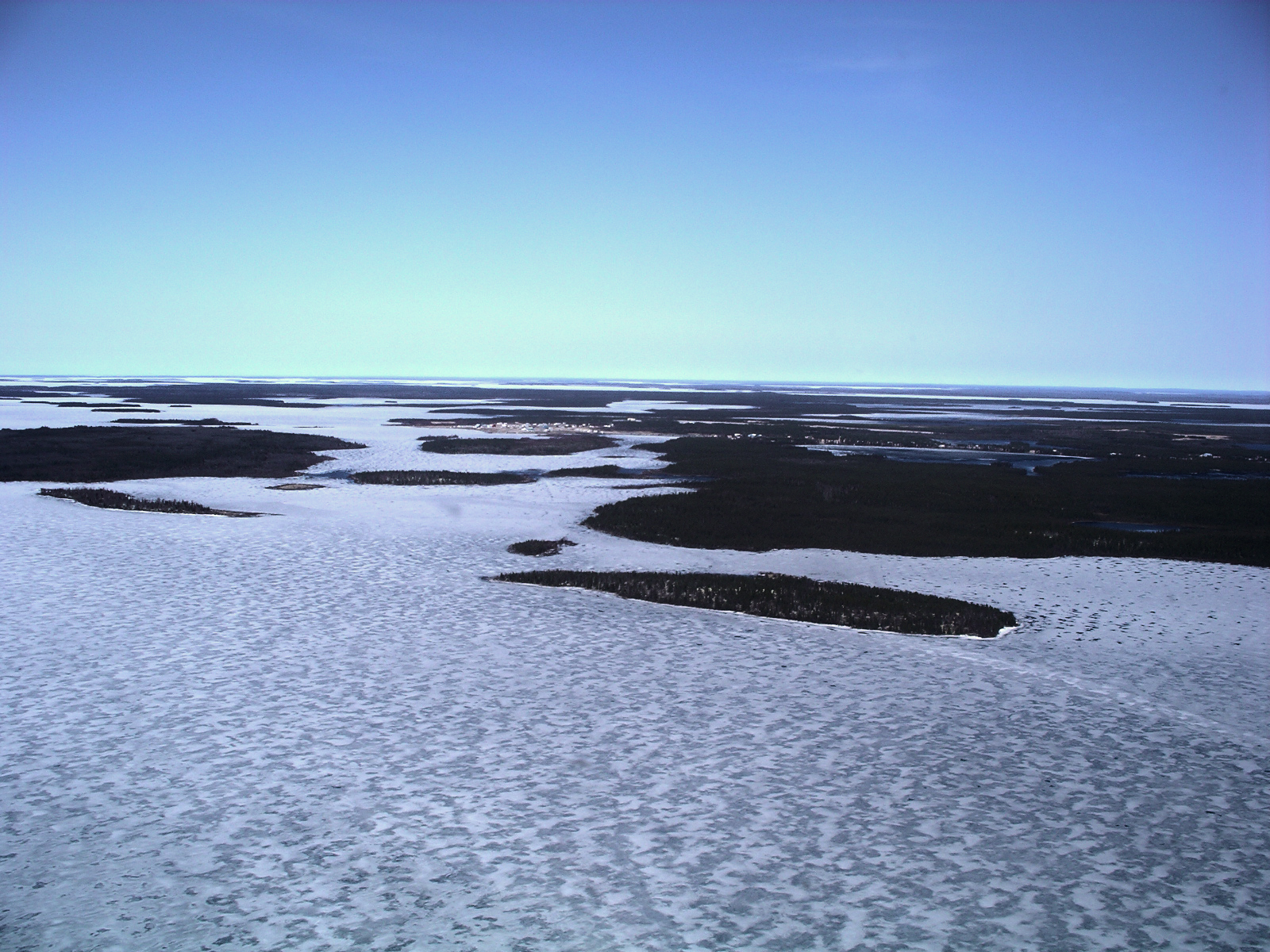
- St. Theresa Point on Island Lake

- Location in Manitoba Island Lake (Canada)
- Location: Division No. 22, Northeastern Manitoba
- Coordinates: 53°47′N 94°25′W
- Primary outflows: Island Lake River
- Catchment area: 20,000 km^{2} (7,700 sq mi)
- Basin countries: Canada
- Max. length: 85 km (53 mi)
- Surface area: 1,223 km^{2} (472 sq mi)
- Average depth: 20.1 m (66 ft)
- Max. depth: 59.4 m (195 ft)
- Residence time: 7.76 years
- Shore length^{1}: 745 km (463 mi)
- Surface elevation: 227 m (745 ft)
- Settlements: Garden Hill, Island Lake, St. Theresa Point, Wasagamack
- ^{1} Shore length is not a well-defined measure.

Island Lake is a lake in northeastern Manitoba in Canada, near the Ontario border. The lake covers a total area of 1,223 square kilometres (472 sq mi), making it the 6th largest lake in the province. The lake is in the Hayes River drainage basin. The Island Lake River flows north from the northwest section of the lake into Gods Lake via Goose Lake and Beaver Lake. Gods Lake drains north through Gods River into the Hayes River.

== Legal significance ==
A monument at the east end of the lake is a key point in the demarcation of the northeast–southwest boundary between Ontario and Manitoba. Contrary to popular belief, this part of the inter-provincial border is not a mere straight line from the northeast corner of Manitoba's pre-1912 border to Hudson Bay. Instead, the Manitoba Boundaries Extension Act, 1912 and the Ontario Boundaries Extension Act, 1912 define a corner at the east end of Island Lake (where the monument now sits) and from where the border continues to run in a slightly more north-south direction until it intersects with Hudson Bay at 89th meridian west.

== Settlements ==
Located on the lake are the First Nations communities of Wasagamack, St. Theresa Point and Garden Hill and the northern settlement of Island Lake which in 2011 had a combined population of 7,120.

Wasagamack had a population of 1,411 in the Canada Census of 2011 and St. Theresa Point had 2,871. Both are located on the western side of the lake. About 18 km (11 miles) east across the bay are Garden Hill with a population of 2,776 and nearby Island Lake with 62 residents. The northern settlement of Island Lake is located on several islands.

== Gallery ==
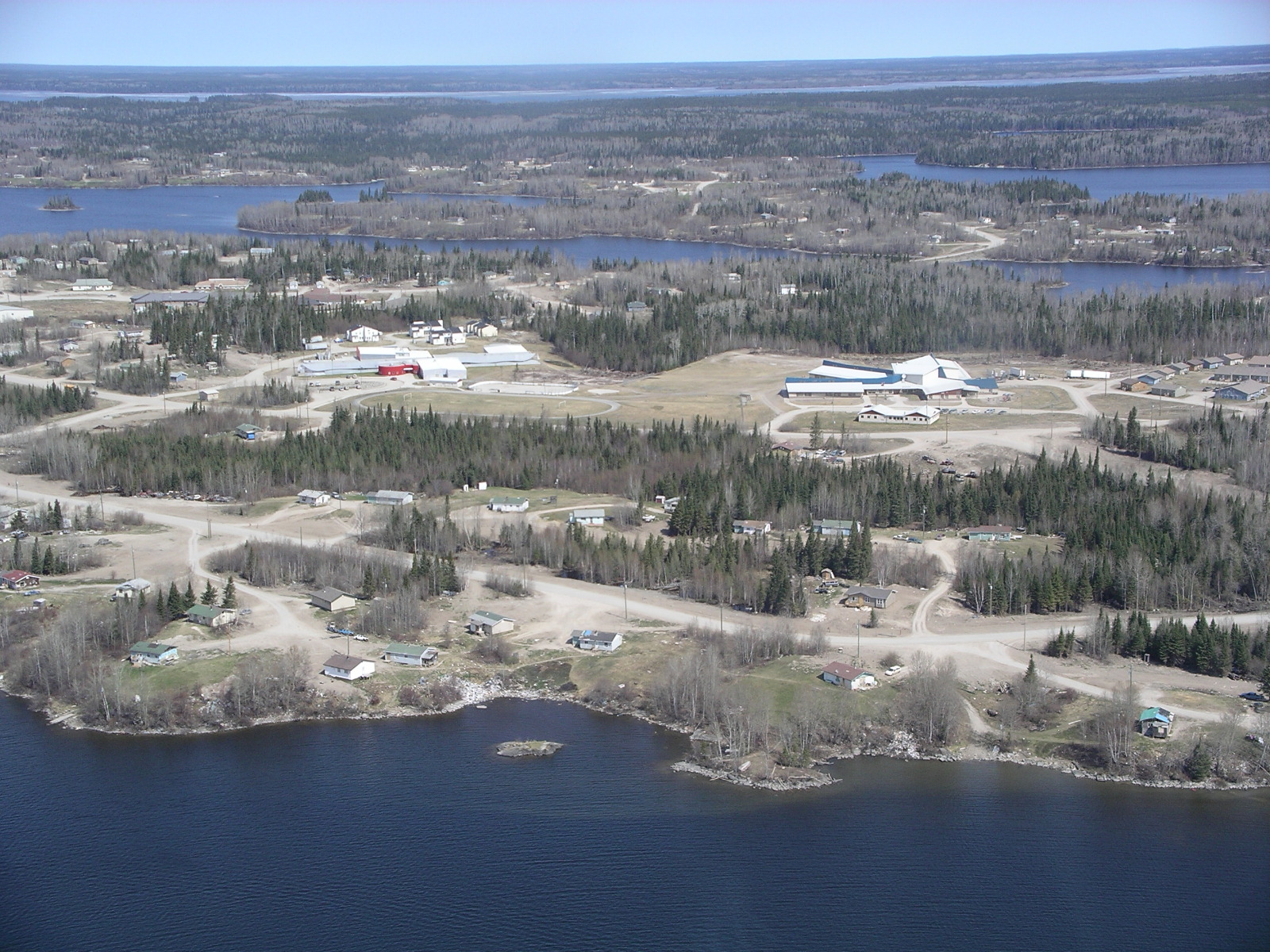
Garden Hill looking north

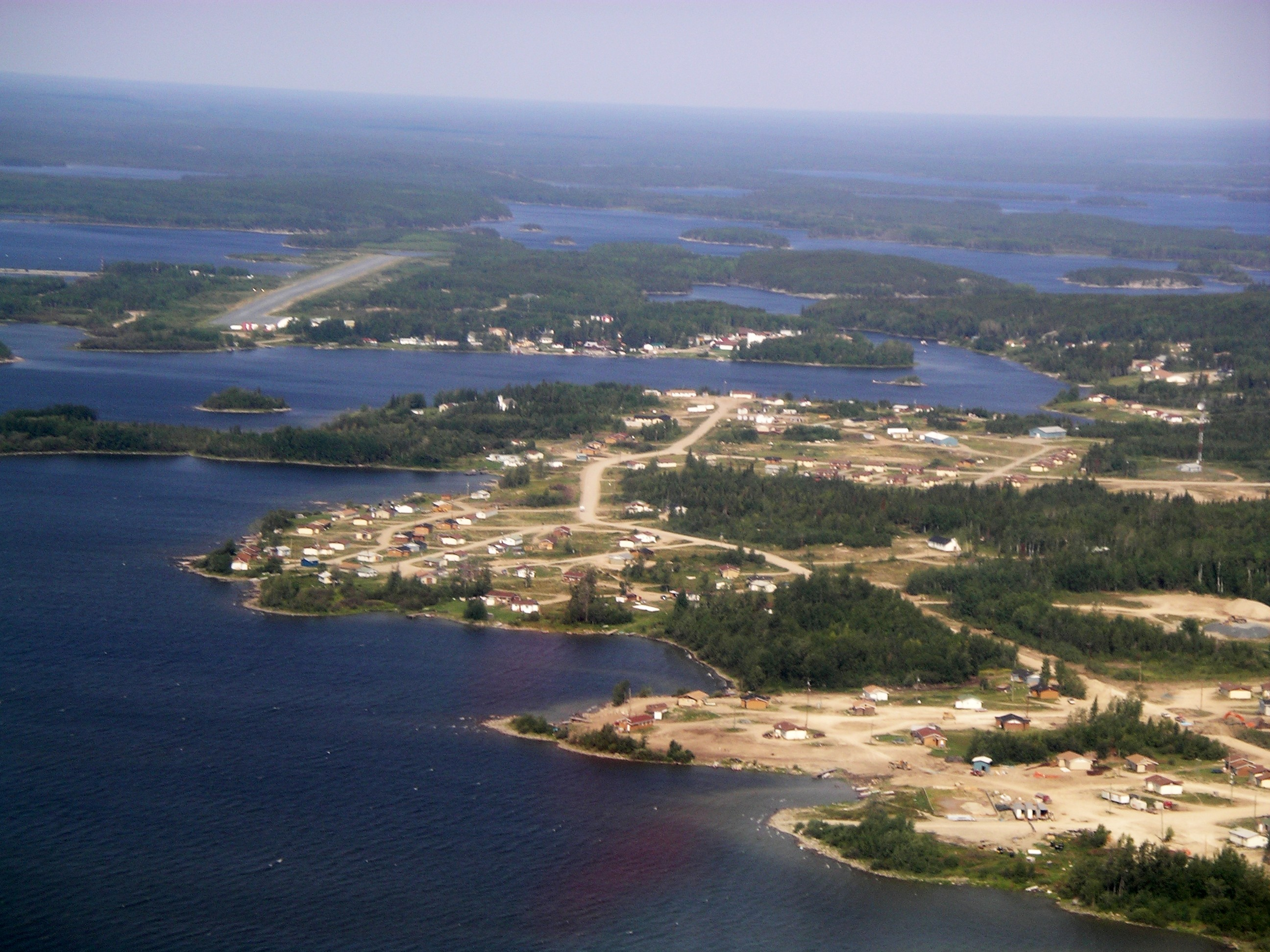
View of Island Lake/Garden Hill

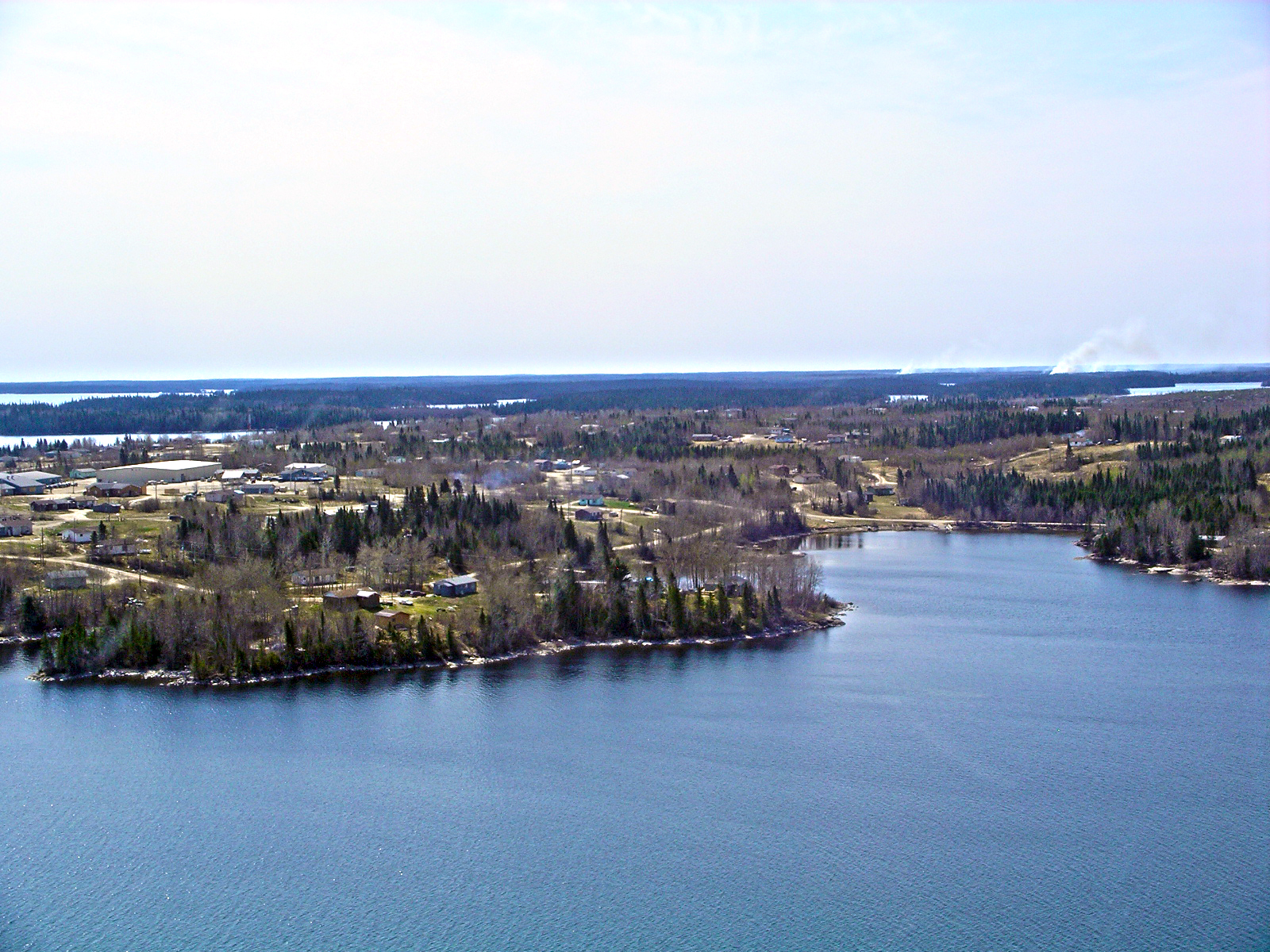
St. Theresa Point

== Climate ==
Climate data for Island Lake
Month	Jan	Feb	Mar	Apr	May	Jun	Jul	Aug	Sep	Oct	Nov	Dec	Year
Record high °C (°F)	5.9 (42.6)	7.5 (45.5)	16.2 (61.2)	29.2 (84.6)	32.2 (90.0)	37.3 (99.1)	35 (95)	32.5 (90.5)	30.4 (86.7)	21.7 (71.1)	15 (59)	4.4 (39.9)	37.3 (99.1)
Mean daily maximum °C (°F)	−17.7 (0.1)	−12.4 (9.7)	−3.8 (25.2)	5.6 (42.1)	13.7 (56.7)	19.5 (67.1)	22.5 (72.5)	21.1 (70.0)	13.5 (56.3)	5.7 (42.3)	−4.9 (23.2)	−14.8 (5.4)	4 (39)
Daily mean °C (°F)	−22.9 (−9.2)	−18.6 (−1.5)	−10.8 (12.6)	−0.8 (30.6)	7.7 (45.9)	14 (57)	17.5 (63.5)	16.4 (61.5)	9.5 (49.1)	2.6 (36.7)	−8.3 (17.1)	−19.4 (−2.9)	−1.1 (30.0)
Mean daily minimum °C (°F)	−28.1 (−18.6)	−24.8 (−12.6)	−17.8 (0.0)	−7.1 (19.2)	1.5 (34.7)	8.4 (47.1)	12.5 (54.5)	11.6 (52.9)	5.5 (41.9)	−0.6 (30.9)	−11.6 (11.1)	−23.9 (−11.0)	−6.2 (20.8)
Record low °C (°F)	−45 (−49)	−43.3 (−45.9)	−42.2 (−44.0)	−28.9 (−20.0)	−16.6 (2.1)	−1.9 (28.6)	2.2 (36.0)	2.2 (36.0)	−4.4 (24.1)	−13.4 (7.9)	−34.8 (−30.6)	−43.3 (−45.9)	−45 (−49)
Average precipitation mm (inches)	20.1 (0.79)	18.9 (0.74)	24 (0.9)	26.2 (1.03)	42.8 (1.69)	69.1 (2.72)	89.4 (3.52)	77.4 (3.05)	61.8 (2.43)	55.8 (2.20)	36.3 (1.43)	24.4 (0.96)	546.2 (21.50)
Source: Environment Canada

== See also ==
- List of lakes of Manitoba
