= Wasagamack =

Coordinates: 53°54′30″N 94°56′45″W

Location of Wasagamack in Manitoba

Wasagamack or Waasagomach is a community in the Canadian province of Manitoba. It is a settlement of the Wasagamack First Nation located on the western shore of Island Lake on Waasagomach Bay north of St. Theresa Point. It is only accessible by boat across Island Lake, ice roads or by air. Wasagamack had a population of 1,411 in the 2011 Canadian census.
