= St. Theresa Point First Nation =

St. Theresa Point
- Indian reserve
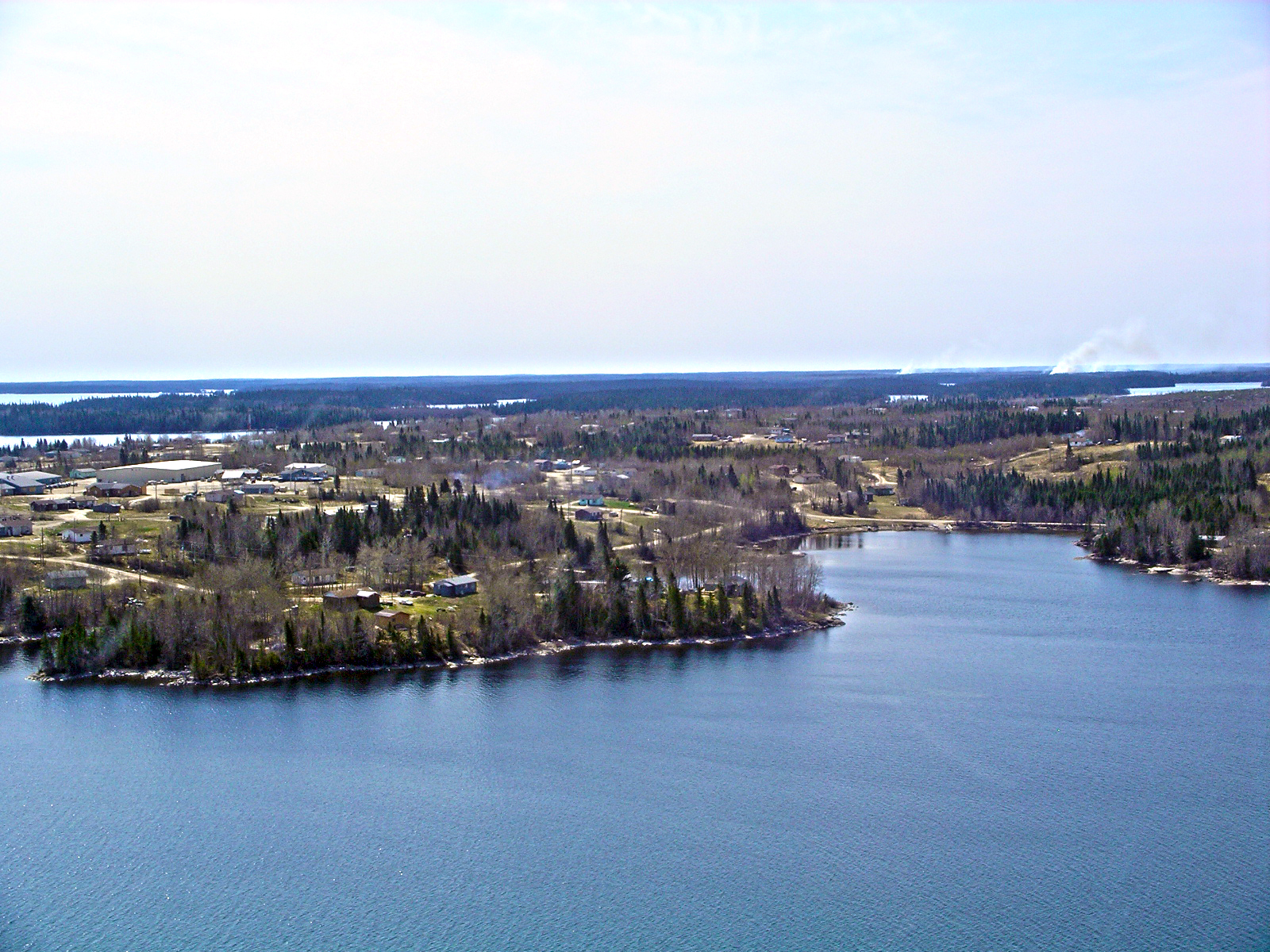

- Location of St. Theresa Point in Manitoba
- Coordinates: 53°48′45″N 94°55′05″W
- Country: Canada
- Province: Manitoba
- Region: Northern

Government
  - Type: Band
  - Chief: Elden flett
  - MLA: Ian Bushie (Keewatinook)
  - MP: Rebecca Chartrand (Churchill—Keewatinook Aski)

Area
  - Land: 153.89 km^{2} (59.42 sq mi)
- Elevation: 250 m (820 ft)

Population (2016)
  - Total: 3,262
  - Density: 21.2/km^{2} (55/sq mi)
- Time zone: UTC-6 (CST)
  - Summer (DST): UTC-5 (CDT)
- St. Theresa Point First Nation
- Band No. 298
- Treaty: Treaty 5
- Province: Manitoba

Land
- Main reserve: St. Theresa Point
- Reserves: Cantin Lake; Mukwa Narrows
- Land area: 28.85 km^{2} (11.14 sq mi)

Government
- Chief: Marie A. Wood
- Council size: 9

Tribal Council
- Island Lake Tribal Council

Website
- stpfirstnation.com

St. Theresa Point Ansininew (Oji-Cree: Minithayinikam) is a First Nations community in northern Manitoba. It has 3 reserves in total, the largest and most populated of which is St. Theresa Point, which is bordered by the unorganized portion of Division No. 22, Manitoba, and by the Wasagamack First Nation.

The reserve is only accessible by airplane or winter ice roads (which continue north towards Garden Hill, and southwest towards Manigotagan, with a branch leading towards Berens River). The community is served by the nearby St. Theresa Point Airport. It has a local educational institution, St Theresa Point Regional Centre, with courses offered by the University College of the North and Assiniboine Community College.

== Demographics ==
The community had a population of 2,871 in the Canada census of 2011 an increase of 9.1% from a 2006 population of 2,632. The median age was 20.1. The population density was 18.7 per km2 and the land area was 153.38 km2. There are 478 housing units within the community.

== St. Theresa Point Ansininew ==
St. Theresa Point Ansininew is the First Nations located at the center of St. Theresa Point.

St. Theresa Point Ansininew once belonged to the Island Lake band, who, on 13 August 1909, became a signatory of Treaty 5. In 1969, Island Lake split into four separate communities with their own separate administrations: Garden Hill, Wasagamack, Red Sucker Lake, and St. Theresa Point First Nations. Today, the 4 communities have a tribal council, called Island Lake Tribal Council, to collaborate on common interests.

In 2011, the Island Lake communities (including St. Theresa Point AN) had a combined population of 7,120.

As of December 2014, the First Nation had a registered population of 4,069, out of which 3,795 lived on their own reserve. The First Nation has a Custom Electoral System and is governed by an elected Chief and eight councillors. Along with Island Lake Tribal Council, the First Nation is affiliated with Manitoba Keewatinohk Okimahkanak (MKO), Assembly of Manitoba Chiefs (AMC), and Crown–Indigenous Relations and Northern Affairs Canada.

=== Territory ===
St. Theresa Point First Nation has three reserves:

- Cantin Lake (53°25′30″N 95°9′0″W) — located on the south shore and east shore of Cantin Lake; total size of 1,912.10 ha (4,724.9 acres)
- Mukwa Narrows (53°2′11″N 94°57′44″W) — 140 km east of Negginan and northwest of Elliot Lake 890.30 ha (2,200.0 acres)
- St. Theresa Point — on the west shore of Island Lake; total size of 2,885 hectares (7,130 acres) (53°48′45″N 94°55′5″W)

== Notable people ==
- Judy Klassen - former MLA for Kewatinook and interim leader of the Manitoba Liberal Party.
