= Red Sucker Lake Airport =

Airport in Manitoba, Canada

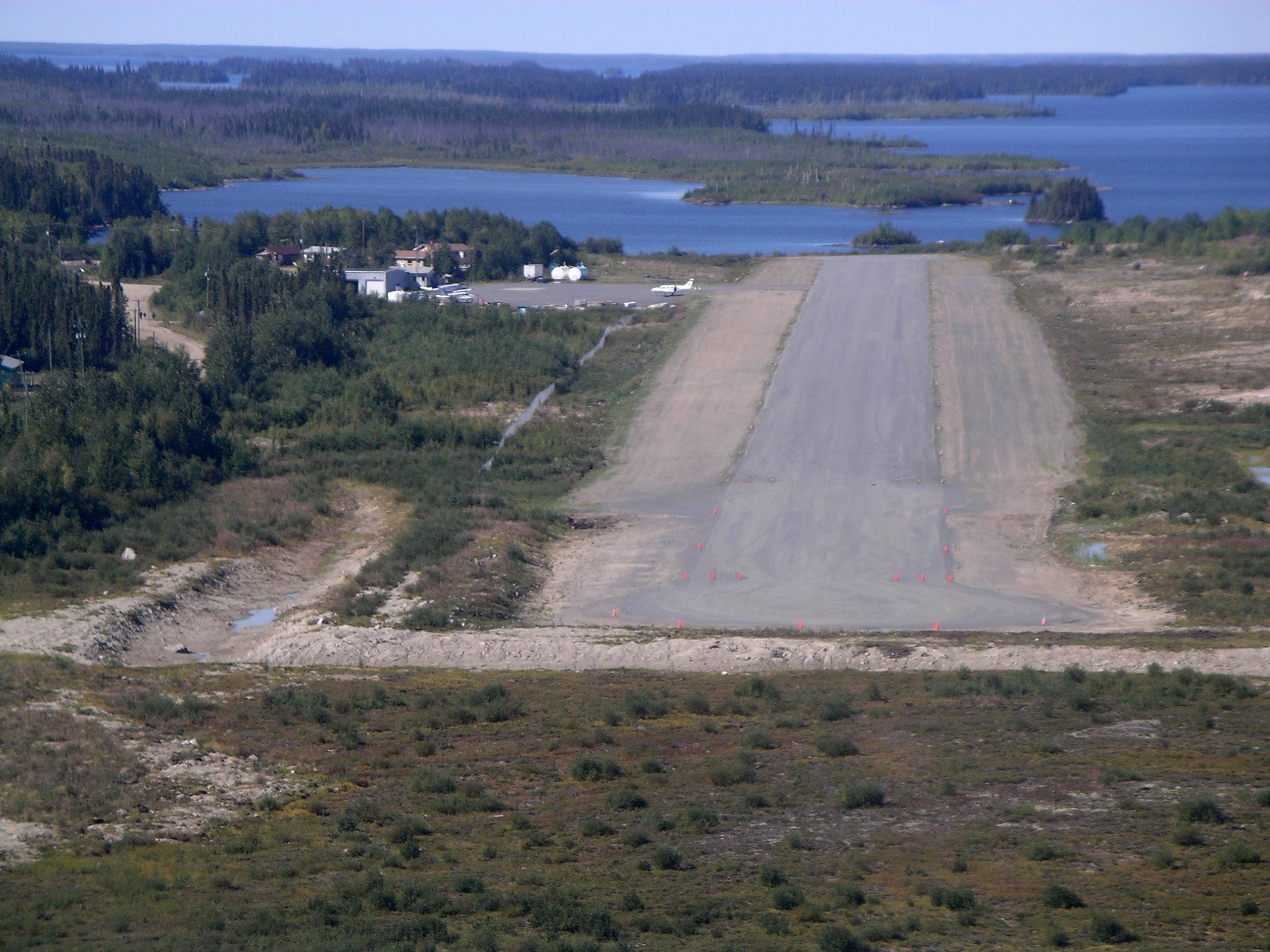
- Runway 26 (now 27), short final

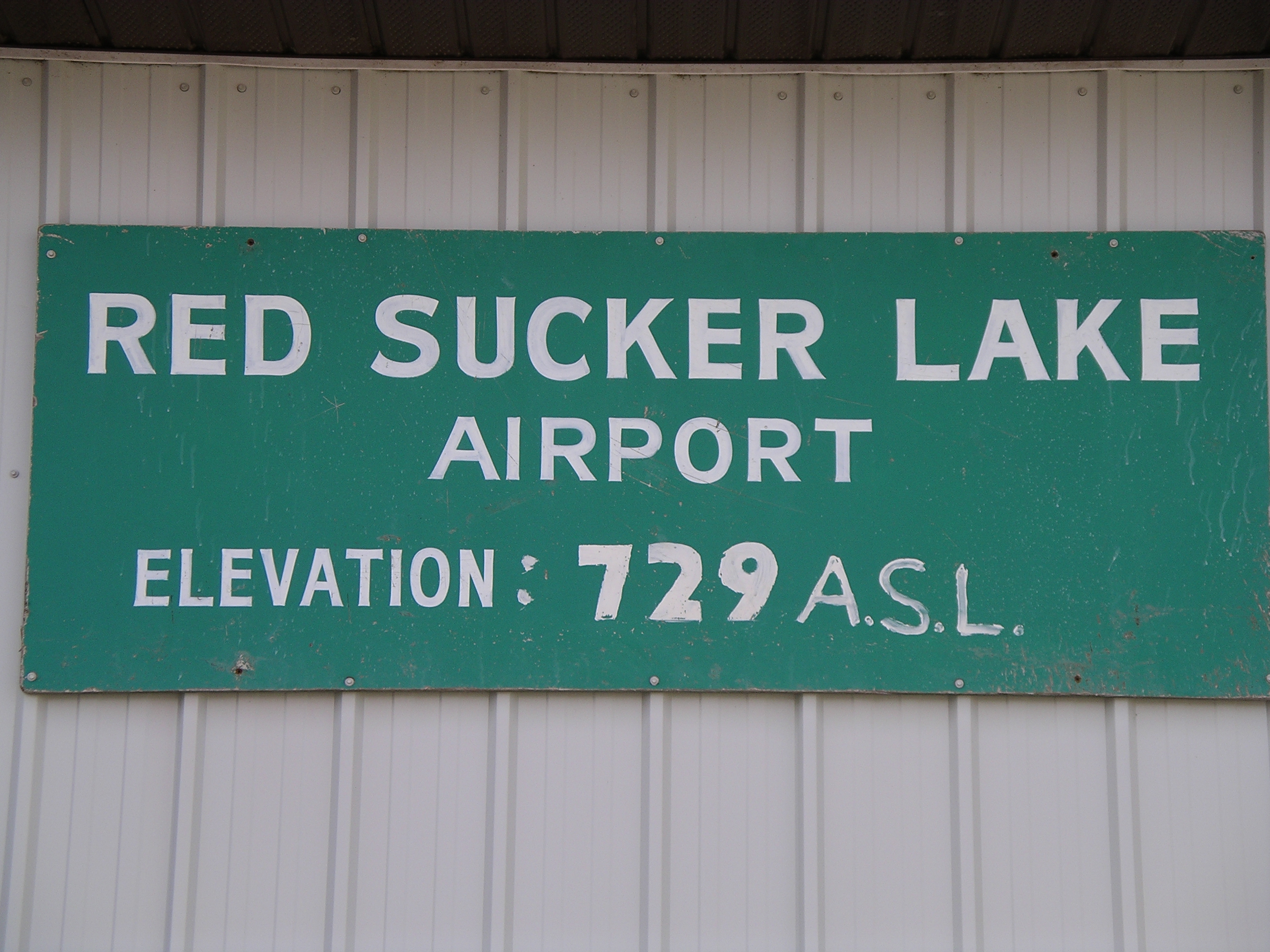
- Old elevation sign
- IATA: YRS; ICAO: CYRS

Summary
- Airport type: Public
- Operator: Government of Manitoba
- Location: Red Sucker Lake, Manitoba
- Time zone: CST (UTC−06:00)
  - Summer (DST): CDT (UTC−05:00)
- Elevation AMSL: 747 ft / 228 m
- Coordinates: 54°10′03″N 093°33′27″W

Map
- Location in Manitoba CYRS (Canada)

Runways
Direction	Length		Surface
Direction	ft	m	Surface
09/27	3,552	1,083	Crushed rock

Statistics (2010)
- Aircraft movements: 1,901
- Source: Canada Flight Supplement; Movements from Statistics Canada.

Red Sucker Lake Airport (IATA: YRS, ICAO: CYRS) is located adjacent to Red Sucker Lake, Manitoba, Canada.

== Airlines and destinations ==
Airlines	Destinations
Northway Aviation	Garden Hill, Winnipeg/St. Andrews
Perimeter Aviation	Garden Hill, Winnipeg

== See also ==
- List of airports in Manitoba
- Red Sucker Lake Water Aerodrome
