= Red Sucker Lake, Manitoba =

Coordinates: 54.150°N 93.578°W

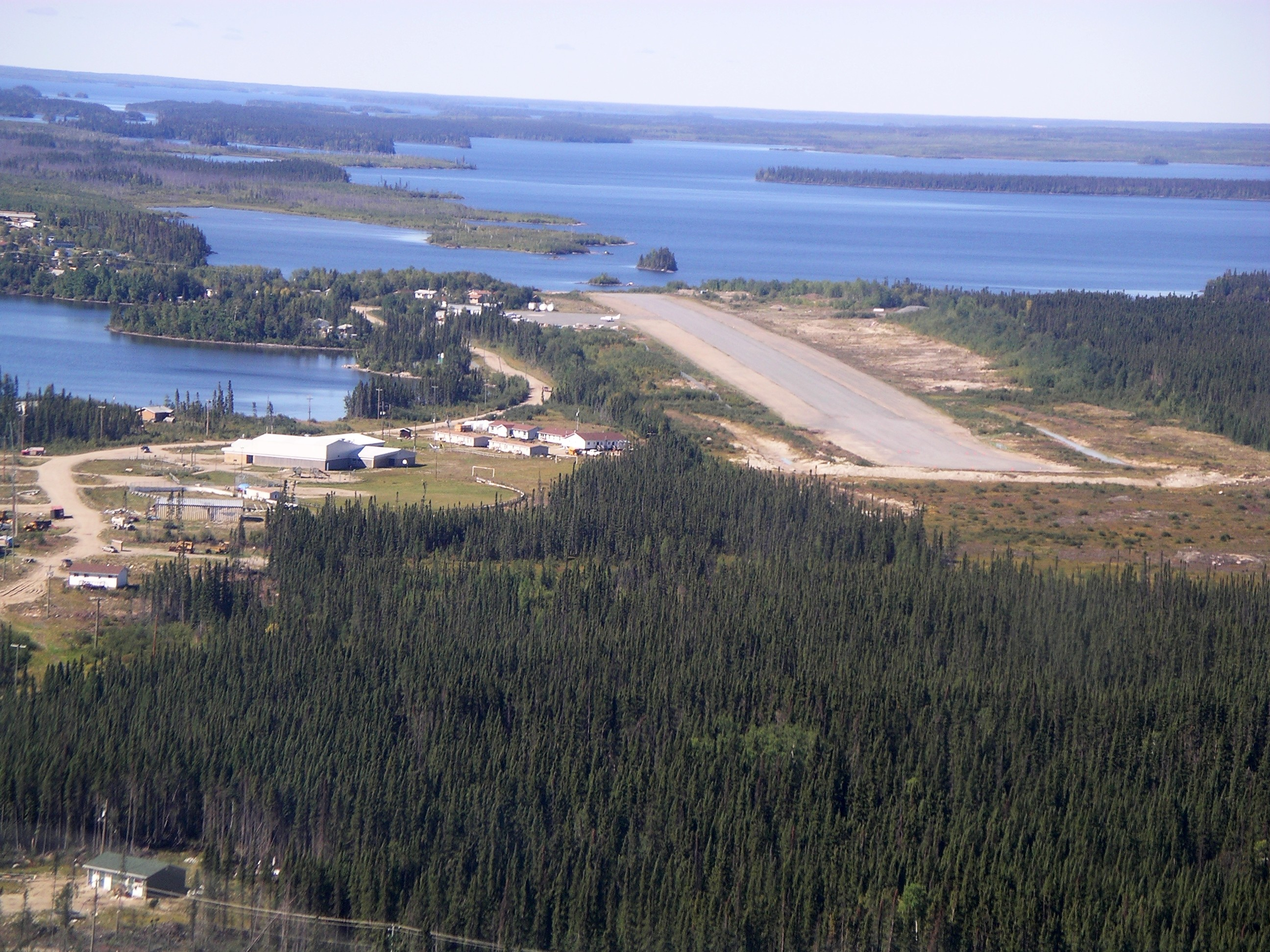
A view of part of the community and airport

Red Sucker Lake is a designated place in northeast Manitoba, Canada adjacent to the Red Sucker Lake 1976 Indian Reserve, which is part of the Red Sucker Lake First Nation. It is located approximately 532 km (331 mi) southeast of Thompson.

== Demographics ==
In the 2021 Census of Population conducted by Statistics Canada, Red Sucker Lake had a population of 10 living in 5 of its 8 total private dwellings, a change of −33.3% from its 2016 population of 15. With a land area of 0.65 km^{2} (0.25 sq mi), it had a population density of 15.4/km^{2} (39.8/sq mi) in 2021.
