= List of provincial parks in Manitoba =

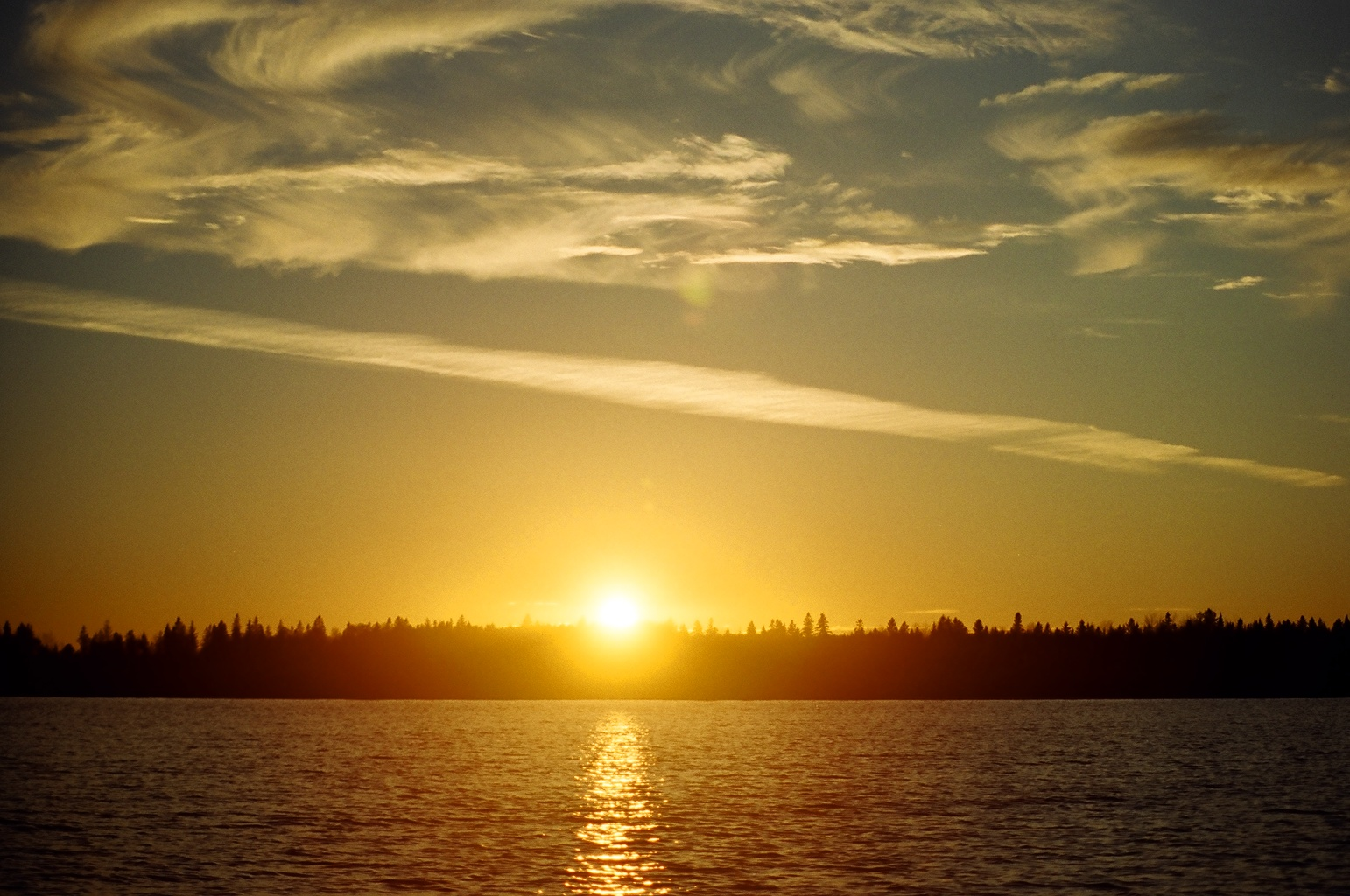
Falcon Lake in Whiteshell Provincial Park

This is a list of provincial parks in Manitoba, Canada. Manitoba's provincial parks are maintained by the Department of Natural Resources and Northern Development (previously by Manitoba Environment and Climate), a department of the Government of Manitoba.

Manitoba's parks are classified into one of the following types, as distinguished by the Provincial Parks Act: Wilderness, Natural, Recreation, and Heritage.

== Provincial Parks Act ==
The Provincial Parks Act is the key document outlining the management of Manitoba's provincial parks.

This legislation provides for parks to be dedicated for three purposes:

1. to conserve ecosystems and maintain biodiversity;
2. to preserve unique and representative natural, cultural and heritage resources;
3. to provide outdoor recreational and educational opportunities and experiences in a natural setting.

The legislation distinguishes several types of park, and each provincial park must be classified as one of these types:

- Wilderness, "if the main purpose of the designation is to preserve representative areas of a natural region;"
- Natural, "if the main purpose of the designation is both to preserve areas of a natural region and to accommodate a diversity of recreational opportunities and resource uses;"
- Recreation, "if the main purpose of the designation is to provide recreational opportunities;"
- Heritage, "if the main purpose of the designation is to preserve an area of land containing a resource or resources of cultural or heritage value;" and
- "any other type of provincial park that may be specified in the regulation."

== List of provincial parks ==
Name	Region	Est.	Area	Type	Type and Picture	Coordinates
Asessippi Provincial Park	Parkland	1964	23.2 km^{2} (9.0 sq mi)	Natural		50°57′59″N 101°22′47″W
Atikaki Provincial Park	Eastman	1985	3,981 km^{2} (1,537 sq mi)	Wilderness		51°30′0″N 95°31′0″W
Bakers Narrows Provincial Park	Northern	1961	145.12 ha (358.6 acres)	Recreational		54°40′16″N 101°40′30″W
Beaudry Provincial Park	Central (Winnipeg)	1974	9.50 km^{2} (3.67 sq mi)	Natural		49.8539°N 97.4733°W
Beaver Creek Provincial Park	Interlake	1961	28 ha (69 acres)	Recreational		51.3764°N 96.9156°W
Bell Lake Provincial Park	Northern	1974	3.96 ha (9.8 acres)	Recreational		52°32′30″N 101°14′29″W
Birch Island Provincial Park	Parkland	2010	80,600 hectares (311 sq mi)	Natural		52.38972°N 99.95472°W
Birch Point Provincial Park	Eastman	1961	13 ha (32 acres)	Recreational		49.16861°N 95.2325°W
Birds Hill Provincial Park	Central (Winnipeg)	1964	3,510 ha (8,700 acres)	Natural		50.02444°N 96.88361°W
Burge Lake Provincial Park	Northern	1961	6.12 ha (15.1 acres)	Recreational		56°54′8″N 101°2′6″W
Camp Morton Provincial Park	Interlake	1974	250 ha (620 acres)	Recreational		50.71°N 96.99027°W
Caribou River Provincial Park	Northern	1994	764,000 ha (1,890,000 acres)	Wilderness		59.5636°N 96.6611°W
Chitek Lake Anishinaabe Provincial Park	Parkland	2014	100,300 ha (248,000 acres)	Indigenous Traditional Use		52.44977°N 99.48841°W
Clearwater Lake Provincial Park	Northern	1962	59,300 ha (147,000 acres)	Natural		54.08305°N 101.078333°W
Colvin Lake Provincial Park	Northern	2010	1,630 km^{2} (630 sq mi)			59°41′2″N 101°33′40″W
Criddle/Vane Homestead Provincial Park	Westman	2004	132 ha (330 acres)	Heritage		49.70861°N 99.60416°W
Duck Mountain Provincial Park	Parkland	1961		Natural		51.6661°N 100.914°W
Duff Roblin Provincial Park	Central (Winnipeg)	2008		Heritage		49.9511°N 96.9894°W
Elk Island Provincial Park	Eastman	1974		Natural		50.75472°N 96.54583°W
Fisher Bay Provincial Park	Interlake	2011				51.66111°N 97.16916°W
Goose Islands Provincial Park	Interlake	2017	137 ha (340 acres)	Natural		52.745°N 99.734167°W
Grand Beach Provincial Park	Interlake	1961		Natural		50.5681°N 96.5617°W
Grand Rapids Provincial Park	Northern	1974	7.36 ha (18.2 acres)	Recreational		53°8′31″N 99°17′6″W
Grand Valley Provincial Park	Westman	1961		Recreational		49.87333°N 100.08444°W
Grass River Provincial Park	Northern	1962		Natural		54.6664°N 100.831°W
Hecla-Grindstone Provincial Park	Interlake	1969		Natural		51.185°N 96.5817°W
Hnausa Beach Provincial Park	Interlake	1961		Recreational		50.90027°N 96.99222°W
Hyland Provincial Park	Central (Winnipeg)	1976		Recreational		49.983611111111°N 97.049722222222°W
Kettle Stones Provincial Park	Parkland	1997		Natural		52.35916°N 100.59527°W
Kinwow Bay Provincial Park	Interlake	2015				52.022924°N 97.415085°W
Lake St. Andrew Provincial Park	Interlake	1974		Recreational		51.68083°N 97.40444°W
Lake St. George Provincial Park	Interlake	1974		Recreational		51.72777°N 97.42944°W
Little Limestone Lake Provincial Park	Northern	2011				53°46′0″N 99°20′1″W
Lockport Provincial Park	Interlake	1997		Heritage		50.08583°N 96.93638°W
Lundar Beach Provincial Park	Interlake	1961		Recreational		50.7242°N 98.2728°W
Manigotagan River Provincial Park	Eastman	2004		Natural		51.01388°N 96.04416°W
Manipogo Provincial Park	Interlake	1961		Recreational		51.51666°N 99.54972°W
Marchand Provincial Park	Eastman	1974		Recreational		49.4325°N 96.27472°W
Margaret Bruce Provincial Park	Parkland	1961		Recreational		50.81805°N 98.8025°W
Memorial Provincial Park	Central (Winnipeg)	1965		Heritage		49.8867458°N 97.1491022°W
Moose Lake Provincial Park	Eastman	1961		Recreational		49.211666666667°N 95.316111111111°W
Neso Lake Provincial Park	Northern	1974	1.33 ha (3.3 acres)	Recreational		54°39′26″N 101°32′49″W
Netley Creek Provincial Park	Interlake	1974		Recreational		50.288055555556°N 96.863888888889°W
Nopiming Provincial Park	Eastman	1976		Natural		50.667°N 95.283°W
Norris Lake Provincial Park	Interlake	1974		Recreational		50.48222°N 97.41722°W
North Steeprock Lake Provincial Park	Northern	1997		Recreational		52°35′58″N 101°20′59″W
Nueltin Lake Provincial Park	Northern	2010				59°37′57″N 99°34′42″W
Numaykoos Lake Provincial Park	Northern	1995		Wilderness		57.865277777778°N 95.963333333333°W
Oak Lake Provincial Park	Westman	1961		Recreational		49.68111°N 100.71°W
Overflowing River Provincial Park	Northern	1961	13.11 ha (32.4 acres)	Recreational		53°8′23″N 101°5′15″W
Paint Lake Provincial Park	Northern	1971	22,740 ha (56,200 acres)	Natural		55°29′45″N 97°59′20″W
Patricia Beach Provincial Park	Interlake	1961		Recreational		50.426944444444°N 96.606111111111°W
Pembina Valley Provincial Park	Pembina Valley	2001		Natural		49.0031°N 98.1623°W
Pinawa Dam Provincial Park	Eastman	1985		Heritage		50.215833333333°N 95.928611111111°W
Pinawa Provincial Park	Eastman	1974		Recreational		50.14166°N 96.04833°W
Pisew Falls Provincial Park	Northern	1974	92.86 ha (229.5 acres)	Recreational		55°11′52″N 98°23′48″W
Poplar Bay Provincial Park	Eastman	1961		Recreational		50.375°N 95.781944444444°W
Portage Spillway Provincial Park	Central Plains	1997		Recreational		49.948888888889°N 98.328888888889°W
Primrose Provincial Park	Parkland	1974		Recreational		52.397777777778°N 101.12111111111°W
Rainbow Beach Provincial Park	Parkland	1961		Recreational		51.1289°N 99.8136°W
Red Deer River Provincial Park	Northern	1974	1 ha (2.5 acres)	Recreational		52°53′28″N 101°1′32″W
River Road Provincial Park	Central (Winnipeg)	1997		Recreational		50.055555555556°N 96.987222222222°W
Rivers Provincial Park	Westman	1961		Recreational		50.04°N 100.195°W
Rocky Lake Provincial Park	Northern	1961	23.94 ha (59.2 acres)	Recreational		54°10′31″N 101°23′30″W
Sand Lakes Provincial Park	Northern	1995		Wilderness		57.84222°N 98.53°W
Sasagiu Rapids Provincial Park	Northern	1974	99.6 ha (246 acres)	Recreational		55°8′55″N 98°27′9″W
Seton Provincial Park	Westman	1974		Recreational		49.9025°N 99.203611111111°W
South Atikaki Provincial Park	Eastman	1997		Natural		51.049444444444°N 95.336111111111°W
Springwater Provincial Park	Parkland	1964		Recreational		51.8583°N 100.58861°W
Spruce Woods Provincial Park	Westman	1964		Natural		49.7094°N 99.0972°W
St. Ambroise Beach Provincial Park	Central Plains	1961		Recreational		50.2758°N 98.0742°W
St. Malo Provincial Park	Eastman	1961		Recreational		49.319722222222°N 96.928333333333°W
St. Norbert Provincial Park	Central (Winnipeg)	1976				49.754722222222°N 97.142222222222°W
Stephenfield Provincial Park	Central Plains	1971		Recreational		49.521111111111°N 98.295833333333°W
Sturgeon Bay Provincial Park	Interlake	2015				51.803855°N 97.815792°W
Swan River Provincial Park	Parkland	1974		Recreational		52.1225°N 101.25222222222°W
Trappist Monastery Provincial Park	Central (Winnipeg)	2002		Heritage		49.7583°N 97.1564°W
Turtle Mountain Provincial Park	Westman	1961		Natural		49.05°N 100.25°W
Twin Lakes Provincial Park	Northern	1974	1.02 ha (2.5 acres)	Recreational		54°39′26″N 101°28′38″W
Upper Fort Garry Heritage Provincial Park	Central (Winnipeg)	2014				49.88751°N 97.13506°W
Wallace Lake Provincial Park	Eastman	1961		Recreational		51.00277°N 95.35555°W
Watchorn Provincial Park	Interlake	1962		Recreational		51.27833°N 98.56166°W
Wekusko Falls Provincial Park	Northern	1974	88.23 ha (218.0 acres)	Recreational		54°57′35″N 99°58′19″W
Whitefish Lake Provincial Park	Parkland	1974		Recreational		52.33638°N 101.58277°W
Whitemouth Falls Provincial Park	Eastman	1974		Recreational		50.11055°N 96.01944°W
Whiteshell Provincial Park	Eastman	1961		Natural		49.9167°N 95.3333°W
William Lake Provincial Park	Westman	1961		Recreational		49.041°N 99.973°W
Winnipeg Beach Provincial Park	Interlake	1968		Recreational		50.5003°N 96.9703°W
Woodridge Provincial Park	Eastman	1974		Recreational		49.28972°N 96.1475°W
Yellow Quill Provincial Park	Central Plains	1997		Recreational		49.95694°N 98.33194°W
Zed Lake Provincial Park	Northern	1961	12.07 ha (29.8 acres)	Recreational		56.91055°N 101.24194°W
