= Northern Manitoba =

Region of Manitoba, Canada

- Geographic region
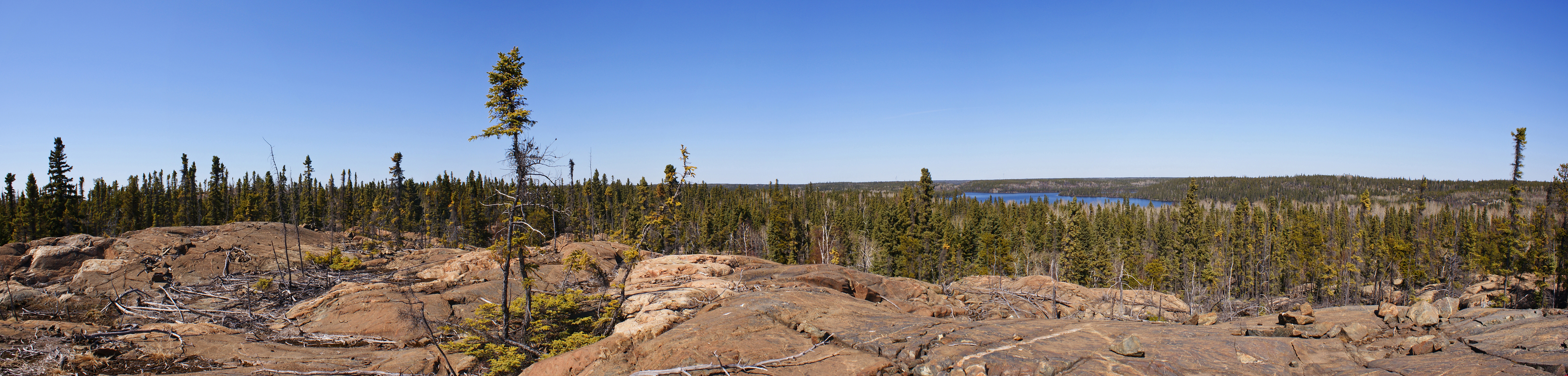
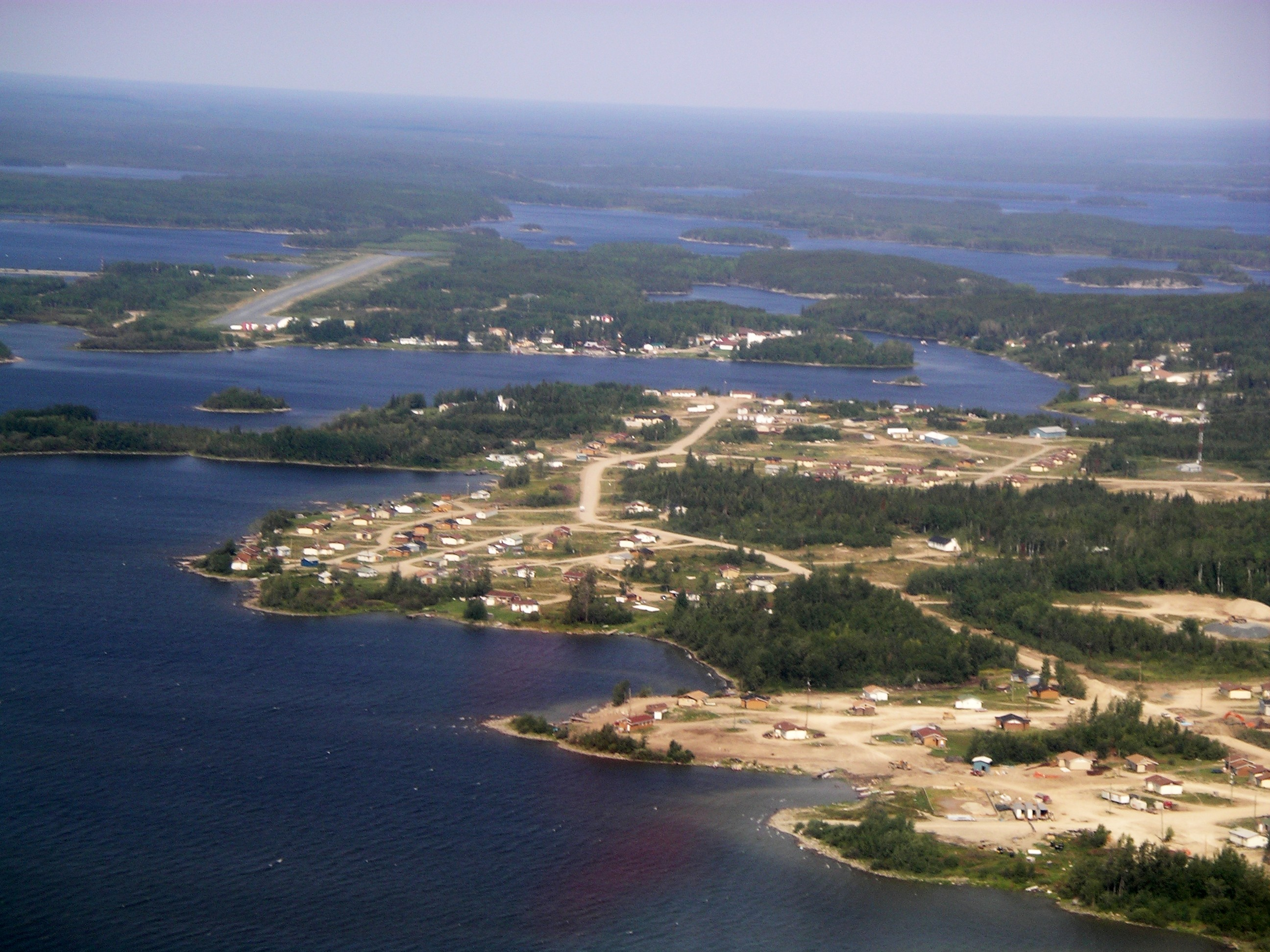
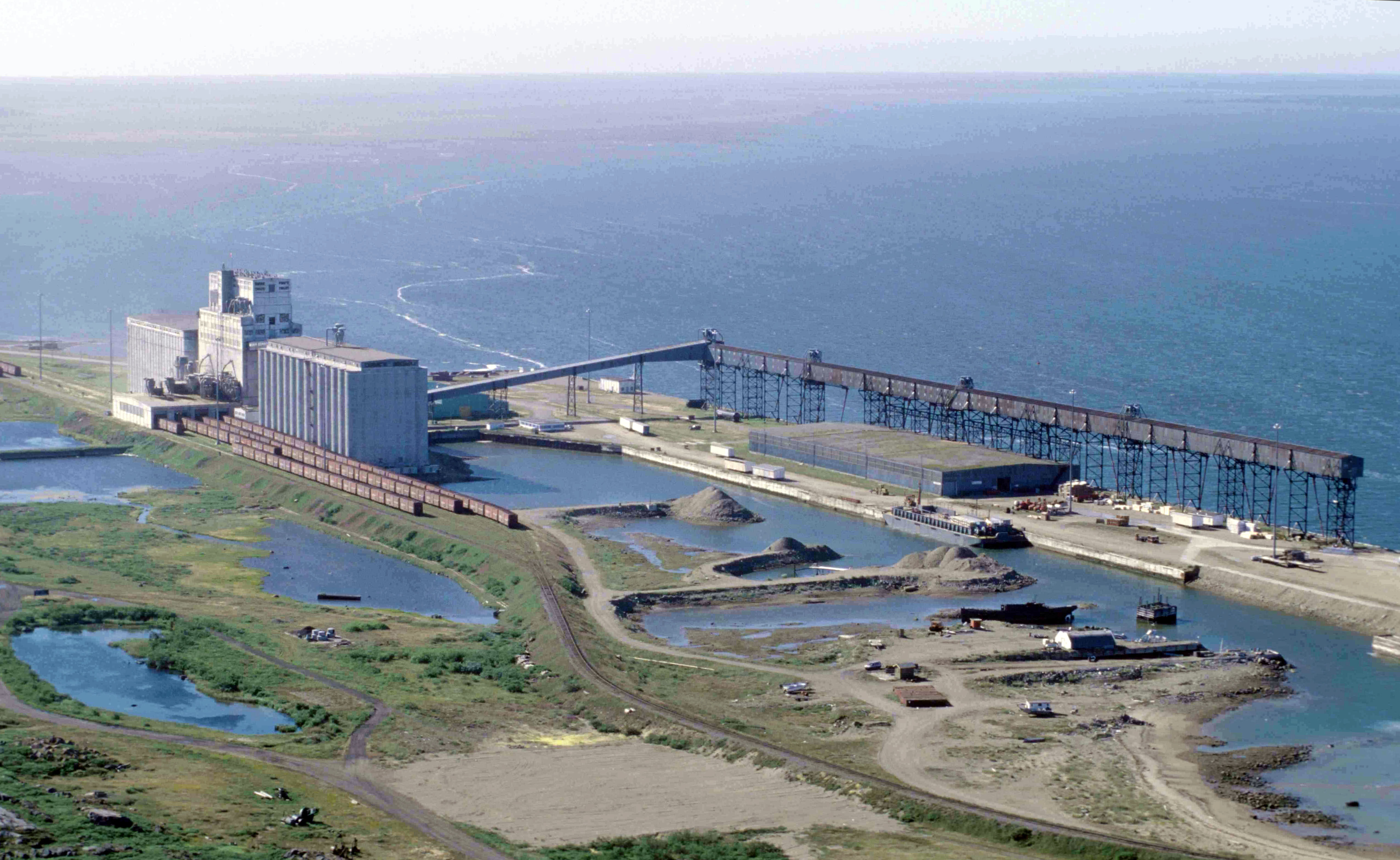
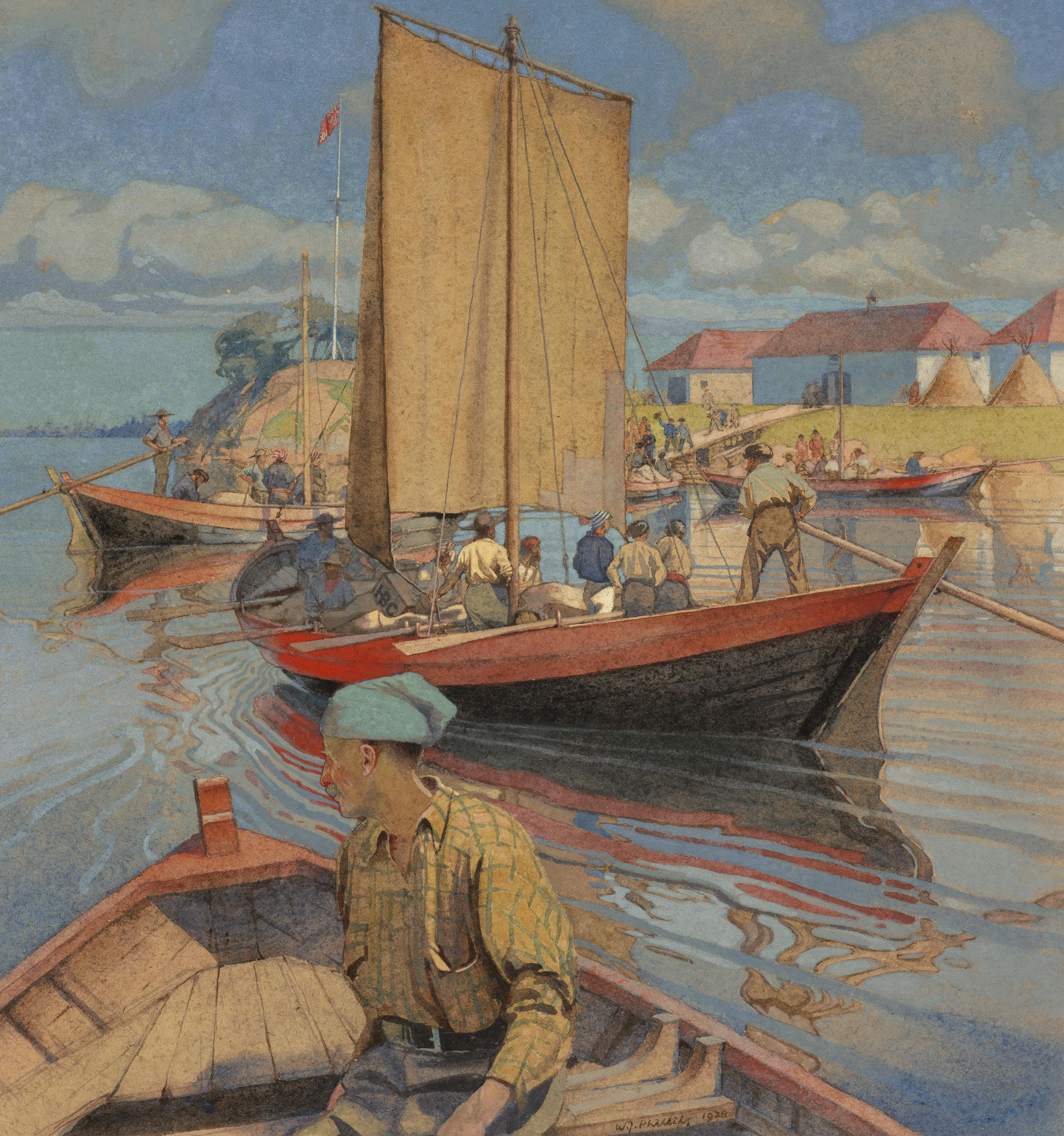
- Left-right from top: the Canadian Shield, a remote community, the Port of Churchill, York boats

- Common definitions of Northern Manitoba
- Country: Canada
- Province: Manitoba
- Largest population centres: Thompson; Flin Flon; The Pas; Norway House; Churchill

Northern Manitoba (also known as NorMan or Nor-Man) is a geographic and cultural region of the Canadian province of Manitoba. Manitoba originally encompassed only a small square around the Red River Colony, but it was extended north to the 60th parallel in 1912, thus acquiring a large northern region. The region's specific boundaries vary, as "northern" communities are considered to share certain social and geographic characteristics, regardless of latitude.

== Geography ==
There is no universally accepted definition of Northern Manitoba, but the most detailed description is provided by the Manitoba Indigenous and Northern Relations Department:

"Northern Manitoba" means all that part of Manitoba north of the northern boundary of Township 21 that is not included in

(a) a wildlife management area or refuge designated as such under The Wildlife Act;

(b) a provincial forest designated as such under The Forest Act;

(c) a provincial park designated as such under The Provincial Parks Act;

(d) a municipality or local government district; or

(e) any area prescribed by the Lieutenant Governor in Council as not being within northern Manitoba for the purposes of this Act.

— The Northern Affairs Act (2006)

For marketing purposes, Travel Manitoba considers Northern Manitoba to encompass everything north of the 53rd parallel. In contrast, the Look North economic development agency defines the North as consisting of Statistics Canada's Census Divisions 19, 21, 22, and 23. There is also a defined territory of responsibility for the Northern Regional Health Authority, which excludes the town of Churchill.

Northern Manitoba is mostly pristine wilderness, regardless of the exact boundaries used to define it. It is situated on the Canadian Shield and includes the province's Hudson Bay coastline. Forestry, mining and hydro-electric development are significant economic drivers with long-term consequences to the environment in the region. The region has a much higher proportion of Indigenous people than the rest of the province.

The vast unincorporated areas of Manitoba not within any rural municipality, largely in Northern Manitoba.

=== Climate ===
Manitoba's northern region is mostly within the subarctic climate zone (Köppen climate classification Dfc). It also has some Humid Continental (Koppen Dfb) areas in the south. This region features long and extremely cold winters and brief, warm summers with little precipitation. Overnight temperatures as low as −40 °C (−40 °F) occur on several days each winter.

=== Ecology ===
This region is covered by large extents of stunted Black Spruce dominant forest, with association of Tamarack. There are several mammals in the region including the Arctic fox, Beluga whale and Polar bear. The Polar bear has a significant denning area within the Wapusk National Park, from which annual bear migrations to Hudson Bay are made.

==== Protected areas ====
Northern Manitoba includes one national park (Wapusk National Park), a provincial forest (Cormorant Provincial Forest), several ecological reserves, and more than twenty provincial parks.

The provincial parks are as follows:

- Zed Lake Provincial Park and Burge Lake Provincial Park are located near the town of Lynn Lake.
- Caribou River Provincial Park 59.5636°N 96.6611°W
- Clearwater Lake Provincial Park 54.08305°N 101.078333°W
- Grass River Provincial Park 54.6664°N 100.831°W
- Little Limestone Lake Provincial Park 53°46′0″N 99°20′1″W
- North Steeprock Lake Provincial Park 52°35′58″N 101°20′59″W
- Nueltin Lake Provincial Park 59°37′57″N 99°34′42″W
- Numaykoos Lake Provincial Park 57°51′55″N 95°57′48″W
- Sand Lakes Provincial Park 57.84222°N 98.53°W
- Colvin Lake Provincial Park 59°41′2″N 101°33′40″W
- Paint Lake Provincial Park The park is 22,740 ha (56,200 acres) in size. It is located at 55°29′45″N 97°59′20″W
- Bakers Narrows Provincial Park The park is 145.12 ha (358.6 acres) in size. It is located at 54°40′16″N 101°40′30″W
- Bell Lake Provincial Park The park is 3.96 ha (9.8 acres) in size. It is located at 52°32′30″N 101°14′29″W
- Grand Rapids Provincial Park is located at 53°8′31″N 99°17′6″W
- Neso Lake Provincial Park The park is 1.33 ha (3.3 acres) in size. It is located at 54°39′26″N 101°32′49″W
- Overflowing River Provincial Park The park is 13.11 ha (32.4 acres) in size. It is located at 53°8′23″N 101°5′15″W
- Pisew Falls Provincial Park The park is 92.86 ha (229.5 acres) in size. It is located at 55°11′52″N 98°23′48″W
- Red Deer River Provincial Park The park is 1 ha (2.5 acres) in size. It is located at 52°53′28″N 101°1′32″W
- Rocky Lake Provincial Park The park is 23.94 ha (59.2 acres) in size. It is located at 54°10′31″N 101°23′30″W
- Sasagiu Rapids Provincial Park The park is 99.6 ha (246 acres) in size. It is located at 55°8′55″N 98°27′9″W
- Twin Lakes Provincial Park The park is 1.02 ha (2.5 acres) in size. It is located at 54°39′26″N 101°28′38″W
- Wekusko Falls Provincial Park The park is 88.23 ha (218.0 acres) in size. It is located at 54°57′35″N 99°58′19″W

== Economy ==
The major economic activities are mining and tourism.

== Demographics ==
The region is composed of four census divisions: 19 and 21–23. Its total population according to the 2016 Census of population was 89,637, 7.0% of Manitoba's total population. The largest municipality is the city of Thompson. Other major population centres include the city of Flin Flon and the town of The Pas. Indian reserves comprise more than 49% of the region's population. There are 54 reserves with a total population of 40,572. The largest of these are Norway House 17 and Peguis 1B.

=== Communities ===
The following communities are within the northern Manitoba area:

- Churchill
- Flin Flon
- Gillam
- Gods River
- Grand Rapids
- Granville Lake
- Ilford
- Leaf Rapids
- Lynn Lake
- Mystery Lake
- Snow Lake
- South Indian Lake
- The Pas
- Thompson

== Infrastructure ==
Northern Manitoba is accessed by two Provincial Trunk Highways: PTH 10 to Flin Flon and PTH 6 to Thompson, as well as a network of smaller roads. These are extended in the winter by an additional network of winter roads.

Northern Manitoba is served by a single rail line running north from Winnipeg, via eastern Saskatchewan. The Canadian National Railway operates the line as far as The Pas. At The Pas, the line splits into branches. The Keewatin Railway Company owns the branch connecting The Pas to Pukatawagan, while the Hudson Bay Railway operates a cargo-only branch to Flin Flon and a mixed-use branch connecting to Churchill. All rail service between The Pas and Churchill was suspended from 2017 to 2018 due to a washout of tracks north of Amery. Via Rail passenger service operates on these lines as part of its Winnipeg–Churchill service.

Air transport provides access to many northern communities with 58 airfields in the region. Calm Air and Perimeter Aviation provide scheduled passenger service into larger northern communities. Chartered bush planes land on lakes when airfields are not available.

== See also ==
- First Nations in the Northern Region of Manitoba
- Nelson River Hydroelectric Project
- Southern Manitoba
