= Colvin Lake =

Colvin Lake may refer to:

- Colvin Lake (Michigan), a lake in the United States
- Colvin Lake Provincial Park, a park in Canada
