= Elk Island =

Elk Island may refer to:

- Elk Island (electoral district), a federal electoral district in the province of Alberta, Canada
- Elk Island National Park, Alberta, Canada
- Elk Island Provincial Park, Manitoba, Canada
- Elk Island (Richland County, Montana), an island in the Yellowstone River
- Elk Island (Flathead County, Montana), an island in Hungry Horse Reservoir
- A fictional island used in cartoon television series Hey Arnold! and Arthur.
