= Lake Winnipeg =

Large glacial lake in Manitoba, Canada

- Ojibwe: Weenipagamiksaguygun
- Location of the lake in Manitoba Lake Winnipeg (Canada)

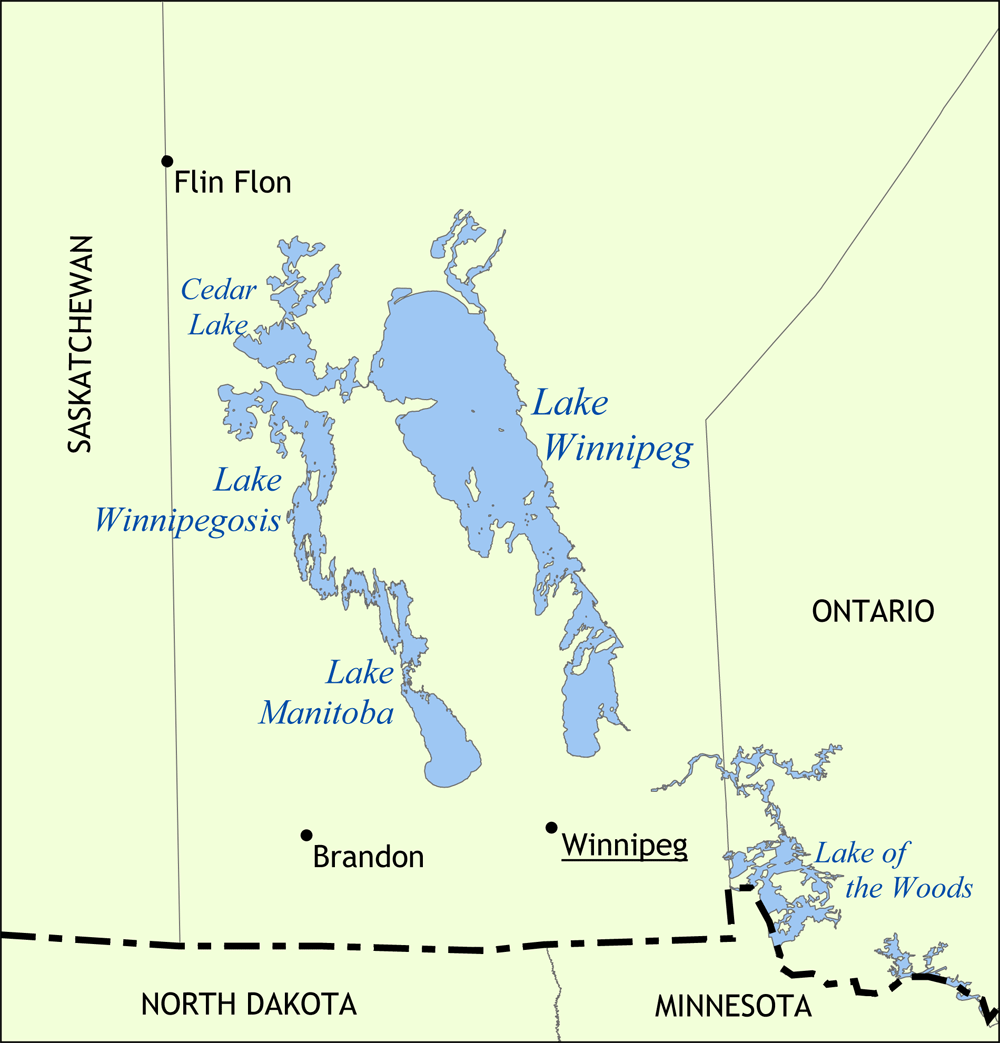
- Map
- Location: Manitoba, Canada
- Coordinates: 52°7′N 97°15′W
- Lake type: Glacial
- Primary inflows: Winnipeg River, Saskatchewan River, Red River
- Primary outflows: Nelson River
- Catchment area: 982,900 km^{2} (379,500 sq mi)
- Basin countries: Canada and the United States
- Max. length: 416 km (258 mi)
- Max. width: 100 km (60 mi) (N Basin); 40 km (20 mi) (S Basin)
- Surface area: 24,514 km^{2} (9,465 sq mi)
- Average depth: 12 m (39 ft)
- Max. depth: 36 m (118 ft)
- Water volume: 294 km^{3} (71 cu mi)
- Residence time: 3.5 years
- Shore length^{1}: 1,858 km (1,155 mi)
- Surface elevation: 217 m (712 ft)
- Settlements: Gimli
- ^{1} Shore length is not a well-defined measure.

Lake Winnipeg is a 24,514-square-kilometre (9,465-square-mile) lake in North America, in the Canadian province of Manitoba. Its southern end is about 55 kilometres (34 miles) north of the namesake city, Winnipeg. It is the 12th largest lake on Earth, Canada's sixth-largest freshwater lake, and the third-largest freshwater lake contained entirely within Canada. It is relatively shallow, with a mean depth of 12 metres [39 feet]. Its deepest section is a narrow 36-metre (118-foot) deep channel between the northern and southern basins.

The lake's east side has pristine boreal forests and rivers that were inscribed in 2018 as Pimachiowin Aki, a UNESCO World Heritage Site. The lake is 416 km (258 mi) from north to south, with remote sandy beaches, large limestone cliffs, and many bat caves in some areas. Manitoba Hydro uses the lake as one of the largest reservoirs in the world. There are many islands, most of them undeveloped.

== Hydrography ==
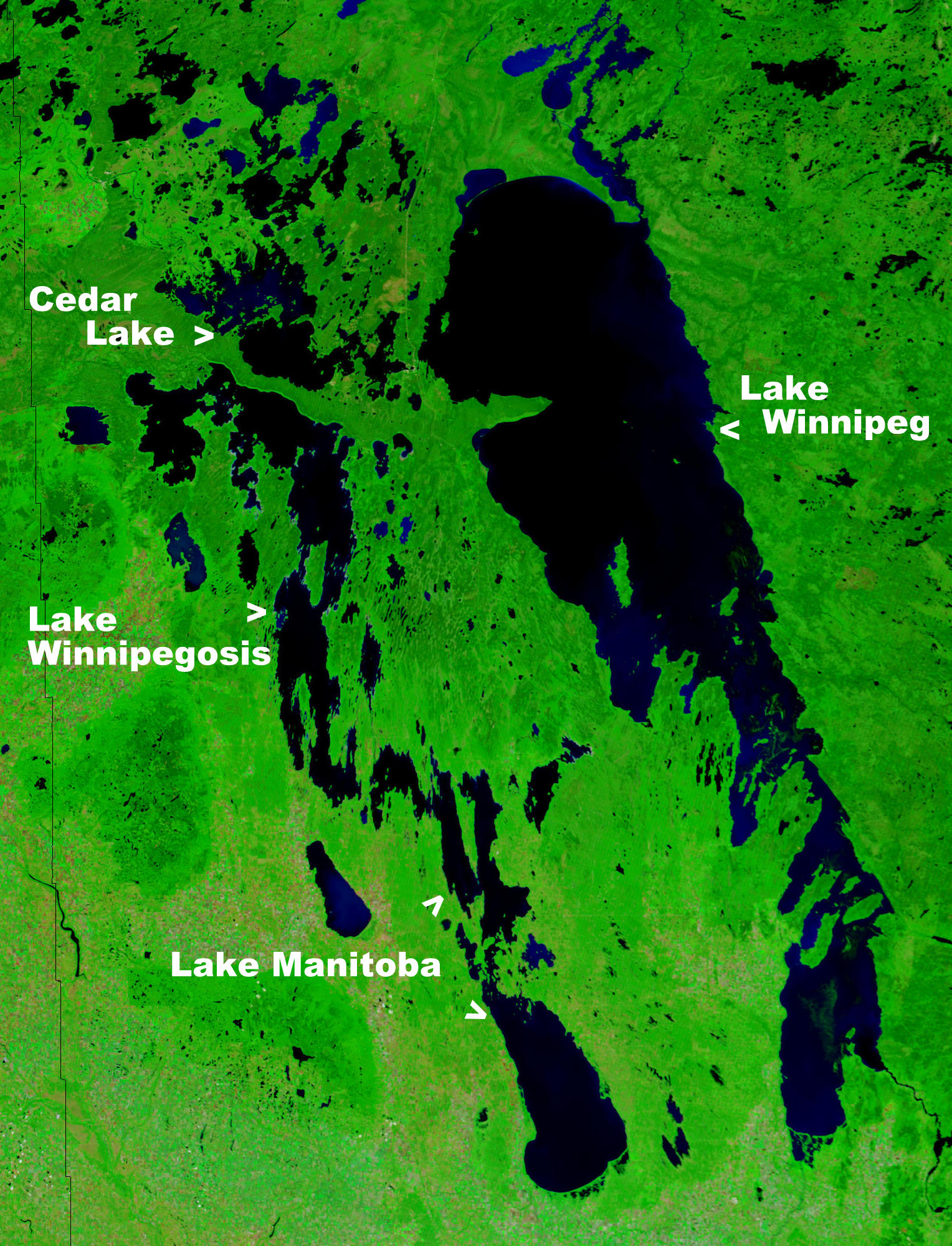
NASA false-colour image of Lake Winnipeg

Lake Winnipeg has the largest watershed of any lake in Canada, receiving water from four provinces (Alberta, Saskatchewan, Ontario and Manitoba) and four U.S. states: (North Dakota and Minnesota via tributaries of the Red River, South Dakota via rivers draining into Lake Traverse, and Montana via tributaries of the Oldman River). The lake's watershed measures about 982,900 square kilometres (379,500 sq mi).

Lake Winnipeg drains northward into the Nelson River at an average annual rate of 2,066 cubic metres per second (72,960 cu ft/s) and forms part of the Hudson Bay watershed, which is one of the largest drainage basins in the world. This watershed area was known as Rupert's Land when the Hudson's Bay Company was chartered in 1670.

=== Tributaries ===
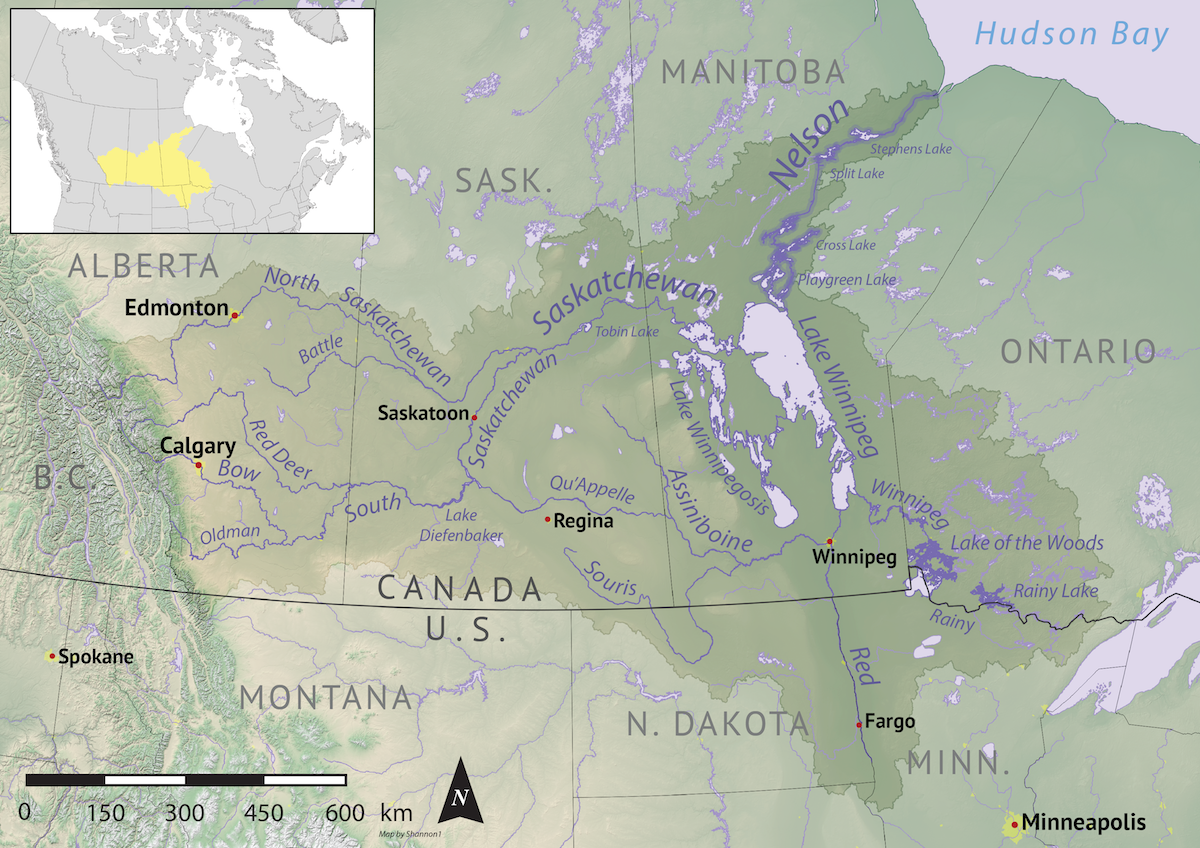
Nelson River drainage basin

The Saskatchewan River flows in from the west through Cedar Lake, the Red River (including Assiniboine River) flows in from the south, and the Winnipeg River (draining Lake of the Woods, Rainy River and Rainy Lake) enters from the southeast. The Dauphin River enters from the west, draining Lake Manitoba and Lake Winnipegosis. The Bloodvein River, Berens River, Poplar River and the Manigotagan River flow in from the eastern side of the lake which is within the Canadian Shield.

Other tributaries of Lake Winnipeg (clockwise from the south end) include Meleb Drain (drainage canal), Drunken River, Icelandic River, Washow Bay Creek, Sugar Creek, Beaver Creek, Mill Creek, Moose Creek, Fisher River, Jackhead River, Kinwow Bay Creek, Jackpine Creek, Mantagao River, Solomons Creek, Jumping Creek, Warpath River, South Two Rivers, North Two Rivers, South Twin Creek, North Twin Creek, Saskachaywiak Creek, Eating Point Creek, Woody Point Creeks, Muskwa Creek, Buffalo Creek, Fiddler Creek, Sturgeon Creek, Hungry River, Cypress Creek, William River, Bélanger River, Mukutawa River, Crane Creek, Kapawekapuk Creek, Marchand Creek, Leaf River, Pigeon River, Taskapekawe Creek, Bradbury River, Petopeko Creek, Loon Creek, Sanders Creek, Rice River, Wanipigow River, Barrie Creek, Mutch Creek, Sandy River, Black River, Sandy Creek, Catfish Creek, Jackfish Creek, Marais Creek, Brokenhead River and Devils Creek.

== Geology ==
Lake Winnipeg and Lake Manitoba are remnants of prehistoric Glacial Lake Agassiz, although there is evidence of a desiccated south basin of Lake Winnipeg approximately 4,000 years ago. The area between the lakes is called the Interlake Region, and the whole region is called the Manitoba Lowlands.

== Natural history ==
=== Fish ===
The varying habitats found within the lake support a large number of fish species, more than any other lake in Canada west of the Great Lakes. Sixty of seventy-nine native species found in Manitoba are present in the lake. Families represented include lampreys (Petromyzontidae), sturgeon (Acipenseridae), mooneyes (Hiodontidae), minnows (Cyprinidae), suckers (Catostomidae), catfish (Ictaluridae), pike (Esocidae), trout and whitefish (Salmonidae), troutperch (Percopsidae), codfish (Gadidae), sticklebacks (Gasterosteidae), sculpins (Cottidae), sunfish (Centrarchidae), perch (Percidae), and drum (Sciaenidae).

Two fish species present in the lake are considered to be at risk, the shortjaw cisco and the bigmouth buffalo.

Rainbow trout and brown trout are stocked in Manitoba waters by provincial fisheries as part of a put and take program to support angling opportunities. Neither species is able to sustain itself independently in Manitoba. Smallmouth bass was first recorded from the lake in 2002, indicating populations introduced elsewhere in the watershed are now present in the lake. White bass were first recorded from the lake in 1963, ten years after being introduced into Lake Ashtabula in North Dakota. Common carp were introduced to the lake through the Red River of the North and are firmly established.

=== Birds ===
Lake Winnipeg provides feeding and nesting sites for a wide variety of birds associated with water during the summer months.

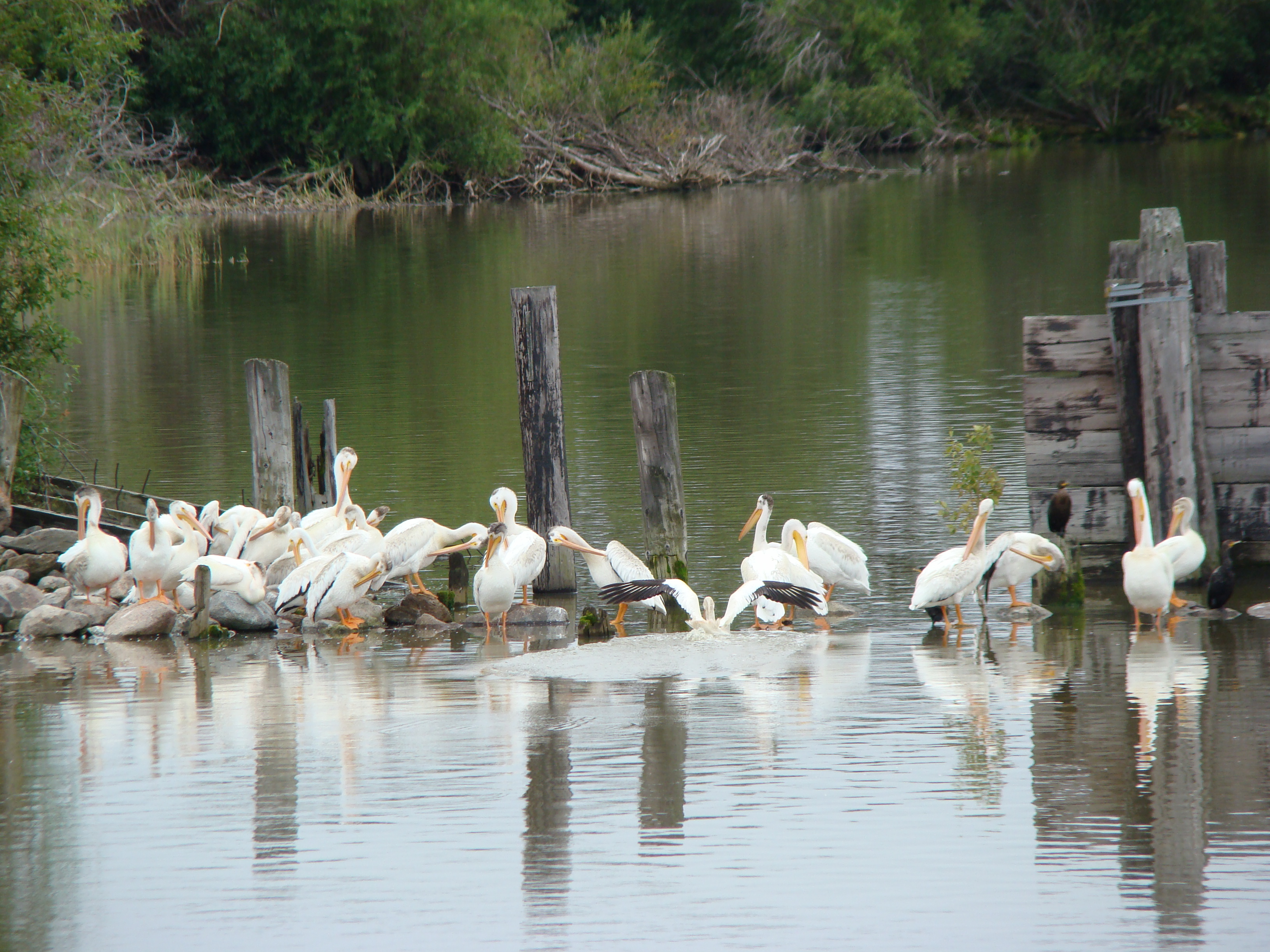
American white pelicans loaf near shore, Hecla-Grindstone Provincial Park

Isolated, uninhabited islands provide nesting sites for colonial nesting birds including pelicans, gulls and terns. Large marshes, shores and shallows allow these birds to successfully feed themselves and their young. Pipestone Rocks are considered a globally significant site for American white pelicans. In 1998, an estimated 3.7% of the world's population of this bird at the time were counted nesting on the rocky outcrops. The same site is significant within North America for the numbers of colonial waterbirds using the area, especially common terns. Other globally significant nesting areas are found at Gull Island and Sandhill Island, Little George Island and Louis Island. Birds nesting at these sites include common and Caspian terns, herring gulls, ring-billed gulls, double-crested cormorants and greater scaups.

Lake Winnipeg has two sites considered globally important in the fall migration. Large populations of waterfowl and shorebirds use the sand bars east of Riverton as a staging area for fall migration. The Netley-Libau Marsh, where the Red River enters Lake Winnipeg, is used by geese, ducks and swallows to gather for the southward migration.

Piping plovers, an endangered species of shorebird, are found in several locations around the lake. The Gull Bay Spits, south of the town of Grand Rapids, are considered nationally significant nesting sites for this species.

=== Protected areas ===
- Beaver Creek Provincial Park
- Camp Morton Provincial Park
- Elk Island Provincial Park
- Fisher Bay Provincial Park
- Grand Beach Provincial Park
- Hecla-Grindstone Provincial Park
- Hnausa Beach Provincial Park
- Kinwow Provincial Park
- Patricia Beach Provincial Park
- Sturgeon Bay Provincial Park
- Winnipeg Beach Provincial Park

=== Environmental issues ===
Lake Winnipeg is suffering from many environmental issues such as an explosion in the population of cyanobacteria, caused by excessive amounts of phosphorus seeping into the lake. The phosphorus levels are approaching a point that could be dangerous for human health.

The Global Nature Fund declared Lake Winnipeg as the "threatened lake of the year" in 2013.

In 2015, there was a major uptick of zebra mussels in Lake Winnipeg, the reduction of which is next to impossible because of a lack of natural predators in the lake. The mussels are devastating to the ecological opportunities of the lake.

== History ==
Lake Winnipeg on a hot day

It is believed Henry Kelsey was the first European to see the lake, in 1690. He adopted the Cree language name for the lake: wīnipēk (ᐐᓂᐯᐠ), meaning "muddy waters". La Vérendrye referred to the lake as Ouinipigon when he built the first forts in the area in the 1730s. Later, the Red River Colony to its south took the lake's name for Winnipeg, the capital of Manitoba.

Lake Winnipeg lies along one of the oldest trading routes in North America to have flown the British flag. For several centuries, furs were traded along this route between York Factory on Hudson Bay (which was the long-time headquarters for the Hudson's Bay Company) over Lake Winnipeg and the Red River Trails to the confluence of the Minnesota and Mississippi Rivers at Saint Paul, Minnesota. This was a strategic trading route for the First British Empire. With the establishment of the Second British Empire after Britain's loss of the Thirteen Colonies, a significant increase in trade occurred over Lake Winnipeg between Rupert's Land and the United States.

In 2016 the Indigenous place name Weenipagamiksaguygun was approved by the Geographical Names Board of Canada. It is an Anishinaabe name for the lake as used by the Poplar River First Nation.

== Economy ==
=== Transportation ===
Because of its length, the Lake Winnipeg water system and the lake was an important transportation route in the province before the railways reached Manitoba. It continued to be a major transportation route even after the railways reached the province. In addition to aboriginal canoes and York boats, several steamboats plied the lake, including Anson Northup, City of Selkirk, Colvile, Keenora, Premier, Princess, Winnitoba, Wolverine and most recently the diesel-powered MS Lord Selkirk II passenger cruise ship.

=== Communities ===
Communities on the lake include Grand Marais, Lester Beach, Riverton, Gimli, Winnipeg Beach, Victoria Beach, Hillside Beach, Pine Falls, Manigotagan, Berens River, Bloodvein, Sandy Hook, Albert Beach, Hecla Village and Grand Rapids. A number of pleasure beaches are found on the southern end of the lake, which are popular in the summer, attracting many visitors from Winnipeg, approximately 80 km south.

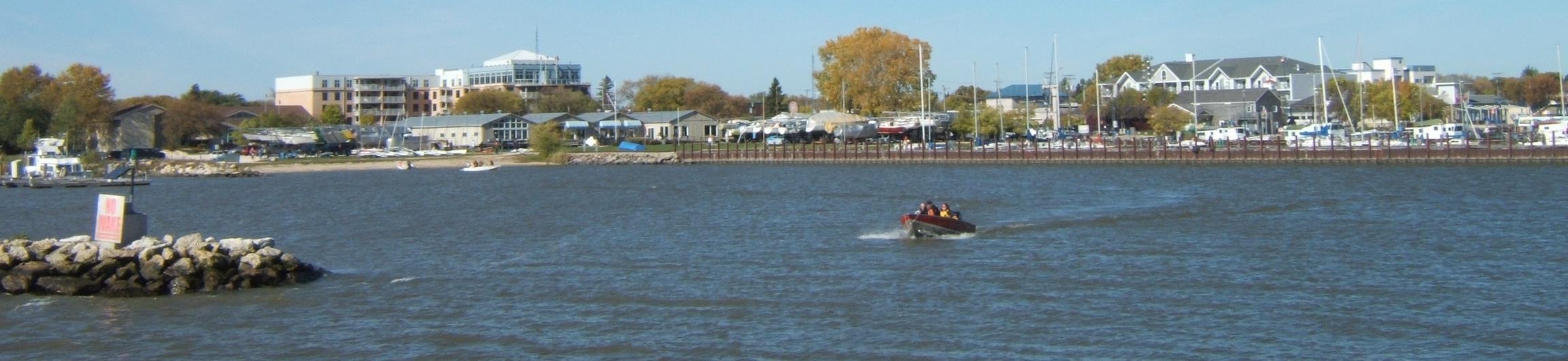
Gimli on Lake Winnipeg.

=== Recreational angling ===
Lake Winnipeg is widely recognized as a premier angling destination, attracting anglers from around the globe "targeting it's abundant walleye, sauger and channel catfish populations" along with northern pike, yellow perch, gold eye, mooneye. Angling efforts vary from casting lines from shore, trolling its depths or dropping a line through the ice in search of a Master Angler Walleye, considered to be a Walleye caught in Manitoba by hook and line measuring over 71 centimetres (28 in) (28").

As of 2010 "over 50,000 anglers fished more than 389,000 days on the Red River and Lake Winnipeg combined" and "contribute an estimated $20,000,000 to $32,000,000 annually. and as of 2018 that had grown to nearly 100,000 adult anglers fishing Lake Winnipeg and its southern tributaries, adding $102,000,000 to the provincial GDP supporting some 1,500 jobs.

Many licensed outfitters offer a wide array of services from guided fishing trips to equipment rentals and accommodations in service of recreational anglers.

Recent introduction of new angling regulations aim to ensure the sustainability of the fishery, with an extended season closure during the spring walleye spawn, reduced possession limits, and an end to the retention of trophy sized fish.

=== Commercial fisheries ===
Lake Winnipeg has important commercial fisheries. It contributes 57% of the province's total production and 75% of the landed value of the harvest in Manitoba. Average annual landings from Lake Winnipeg from 2009 to 2015 were 6,539,739 kg, with an average value of $15,357,975. The lake was once the main source of goldeye in Canada, which is why the fish is sometimes called Winnipeg goldeye. Walleye and whitefish together account for over 90 percent of its commercial fishing.

== See also ==
- List of Islands of Lake Winnipeg
- List of lakes of Manitoba

== General and cited references ==
- Canadian Action Party (2006). Canadian action party release Devils Lake ruling
- Casey, A. (November/December 2006). "Forgotten lake", Canadian Geographic, Vol. 126, Issue 6, pp. 62–78
- Chliboyko, J. (November/December 2003). "Trouble flows north", Canadian Geographic, Vol. 123, Issue 6, p. 23
- "Devil down south" (16 July 2005), The Economist, Vol. 376, Issue 8435,. p. 34
- GreenPeace, "Algae bloom on Lake Winnipeg" (26 May 2008). Retrieved 2 February 2009
- Daily Commercial News and Construction Record, "Ottawa asked to help block water diversion project: Devils Lake outlet recommended by U.S. Army Corps of Engineers" (20 October 2003), Vol. 76, Issue 198,. p. 3
- Sexton, B. (2006) "Wastes control: Manitoba demands more scrutiny of North Dakota's water diversion scheme", Outdoor Canada, Vol. 34, Issue 1, p. 32
- Warrington, Dr. P. (6 November 2001) "Aquatic pathogens: cyanophytes "
- Welch, M. A. (19 August 2008) "Winnipeg's algae invasion was forewarned more than 30 years ago", The Canadian Press
- Macleans (14 June 2004) "What ails Lake Winnipeg" Vol. 117, Issue 24, p. 38.
- Wilderness Committee (2008) "Turning the tide on Lake Winnipeg and our health"
- Canadian Geographical Names Database (2016) "Place names - Weenipagamiksaguygun"
