= Grass River (Manitoba) =

River in Manitoba, Canada

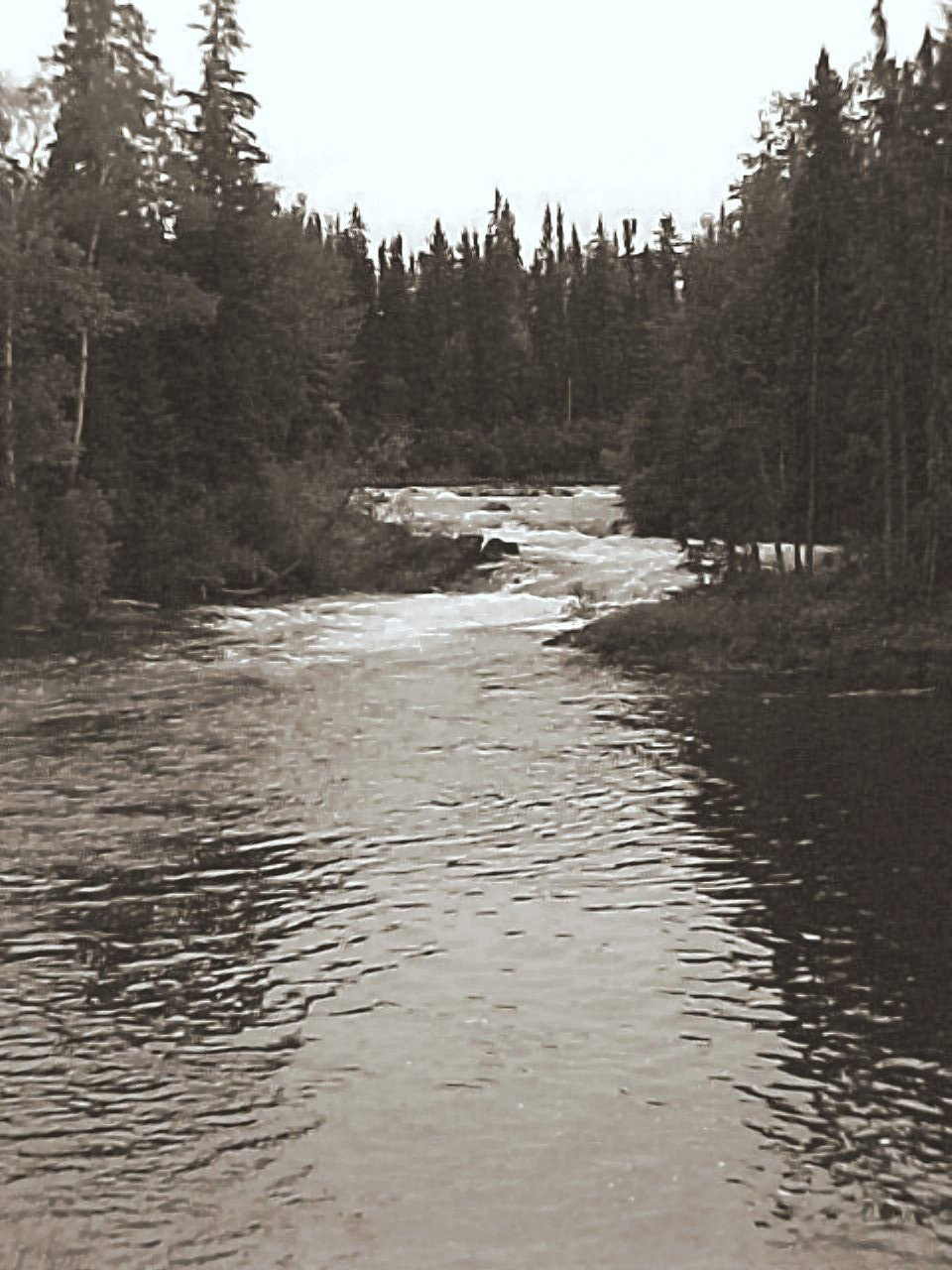
- Grass River

- Location of the mouth of the Grass River in Manitoba
- Native name: Muskuskow' Sipi (Cree)

Location
- Country: Canada
- Province: Manitoba
- Region: Northern Region
- City: Cranberry Portage, Kelsey

Physical characteristics
- Source: Cranberry Lakes
  - coordinates: 54°43′16″N 101°0′3″W
  - elevation: 295 m (968 ft)
- Mouth: Nelson River
  - coordinates: 56°02′39″N 96°34′22″W
  - elevation: 168 m (551 ft)
- Length: 599 km (372 mi)
- Basin size: 15,400 km^{2} (5,900 sq mi)
- Discharge
  - average: 100 m^{3}/s (3,500 cu ft/s)
  - minimum: 10 m^{3}/s (350 cu ft/s)
  - maximum: 250 m^{3}/s (8,800 cu ft/s)

Basin features
- River system: Hudson Bay drainage basin
- Tributaries
  - left: Isbister Creek
  - right: Metishto River, Wintering River, Pikwitonei River

The Grass River is a historically important waterway in the Hudson Bay drainage basin in the Northern Region of Manitoba, Canada. It begins at the Cranberry Lakes approximately 27 kilometres (17 mi) east of Cranberry Portage and runs northeast 500 kilometres (310 mi) to its mouth on the Nelson River. The river was a critical route for earlier European explorers and was part of the "Upper Tract" of the fur trade into Canadian interior.

== Route ==
The headwaters of the Grass River are in Third Cranberry Lake, approximately 27 kilometres (17 mi) east of Cranberry Portage. It then flows north to Elbow Lake, and turns sharply south to Iskwasum Lake after which it continues easterly to Reed Lake. This portion of the river is within Grass River Provincial Park. After Reed Lake, the river enters Tramping Lake, followed by the Wekusko Falls, Wekusko Lake and eastwards to Setting Lake. The river then passes Sasagiu Rapids Provincial Park, and Pisew Falls Provincial Wayside Park. It then enters Paint Lake and the Paint Lake Provincial Park. Continuing in a northeast direction, the Grass River passes through several remote lakes before its confluence with the Nelson River near Kelsey, Manitoba.

The river runs for 599 kilometres (372 mi), and drains a watershed of 15,400 square kilometres (5,900 mi^{2}).

== Description ==
The remote river flows through the Churchill River Upland portion of the Midwestern Canadian Shield forests and is surrounded by mixed forest with stands of black spruce, white spruce, jack pine, and trembling aspen. The shoreline is characterized by steeply sloping irregular rock ridges and poorly drained areas of muskeg. Typical of the Canadian Shield, the river runs through rolling hilly terrain with abundant glacially scoured rock outcrops.

Bird species include raven, common loon, spruce grouse, bald eagle and hawk owl. The Grass River area is largely pristine and home to moose, black bear, lynx, wolf, and beaver. There are also migrating herds of woodland caribou along the river's length.

Many portions of the river are not easily accessible, but there is some trapping, hunting, and recreational fishing activity. The Grass River basin contains burbot, lake whitefish, northern pike, sucker, walleye and yellow perch.

== History ==
The Grass River was originally inhabited by people of the Shield Archaic tradition who migrated from the present-day Northwest Territories 5,000 years ago. The many petrographs located along the river date to this period. Approximately 2,000 years ago, pottery was introduced to the region and the Woodland Cree emerged as the dominant culture in the area . In the 1700s, the river became an important route for Cree hunters travelling to York Factory at Hudson Bay to trade their furs.

The first recorded Europeans to travel the Grass River were the Hudson's Bay Company fur traders and explorers Joseph Smith and Isaac Batt. In 1763, from York Factory they travelled up the Grass River to Cranberry Portage and then over to Lake Athapapuskow and down into the Saskatchewan River system. Smith died on the return journey. In 1774, explorer Samuel Hearne paddled up the Grass River to establish Cumberland House. In the summer of 1794, surveyor and explorer David Thompson travelled up the Grass River for the first of many times in his career mapping the interior of North America. Several fur trading posts were established along the river, most notably at Reed Lake House (1794) and Cranberry Lake (1804). In the early 20th century there was a mining boom, which saw further exploration by prospectors and ultimately several mining operations.

The course of the river was first noted (crudely) in a 1760 map obtained by Moses Norton, the Factor at Churchill Fort from several Indian traders. The name "Grass River" was first documented on Samuel Hearne's map of 1776. In 1876 geologist Robert Bell surveyed the lower portions of the river, but it was not until 1896 when explorer Joseph Tyrell completed the first survey of its entire length. Tyrell recorded that the Cree name for the river was Muskuskow' Sipi, meaning "Grassy River".

== Canoe route ==
The Grass River is a popular wilderness canoe route due to its pristine state, Indigenous rock paintings, scenic waterfalls, and sport fishing. A trip down the full length of the river can take up to three weeks, but most canoeists travel shorter sections such as the Cranberry Portage to Split Lake route. The difficulty rating is intermediate, with moderate portaging and advanced lake travel.

== See also ==
- List of rivers of Manitoba
- Kwasitchewan Falls
