= List of Islands of Lake Winnipeg =

Lake Winnipeg has many islands:

- Adams Island
- Bakers Island
- Bannock Island
- Berens Island
- Berry Island
- Big Sturgeon Island
- Black Island (part of Hecla-Grindstone Provincial Park)
- Black Fox Island
- Birch Islands
- Burnt Island
- Burton Island
- Cairine Island (part of Hecla-Grindstone Provincial Park)
- Canoe Pass Island
- Chief Island
- Cochrane Island
- Commissioner Island
- Cox Island
- Deer Island (part of Hecla-Grindstone Provincial Park])
- Denetts Island
- Devil's Island
- Dog Island
- Eagle Island
- Egg Islands
- Elk Island
- Floating Island
- George Island
- Goldeye Island
- Goose Island (part of Hecla-Grindstone Provincial Park)
- Gull Island
- Hecla Island (Lake Winnipeg) (part of Hecla-Grindstone Provincial Park)
- Horse Island (Lake Winnipeg)
- Horseshoe Island
- Inner Sturgeon Island
- Jackhead Island
- Johns Island
- Kasakeemeemisekak Islands (part of Hecla-Grindstone Provincial Park)
- Little Eagle Island
- Little George Island
- Little Moose Island
- Little Punk Island (part of Hecla-Grindstone Provincial Park)
- Little Sturgeon Island
- Little Tamarack Island
- Little Willow Island
- Long Island
- Matheson Island
- McLeods Island
- Moose Island
- North Sandhill Island
- Nut Island
- Pelican Island
- Plunkett Island
- Pony Island
- Punk Island (part of Hecla-Grindstone Provincial Park)
- Reindeer Island
- Round Island
- Sandhill Island
- Sandy Islands
  - Big Sandy Island
  - Cannibal Island (Lake Winnipeg)
  - Little Sandy Island
- Shoal Islands
- Spider Islands
- St. Martin Islands
- Tamarack Island
- Tree Island
- Twin Islands
