= Kwasitchewan Falls =

Waterfall in Manitoba, Canada

Coordinates: 55.2653°N 98.2898°W

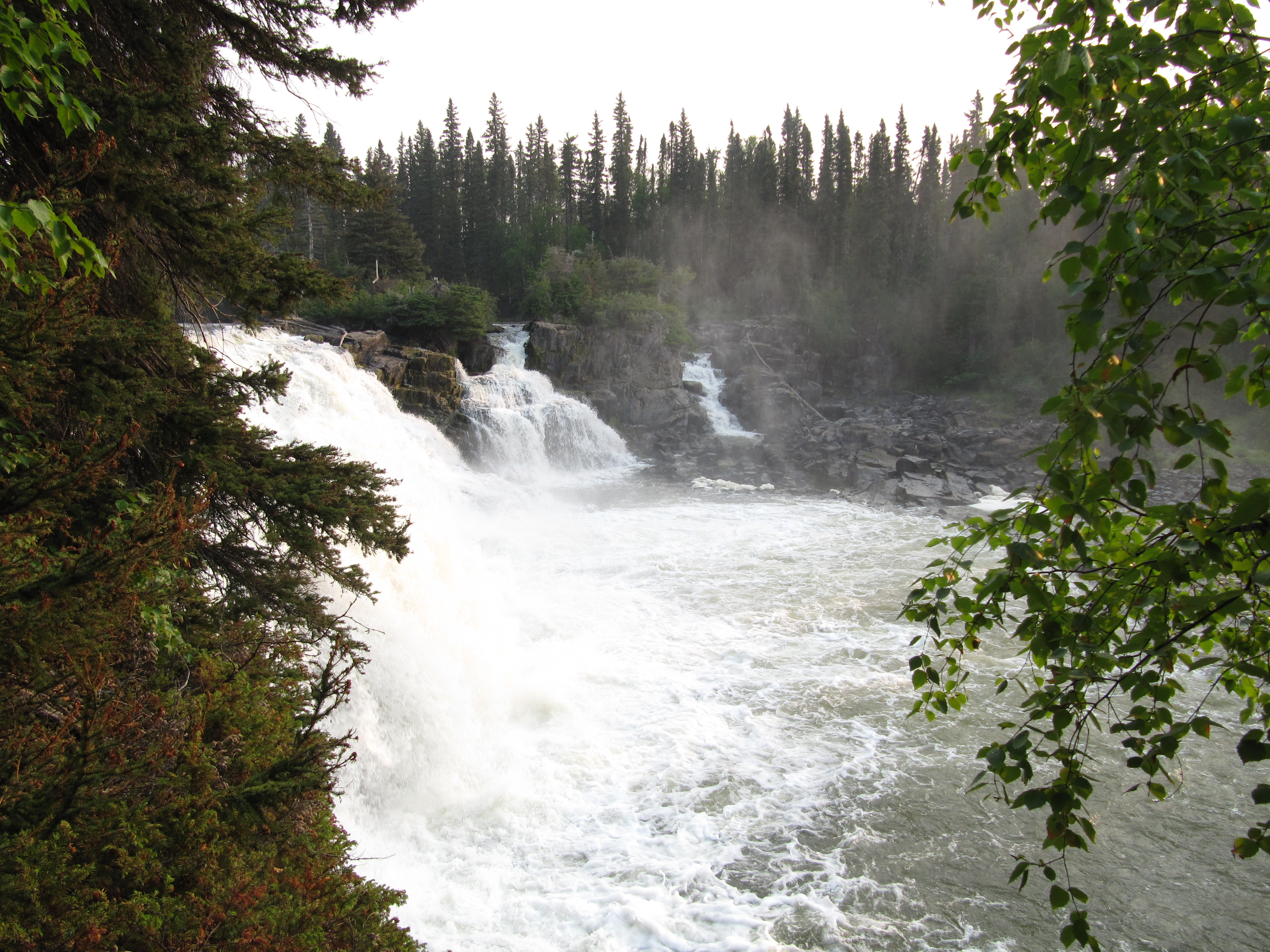
- Interactive map of Kwasitchewan Falls
- Location: Pisew Falls Provincial Park, Manitoba, Canada
- Elevation: 212 m (696 ft)
- Total height: 14 m (46 ft)

Pisew Falls is a waterfall in northern Manitoba, Canada, and the highest waterfall in the province, at 14 metres (46 ft) high. It is located in Pisew Falls Provincial Park and is a 32-kilometre (20 mi) return hike from Pisew Falls, the namesake of the park and the second-highest waterfall in the province. The falls are located on the Grass River and were historically a part of the fur traders' route to the interior of Western Canada via the Saskatchewan River basin, guided by the indigenous peoples of the area.

The name is said to be a transliteration of the Cree term for "glistening water," referring to the bright colouration created by the water at the falls.

== Geology ==
The falls are found in the geologic region known as the Trans-Hudson orogen, an area of raised crust stretching across a large part of the greater Grass River watershed. Due to a combination of erosion and natural processes, the Kwasitchewan Falls expose a large part of rock from this event, and from periods as far back as the Precambrian, making this area geologically notable.

== See also ==
- List of waterfalls
- List of waterfalls in Canada
