= Caribou River Provincial Park =

Provincial park in Manitoba, Canada

- IUCN category Ib (wilderness area)
- Location within Manitoba
- Interactive map of Caribou River Provincial Park
- Location: Manitoba, Canada
- Nearest town: Churchill, Manitoba
- Coordinates: 59°33′49″N 96°39′40″W
- Area: 7,640 km^{2} (2,950 sq mi)
- Established: 1995
- Governing body: Government of Manitoba

Caribou River Provincial Wilderness Park is a provincial park in extreme north-central Manitoba, Canada. It is the northernmost provincial park in Manitoba, and borders the southern Nunavut border. It is known for its remote backcountry camping experience.

The park is 7,640 square kilometres (2,950 sq mi) in size, and was designated a provincial park by the Government of Manitoba in 1995.

The park is considered to be a Class Ib protected area under the IUCN protected area management categories. It protects an area of the Taiga Shield Ecozone (CEC), including boreal forest, rivers and lakes, and low-lying wetlands forming extensive peatlands (bogs and fens). The park has a fairly rolling terrain with many rocky outcrops. Glacial till has been shaped into a mosaic of ridges and eskers, sinuous, rounded ridges deposited by glaciation.

The park's remote location and vast wilderness provide for backcountry hiking, canoeing, and fishing.

== See also ==
- List of protected areas of Manitoba
- List of Manitoba parks
