= Patricia Beach Provincial Park =

Provincial park in Manitoba, Canada

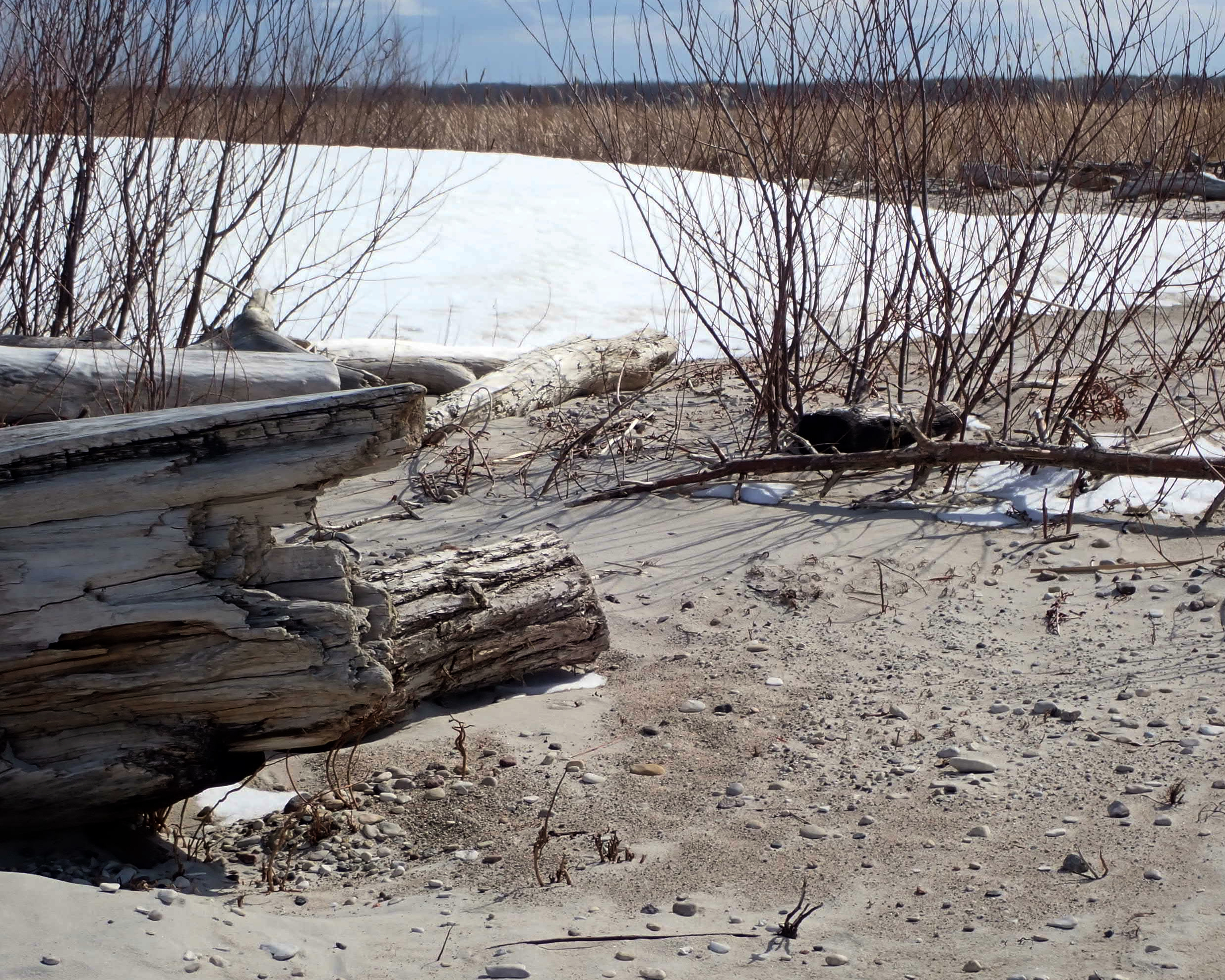
- Snowdrift on the beach at Patricia Beach Provincial Park, March 27, 2021

- Location within Manitoba
- Interactive map of Patricia Beach Provincial Park
- Location: Manitoba, Canada
- Nearest city: Winnipeg, Manitoba
- Coordinates: 50°25′37″N 96°36′22″W
- Area: 54.42 ha (134.5 acres)
- Established: 1961
- Governing body: Government of Manitoba

Patricia Beach Provincial Park is a provincial park on the south-east shore of Balsam Bay on Lake Winnipeg in Manitoba, Canada. The park is located within the Rural Municipality of St. Clements and can be accessed by road from Manitoba Provincial Road 319. In the summer, people relax by the lake on the fine sand beach. During the winter, people using snowmobiles or quads to go ice fishing on Balsam Bay get on to the lake from the south parking lot.

== History ==
Patricia Beach Provincial Park was designated a provincial park by the Government of Manitoba in 1961. It is 54.42 ha (0.2101 sq mi) in size. Facilities within the park are limited to washrooms and a concession during the summer months.

== Geography ==
The park is located on a narrow strip of sand and gravel extending between Balsam Bay in Lake Winnipeg and marshy Beaconia Lake. This barrier beach is broken by a channel at the northern end of the park allowing water from the lagoon into the lake itself. The lake shore drops off very gradually with many shifting sandbars below the water surface. The fine sand beach is backed by thinly vegetated active sand dunes. A strip of forest divides the sandy areas from the inland marsh. The width of the open beach area is dependent on the overall level of the Lake Winnipeg south basin. In addition, wind driven seiche events can cause the water to rise or lower over the ice-free season.

== Ecology ==
The park is identified as a birding hotspot with over 220 species recorded observed. The southern half is within the boundaries of the Netley-Libau Marsh Important Bird Area (IBA), enclosing a network of wetlands on either side of the outflow of the Red River into Lake Winnipeg. This network of marshes provide an important staging area for birds migrating to southern wintering grounds.

== See also ==
- List of provincial parks in Manitoba
