= Bakers Narrows Provincial Park =

Provincial park in Manitoba, Canada

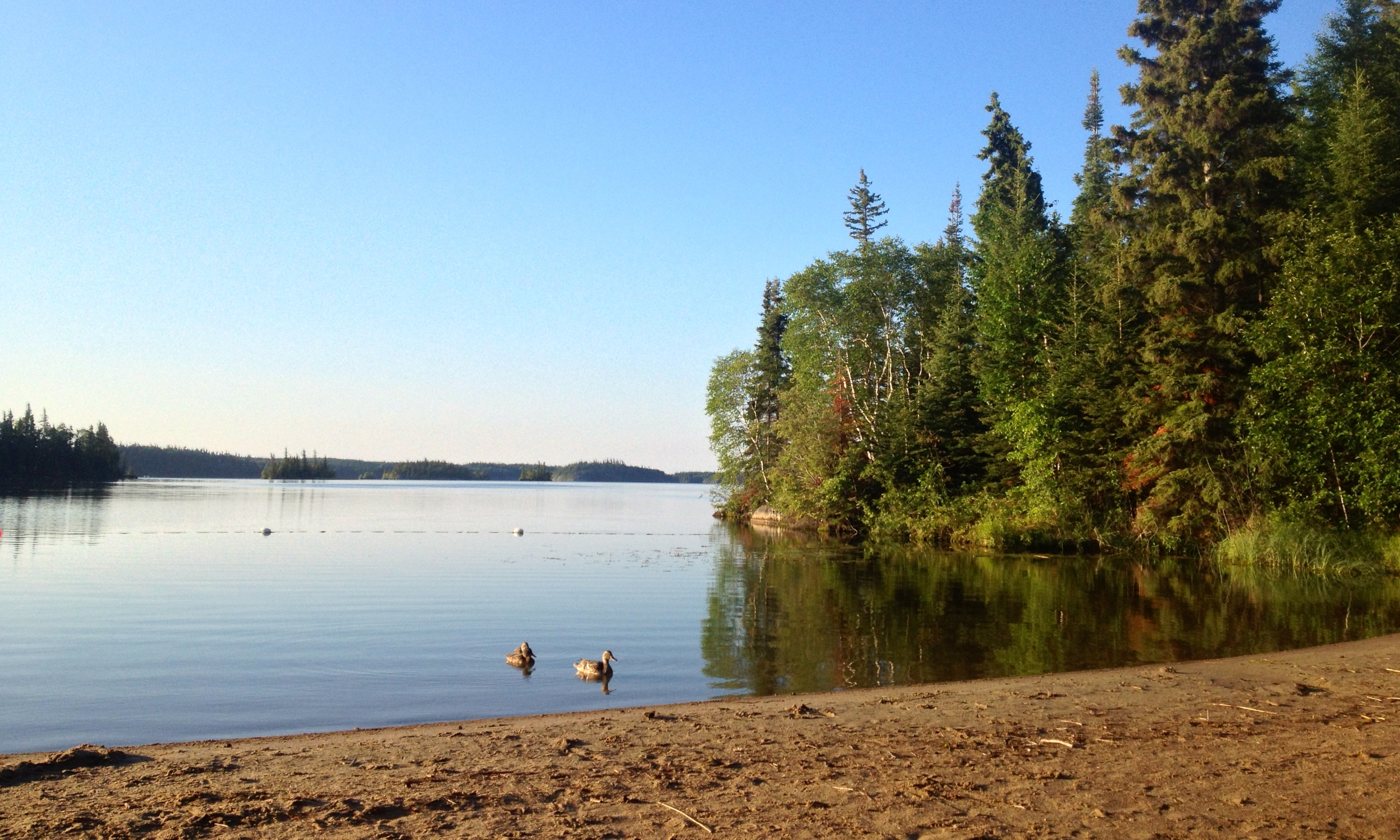

- Location within Manitoba
- Location: Northern Region, Manitoba
- Nearest city: Flin Flon
- Coordinates: 54°40′16″N 101°40′30″W
- Area: 145 ha (360 acres)

Bakers Narrows Provincial Park is a provincial park south of Flin Flon in the Northern Region of Manitoba, Canada. It is 145 hectares (0.56 sq mi) in size. It was designated as a provincial park in 1961.

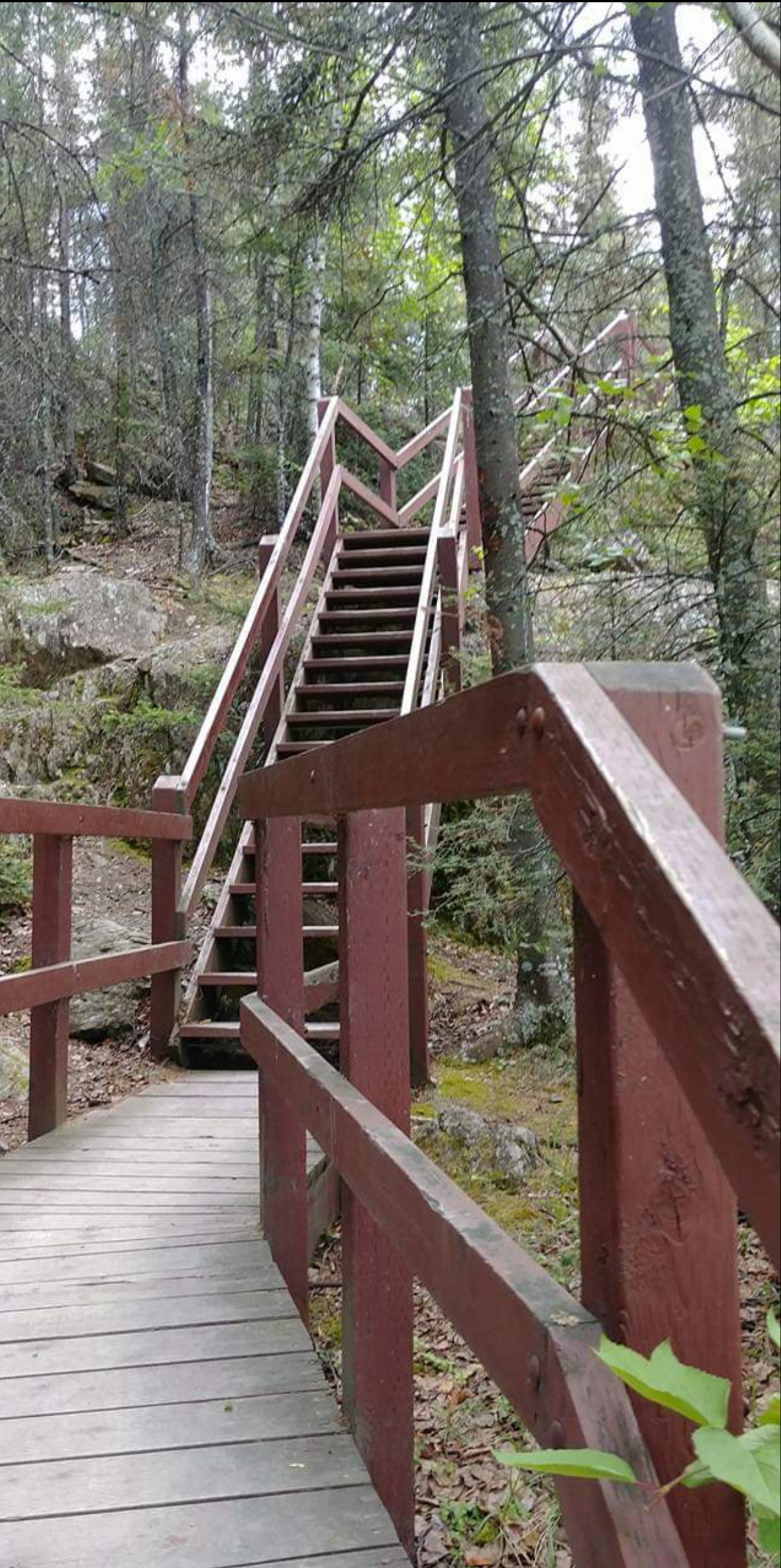
Stairs to viewing tower

A viewing tower with interpretive signage provides a view of the park and Lake Athapapuskow.

The park is located within the Namew Lake Ecodistrict in the Mid-Boreal Lowland Ecoregion within the Boreal Plains Ecozone.

== See also ==
- List of protected areas of Manitoba
- List of provincial parks in Manitoba
