= MS Lord Selkirk II =

Former Canadian passenger cruise ship

- MS Lord Selkirk II at the mouth of the Red River
- Name: MS Lord Selkirk II
- Route: Red River, Lake Winnipeg
- Builder: Purvis Navcon/Selkirk Machine Works Ltd.
- Cost: $1,509,565
- Launched: June 7, 1969
- Christened: June 9, 1969
- Maiden voyage: June 23, 1969 from Selkirk, Manitoba to Winnipeg, Manitoba
- Fate: Scrapped 2015

General characteristics
- Tonnage: 1486 gross, 1009 registered
- Length: 176 feet
- Beam: 41 feet
- Draft: 8 feet 3 inches
- Installed power: Two Caterpillar turbocharged D343 diesels rated @ 375 HP each
- Propulsion: Twin Screw
- Speed: 10 knots
- Capacity: 130 passengers
- Crew: 40 crew

The MS Lord Selkirk II was a passenger cruise ship that sailed the Red River and Lake Winnipeg in Manitoba, Canada. Lake Winnipeg's last cruise ship, she was the largest ever built between the Great Lakes and the Rockies, with accommodation for 130 passengers and 40 crew. She was 176 feet long with a 41-foot beam.

Launched June 7, 1969, the MS Lord Selkirk II sailed for 17 years before being retired in 1990. While active, the ship carried thousands of passengers on multiple-day excursions to Lake Winnipeg and boasted a game room, a dining room, and a lounge where guests could enjoy live entertainment. Some of its more prestigious passengers over the years included Queen Elizabeth II and Premier of Manitoba Edward Schreyer (later the Governor General of Canada), who sailed on the ship in 1970.

She was built to replace the MS Keenora after that wooden vessel was retired. She was originally commissioned to serve the freight and passenger service market on Lake Winnipeg. In addition to her passenger cabins, she also had refrigerated and freezer cargo compartments, and 120 tons of cargo fuel capacity. With the construction of new road access to more communities on the lake and increased access to air travel, the need for the freight and passenger service declined and a focus was put on using the vessel for excursions and vacations by the early 1970s. She was purchased by the Manitoba provincial government in the early 1970s, and was operated by the government as part of Venture Manitoba Tours through the 1978 season. Idle for 1979 in Gull Harbour, she was purchased that year by a group of investors led by Harold Einarson and operated on the lake until through the 1982 season. In 1983, local Winnipeg businessmen Jim Gauthier and Bill Harris purchased the ship and refitted her running it until 1986, when she was purchased by Dr. Joseph Slogan of Selkirk, who operated the ship through the 1990 navigation season on the Red River. It was originally intended to run the ship for the 1991 season, and extensive engineering and mechanical work took place through the winter of 1990/91, but the vessel was idled after a decision was made to run the other two competing river excursion companies - Paddlewheel Riverboats and River Rouge Tours - as a joint venture for 1991 in the face of declining passenger traffic, and to idle the Lord Selkirk II for the season. She never sailed again.

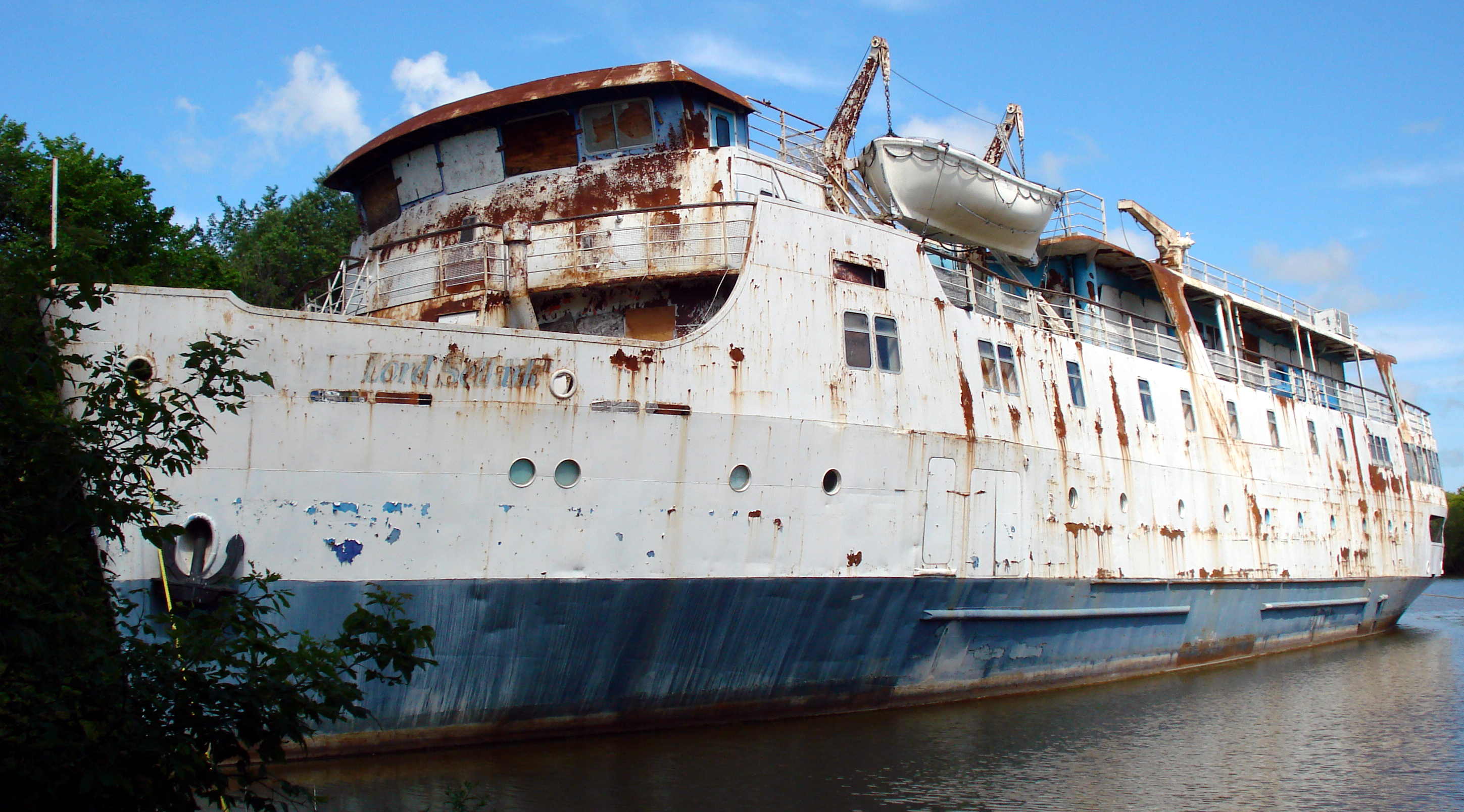
The long retired MS Lord Selkirk II waiting to be dismantled.

The ship, rusted and broken, has been docked at the end of a slough in Selkirk, Manitoba since being retired in October 1990. In July 2010 the ship was sold for scrap to an international. On June 19, 2012, the ship caught fire and is a total loss. Arson is suspected.

A lifeboat and anchor were salvaged and put into the Marine Museum of Manitoba, which is about a block away from the MS Lord Selkirk II's final resting place. As of 2020, the lifeboat and anchor are all that remain of MS Lord Selkirk II.
