= Sturgeon Bay Provincial Park =

Provincial park in Manitoba, Canada

- IUCN category Ib (wilderness area)
- Location within Manitoba
- Interactive map of Sturgeon Bay Provincial Park
- Location: Manitoba, Canada
- Nearest city: Winnipeg, Manitoba
- Coordinates: 51°48′13.878″N 97°48′56.851″W
- Area: 14,490 ha (55.9 sq mi)
- Established: 2015
- Governing body: Government of Manitoba

Sturgeon Bay Provincial Park is a provincial park on the western shore of Lake Winnipeg in Manitoba, Canada. The park is considered to be a Class Ib protected area under the IUCN protected area management categories. It is 144.9 km^{2} (55.9 sq mi) in size.

== History ==
Sturgeon Bay Provincial Park was designated a provincial park by the Government of Manitoba in 2015.

== Geography ==
The northern boundary of the park follows the shore of Lake Winnipeg along Sturgeon Bay. The Mantagao River flows north through the park into the lake on the southeast corner of the bay between Reedy Point and Poplar Point. The park has no road access and no facilities for visitors within its boundaries. A commercial fishing camp is located on the lake shore within the park. It was established prior to the park inception and continues to be used by commercial fishers on Lake Winnipeg.

The park landscape is a generally flat till plain laid down during the formation and draining of glacial Lake Agassiz. It is low lying, with a mean elevation of about 259 metres (850 ft) above sea level, sloping very gently to the lake. Wave action and changes in lake level have created a ridge and swale pattern in the upland areas parallel to the lakeshore. Soils in the park are generally poorly drained organic soils varying in depth over stony calcareous glacial till.

The park has a network of small creeks and ponds draining generally towards the north east into the river and the bay. These are fed by precipitation, shallow aquifers of sand and gravel from glacial deposits and some Silurian limestone bedrock aquifers. Drainage is slowed by the land profile creating a complex of marshlands, wet meadows, fens, and muskeg or bogs.

== Ecology ==
The park is considered representative of the ecology of the Mid-Boreal Lowland Ecoregion within the Boreal Plains Ecozone. Black spruce grows in stands in low lying areas transitioning to mixed stands of black spruce, Jack pine, white spruce, and trembling aspen on drier ridges. Willow and red-osier dogwood form the shrub layer on wetter sites with hazel and heaths on drier sites. Ground cover is composed of mosses and low growing vascular plants.

Bogs and fens—wetland communities characterized by the presence of peat—predominate away from the shores of Lake Winnipeg and the Mantagao River. Bogs are characterized by ombrotrophic conditions—isolated from groundwater, acidic and low in nutrients. Fens are minerotrophic—the minerals in the groundwater modify the chemistry of the water. In the park where the groundwater is in contact with bedrock or till containing lime, water is mildly acid to alkaline.

In some areas, the ridge and swale topography lead to a patterned bog called a string bog. In other areas, flat bogs develop in low-lying flat land. Plateau bogs develop slowly over time and can stand up to 2 metres (6.6 ft) above the surrounding ground level. Water track fens are found where groundwater flows are stronger; horizontal fens where groundwater slowly seeps from the mineral soil below the peat. Vegetation associated with these wetlands in the park include tamarack, swamp birch, Labrador tea, leatherleaf, bog rosemary, sedges, grasses, and mosses ( particularly sphagnum, feather mosses and brown mosses).

The Mantagao River provides spawning habitat for northern pike, walleye, lake whitefish and freshwater drum.

The park is located within the Boreal Taiga Plains Bird Conservation Region. The abundance and variety of water habitats in this region provide breeding habitat for waterfowl. The river mouth and the adjacent bay are used as staging areas in the fall for migrating waterfowl. Birds found in this region include:

- Black scoter
- Hudsonian whimbrel
- Rock ptarmigan
- Willow ptarmigan
- Grey-cheeked thrush
- American tree sparrow
- Short-billed dowitcher
- Common redpoll
- Harris's sparrow
- Northern shrike
- Blackpoll warbler
- Fox sparrow
- Rough-legged hawk

Large mammals known to occur in the park include moose, white-tailed deer, and wolf.

== See also ==
- List of provincial parks in Manitoba
