= Lake Wahtopanah =

Lake in Manitoba, Canada

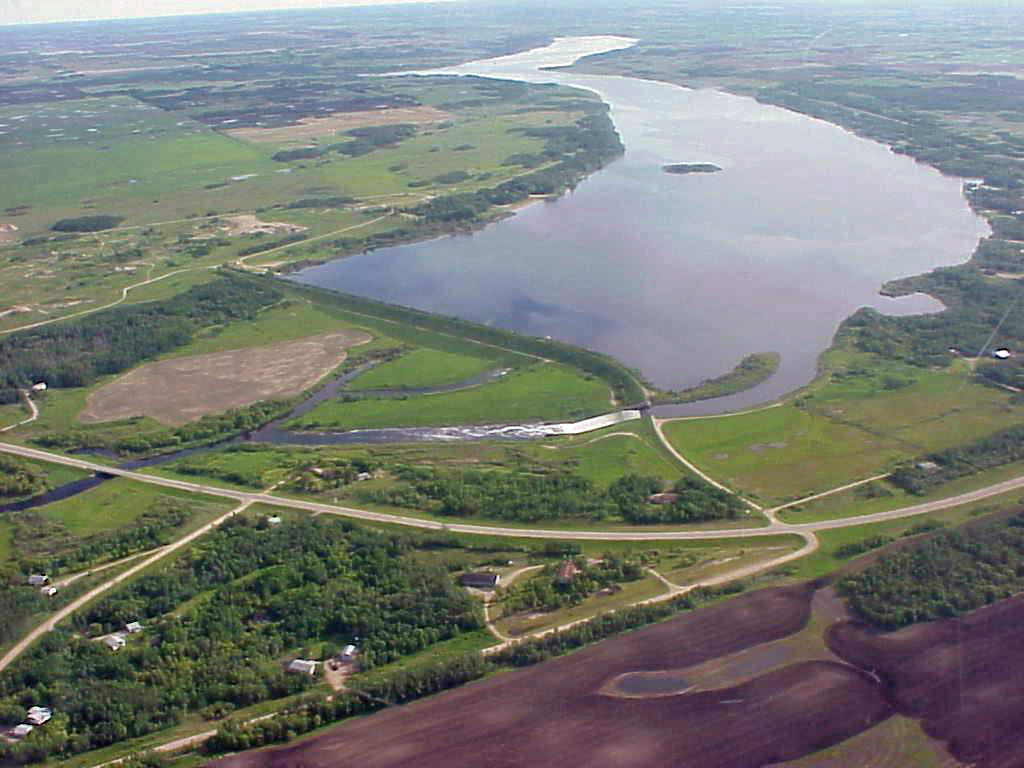

- Location of the lake in Manitoba Lake Wahtopanah (Canada)
- Location: Rural Municipality of Daly / Rural Municipality of Saskatchewan, Manitoba
- Coordinates: 50°03′55″N 100°10′20″W
- Type: Artificial lake
- Primary inflows: Little Saskatchewan River
- Catchment area: 1,260 sq mi (3,300 km^{2})
- Basin countries: Canada
- Max. length: 6 mi (9.7 km)
- Max. width: 2,000 ft (610 m)
- Surface area: 1,580 acres (6.4 km^{2})
- Max. depth: 50 ft (15 m)
- Water volume: 24,500 acre⋅ft (30,200,000 m^{3})
- Surface elevation: 1,536 ft (468 m)

Lake Wahtopanah (Dakota: Watop̣ana Bde), also known as Rivers Reservoir, is a reservoir on the Little Saskatchewan River near the town of Rivers, Manitoba. Its dam is the Rivers Dam.

It is home to Rivers Provincial Park, located on the west shore of the lake.

The lake's name is a diminutive form of the Dakota language word watóp̣a which refers to the act of paddling a canoe or other small boat.

== Details ==
The reservoir is about 610 metres (2,000 ft) wide and 9.7 kilometres (6 mi) long. Its deepest point is about 15 m (50 ft). Riparian flows are regulated by a 1.2 m (4 ft) square gated conduit. High flows pass over a 34 m (110 ft) wide concrete chute spillway. The reservoir stores about 30,200,000 m^{3} (24,500 acre-feet) and covers an area of about 6.4 km^{2} (1,580 acres).

The drainage area is about 3,300 km^{2} (1,260 sq mi) and extends well into Riding Mountain National Park.

Rivers Dam supplements water supplies for irrigation, as well as providing the water supply for the town of Rivers, stock watering, and recreation (such as fishing and canoeing).

The most popular species caught in the lake are northern pike, walleye, and yellow perch.

== History ==
The dam was built by the Prairie Farm Rehabilitation Administration in 1960 to supplement water supplies for irrigation.

=== 2020 flood ===
In late June and early July 2020, heavy rainfall caused a runoff event with record flooding on the Little Saskatchewan River.

The flow peaked at about 300 cubic metres per second (10,600 cubic feet per second). The area received over 51 cm (20 in) of rain over a 5-day period causing the lake to flood to the never-before-seen level of 471.02 m (1,545.3 ft) above sea level, 2.85 m (9.4 ft) above the full supply level.

The water level at the Rivers Dam reached record-high levels during the rainfall, affecting nearby communities including Brandon, Riverdale, and Whitehead. This caused the Manitoba government to lose confidence in the dam and to warn everyone down stream of the likelihood of dam failure and catastrophic flooding.

Nearby municipalities declared states of emergency, and the city of Brandon put over 2,000 residents on evacuation notice. Approximately 83 people had to evacuate from their homes in the Rivers Dam flood zone area.

Once the flood waters receded, the province was able to assess the dam, with interim repairs to the spillway being completed in February 2021. In July 2023, the Manitoba government announced that permanent rehabilitation work of the dam has begun.

== See also ==
- List of lakes of Manitoba
- List of dams and reservoirs in Canada
