= Grand Rapids Provincial Park =

Provincial park in Manitoba, Canada

- Location within Manitoba
- Location: Northern Region, Manitoba
- Nearest city: Lynn Lake
- Coordinates: 53°8′31″N 99°17′6″W
- Area: 7.36 ha (18.2 acres)
- Created: 1974

Grand Rapids Provincial Park is a provincial park in the Canadian province of Manitoba, designated in 1974. It is 7.36 ha (18.2 acres) in size. It is located south of the settlement of Grand Rapids, adjacent to the former riverbed of the Saskatchewan River. (Note: In 1963, the Grand Rapids Generating Station diverted the river away from the park location.)

== See also ==
- List of protected areas of Manitoba
- List of provincial parks in Manitoba
