= Goose Islands Provincial Park =

Provincial park in Manitoba, Canada

- IUCN category III (natural monument or feature)
- Location within Manitoba
- Interactive map of Goose Islands Provincial Park
- Location: Manitoba, Canada
- Nearest town: Grand Rapids, Manitoba
- Coordinates: 52°43′49.5″N 99°44′19.4″W
- Area: 137 ha (340 acres)
- Established: 2017
- Governing body: Government of Manitoba

Goose Islands Provincial Park is a provincial park protecting the Goose Islands on Lake Winnipegosis in Manitoba, Canada.

Goose Islands Provincial Park was designated a provincial park by the Government of Manitoba on 16 June 2017. The park is 137 hectares (340 acres) in size. The park is considered to be a Class III protected area under the IUCN protected area management categories.

The park protects an area of the Boreal Plains Ecozone (CEC) Five islands off the east shore of Lake Winnipegosis provide nesting habitat for ring-billed gulls, American herring gulls, Caspian terns, common terns and double-crested cormorants.

== See also ==
- List of protected areas of Manitoba
- List of provincial parks in Manitoba
