= Rivers Provincial Park =

Provincial park in Manitoba, Canada

- IUCN category III (natural monument or feature)
- Location within Manitoba
- Interactive map of Rivers Provincial Park
- Location: Manitoba, Canada
- Nearest town: Rivers, Manitoba
- Coordinates: 50°2′24″N 100°11′42″W
- Area: .86 km^{2} (0.33 sq mi)
- Established: 1961
- Governing body: Government of Manitoba

Rivers Provincial Park is a provincial park in the Canadian province of Manitoba, designated by the Government of Manitoba in 1961. The park is .86 square kilometres (0.33 sq mi) in size and is considered to be a Class III protected area under the IUCN protected area management categories.

== See also ==
- List of protected areas of Manitoba
- Lake Wahtopanah
- Little Saskatchewan River
