= Colvin Lake (Michigan) =

- Location within Michigan
- Location: Berrien County, Michigan
- Coordinates: 41°53′39″N 86°23′29″W
- Type: Lake
- Surface area: 5.489 acres (2.221 ha)
- Surface elevation: 696 feet (212 m)

Colvin Lake is a lake in Berrien County, in the U.S. state of Michigan. The lake is 5.489 acres (2.221 ha) in size.

Colvin Lake was named after Absalom Colvin, a pioneer citizen.
