= Grass River Provincial Park =

Provincial park in Canada

- IUCN category III (natural monument or feature)
- Location within Manitoba
- Interactive map of Grass River Provincial Park
- Location: Manitoba, Canada
- Nearest town: Cranberry Portage, Manitoba
- Coordinates: 54°39′59″N 100°49′51″W)
- Area: 2,279 km^{2} (880 sq mi)
- Established: 1963
- Governing body: Government of Manitoba

Grass River Provincial Park is a 2,279 km^{2} provincial park in Northwestern Manitoba, Canada. Designated in 1963, the park is approximately 75 km north of The Pas and is centered on the Grass River. The southern part of the park includes portions of the dolomitic Manitoba Lowlands of the Interior Plains, while the northern portion includes part of the granitic Canadian Shield. It is crossed east-west by Manitoba Highway 39 (PTH 39), with PTH 10 crossing the western edge of the park. The entire park shows evidence of glaciation. The park is considered to be a Class III protected area under the IUCN protected area management categories.

During the 20th century a number of mines operated in the park, the last of which closed in 1993.

== See also ==
- List of protected areas of Manitoba
