= Kettle Stones Provincial Park =

Provincial park in Manitoba, Canada

- IUCN category III (natural monument or feature)
- Location within Manitoba
- Interactive map of Kettle Stones Provincial Park
- Location: Manitoba, Canada
- Nearest town: Swan River, Manitoba
- Coordinates: 52°21′33″N 100°35′43″W
- Area: 4 km^{2} (1.5 sq mi)
- Established: 1997
- Governing body: Government of Manitoba

Kettle Stones Provincial Park is a provincial park designated by the Government of Manitoba, Canada, in 1997. The park is 4 square kilometres (1.5 sq mi) in size. The park is considered to a Class III protected area under the IUCN protected area management categories.

== See also ==
- List of protected areas of Manitoba
