= Pisew Falls Provincial Park =

Provincial park in Manitoba, Canada

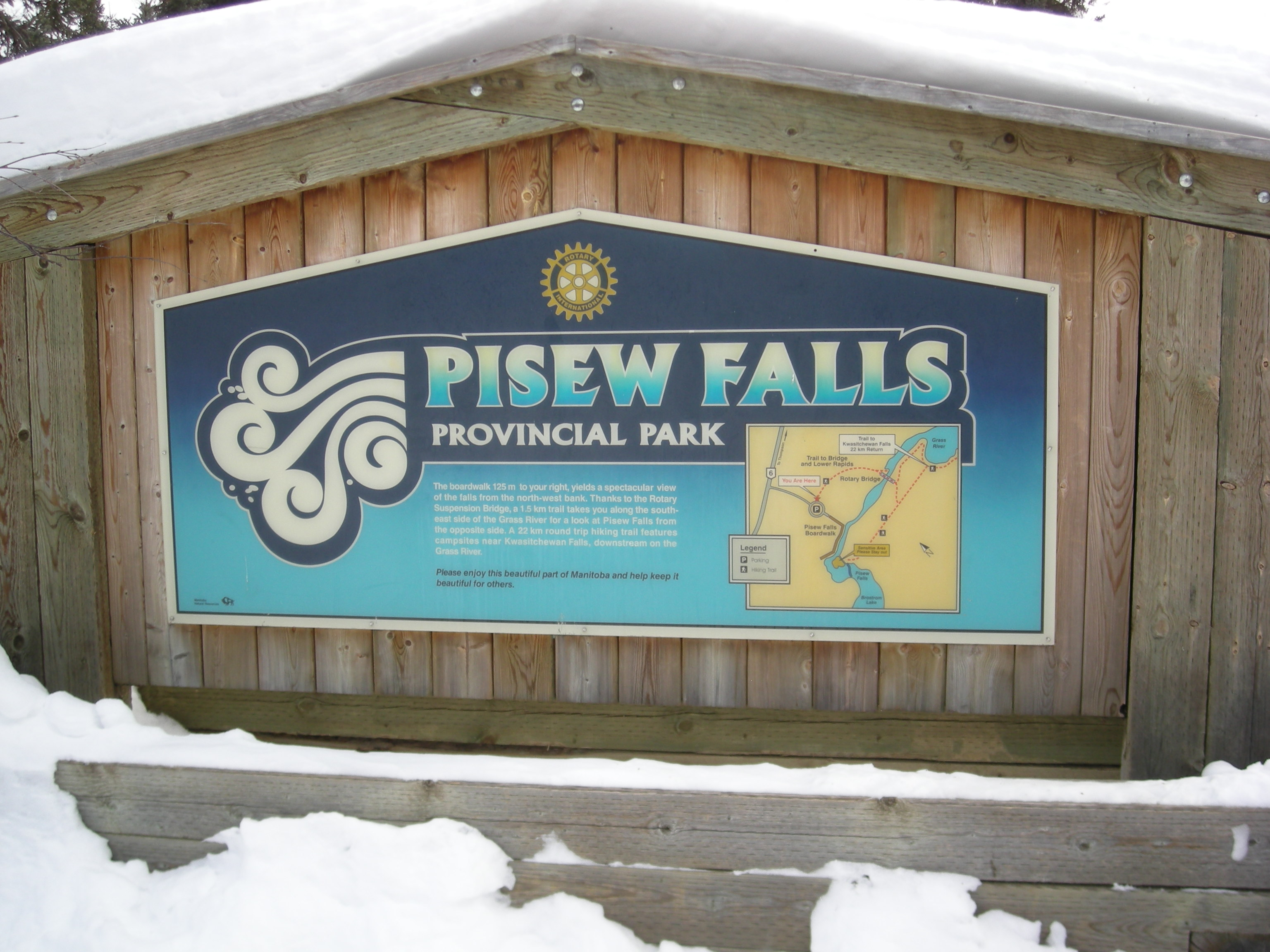
- Pisew Falls park entrance

- Location within Manitoba
- Type: Provincial heritage park
- Nearest city: Thompson, Manitoba
- Coordinates: 55.19778°N 98.39667°W

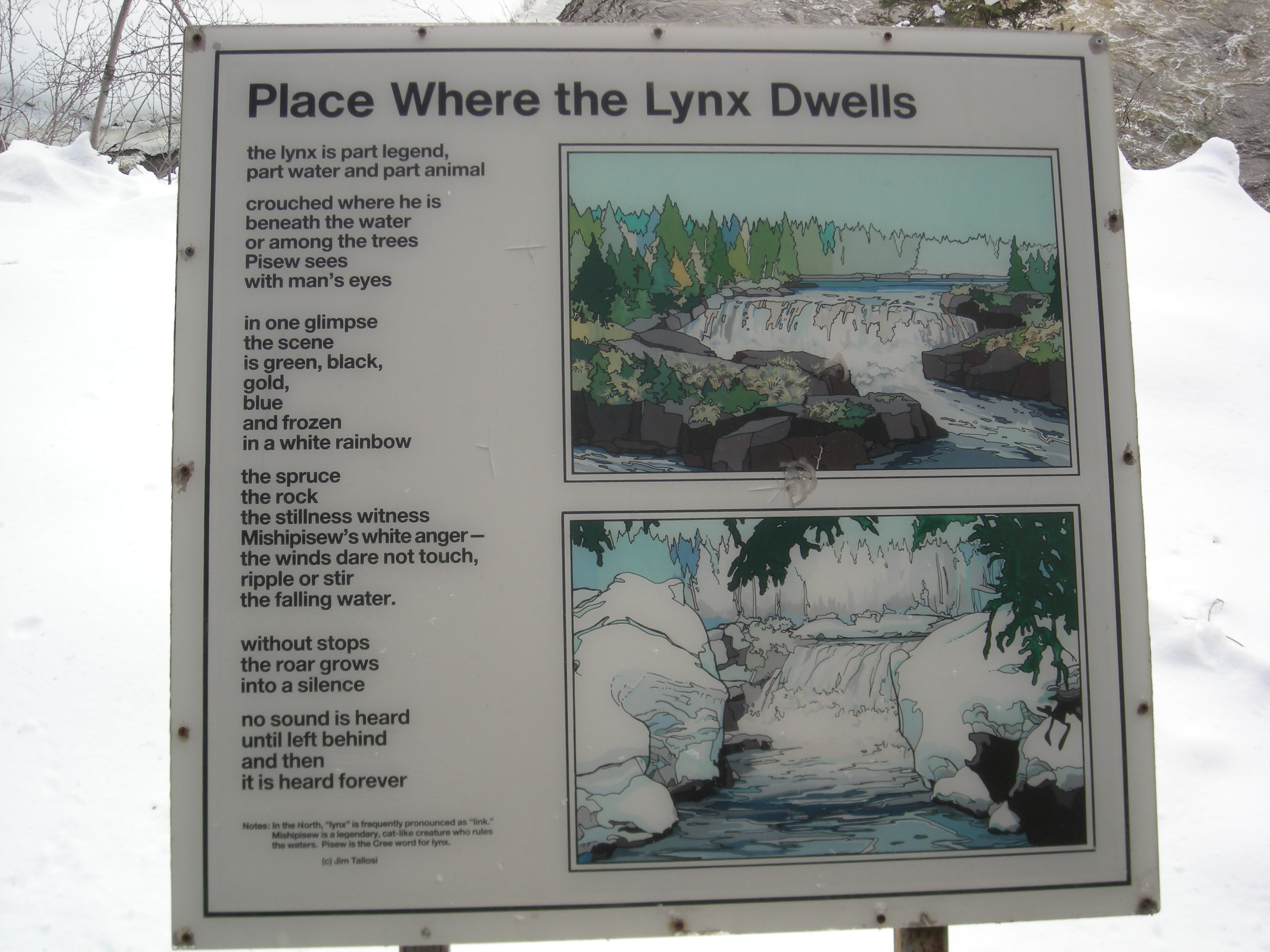
Story of the lynx at Pisew Falls

Pisew Falls Provincial Park is a provincial heritage park in the southwestern portion of Mystery Lake, Manitoba, Canada.

Located near Kwasitchewan Falls, Manitoba's highest waterfall, Pisew Falls stands at the approximate midpoint between the small community of Wabowden and the much larger industrial and service centre of Thompson. It is also located approximately 700 km (430 mi) north of Winnipeg, and 500 m (1,600 ft) from Highway 6.

The name Pisew is translated from words for "lynx" in the local Cree language, named for the sound of the hissing water which bears a resemblance to the sounds made by the wild lynx.

Pisew Falls' creation was due to the intensive geological activity in the area hundreds of thousands of years ago, when violent tectonic effects caused the creation of first a fault, and then an upheaval of the southern side of the fault-line. This has left a rift in the landscape with a waterfall riotously cascading over and through it.

== Micro-climate ==
Pisew Falls in winter

Because of the continuous flow of water over the falls, the localized area has developed its own microclimate. A wide variety of mosses, lichens, and fungi can be found in the immediate area around the base of the falls. There are also a variety of ferns whose origins date back to before the last ice age. The dominant winter feature downstream and to the right of the falls is the ice that builds up on top of a small island there. This island only rises a few feet above the downstream water level in summer, but by late February, the ice accumulates to approximately 3–5 metres thick from the months of freezing spray.

Summer, from front of Pisew Falls

At the periphery of this barrier between liquid water and frozen surroundings lies a thin ridge of plant growth that continues to survive throughout the harshest of the -45 degree Celsius days in this frigid northern wilderness. Normally the process of photosynthesis ceases in the surrounding area.

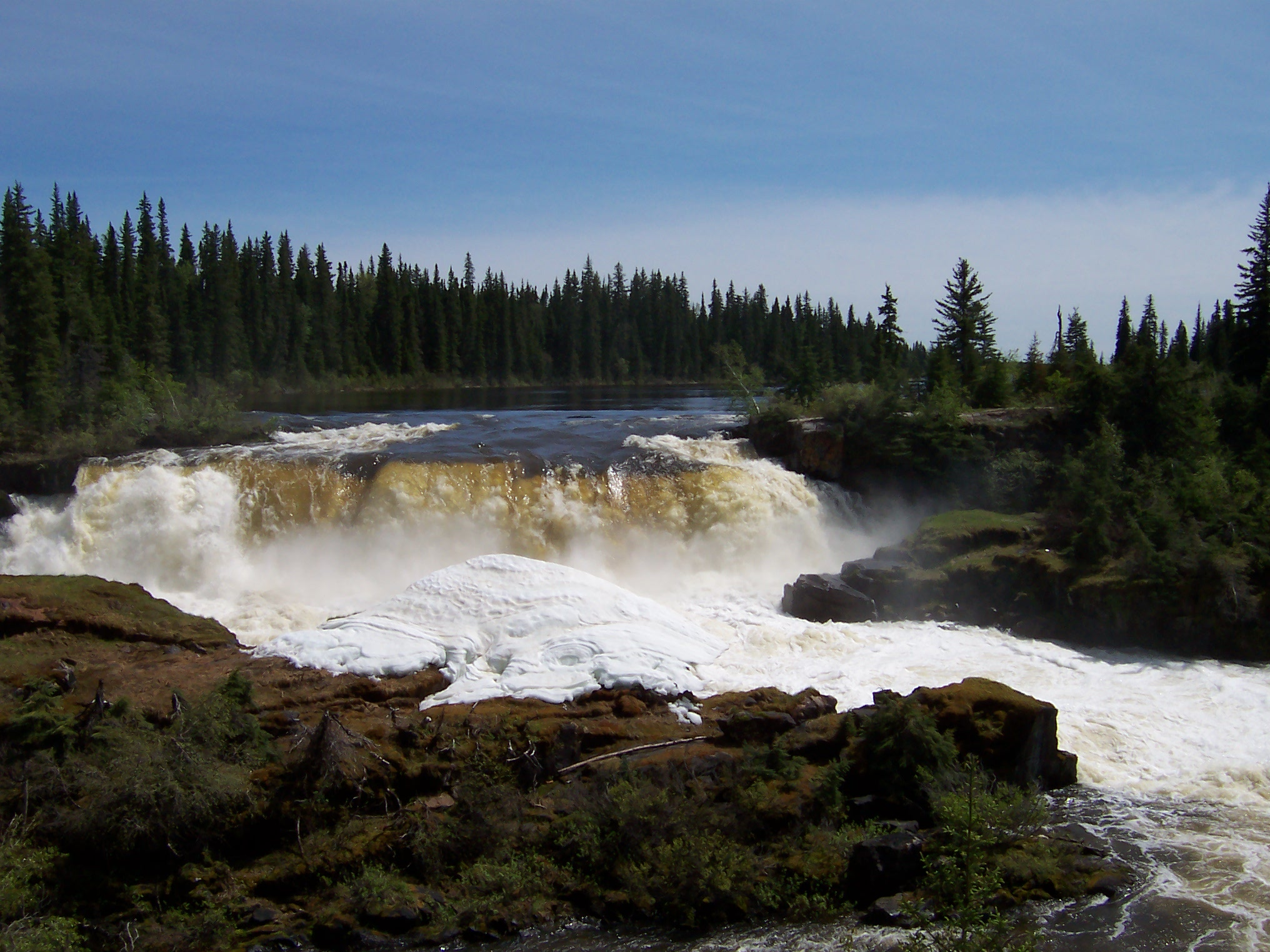
Pisew Falls in June

It is common to see one or more of the local otters using the large ice buildup as a "slide", providing the otters and lucky spectators with hours of amusement.

Officers of Manitoba Conservation ask that visitors keep the area clean and stay well away from the areas below the falls, which are clearly marked as "Environmentally Sensitive". As long as everyone co-operates in this respect, this remarkable piece of geography will be here for many generations to come.

== Activities ==
=== Camping and hiking ===
Camping is not permitted at the falls themselves. There are no shower facilities, no electrical services, and the only toilet facilities are of the outhouse variety. There is a picnic area, and another place for a stopping if travelling further north or south.

There are two hiking trails with rugged campsites leading from the Picnic and Falls areas. The trails are very rugged, and only recommended for experienced backpackers to attempt. The trail to Kwasitchewan Falls is 22 km (about 13 miles) return.

=== Canoe and kayak ===
The campsites are accessible by water and a short portage via the Grass River and Phillips Lake.

Motorized boats over 14 ft (4 m) are generally not recommended because of the lack of boat launching facilities.

== Caution ==
There are several warnings about wildlife including bears. There are a number of black bears who reside in this area, as well as wolves, and cougars which have been spotted as far north as Thompson, Manitoba.

Due to the relatively high humidity present year-round, it is possible to slip on fresh wet greenery in the summer, and slick ice in the winter. It may be dangerous to stray too far off the clearly marked path. There has been one fatality at the falls in recent years, and a Memorial Trail-Marker is there to mark it. The ledges are steep, the fall is long, and the current below is swift. Caution is advised at all times.

== See also ==
- List of Canadian provincial parks
- List of Manitoba parks
