= Bell Lake Provincial Park =

Provincial park in Manitoba, Canada

- Location within Manitoba
- Interactive map of Bell Lake Provincial Park
- Location: Manitoba
- Nearest city: Swan River
- Coordinates: 52°32′30″N 101°14′29″W
- Area: 4 ha (9.9 acres)
- Established: 1974

Bell Lake Provincial Park is a provincial park on the north shore of Bell Lake in the Porcupine Provincial Forest, Manitoba, Canada. It is 4 hectares (9.9 acres) in size. It was designated as a provincial park in 1974.

The park is located within the Porcupine Hills Ecodistrict in the Mid-Boreal Uplands Ecoregion within the Boreal Plains Ecozone.

== See also ==
- List of protected areas of Manitoba
- List of provincial parks in Manitoba
