= Sasagiu Rapids Provincial Park =

Provincial park in Manitoba, Canada

Coordinates: 55°8′55″N 98°27′9″W

Sasagiu Rapids Provincial Park is a provincial park in Manitoba, Canada. It is located 85 kilometres south of Thompson on Highway 6, and covers all portions of unsubdivided Sections 10 and 15 Township 71 Range 7 W.P.M. shown on Plan 19853. It lies in the southwestern portion of the Mystery Lake Local Government District.

== Overview ==
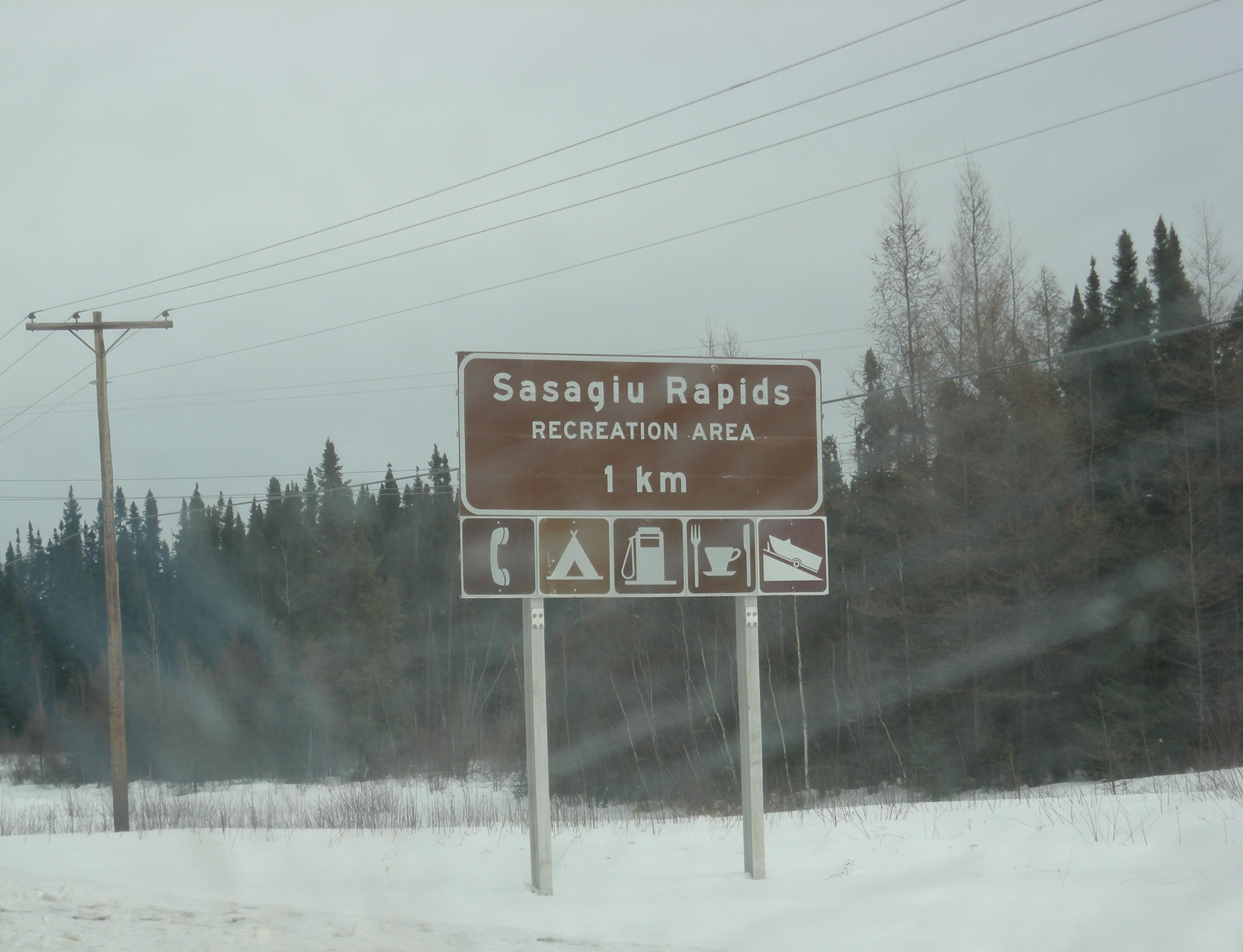
Sign at the entrance of Sasagiu Rapids Provincial Park.

The main feature of this small park is the Sasagiu Rapids, a rapids in the Grass River between Setting Lake and Brostrom Lake, that runs under the highway.

The park was formed in 1974 as a small wayside park, and expanded its boundaries later.

The park area was leased to a private operator in 1992 and continues to operate solely as a campground and recreation area.

== Accommodations ==
There is a privately operated campground encompassing the boundaries of the park called Sasagiu Rapids Campground. The Sasagiu Rapids Lodge and campsites (different owner) are just outside the park campground's south and east boundary.

== See also ==
List of Manitoba parks
