= Numaykoos Lake Provincial Park =

Provincial park in Manitoba, Canada

- IUCN category Ib (wilderness area)
- Location within Manitoba
- Interactive map of Numaykoos Lake Provincial Park
- Location: Manitoba, Canada
- Nearest city: Thompson, Manitoba
- Coordinates: 57°51′55″N 95°57′48″W
- Area: 3,600 km^{2} (1,400 sq mi)
- Established: 1995
- Governing body: Government of Manitoba

Numaykoos Lake Provincial Park was designated a provincial park by the Government of Manitoba in 1995. The park is 3,600 square kilometres (1,400 sq mi) in size. The park is considered to be a Class Ib protected area under the IUCN protected area management categories.

== See also ==
- List of protected areas of Manitoba
