= Hecla-Grindstone Provincial Park =

Provincial park in Manitoba, Canada

- IUCN category V (protected landscape/seascape)
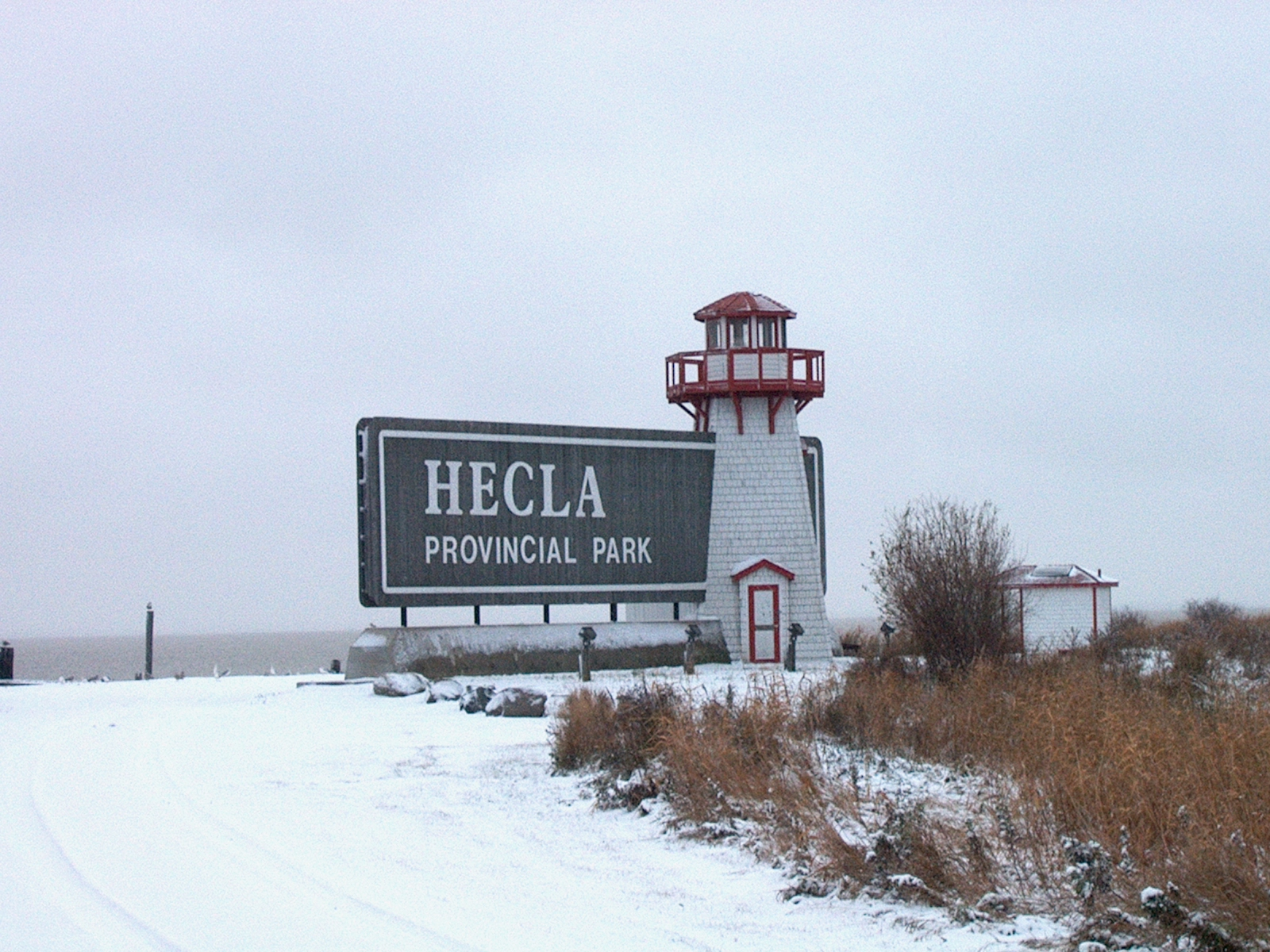
- Hecla Island welcome sign

- Location within Manitoba
- Interactive map of Hecla-Grindstone Provincial Park
- Location: Manitoba, Canada
- Nearest town: Riverton, Manitoba
- Coordinates: 51°05′37″N 96°43′16″W
- Area: 1,084 km^{2} (419 sq mi)
- Established: 1969
- Governing body: Government of Manitoba

Hecla-Grindstone Provincial Park is a provincial park in Manitoba, Canada, which includes Hecla Island, Grindstone (the area located on the mainland peninsula along the west shore of Lake Winnipeg), Black Island, and several other small islands in Lake Winnipeg, one of the largest freshwater lakes in the world. The park lies adjacent to the northeast side of the Municipality of Bifrost – Riverton in Manitoba.

== History ==
The Government of Manitoba designated Hecla Island as a provincial park in 1969. Grindstone Provincial Park was added in 1997 to create Hecla-Grindstone Provincial Park. The park is 1,084 square kilometres (419 sq mi) in size. The park is considered to be a Class V protected area under the IUCN protected area management categories.

The island was settled by the second wave of Icelandic immigrants in 1876 and originally called Mikley (meaning the magnificent island). The population thrived for a number of years until faced with the hardships of winters, disease and poor economic outlook for commercial fishing and farming. The only school on the island closed in 1970.

Landscapes are varied, and include areas of coniferous and mixed forests, limestone cliffs and silica sand beaches, as well as marshes, bogs, fens and wet meadows. Classified as a Natural Park, its purpose is to preserve areas that are representative of the Mid Boreal Lowland portion of the Manitoba Lowlands Natural Region; and accommodate a diversity of recreational opportunities and resource uses.

Currently, Hecla Island has a number of tourist attractions from a campground, resort hotel (formerly known as Gull Harbour, renovated and reopened as Radisson Hecla Oasis Resort). In 2013 the resort was purchased by new owners and operates as Lakeview Hecla Resort. The resort features sandy beaches, summer homes, a full-service marina, Lighthouse trail and 18-hole golf course.

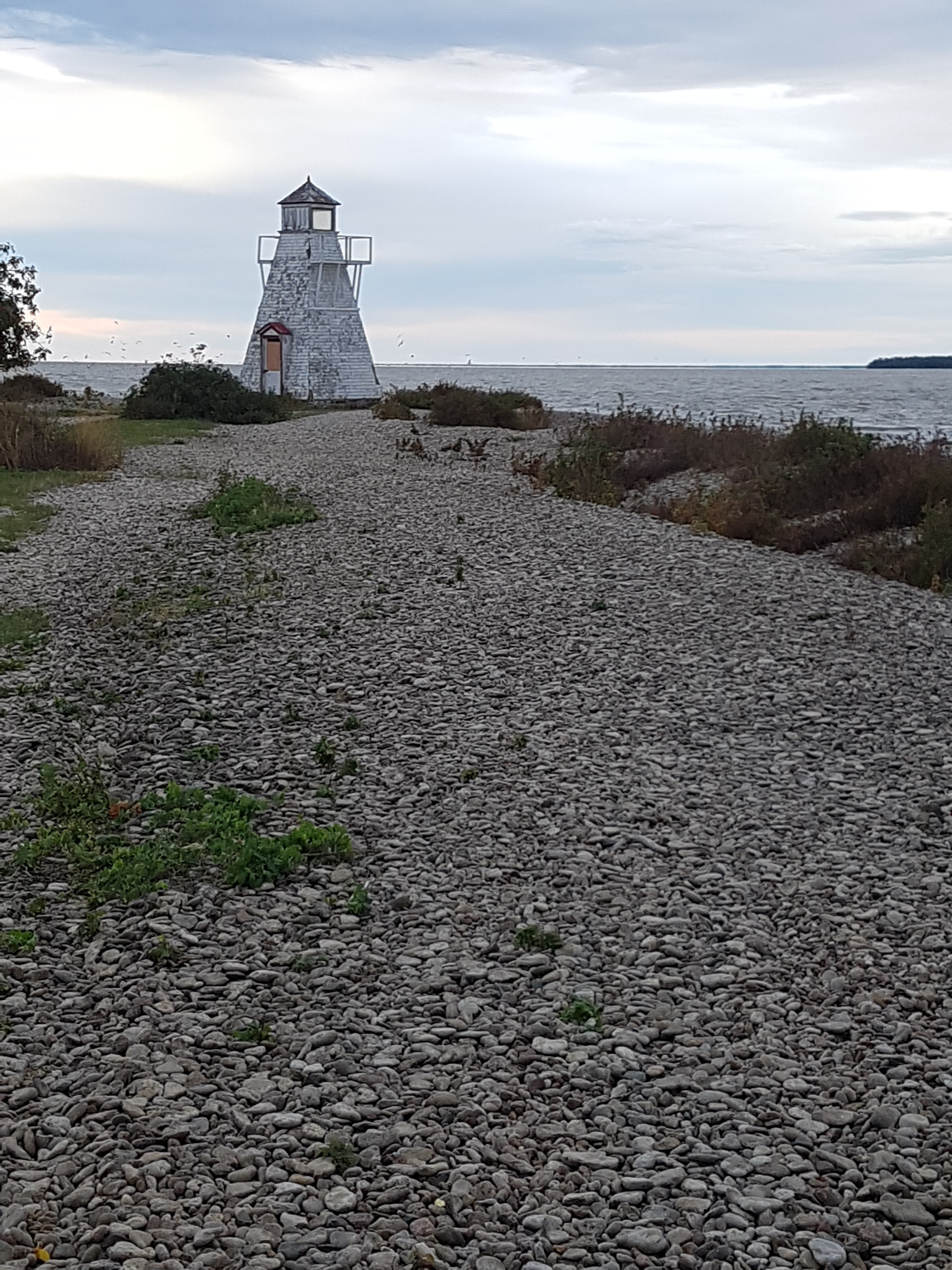
Hecla Lighthouse and Lighthouse Trail. The trail is a crushed stone pathway. Provides a view of Hecla shoreline and neighbouring Black Island.

The golf course and marina are operated privately and are independent of the provincial park.

== Hecla Village ==
Hecla Village is a historic village consisting of a fishing museum and functional commercial fishing operation at the Hecla Fish Station adjacent to the dock; the Tomasson Boarding House; the Community Hall; the Hecla School consisting of a replica classroom in one room and a park interpretive centre in the other classroom; the Heritage House Museum, furnished as an Icelandic family house in 1920s to 1940s style, which is operated by the Descendants and Friends of Hecla; the General Store open from May to September; the log house; the Ice House Museum containing carpentry & fishing tools and sawmill artifacts; the Hecla Church featuring non-denominational services and special musical events during July & August; a bed & breakfast in a restored historic Icelandic home owned and operated by commercial fishers; and numerous privately owned cottages.

== Grindstone ==
Grindstone is a long peninsula approximately equal in size to Hecla Island. Grindstone has more than 350 privately owned cottages, a general store and sandy beaches. The residents hold an Annual Grindstone Days in early August with family activities. Wildlife in the park includes the black bear, moose, timber wolf, fox, beaver; birds that can be seen include bald eagle, common loon, American white pelican, ruby-throated hummingbird, and various species of woodpecker, hawk, and owl.

== See also ==
- List of protected areas of Manitoba
