= Elk Island Provincial Park =

Provincial park in Manitoba, Canada

- IUCN category III (natural monument or feature)
- Location within Manitoba
- Location: Manitoba, Canada
- Nearest town: Powerview-Pine Falls, Manitoba
- Coordinates: 50°45′17″N 96°32′45″W
- Area: 10.7 km^{2} (4.1 sq mi)
- Established: 1974
- Governing body: Government of Manitoba

Elk Island Provincial Park

Elk Island Provincial Park is a provincial park in Manitoba, Canada. The park is 10.7 square kilometres (4.1 sq mi) in size, and is considered to be a Class III protected area under the IUCN protected area management categories.

== History ==
Elk Island Provincial Park was designated under the Provincial Parks Act by the Government of Manitoba in 1974. The area was protected between 1970 and 1974 as part of nearby Grand Beach Provincial Park.

An island labelled "Isle aux Biches" appears in this approximate location in a 1775 map made by Christopher Dufrost de La Jemeraye from explorations led by La Verendrye.

Elk Island is listed as one of several locations used during fall harvesting of fish from Lake Winnipeg shortly after the creation of Manitoba as a province of Canada in 1870.

Faith Bible Camp, a children's summer camp was established on the island in 1954. The camp was moved to a new location on Sandy Bay in 1969 prior to the island becoming part of Grand Beach Provincial Park.

== See also ==
- List of protected areas of Manitoba
