= Sand Lakes Provincial Park =

Provincial park in Manitoba, Canada

- IUCN category Ib (wilderness area)
- Location within Manitoba
- Interactive map of Sand Lakes Provincial Park
- Location: Manitoba, Canada
- Nearest city: Winnipeg, Manitoba
- Coordinates: 57°50′32″N 98°31′48″W
- Area: 8,310 km^{2} (3,210 sq mi)
- Established: 1995
- Governing body: Government of Manitoba

Sand Lakes Provincial Park is a provincial park in the Canadian province of Manitoba, designated by the Government of Manitoba in 1995. The park is 8,310 square kilometres (3,210 sq mi) in size and is considered a Class Ib protected area under the IUCN protected area management categories.

== In popular culture ==
World War Z, a 2006 novel by Max Brooks, features Sand Lakes as a destination for refugees escaping a zombie apocalypse who ultimately resort to cannibalism after running out of food.

== See also ==
- List of protected areas of Manitoba
- Seal River (Manitoba)
- Caspian tern
