= Colvin Lake Provincial Park =

Provincial park in Manitoba, Canada

- IUCN category Ib (wilderness area)
- Location within Manitoba
- Interactive map of Colvin Lake Provincial Park
- Location: Manitoba, Canada
- Nearest town: Lac Brochet
- Coordinates: 59°41′2″N 101°33′40″W
- Area: 1,630 km^{2} (630 sq mi)
- Established: 2010
- Governing body: Government of Manitoba

Colvin Lake Provincial Park is a provincial park in Manitoba, Canada, designated by the Government of Manitoba in 2010. The park is 1,630 km^{2} (630 sq mi) in size. It is considered a Class Ib protected area under the International Union for Conservation of Nature (IUCN) protected-area management categories.

The park protects a wilderness area in the Selwyn Lake ecoregion, within the transition zone between the boreal forest and tundra known as the land of little sticks. Trees in this zone are stunted due to the presence of permafrost.

The most recent glacial period left many eskers, deposits of sand and gravel up to 50 metres (160 ft) in height. Wildlife and people use the elevated eskers as travel routes. Artifacts from pre-contact peoples have been found where the eskers are near water. The park protects range which is important to the Qamanirjuaq Barren Ground Caribou herds, habitat for wolverine, and summer breeding habitat for migratory birds.

The park is located in the northwestern corner of Manitoba at 59°41′2″N 101°33′40″W. The park's lakes drain northward into Nunavut through the Thlewiaza River. The park is within the traditional territories of the Northlands Denesuline First Nation who continue to have access to the park for traditional uses.

== See also ==
- List of protected areas of Manitoba
- Nueltin Lake Provincial Park
