= Manitoba Provincial Road 290 =

Provincial road in Manitoba, Canada

Provincial Road 290
- PR 290 highlighted in red

Route information
- Maintained by Manitoba Infrastructure
- Length: 20.8 km (12.9 mi)
- Existed: 1989–present

Major junctions
- South end: PR 280 in Jacam
- North end: Limestone Generating Station access road in Bird

Location
- Country: Canada
- Province: Manitoba
- Towns: Gillam

Highway system
- Provincial highways in Manitoba; Winnipeg City Routes
← PR 289	→ PR 291

Provincial Road 290 (also known as PR 290 or Highway 290) is a provincial road within the town limits of Gillam in the Canadian province of Manitoba. PR 290 begins at an intersection with PR 280 in Jacam, just north of the Long Spruce Generating Station, and heads to the northeast to the Limestone Generating Station in Bird. Most of PR 290's length is in a dense forest in northern Manitoba.

== Route description ==
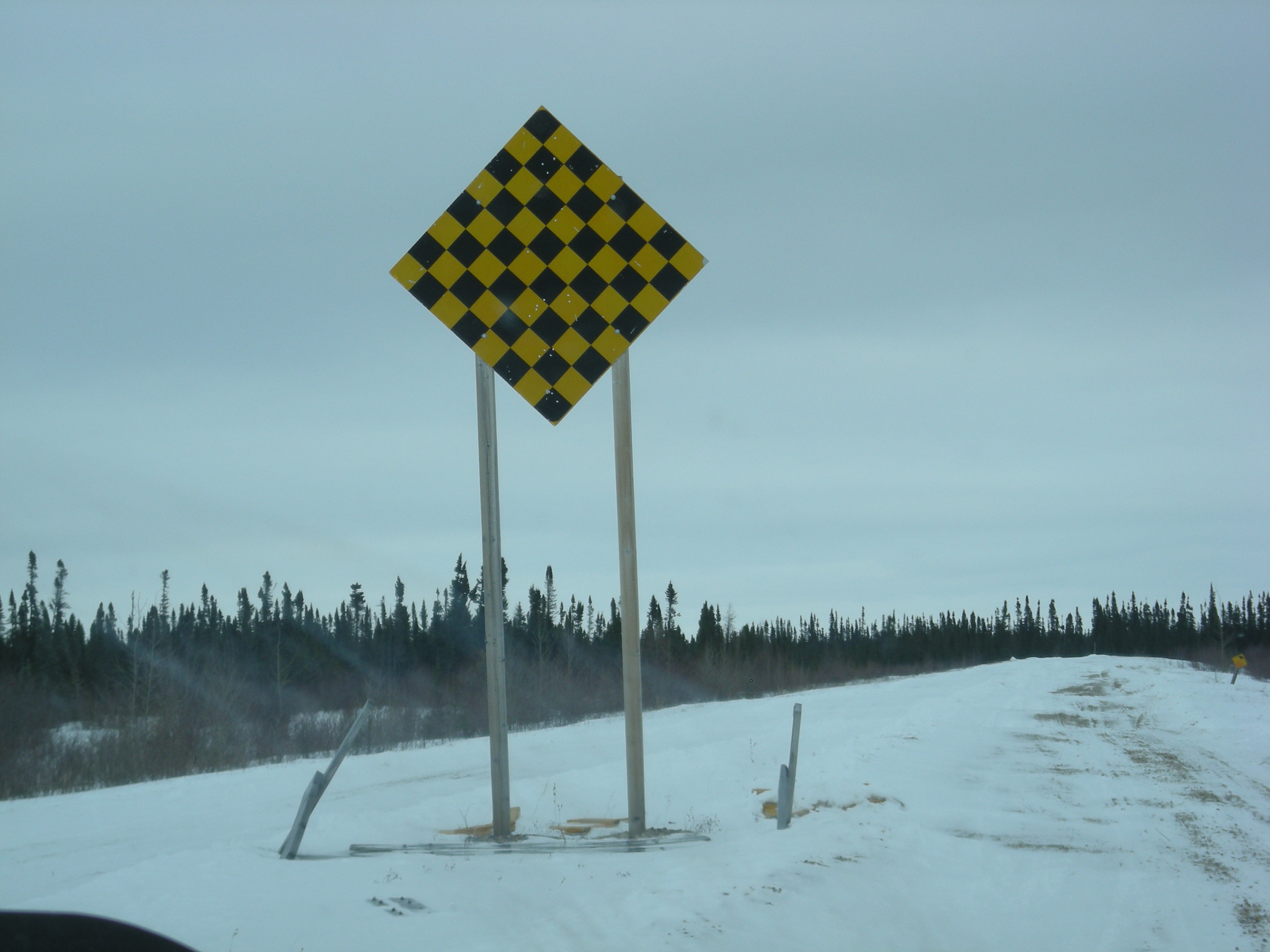
The northern terminus of Manitoba Provincial PR 290

PR 290 begins at an intersection with PR 280 on the north side of the Long Spruce Generating Station, just east of Stephens Lake. The highway crosses through dense forests for much of its length, passing forests roads on its way north. PR 290 turns to the east and heads along the Nelson River, which parallels PR 290 for the whole distance afterwards. The highway continues, turning to the northeast towards the abandoned town of Sundance. Route 290 curves to the northwest and heads towards downtown Sundance.

PR 290 intersects with a local road that begins to climb a mountain, where it enters downtown Sundance. The highway terminates ends about 27 kilometres (17 mi) from Sundance where there are service trailers by the river shore.

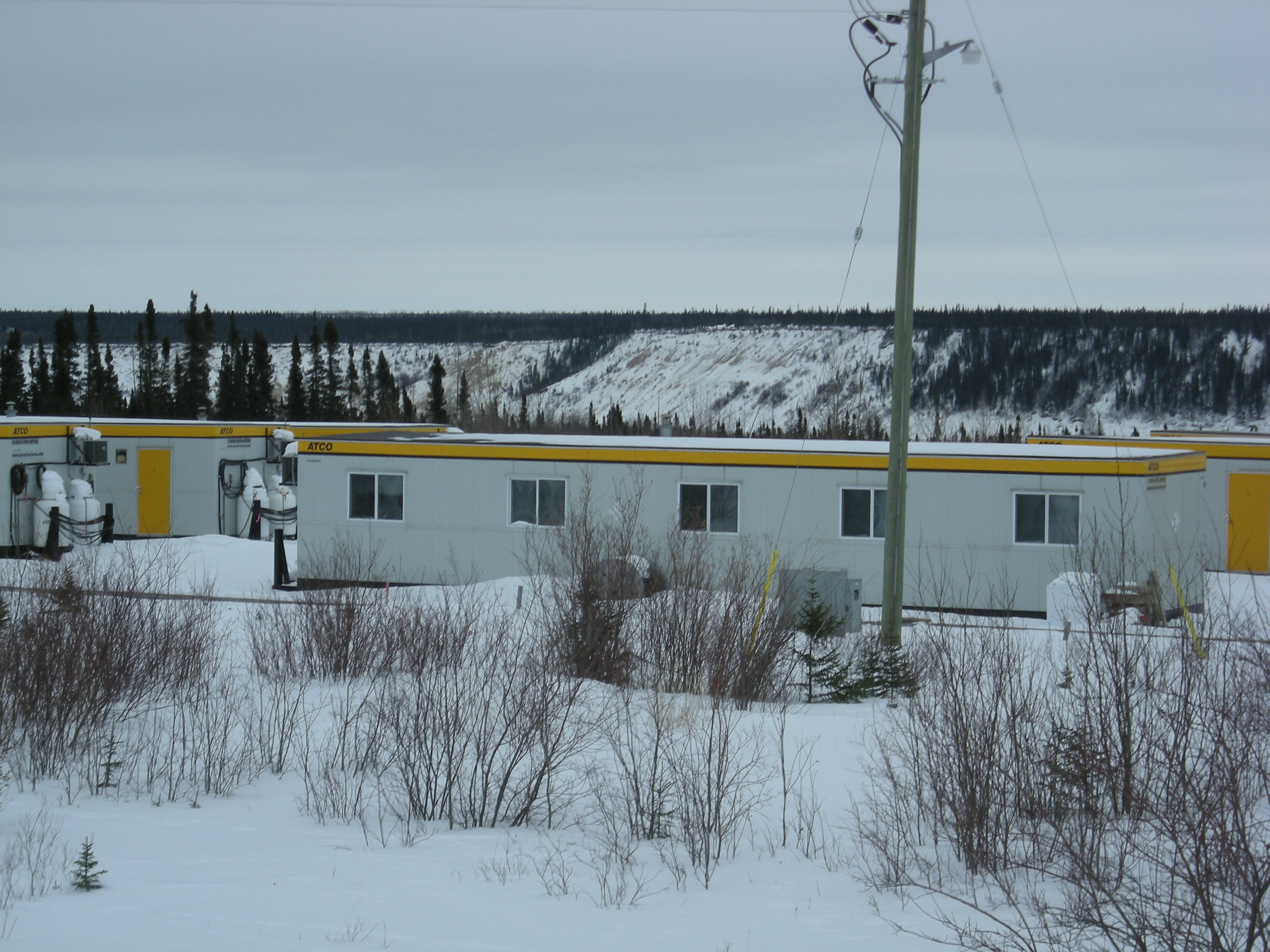
Service trailers at the northern terminus of PR 290

== History ==
PR 290 originally led to the abandoned town of Sundance. Sundance was organized in the 1980s with portable trailers for people building the Limestone Dam in northern Manitoba. PR 290 was assigned to a spur off PR 280 in 1989, running from PR 280 to Sundance. The trailers made up the elementary school, a few stores, a community centre and several homes. The town has been abandoned, and only empty lots and roads remain.

== Major intersections ==
Division	Location	km	mi	Destinations	Notes
Town of Gillam	Jacam	0.0	0.0	PR 280 – Gillam, Split Lake	Western terminus of PR 290; eastern terminus of PR 280.
Town of Gillam	Bird	20.8	12.9	Limestone Generating Station access road	Eastern terminus of PR 290
1.000 mi = 1.609 km; 1.000 km = 0.621 mi: Closed/former
