= Limestone River (Manitoba) =

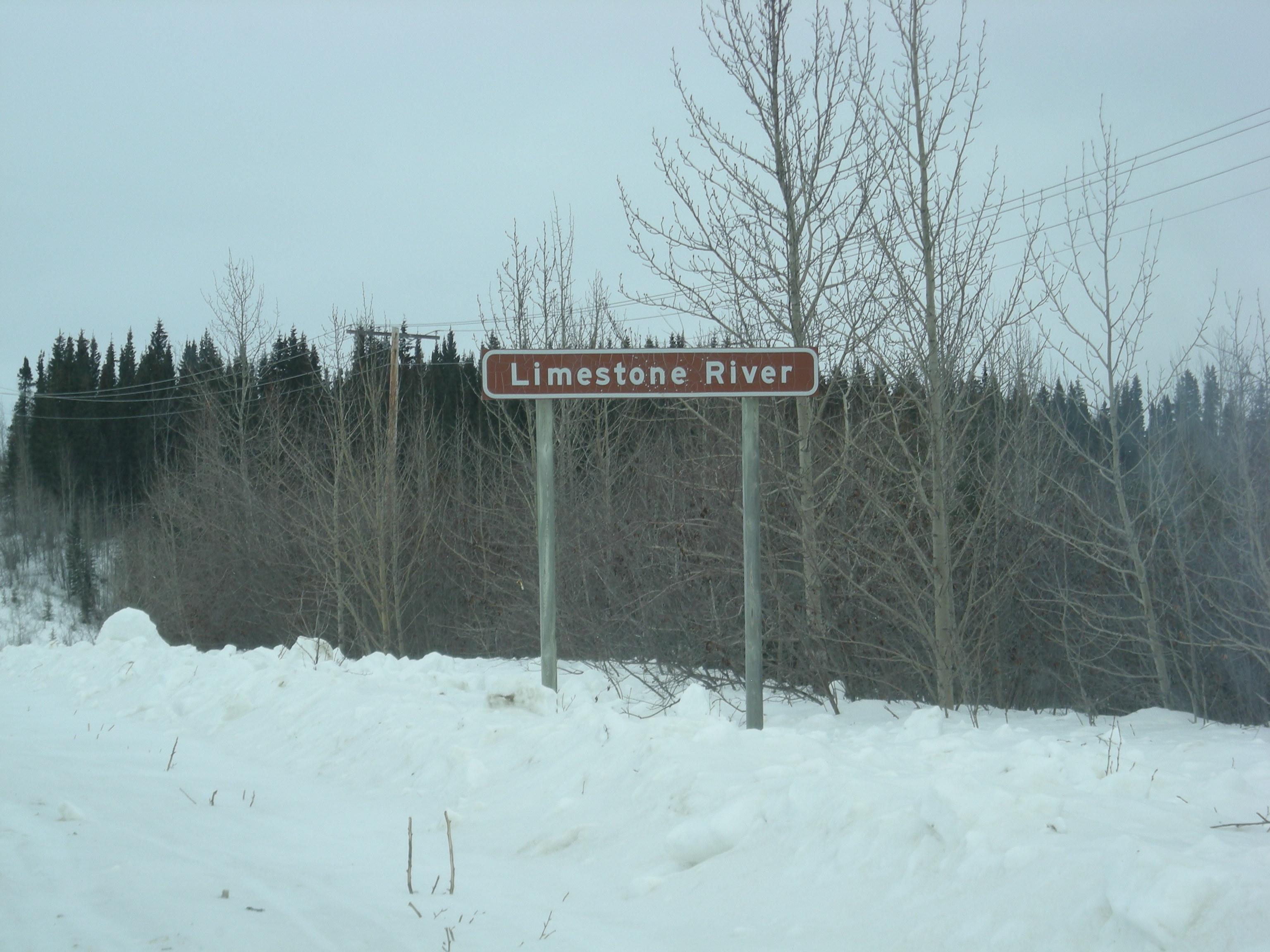
- Road sign for the Limestone River

- Location of the mouth of Limestone River

Location
- Country: Canada
- Province: Manitoba
- Region: Northern

Physical characteristics
- Source: Limestone Lake
  - coordinates: 56°36′34″N 95°50′54″W
  - elevation: 189 m (620 ft)
- Mouth: Nelson River
  - coordinates: 56°30′54″N 94°7′11″W
  - elevation: 56 m (184 ft)

Basin features
- River system: Hudson Bay drainage basin

The Limestone River is a river in the Hudson Bay drainage basin in Northern Manitoba, Canada. Its flows from Sakawisew Bay on Limestone Lake to the Nelson River, just downstream from Limestone Generating Station and dam and adjacent to the Fox Lake Cree Nation and to the abandoned community of Sundance.

== See also ==
- List of rivers of Manitoba
