= Limestone Lake =

Limestone Lake may refer to:

- Limestone Lake (British Columbia)
- Limestone Lake (Manitoba)
- Limestone Lake (Saskatchewan)

== See also ==
- Lake Limestone, a lake in Texas
