= 2019 Northern British Columbia murders =

Series of murders in Northern British Columbia, Canada

- Location: Northern British Columbia, Canada
- Date: July 14, 2019 – August 7, 2019
- Attack type: Shooting, spree killing, murder-suicide
- Weapon: Two SKS semi-automatic rifles (one of which was a ghost gun)
- Deaths: 5 (including both perpetrators)
- Victims: Lucas Fowler; Chynna Deese; Leonard Dyck
- Perpetrators: Kam McLeod; Bryer Schmegelsky
- Motive: Unknown

Between July 14–19, 2019, three people were killed in a spree shooting on the Alaska Highway and Stewart–Cassiar Highway in British Columbia, Canada. Kam McLeod and Bryer Schmegelsky are believed to have killed Lucas Fowler and Chynna Deese, before killing Leonard Dyck within a six-day time frame.

By July 23, 2019, McLeod and Schmegelsky allegedly traversed 3,200 km (2,000 mi) stretching across four Canadian provinces in ten days. A nationwide manhunt for the suspects was initiated by the Royal Canadian Mounted Police (RCMP). Between July 23 and August 7, McLeod and Schmegelsky used firearms to commit suicide near the Nelson River, northeast of Gillam, Manitoba.

== Details ==
=== Shootings ===
In the summer of 2019, 23-year-old Australian national Lucas Fowler and his girlfriend, 24-year-old American national Chynna Deese, were taking a three-week road trip around Canada. On July 14, their 1986 Chevrolet van broke down along the Alaska Highway, 20 km (12 mi) south of Liard Hot Springs in British Columbia. At approximately 3:20 PM PST, Curtis Broughton, a mechanic, along with his wife Sandra, stopped to check on the couple. Broughton explained, "They seemed like they kind of had it under control. It was mechanical issues with the van. They were having a picnic waiting for the van to unflood, I guess, and try to start it again". Broughton was assured that the couple knew what they were doing, and saw them "happy" and "smiling" before leaving them shortly after. At approximately 7:00 AM PST on July 15, the bodies of Fowler and Deese were discovered by Trevor Pierre, a highway worker.

Both victims were found in a ditch close to their van, with their bodies showing visible gunshot wounds and lying 5 m (16 ft) apart from one another. Both were lying north, with their heads facing west. The van's back doors were left open with their windows smashed, according to Pierre. On July 19, a burnt-out pickup truck was discovered south of the Stikine River Bridge on Highway 37. The body of 64-year-old Vancouver resident Leonard Dyck was found 2 km (1.2 mi) south of the vehicle fire, with "similar circumstances" as Fowler and Deese (whose bodies were found 470 km (290 mi) away).

Two male Port Alberni residents, 19-year-old Kam McLeod and 18-year-old Bryer Schmegelsky, were initially reported as missing persons, as it was revealed that they were operating the pickup truck before it was destroyed. On July 22, the Royal Canadian Mounted Police (RCMP) believed there was a possible link between the missing persons and murder victims in British Columbia.

The initial reports of the murders in northern British Columbia prompted confusion among some foreign media outlets, which incorrectly identified the murders as taking place on or near the infamous Highway of Tears, which has been the site of numerous disappearances and murders of Indigenous women.

=== Manhunt ===
On July 23, a burning Toyota RAV4 was found near Fox Lake Cree Nation, north of Gillam, Manitoba, believed to be driven by the missing pair. Following this discovery, the RCMP sought second-degree murder charges against McLeod and Schmegelsky in relation to the British Columbia killings. After the case received nationwide attention, a resident of Cold Lake, Alberta, reported helping two younger males who had their RAV4 stuck on July 21. Later that same day, the pair was captured by video surveillance at a store in Meadow Lake, Saskatchewan, the footage of which was turned in to the police days later.

Eyewitnesses recalled spotting McLeod and Schmegelsky twice in the Gillam area on July 22. On the same day, the pair were stopped for a routine alcohol check by Tataskweyak Cree Nation band constables in Split Lake, Manitoba. They were eventually released, marking the interaction with band constables as the last confirmed sighting of the suspects as of July 22.

By July 24, the RCMP deployed the Emergency Response Team, a crisis negotiation team, air services and canine units to Gillam and its surrounding area. A checkpoint was set up at the intersection of Provincial Roads 280 and 290, with heavily armed officers canvassing the area. The RCMP acknowledged the 'inhospitable' environment with dense forests, swampy terrain, and wild animals. After almost a week of unsuccessful search attempts in Gillam, the RCMP received a new tip on July 28: Travis Bighetty and Justin Coelho, of the Indigenous Bear Clan Patrol, had spotted two people with "matching descriptions" of the fugitives at the York Landing community landfill, 200 kilometres southwest.

By July 29, the RCMP reported that they were unable to locate the suspects, but cautioned the public about their continued presence in the Gillam and York Landing communities. On July 30, Northeast Ontario Provincial Police (OPP) received a report of two suspicious men with matching descriptions of McLeod and Schmegelsky near Iron Bridge, east of Sault Ste. Marie, Ontario. On July 31 at 10:30 AM, OPP James Bay Detachment was notified that the fugitives might have been travelling eastbound in a white vehicle on Highway 11 near Kapuskasing, carrying a firearm. Officers could not locate the subjects in either incident. On the same day, nine days after the manhunt began, Manitoba RCMP announced that despite inspecting over 11,000 square kilometres and searching more than 500 homes in Gillam, York Landing and their surroundings it had been unable to locate the suspects and so was "scaling back" its search operation. By August 1, more unconfirmed locations of the suspects had been reported to the OPP including Sudbury, West Nipissing, North Bay and Parry Sound.

A breakthrough came on August 2 when Gillam-based tour guide Clint Sawchuk reported to the RCMP that he saw a blue sleeping bag at the edge of the Nelson River, near the entrance to Hudson Bay. On August 6, the RCMP announced it found several items believed to belong to the suspects on the shore of the river. A fresh search of the river by the RCMP on August 3 found a damaged rowboat below the Lower Limestone Rapids, about 65 km north-east of Gillam. Near the rowboat were some other items which the RCMP linked to the suspects. This location was 9 km (5.6 mi) north-east of where the burnt RAV4 had been found on July 23. An underwater search by the RCMP close to where the rowboat was found did not find anything further.

On August 7, RCMP in northern Manitoba reported that they believed they had found the bodies of the fugitives in thick bush close to the Nelson River, about 1 km (0.62 mi) west of where the damaged rowboat was found. By August 12, an autopsy report from Winnipeg confirmed that the two bodies found belonged to the wanted suspects and that they died of self-inflicted gunshot wounds. The pair recorded a series of videos prior to committing suicide, in which they confessed to the murders. They gave no motive and expressed no remorse for the killings.

== Response ==
On July 26, a formal request from RCMP commissioner Brenda Lucki was approved by Minister of Public Safety Ralph Goodale and Defense Minister Harjit Sajjan for assistance in locating the perpetrators. By July 27, an RCAF 435 Transport and Rescue Squadron CC-130H Hercules aircraft was deployed from Winnipeg for aerial reconnaissance to the Gillam area, while following RCMP requests. The aircraft utilized its thermal imaging equipment in the search, with negative results.

On July 27, 2019, an Indigenous-led neighbourhood watch group arrived in Gillam at the request of the Assembly of Manitoba Chiefs. They offered volunteer support and services to the residents of the town, amid the high-risk manhunt in the area.

The manhunt sparked the creation of Facebook groups theorizing the suspects' next moves. It also caused online trolls to emerge, tease the police and encourage the suspects in evading search efforts; one of those went by the alias Thomasabrahamutoyo and alleged that the suspects were his friends and taunted that they are "smarter than you think".

The murders and the aftermath inspired Wayne Wapeemukwa's 2026 film Manhunt.

== See also ==
- List of solved missing person cases (post-2000)
- List of unsolved murders (2000–present)
