= Stephens Lake (Manitoba) =

Lake in Manitoba, Canada

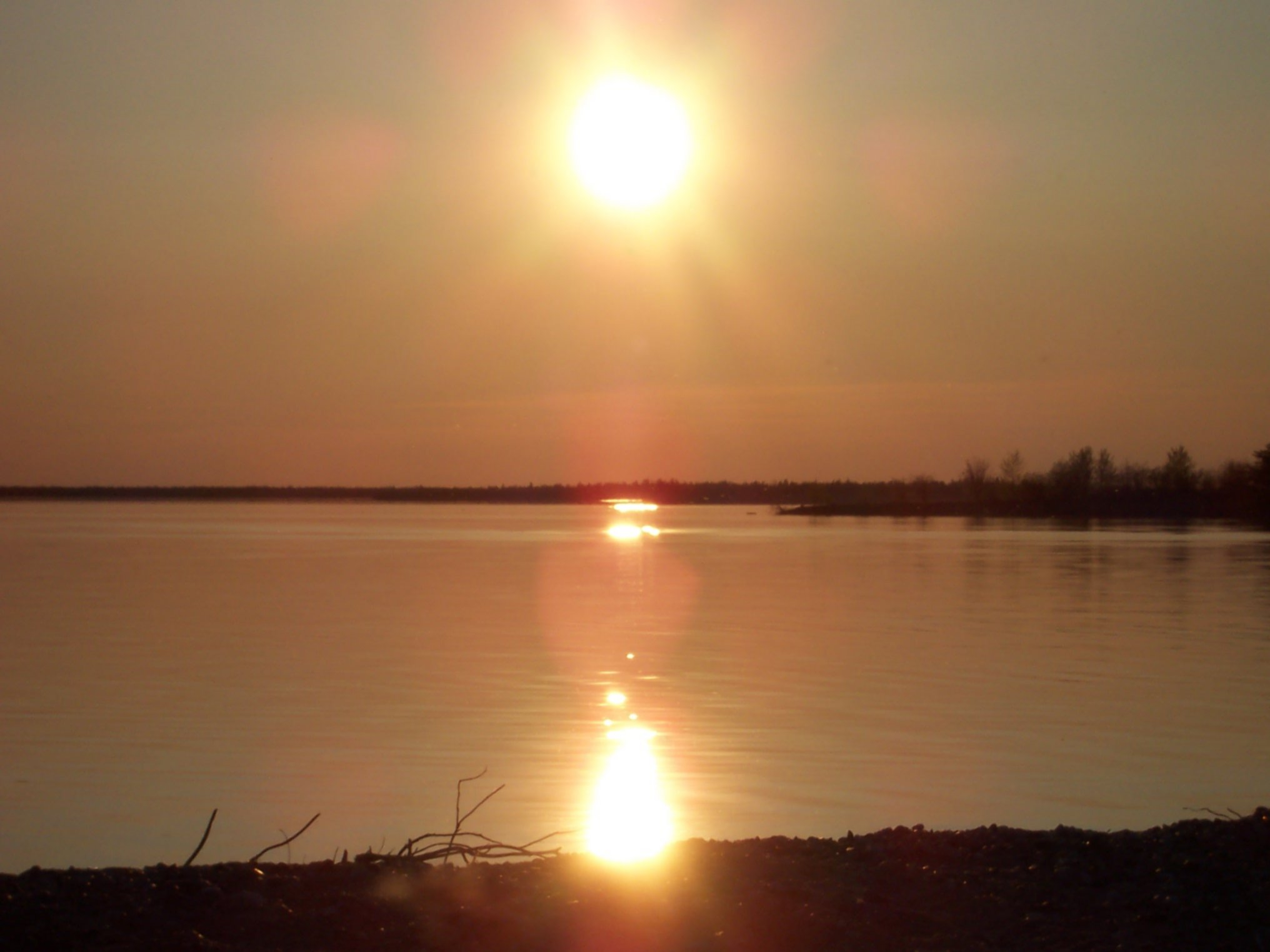
- Stephens Lake from Manitoba Road 280

- Location of the lake in Manitoba Stephens Lake (Canada)
- Location: Division No. 23, Manitoba
- Coordinates: 56°25′58″N 95°7′1″W
- Primary inflows: Nelson River
- Primary outflows: Nelson River
- Basin countries: Canada
- Max. length: 32 km (20 mi)
- Settlements: Gillam

Stephens Lake is a reservoir in the province of Manitoba in Canada north of Lake Winnipeg. The reservoir was created in 1971 by the Kettle Dam and received its official name of Stephens Lake in 1972. The lake is 32 kilometres (20 mi) long from the inflow of the Nelson River to the outflow at the Kettle Dam reaching roughly 23–31 m (75–102 ft) in the deepest parts. The lake is located 45 kilometres (28 mi) northeast of Split Lake and 150 kilometres (93 mi) west of the Hudson Bay.

The Kettle Generating Station, Long Spruce Generating Station, and Limestone Generating Station dams are located downstream on the Nelson River. Gillam is located on the southeastern shore of the Lake. The lake and the town of Gillam are accessed by Manitoba Provincial Road 280.

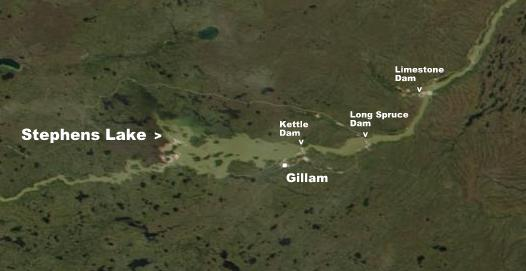
Stephens Lake on the Nelson River

== See also ==
- List of lakes of Manitoba
