= Henday Converter Station =

Converter station

Coordinates: 56°30′14″N 94°08′24″W

Henday Converter Station is an HVDC converter station near Sundance in the Canadian province of Manitoba.

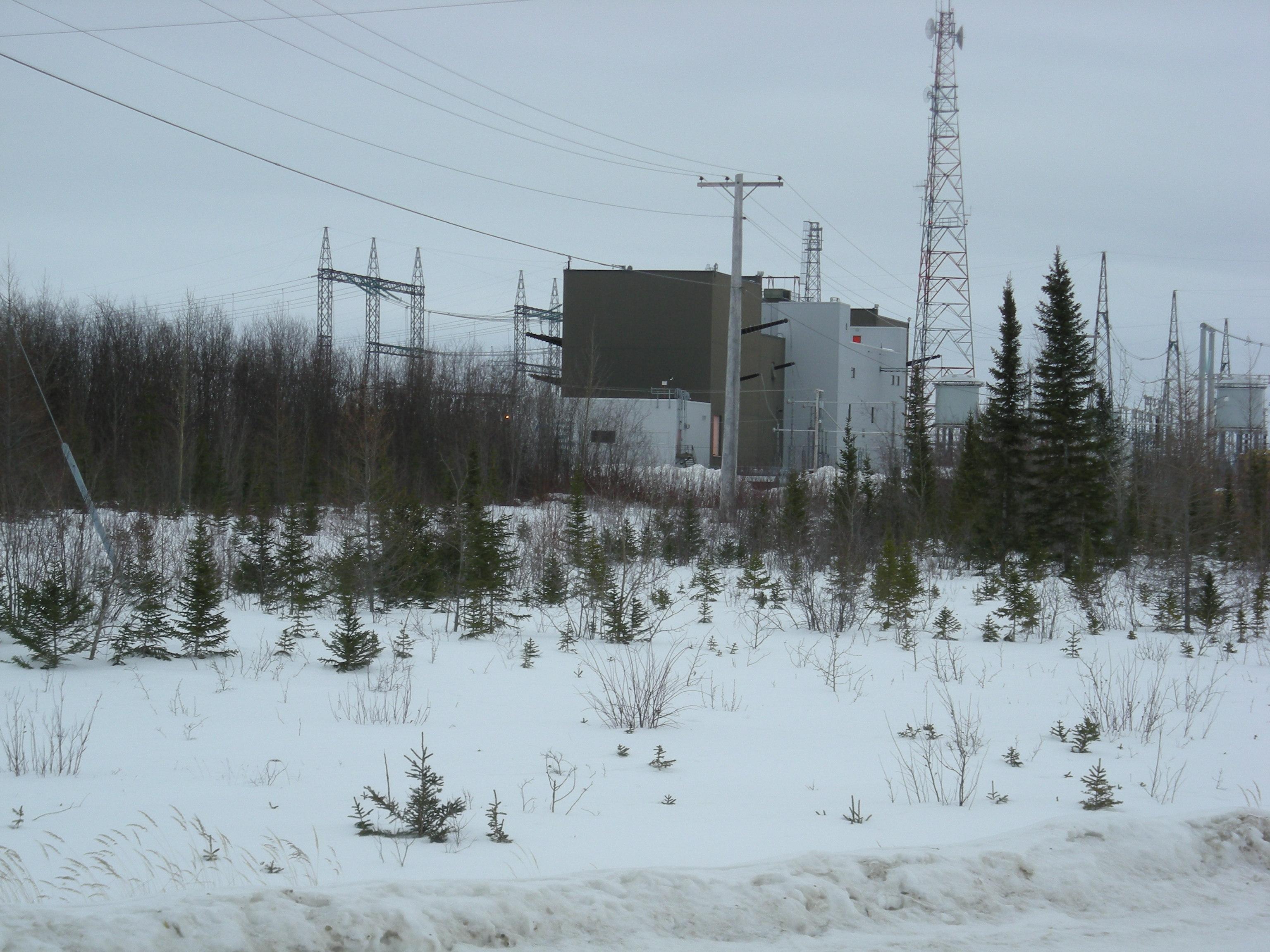
Henday Converter Station near Sundance, Manitoba.

The Henday Converter Station is the northern terminus for Manitoba Hydro's Bipole II high voltage direct current (HVDC) transmission system and was built in 1977. It is 42 kilometres northeast of the Radisson Converter Station and is close to the Limestone Generating Station.

It was named after Anthony Henday, an eighteenth-century trader who worked for the Hudson's Bay Company.
