= Nelson River DC Transmission System =

Electric power transmission system

NR HVDC Transmission Bipole 1
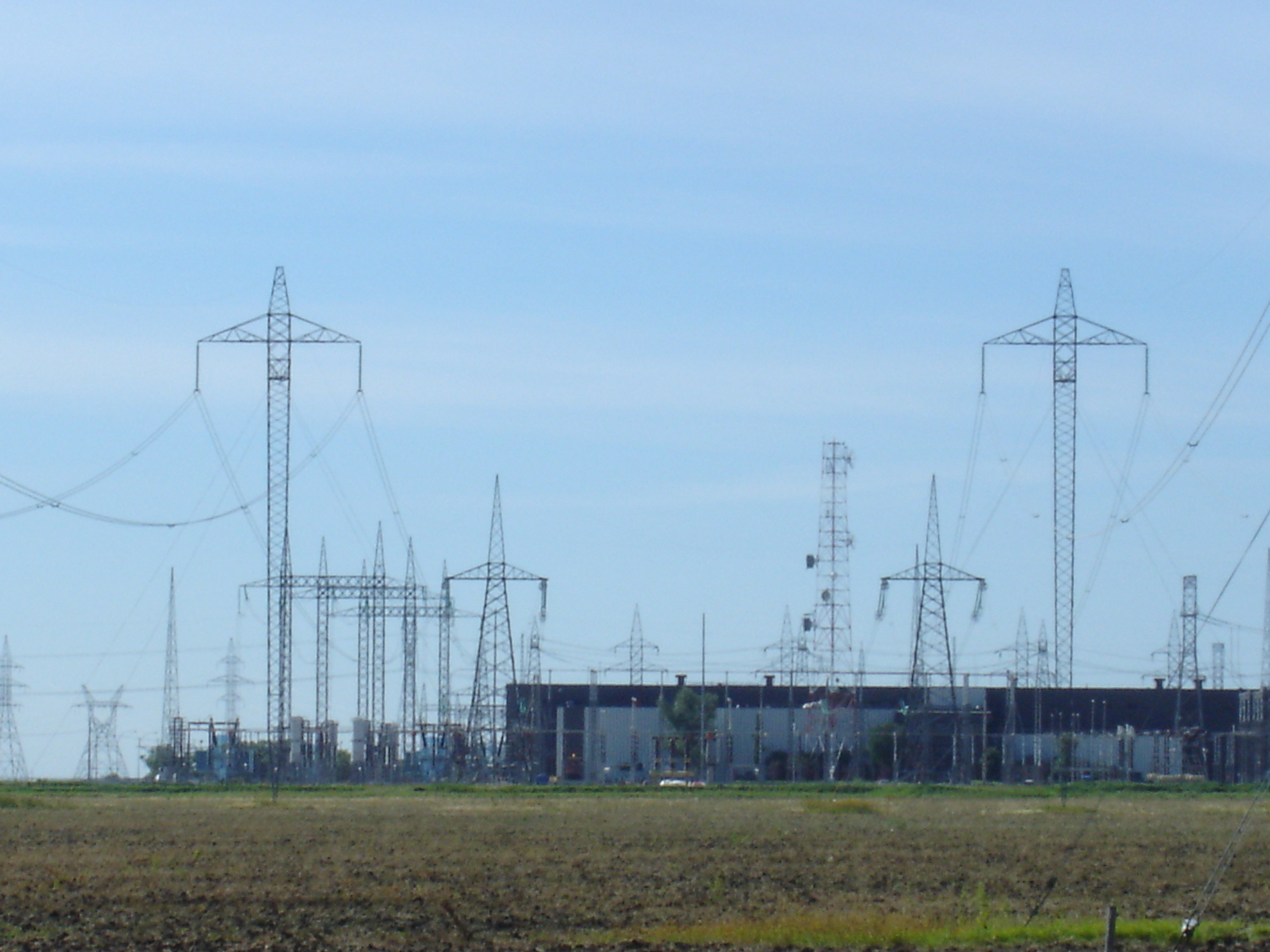
- Nelson River Bipoles 1 and 2 terminate at Dorsey Converter Station near Rosser, Manitoba. The station takes HVDC current and converts it to HVAC current for re-distribution to consumers

- Map of Bipoles 1 and 2

Location
- Country: Canada
- Province: Manitoba
- From: Radisson Converter Station near Gillam at 56°21′39″N 94°36′47″W
- To: Dorsey Converter Station at Rosser located 26 kilometres (16 mi) north west of Winnipeg at 49°59′39″N 97°25′38″W)

Ownership information
- Owner: Manitoba Hydro
- Operator: Manitoba Hydro

Construction information
- Substation manufacturer: English Electric (original); Alstom, Siemens (replacement)
- Construction started: 1966
- Commissioned: June 17, 1972

Technical information
- Type: overhead transmission line
- Current type: HVDC
- Total length: 895 km (556 mi)
- Capacity: 1,620 megawatts 1,800 Amperes
- DC voltage: ±450 kilovolts
- No. of poles: 2
- No. of circuits: 1

The Nelson River DC Transmission System, also known as the Manitoba Bipole, is an electric power transmission system of three high voltage, direct current lines in Manitoba, Canada, operated by Manitoba Hydro as part of the Nelson River Hydroelectric Project. It is now recorded on the list of IEEE Milestones in electrical engineering. Several records have been broken by successive phases of the project, including the largest (and last) mercury-arc valves, the highest DC transmission voltage and the first use of water-cooled thyristor valves in HVDC.

The system transfers electric power generated by several hydroelectric power stations along the Nelson River in Northern Manitoba across the wilderness to the populated areas in the south.

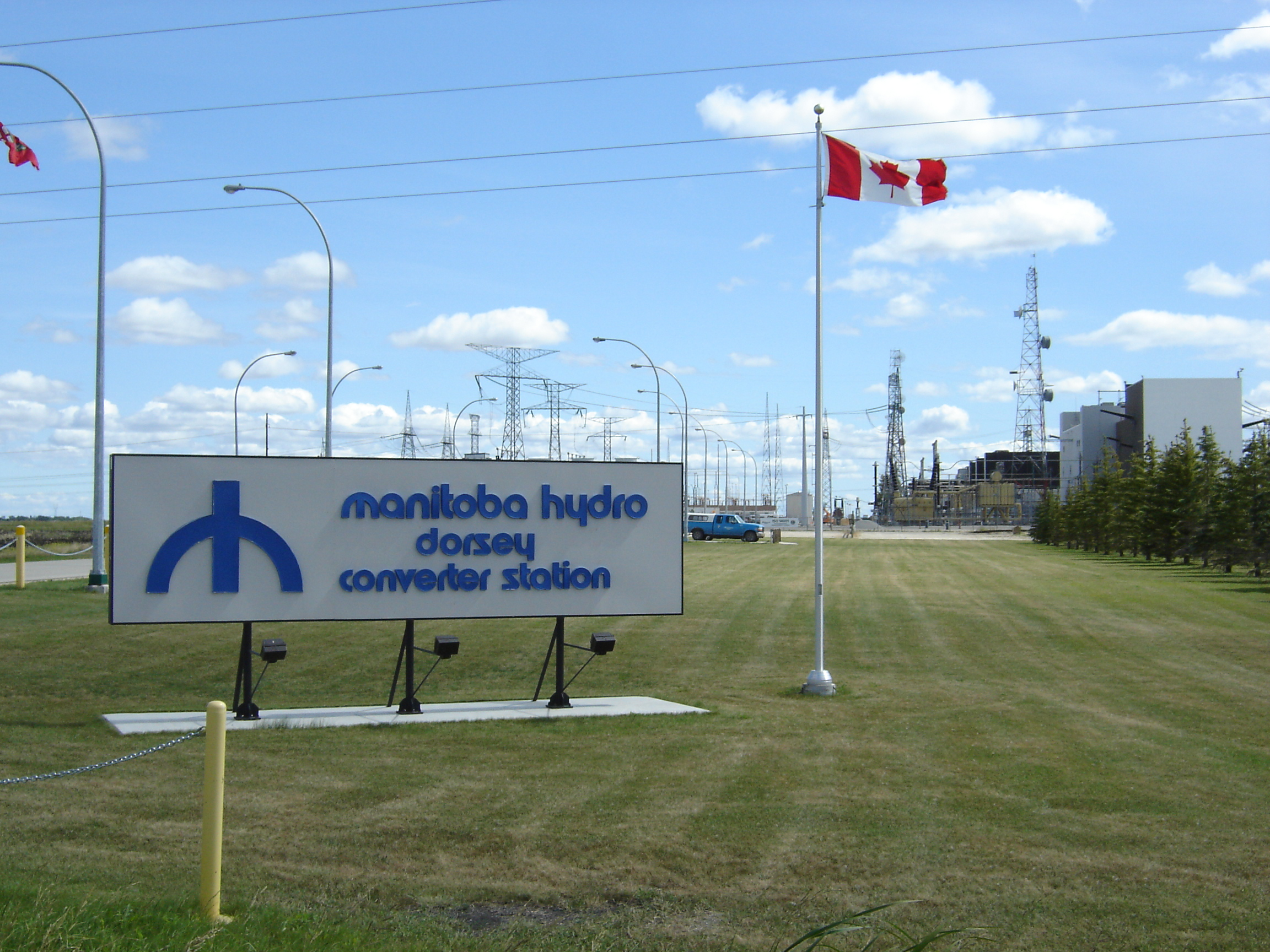
Dorsey Converter Station near Rosser, Manitoba – August, 2005

It includes two rectifier stations, Radisson Converter Station near Gillam at 56°21′41″N 94°36′48″W and Henday Converter Station near Sundance at 56°30′14″N 94°08′24″W, one inverter station, Dorsey Converter Station at Rosser located 26 kilometres (16 mi) north west of Winnipeg at 49°59′34″N 97°25′42″W), and two sets of high-voltage direct current transmission lines. Each HVDC transmission line has two parallel overhead conductors to carry the positive and negative feeds.

A third line, Bipole 3, was completed in 2018, running from the new Keewatinohk Converter Station along the west side of Lake Manitoba to the new Riel Converter station on the east side of Winnipeg.

There are no intermediate switching stations or taps. All three bipolar systems have extensive ground return electrodes to allow use in monopolar mode.

== History ==
Construction in 1966 of the 1,272 MW Kettle Rapids generating station required a long transmission line to connect it to load centers in the southern part of Manitoba. The Government of Canada agreed to finance installation of an HVDC line to be repaid by Manitoba Hydro when the load growth permitted the utility to assume the debt due to the line. Delivery of direct current electric power began on June 17, 1972.

One unit of the Kettle generating station was completed before the direct current converters were completed. For the winter of 1970 the bipole lines were energized with alternating current, contributing a useful amount of energy to the Manitoba system; a shunt reactor was installed to prevent excess voltage rise due to the Ferranti effect.

At that time, Bipole I used the world's highest operating voltage to deliver the largest amount of power from a remote site to a city, and employed the largest mercury arc valves ever developed for such an application. The line required construction of over 3,900 guyed towers and 96 self-supporting towers across varied terrain. Permafrost in some areas led to foundation settling of up to 3 feet (1 m).

The loan by the Government of Canada was discharged when Manitoba Hydro bought the line and outstanding debt in 1992. In 1997 a tornado damaged 19 towers of the DC lines. During repairs, some major customers were advised to curtail load, but imports over the 500 kV lines from adjacent utilities in the United States prevented serious interruption of power.

A third such line, called Bipole 3 was proposed, to run along the west side of Manitoba. On October 26, 2009, the Canadian Taxpayers Federation, along with engineering and environmental experts, released an analysis which they claimed refuted each of the government's claims for why the line must be built down the west side of the province. The line was constructed on the western route and completed in 2018.

== System components ==
The transmission system is currently composed of three bipole transmission lines with their converter stations and ground return electrodes to enable monopole operation.

=== Bipole 1 ===
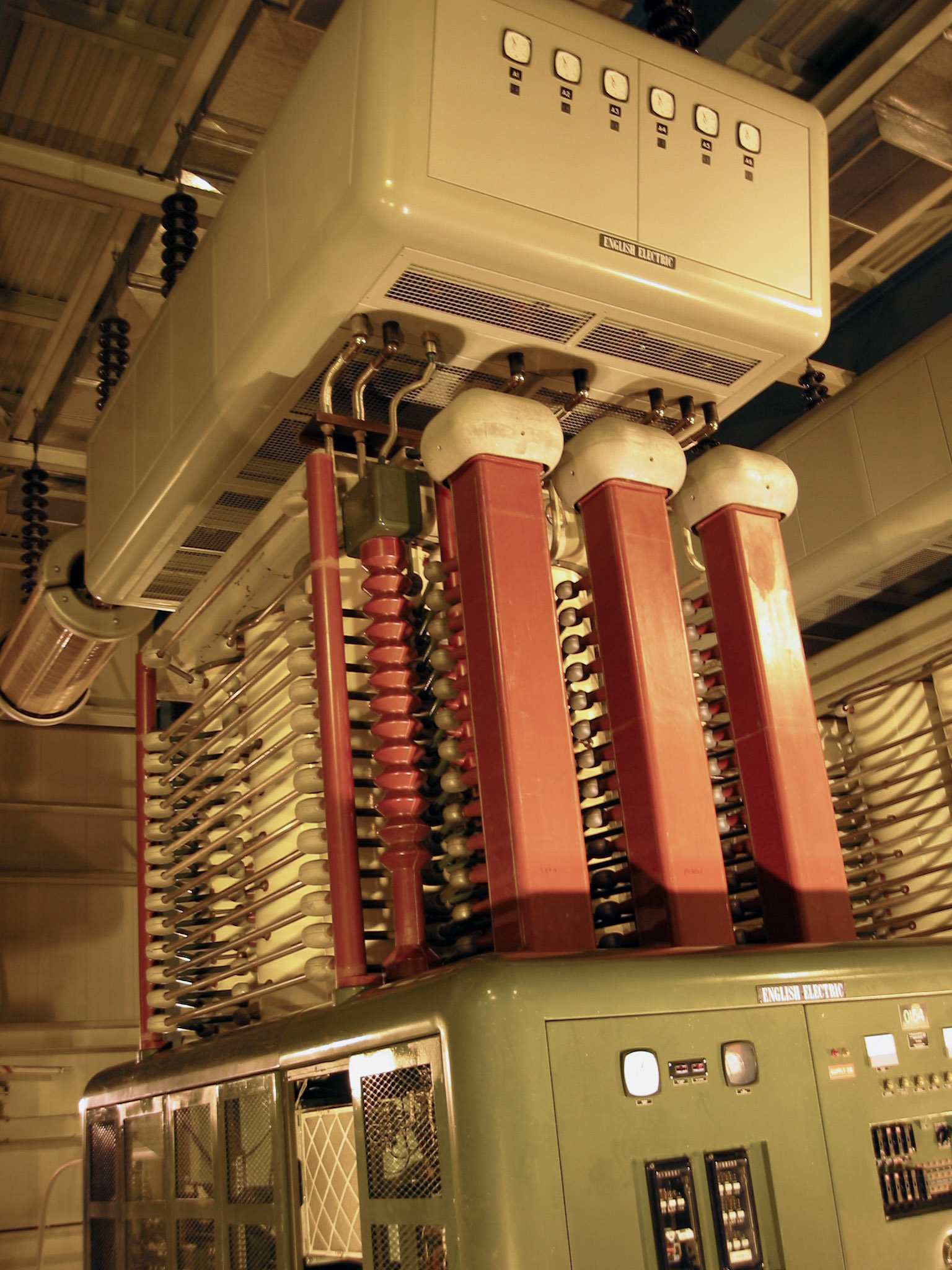
A 150 kV mercury arc valve in Bipole 1 of Manitoba Hydro's Radisson converter station, August 2003. By the end of 2004 all of these mercury arc valves had been replaced with solid state thyristors.

Bipole 1 runs 895 kilometres (556 mi) from Radisson to Dorsey. It was originally rated to run at a maximum potential difference of ±450 kilovolts and a maximum power of 1620 megawatts. This results in an electric current of 1800 amperes.

Bipole 1 consists of six 6-pulse converter groups at each end (three in series per pole), each originally rated at 150 kV DC, 1800 A. Each converter group can be bridged at the DC side with a vacuum switch. Subsequent upgrades have increased the current rating to 2000 A and the voltage rating of most equipment to 166 kV per bridge (i.e., 500 kV total), although as of January 2013 Manitoba Hydro still report that the line is operated at +463 kV/−450 kV.

When it was built between March 1971 and October 1977, mercury-arc valves were used to rectify the alternating current. These valves, supplied by English Electric, each had six anode columns in parallel and were the most powerful mercury arc valves ever built. Each of them had a weight of 10.2 tonnes (22,500 lb), a length of 4.6 metres (15 ft), a width of 2.4 metres (8 ft) and a height of 4.0 metres (13 ft). Between 1992 and 1993 the mercury arc valves of Pole 1 were replaced with solid state thyristors from GEC Alsthom, increasing the maximum power and voltage of the line to its current levels. The mercury arc valves of Pole 2 were replaced later by Siemens. By the end of 2004 the last of the mercury arc valves in Pole 2 had been replaced by thyristors.

At both Radisson and Dorsey, the thyristors are situated in the same hall where the mercury arc valves originally stood. At both locations, the hall has a height of 18 metres (60 ft), a width of 23 metres (75 ft) and a length of 44 metres (145 ft).

=== Bipole 2 ===
NR HVDC Transmission Bipole 2

Location
- From: Henday Converter Station near Sundance ^{Bipole 2} at 56°30′15″N 94°08′26″W
- To: Dorsey Converter Station at Rosser ^{Bipoles 1 and 2} at 49°59′39″N 97°25′49″W

Ownership information
- Owner: Manitoba Hydro
- Operator: Manitoba Hydro

Construction information
- Substation manufacturer: Siemens, AEG, Brown Boveri
- Commissioned: 1985

Technical information
- Type: overhead transmission line
- Current type: HVDC
- Total length: 937 km (582 mi)
- Capacity: 1,800 megawatts
- DC voltage: ±500 kV
- No. of poles: 2
- No. of circuits: 1

The Bipole 2 transmission line runs 937 kilometres (582 mi) from Henday to Dorsey. Bipole 2 can transfer a maximum power of 1800 MW at a potential of ±500 kV. Bipole 2 consists of four 12-pulse converter groups at each end (two in series per pole) and was put into service in two stages. After the first stage in 1978 the maximum power was 900 MW at 250 kV, which increased to its present figure when it was completed in 1985.

Bipole 2 crosses Nelson River at 56.459811 N 94.143273 W. There is a backup crossing of Nelson River at 56.441383 N 94.176114 W. It is not possible to directly switch the line to the backup crossing.

Unlike Bipole 1, Bipole 2 has always been equipped with thyristors. The thyristors, supplied by the German HVDC consortium (Siemens, AEG and Brown Boveri) used water cooling for the first time in an HVDC project. Until that time, the relatively few HVDC schemes using thyristors had used either air cooling or, as on the Cahora Bassa project supplied by the same consortium, oil-cooling. The thyristors were arranged in floor-mounted vertical stacks of four each (quadrivalves). Each set contained 96 thyristor levels in series, with two in parallel. These were arranged in 16 thyristor modules connected in series with 8 reactor modules.

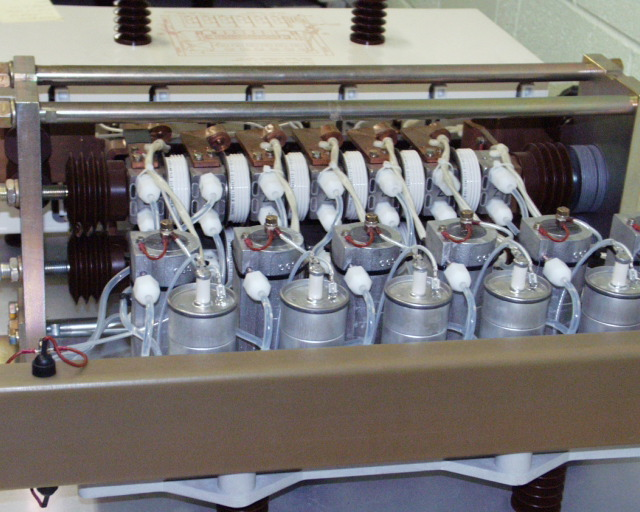
The Bipole 2 thyristors: Six parallel-connected pairs of thyristors in a module, with cooling piping and voltage grading capacitors.

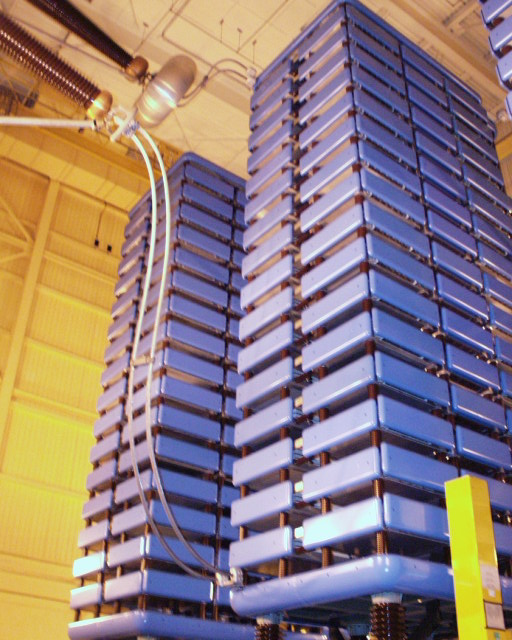
An 1800 A 250 kV quadruple thyristor set in Bipole 2 of the Henday Converter Station

=== Bipole 3 ===
In 1996 an extreme wind effect damaged both Bipoles 1 and 2 and threatened to black out Winnipeg. Power was maintained by importing from Minnesota while the two existing Bipoles were repaired. To avoid a repetition of this event, and further improve the reliability of the power supply, Manitoba Hydro examined routes further to the west for their Bipole 3 line. The plans also include an additional converter station and feeder lines around the city. Bipole 3 construction started in 2012. The line was completed and entered service in July 2018.

The main elements of the Bipole III system are:

- Keewatinohk Converter Station, located on the Nelson River near the site of the proposed Conawapa Generating Station at 56°39′25″N 93°51′14″W
- A 1,324 km bipolar transmission line operating at nominally +/-500 kV, running to the West of Lake Manitoba
- Riel Converter Station, on the east side of the Winnipeg Floodway, in the Rural Municipality of Springfield at 49°51′59″N 96°56′24″W
- Additional 230 kV AC lines for the northern collector system.

The line uses guyed steel towers in northern stretches of the line and self-supporting steel lattice towers in the southern part. On average there will be about two structures per kilometre. Each tower carries a bundled conductor for each pole. Each pole conductor is made of three sub-conductors equivalent to 1,590 MCM ACSR. Conductors are supported by toughened glass or porcelain strain insulators with a maximum clearance to ground level of 34 metres, with a minimum of 13.2 metres at mid span and maximum conductor sag. The top of the towers carries an optical ground cable providing grounding interconnection for the towers and optical fibers for control and communication of the system.

Typically the right-of-way for the HVDC line is 66 metres, with 45 metres cleared directly below the line.

The system is capable of transmitting 2000 megawatts from the Nelson River stations to loads in the south.

=== Ground return electrodes ===
Although normally each of the lines run as bipolar systems, if a pole is shut down for maintenance or a fault, the ground return electrode is used to maintain partial capacity operation.

Bipoles 1 and 2 share a ground electrode of ring type, 305 metres (1,001 ft) in diameter, 21.9 kilometres (13.6 mi) from the Dorsey Converter Plant at 50°10′29″N 97°24′08″W. The Dorsey electrode is connected with the converter plant by two overhead lines on wooden poles, one for Bipole 1 and one for Bipole 2.

At Radisson, Bipole 1 uses a ground electrode of the same size and type as Dorsey, but only 11.2 kilometres (7.0 mi) away from the station at 56°21′22″N 94°45′17″W.

Bipole 2 uses a ground electrode 548 metres (1,798 ft) in diameter, and 11.2 kilometres (7.0 mi) from the Henday Converter Station 56°26′2″N 94°13′22″W.

Bipole 3 has a ground electrode site near the Keewatinohk Converter Station at 56°34′56″N 93°57′02″W connected by a 30 km electrode line. At the southern Riel Converter Station, the electrode line runs about 26 km to a grounding electrode site at 49°56′12″N 96°43′01″W near Hazelridge, Manitoba.

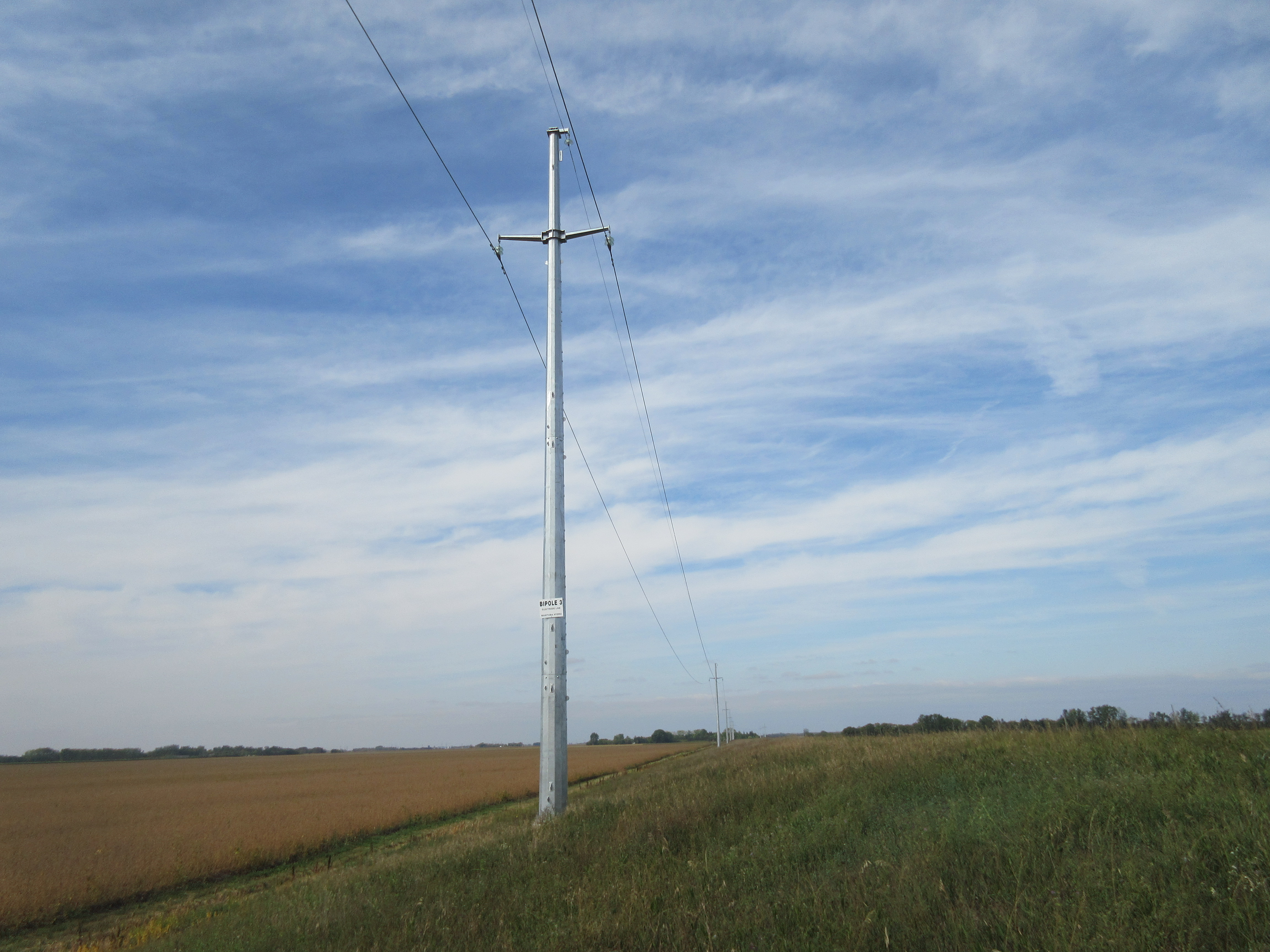
Bipole III electrode ground line north of Dugald, Manitoba.
