= Sundance, Manitoba =

Sundance
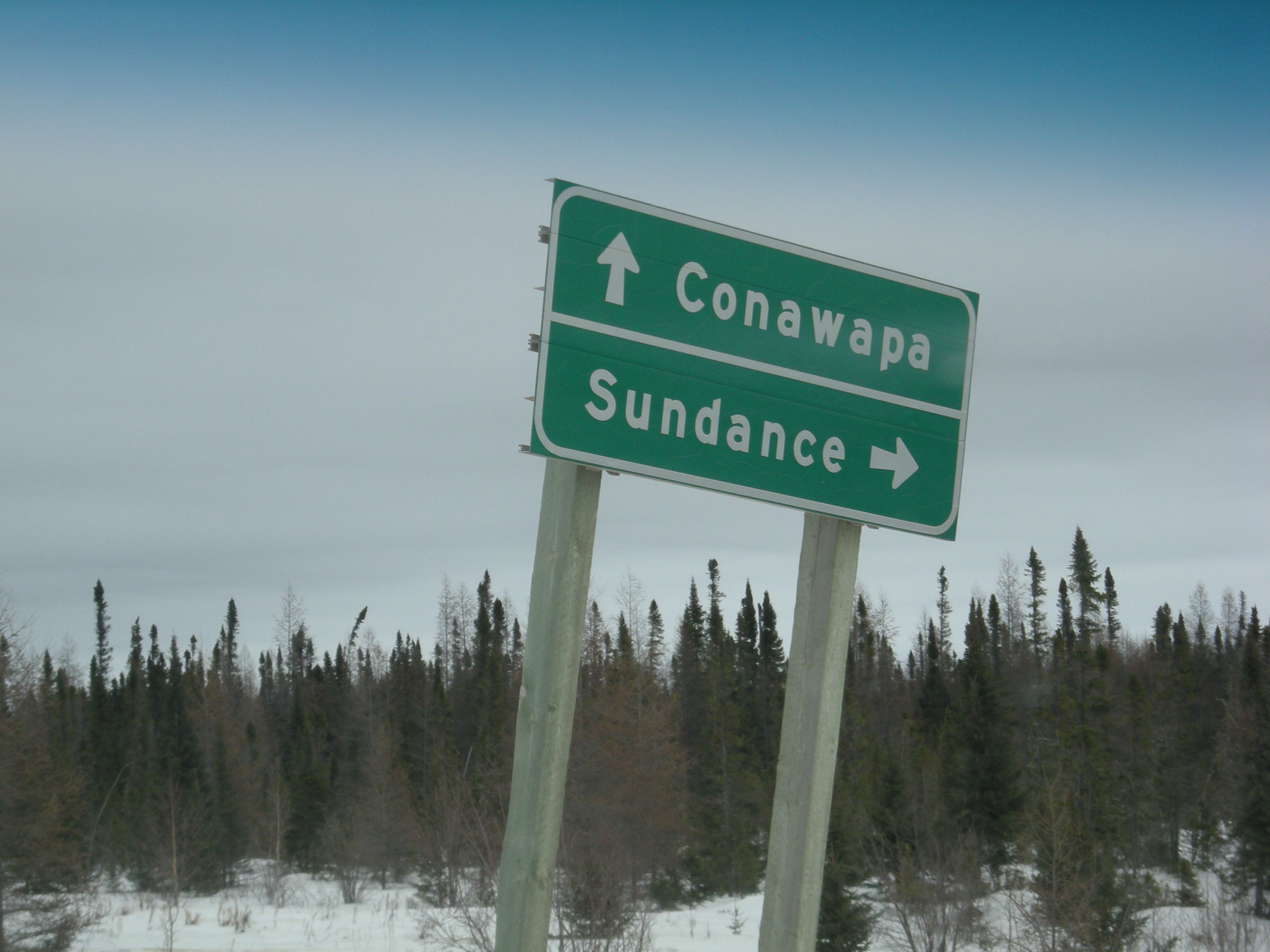
- Sundance, Manitoba road sign

- Location of Sundance in Manitoba
- Coordinates: 56°32′3″N 94°4′20″W
- Country: Canada
- Province: Manitoba
- Region: Northern
- Census Division: No. 23

Government
  - MP: Rebecca Chartrand
  - MLA: Judy Klassen
- Time zone: UTC−6 (CST)
  - Summer (DST): UTC−5 (CDT)
- Area code: 204
- NTS Map: 054D09
- GNBC Code: GBBAE

Sundance was a community near the Nelson River in Northern Manitoba that was constructed starting in 1975 to house the workers (and families) of the Limestone Dam project, who were employees of Manitoba Hydro, GE, and other companies. Sundance was shut down from November 1978 to early 1985 while the Limestone Generating Station construction was put on temporary hiatus. The town was mostly trailers and portable buildings with an elementary school, grocery store, community centre & a few other small stores. Sundance was de-commissioned in September 1992 at the completion of the Limestone Generating Station Project.

Google Maps satellite imagery shows that the town no longer exists and only empty lots and streets remain. The closest towns are Gillam, Thompson, Bird (Indigenous reserve), Fox Lake (Indigenous Reserve), Amery, and Churchill, Manitoba. Today it is located within the limits of the very large Town of Gillam, the largest "town" in Manitoba by area.

This town is the unofficial "northern" terminus for Provincial Road 290. Henday Converter Station of Nelson River Bipole 2 is also there.

== Murder suspect ==
CBC's The Fifth Estate ran a program about the murder of Andrea Sherpf and Bernd Goehricke. One of the suspects, Andrew "Andy" Rose lived in Sundance for 3 years starting in August 1986.
