= Gillam, Manitoba =

Town in Manitoba, Canada

Gillam
- Town
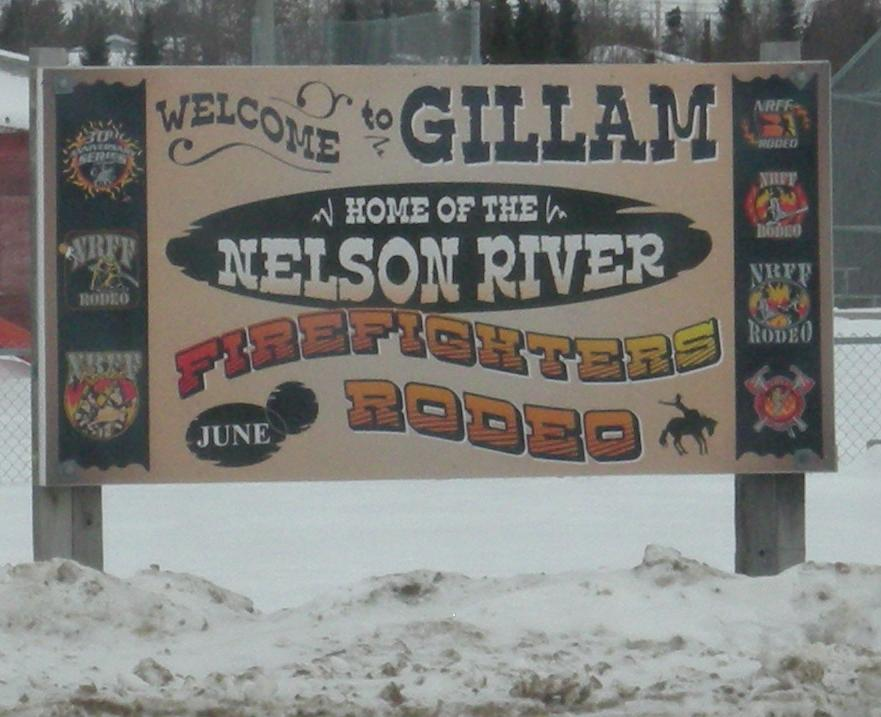
- Welcome sign at Gillam

- Gillam in Manitoba Gillam in Canada
- Coordinates: 56°20′50″N 94°42′28″W
- Country: Canada
- Province: Manitoba
- Region: Northern
- Census division: 23

Government
  - Type: Town Council
  - Mayor: Dwayne Forman
  - MLA: Eric Redhead

Area
  - Total: 1,996.34 km^{2} (770.79 sq mi)
- Elevation: 145 m (476 ft)

Population (2016)
  - Total: 1,265
  - Density: 0.6/km^{2} (1.6/sq mi)
- Time zone: UTC−6 (CST)
  - Summer (DST): UTC−5 (DST)
- Postal code: R0B
- Area codes: 204 and 431
- Website: www.townofgillam.com

Gillam is a town on the Nelson River in northern Manitoba, Canada. It is situated between Thompson and Churchill on the Hudson Bay Railway line.

Many residents of Gillam are employed by Manitoba Hydro at one of their many facilities or support groups. Located within Gillam's boundaries, Hydro has four hydro dams—Kettle Generating Station, Long Spruce Generating Station, Limestone Generating Station (the largest in Manitoba) and Keeyask (in construction)—three HVDC stations—Radisson, Henday, and Keewatinohk—and a few support groups.

== History ==
The large Gillam Local Government District (56°27′30″N 94°12′30″W) was established by the Manitoba government in the mid-1960s to facilitate development of hydroelectricity on the lower Nelson River. At 1,996.346 square kilometres (770.793 sq mi), Gillam is considered to be the 9th largest city or town in Canada by area, although the majority of the encompassing area of the District is largely uninhabited and undeveloped, but filled with many lakes, rivers and large forests of pine trees. It is the largest town in Manitoba, and one of four extremely large "towns" (the other three are Leaf Rapids, Snow Lake, and Lynn Lake) in northern Manitoba that, although technically towns, are mostly rural and are the size of most typical counties in the United States or eastern Canada.

Gillam is also the home of Fox Lake Cree Nation, a First Nations Band. A majority of the members of Fox Lake Cree Nation live in the Town of Gillam or on Reserve Land in the nearby community of Bird, which is also located within the Gillam Local Government District. The ghost town of Sundance whose purpose was to facilitate the building of the Limestone Generating Station, is also within the District of Gillam. Once a busy, fully functioning town, it has since been abandoned and torn down after the completion of Limestone (named for the Limestone River that empties into the Nelson just downstream of the dam).

=== 2019 BC murders ===
In late July and early August 2019, Gillam became an inadvertent subject in worldwide media after a burning Toyota RAV4 was found near Fox Lake Cree Nation. The RCMP confirmed it belonged to Leonard Dyck, a BC man whose body was found near a burning pickup truck south of the Stikine River Bridge in British Columbia. The pickup truck's drivers, Bryer Schemegelsky and Kam Mcleod, then just considered missing persons, became suspects in the murder of Dyck and of a tourist couple whose bodies were found near Liard Hot Springs, BC. The RCMP launched a massive manhunt in the surrounding Gillam area, scouring through more than 11,000 square kilometres of dense brush and forest, and conducting searches of more than 500 houses in Gillam and nearby York Landing. After several days of fruitless searching, a breakthrough came through on August 3, when a damaged rowboat and several objects belonging to Schmegelsky and Mcleod were found scattered along the banks of the nearby Nelson River. On August 7, the RCMP confirmed that it had found the bodies of Schemegelsky and Mcleod about 1 kilometre from the rowboat, who died in dense brush of self-inflicted gunshot wounds. They were found approximately 65 kilometres north-east of Gillam.

== Geography ==
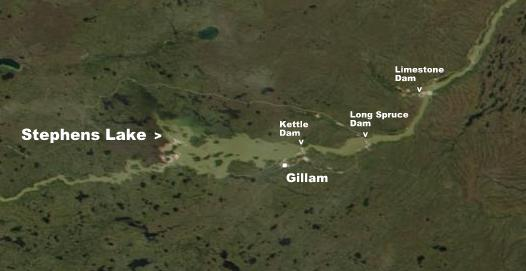
Location of Gillam on Stephens Lake

Gillam is located on the southeastern shore of Stephens Lake, a reservoir created by Manitoba Hydro in 1971 by the Kettle Dam on the Nelson River.

=== Climate ===
Gillam has a subarctic climate (Dfc) with long and extremely cold winters, briefly interrupted by short and mild summers. Its inland position at 56 degrees latitude causes severe freezes in winter, even though its all-time extreme cold temperatures are less extreme than its normals suggest. The lack of warming chinook influences ensures that Gillam is colder than Fairbanks, Alaska, despite the fact the latter is eight degrees latitude farther north and a greater distance from the sea.

Climate data for Gillam A, Manitoba (1981–2010): 145m
Month	Jan	Feb	Mar	Apr	May	Jun	Jul	Aug	Sep	Oct	Nov	Dec	Year
Record high °C (°F)	2.9 (37.2)	4.6 (40.3)	12.4 (54.3)	28.7 (83.7)	32.4 (90.3)	36.8 (98.2)	35.2 (95.4)	35.1 (95.2)	31.0 (87.8)	22.4 (72.3)	9.5 (49.1)	2.6 (36.7)	36.8 (98.2)
Mean daily maximum °C (°F)	−19.7 (−3.5)	−16.0 (3.2)	−7.9 (17.8)	1.9 (35.4)	9.9 (49.8)	18.0 (64.4)	21.8 (71.2)	20.0 (68.0)	12.4 (54.3)	3.6 (38.5)	−7.6 (18.3)	−16.9 (1.6)	1.6 (34.9)
Daily mean °C (°F)	−24.4 (−11.9)	−21.7 (−7.1)	−14.6 (5.7)	−4.4 (24.1)	3.9 (39.0)	11.6 (52.9)	15.8 (60.4)	14.4 (57.9)	7.9 (46.2)	0.0 (32.0)	−11.6 (11.1)	−21.4 (−6.5)	−3.7 (25.3)
Mean daily minimum °C (°F)	−29.0 (−20.2)	−27.3 (−17.1)	−21.2 (−6.2)	−10.6 (12.9)	−2.2 (28.0)	5.1 (41.2)	9.7 (49.5)	8.7 (47.7)	3.3 (37.9)	−3.5 (25.7)	−15.5 (4.1)	−25.9 (−14.6)	−9.0 (15.7)
Record low °C (°F)	−46.1 (−51.0)	−45.0 (−49.0)	−42.6 (−44.7)	−33.0 (−27.4)	−22.8 (−9.0)	−6.1 (21.0)	−1.7 (28.9)	−1.7 (28.9)	−9.1 (15.6)	−26.9 (−16.4)	−39.4 (−38.9)	−45.1 (−49.2)	−46.1 (−51.0)
Average precipitation mm (inches)	19.6 (0.77)	19.0 (0.75)	22.7 (0.89)	21.7 (0.85)	42.6 (1.68)	55.8 (2.20)	78.6 (3.09)	76.1 (3.00)	56.8 (2.24)	42.2 (1.66)	38.0 (1.50)	23.3 (0.92)	496.4 (19.55)
Average snowfall cm (inches)	25.2 (9.9)	24.6 (9.7)	27.6 (10.9)	22.1 (8.7)	15.7 (6.2)	2.1 (0.8)	0.0 (0.0)	0.0 (0.0)	4.6 (1.8)	26.2 (10.3)	44.2 (17.4)	28.9 (11.4)	221.2 (87.1)
Average precipitation days (≥ 0.2 mm)	13.2	11.5	10.9	8.4	10.6	11.4	14.1	14.1	14.6	13.6	15.1	13.3	150.7
Average snowy days (≥ 0.2 cm)	14.5	12.6	11.6	7.5	4.7	1.0	0.0	0.0	1.6	9.1	15.3	14.5	92.3
Source: Environment and Climate Change Canada

== Demographics ==
Historical population
Year	Pop.	±%
1981	1,427	—
1986	1,909	+33.8%
1996	1,534	−19.6%
2001	1,178	−23.2%
2006	1,209	+2.6%
2011	1,317	+8.9%
2016	1,265	−3.9%
2021	1,007	−20.4%

In the 2021 Census of Population conducted by Statistics Canada, Gillam had a population of 1,007 living in 352 of its 588 total private dwellings, a change of −16.2% from its 2016 population of 1,201. With a land area of 1,994.44 km^{2} (770.06 sq mi), it had a population density of 0.5/km^{2} (1.3/sq mi) in 2021.

As a designated place, Gillam had a population of 836 living in 295 of its 471 total private dwellings in 2021, a change of −19.3% from its 2016 population of 1,036. With a land area of 1.01 km^{2} (0.39 sq mi), it had a population density of 827.7/km^{2} (2,143.8/sq mi) in 2021.

== Amenities ==
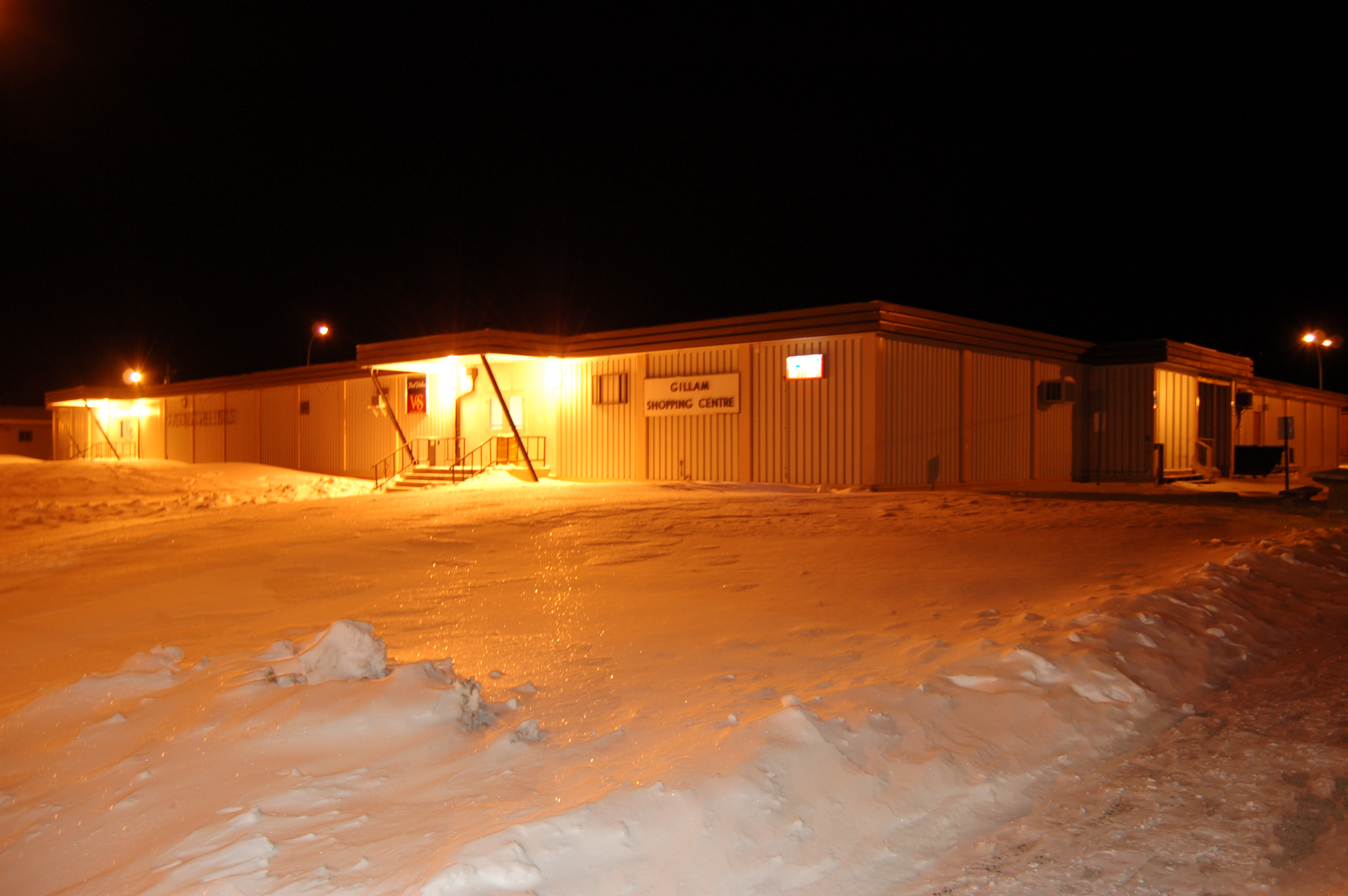
Gillam shopping centre

Gillam Recreation Centre offers a movie theatre, ice skating, hockey, curling, a gymnasium, a weight room, meeting rooms, a youth activity room and a library. There are also many small businesses, a small mall, a locally owned pharmacy, grocery store, school (K-12), Canada Post office, Co-op card lock/gas station, Co-op convenience store, Royal Canadian Legion, a train station and a local Royal Canadian Mounted Police detachment.

The Town of Gillam often has activities and events planned throughout the year. The Winter Carnival is an annual, week long series of events held in March. The Welcome Back Weekend is full of fun activities including the annual firework show which brings out a large portion of the town's population. This is held the weekend immediately after the Labour Day holiday.

Popular summer activities in the Gillam area are fishing and boating on the many lakes and rivers, while hunters search for game animals such as bear, caribou, moose, wolf, ptarmigan and grouse. The town has community parks and playgrounds, and Pumphouse Beach is just 2 km (1.2 mi) away from town. The three hydroelectric dams near town may be toured with a guide. In colder months, snowmobilers have access to hundreds of kilometres of groomed trails.

== Transportation ==
Gillam is situated on the Hudson Bay Railway line to Churchill and receives limited VIA rail passenger service at the Gillam railway station. Severe flooding in May 2017 caused several washouts, closing the line at Amery and suspending service beyond Gillam. Repairs were delayed due to a dispute with track owners OmniTRAX and full service did not resume until December 2018.

Manitoba Provincial Road 280 links Gillam to the rest of Manitoba, making it one of the northernmost communities in the province accessible by year-round road. Scheduled flights to Winnipeg and Thompson are available via Calm Air at Gillam Airport.

== Media ==
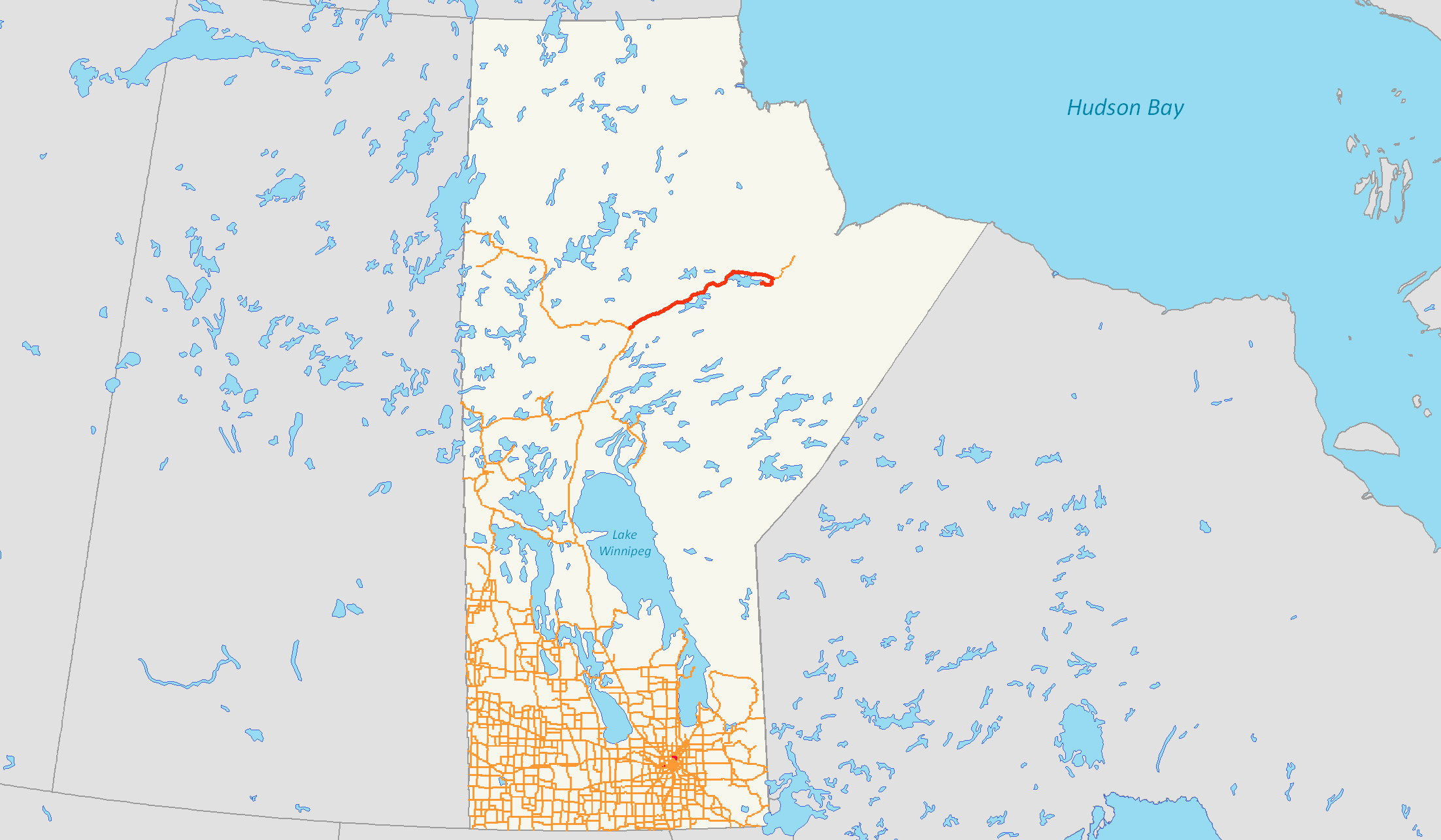
Manitoba Provincial Road 280 (red) links Gillam to the rest of Manitoba

- CBWLT joined the province-wide microwave network in the summer of 1969.
- CBWLT channel 8 (CBC)

== See also ==
- Nelson River Bipole
- Amery railway station
- Kettle Rapids railway station
- Luke railway station
