= Long Spruce Generating Station =

Coordinates: 56°24′1″N 94°22′10″W

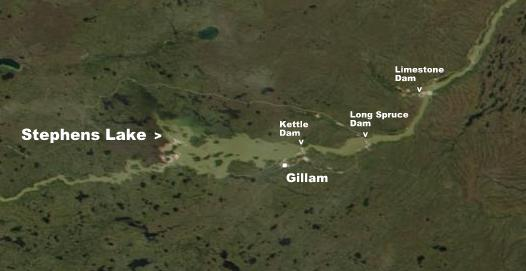
Long Spruce Dam is east of Stephens Lake

Long Spruce Generating Station is a run-of-the-river hydroelectric dam on the Nelson River approximately 745 kilometres (463 mi) northeast of Winnipeg in the Canadian province of Manitoba.

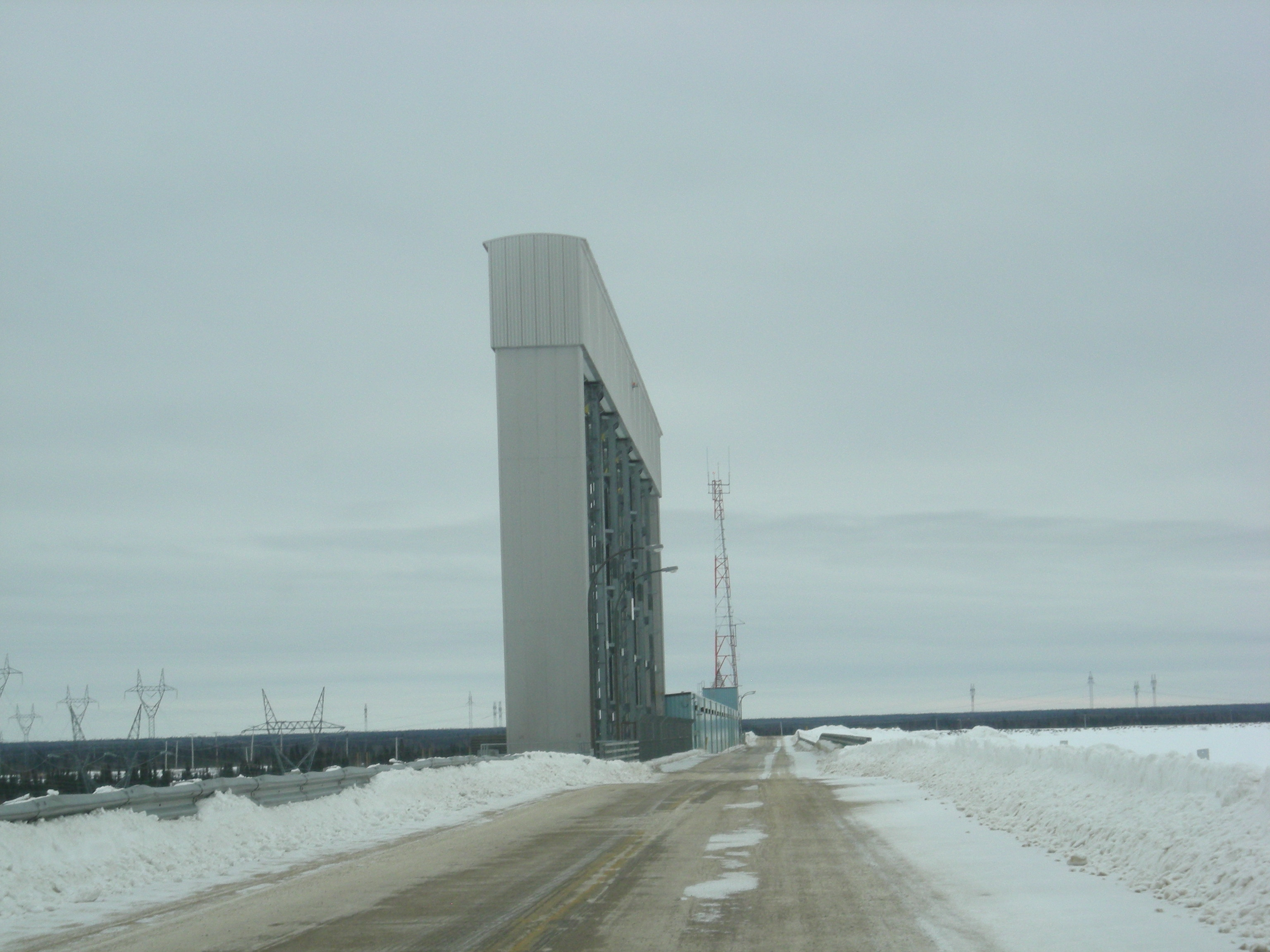
Looking along the roadway that crosses the dam at Long Spruce generating station in Gillam, Manitoba. On the left is the spillway gate hoist tower; the powerhouse and communication antenna can be seen in the distance.

It was Manitoba Hydro's fourth generating station to be built on the Nelson River, which flows from Lake Winnipeg to Hudson Bay. The station was built on Long Spruce Rapids. The site is approximately 27 kilometres (17 mi) east of Gillam, Manitoba and is 16 kilometres (9.9 mi) downstream of Manitoba Hydro's Kettle Generating Station.

The dam is owned and operated by Manitoba Hydro. Its ten turbine-generator units give it a generating capacity of 1,010 megawatts (1,350,000 hp) and annual generation around 5.8 terawatt-hours. Each unit produces around 100 megawatts (130,000 hp) with an operating head of 26 metres (85 ft) and flow of 458 cubic metres per second (16,200 cu ft/s) cubic metres per second. The first concrete for the structures was placed in 1974, with first power delivered in 1977. The station was completed in 1979 at a cost of $CDN 508 million.

== See also ==
- Kettle Generating Station – upstream, completed in 1973
- Limestone Generating Station – downstream, completed in 1990
- List of largest power stations in Canada
- Nelson River Hydroelectric Project
