= Nelson River Hydroelectric Project =

Hydroelectric project in Manitoba, Canada

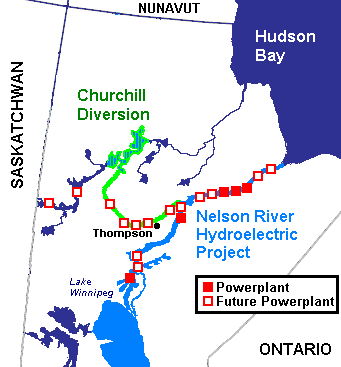
Powerplants (existing and planned) of the Nelson River Hydroelectric Project, Manitoba, Canada (2006). The Churchill Diversion diverts part of the Churchill at South Indian Lake south into the Rat River branch of the Burntwood River.

The Nelson River Hydroelectric Project refers to the construction of a series of dams and hydroelectric power plants on the Nelson River in Northern Manitoba, Canada. The project began to take shape in the late 1950s, with the planning and construction of the Kelsey dam and hydroelectric power station, and later was expanded to include the diversion of the upper Churchill River into the Nelson River and the transformation of Lake Winnipeg, the world's 11th largest freshwater lake, into a hydroelectric reservoir. The project is owned and operated by Manitoba Hydro, the electrical utility in the province.

== Overview ==
Several sites on the Nelson River, with potential of millions of horsepower, had been identified as early as 1911, but transmission of power to population centres in the south was beyond the state of the art of electric power transmission at that time. Between 1955 and 1960, studies were carried out to determine what resources would be available for future hydraulic generation in Manitoba. The stations at Kelsey, Kettle, Long Spruce and Limestone were built on the lower Nelson River to support both Manitoba load growth and export plans. Limestone, the largest generating station in Manitoba, is on the Lower Nelson only 90 km from Hudson Bay. Long-term firm power sales contracts were signed with Northern States Power Company of Minneapolis, Minnesota. Control dams and excavated channels have transformed Lake Winnipeg into a 25,000 km^{2} reservoir for the Nelson hydroelectric system.

The great distance between generating sites on the Nelson River and load centres in southern Manitoba required the use of high-voltage direct current (HVDC) electric power transmission lines to bring the energy to market. When these lines began operation as the Nelson River Bipole in 1972, they were the longest and highest-voltage direct current lines in the world. The Dorsey converter station is 26 km northwest of Winnipeg, Manitoba.

== Generating stations ==
	Started	Units	Total power (Note: Generating station total ratings are approximate.) (MW)	Average annual generation (TWh)	Head	River	Development stage	Location
Stations								
Kelsey	1957	7	211	1.8	17 m	Lower Nelson	Operational	56.0398°N 96.5353°W
Kettle	1970	12	1,228	7.1	30 m	Lower Nelson	Operational	56.3823°N 94.6278°W
Long Spruce	1977	10	1,010	5.8	26 m	Lower Nelson	Operational	56.4022°N 94.3599°W
Jenpeg	1979	6	97	0.9	10 m	Lake Winnipeg outlet	Operational	54.543°N 98.0229°W
Limestone	1990	10	1,340	7.7	28 m	Lower Nelson	Operational	56.5067°N 94.1051°W
Wuskwatim	2012	3	200	1.55	22 m	Burntwood	Operational	55.5369°N 98.4943°W
Keeyask (Gull)	2021	7	695	4.4	19.2	Lower Nelson	Operational	56.3465°N 95.2048°W
Planned stations								
Bonald	-	-	110	-	10.7	Upper Churchill	Feasibility assessment	55.765°N 101.5868°W
Granville Falls	-	4	120	-	11	Upper Churchill	Feasibility assessment	56.1503°N 100.3578°W
Notigi	-	-	120	0.75	12.9	Rat	Pre-investment (Note: Process suspended in 2002.)	55.8604°N 99.3308°W
Early morning	-	3	80	-	8.5	Burntwood	Feasibility assessment	55.613°N 98.680°W
Kepuche (Note: Three possible configurations are being studied for the Burntwood River: high head Manasan; low head Manasan and Kepuche; or Birchtree.)	-	4	210	-	17.2	Burntwood	Feasibility assessment	55.6144°N 98.1575°W
Birchtree	-	4	290	-	23.3	Burntwood	Feasibility assessment	55.6970°N 98.0444°W
Manasan	-	-	70 (low head); 270 (high head)	-	7.9 (low); 21.8 (high)	Burntwood	Feasibility assessment	55.7161°N 97.9456°W
First Rapids	-	4	210	-	19	Burntwood	Feasibility assessment	56.0494°N 96.9042°W
Whitemud (Note: Red Rock and Whitemud are alternatives to the Bladder Rapids Station.)	-	-	310	-	11.4	Upper Nelson	Feasibility assessment	54.7472°N 97.8811°W
Red Rock	-	-	250	-	9.3	Upper Nelson	Feasibility assessment	54.8717°N 98.0167°W
Bladder Rapids (Note: Bladder Rapids is an alternative to the Red Rock and Whitemud Stations.)	-	7	510	-	18.2	Upper Nelson	Feasibility assessment	54.3233°N 97.4942°W
Kelsey extension	-	-	200	-	-	Lower Nelson		
Birthday	-	9	420	-	9.2	Lower Nelson	Feasibility assessment	56.3071°N 95.583°W
Conawapa	n/a	10	1,380	7.0	32.0	Lower Nelson	Feasibility assessment	56.6861°N 93.7895°W
Gillam Island	-	11	1,000	-	23.2	Nelson (mouth)	Feasibility assessment	56.9236°N 92.8055°W

== Churchill River diversion ==
One of the key elements of the Nelson project was the diversion of much of the Churchill River into the Nelson watershed. The 1,600-kilometre-long (1,000 mi) Churchill River originates in northern Alberta and drains into Hudson Bay at Churchill, Manitoba. Currently the Missi Falls Control Structure (57.3427°N 98.1381°W) at the mouth of South Indian Lake reduces the flow of the Churchill River to 15% of its natural flow. This causes South Indian Lake to rise 3 metres (9.8 ft), as opposed to the 10.6 metres (35 ft) envisioned in the original plan. The diverted water flows through the 9.3 km (5.8 mi) South Bay Diversion Channel into the Rat River, which is in the Nelson River watershed. The outflow of Rat River into the Burntwood and subsequently Nelson River is controlled by the Notigi Control Structure.(55.8604°N 99.3308°W)

Before the construction of the diversion, the Manitoba portion of the Churchill River was estimated to have 3 gigawatts of hydroelectric potential. The river was however 160 km (99 mi) further north than the Nelson River, thus further from the major users of power in southern Manitoba. Jointly harnessing the water increased the flow of the Nelson River by 40%, while the flow of the Burntwood River is now 9 times pre-diversion levels. In 1973 Manitoba Hydro was granted an interim licence to divert 850 cubic metres per second (30,000 cubic feet per second) of water from the Churchill River. Construction began the same year and finished in 1976. Diversion began 9 September 1976 with full planned potential reached on 20 August 1977.

== New projects ==
Studies are continuing to permit eventual construction of new generating projects along the Nelson River. The 1380 megawatt Conawapa project was initiated but postponed indefinitely in 1992 when Ontario Hydro elected not to purchase firm energy from Manitoba. The Conawapa project was further delayed in 2014 and there are no current plans for the project to proceed. The station at Notigi would be rated approximately 100 megawatts, but no in-service date has been set for this project.

More than 5000 MW of hydroelectric potential could be developed in Manitoba, which includes 1380 MW at the Conawapa site and 1000 MW at the Gillam Island site, all on the lower Nelson river. Other sites have been assessed but are not currently under study for development. All of these developments would require a large increase in electric power exports, since Manitoba load growth will not require this capacity for a generation or more. All of these projects require additional HVDC transmission capacity from the North to the South.

== Controversies and issues ==
Like any other large-scale activity, the Nelson River Hydroelectric Project has not been without controversy.

In 1976, the Churchill River diversion project was set into operation. Flow was diverted by a series of channels and control structures into the Nelson River. Instead of developing hydroelectric sites along the Churchill River, water was diverted by control structures and an artificial channel into the Nelson, thereby increasing flow and saving cost of development. The effects of this diversion on pre-existing water levels and the indigenous Cree and Métis people continue to be felt to this day. Negotiations between the affected Northern communities and Manitoba Hydro continue, to discuss mitigation measures and compensation for loss of traditional resource areas and sites.

The water level of Lake Winnipeg is now regulated by Manitoba Hydro as part of the energy generation operations. Some property owners on the southern edge of the lake feel that the levels are now maintained at a higher average level than would be natural, and attribute erosion of their property to the lake level. Manitoba Hydro has pointed out that the regulation project also allows lake level to be lowered, such as during the 1997 floods, thereby preventing significant property damage.

Although development of the Nelson River system was intended to secure a reliable source of low-cost energy to promote industrial development in Manitoba, such development was not forthcoming. Concerns about the magnitude and cost of Hydro development led the provincial government to start an inquiry into the management of the company. The Commission of Inquiry into Manitoba Hydro reported in 1979 that Manitoba Hydro had not developed resources in the lowest-cost and most efficient way, and made many recommendations for the governance of Manitoba Hydro.

== See also ==
- Electric power
- Environmental concerns with electricity generation
- Hydroelectricity
- Manitoba Hydro
- James Bay Project
