= Limestone Lake (Manitoba) =

Lake in Manitoba, Canada

- Location of the lake in Manitoba Limestone Lake (Canada)
- Location: Census Division 23, Northern Region, Manitoba
- Coordinates: 56°34′57″N 95°55′00″W
- Part of: Hudson Bay drainage basin
- Primary outflows: Limestone River
- Basin countries: Canada
- Max. length: 18.2 km (11.3 mi)
- Max. width: 5.5 km (3.4 mi)
- Surface elevation: 189 m (620 ft)

Limestone Lake is a lake in Northern Manitoba, Canada. It is in the Hudson Bay drainage basin and is the source of the Limestone River.

There are two named bays on the lake: Kinoseeti Bay at the east; and Sakawisew Bay, from which the Limestone River flows, at the north.

The closest access point is Little Churchill River/Dunlop's Fly In Lodge Aerodrome, 12 kilometres (7 mi) to the west on Waskaiowaka Lake.

== See also ==
- List of lakes of Manitoba
