= Kettle Generating Station =

Dam in Gillam, MB

- Location within Manitoba
- Country: Canada
- Location: Gillam
- Coordinates: 56°23′03″N 94°38′06″W
- Status: Operational
- Construction began: 1966
- Opening date: 1973
- Construction cost: C$240 million

Dam and spillways
- Impounds: Lower Nelson River
- Spillway type: Eight gates
- Spillway capacity: 8,349 m^{3}/s (294,842 cu ft/s)

Reservoir
- Creates: Stephens Lake
- Surface area: 337 km^{2} (130 mi^{2})
- Maximum length: 36 km (22 mi)
- Normal elevation: Winter: 141.1 m (463 ft); Summer: 140.2 m (460 ft)

Power Station
- Commission date: 1973-1974
- Hydraulic head: 30 m (98 ft)
- Turbines: 12 x 102 MW Propeller turbine
- Installed capacity: 1,220 MW (1,640,000 hp)

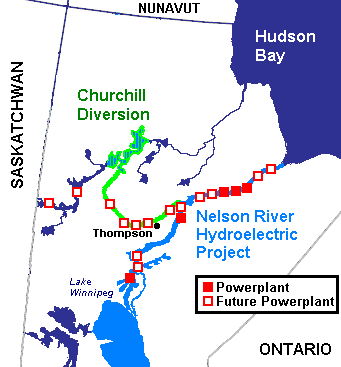
Hydroelectrical Complex on Churchill and Nelson rivers, Northern Manitoba, Canada.

The Kettle Generating Station, also known as Kettle Rapids Generating Station, is a run-of-the-river hydroelectric power station on the Lower Nelson River in Manitoba, Canada. It is located 6 km (4 mi) northeast of Gillam. As part of the Nelson River Hydroelectric Project, the power station was completed in 1973 and the last generator commissioned in 1974. It has an installed capacity of 1,220 megawatts (1,640,000 hp) and is the second largest power station in Manitoba.

Construction on the station began in the spring of 1966 and it was carried out in several phases. First, the power house was constructed after a circular coffer dam was set on the right side of the river. Second, the spillway was built adjacent and to the left of the power house while the river flowed through the power house in the meantime. Once the spillway was complete the entire the river was diverted through it. At this point, the turbines and generators were loaded into the power house and the earth-fill section on the dam's left bank was completed. The first generator was commissioned in December 1970 and seven generators were operational in June 1973 when the station was officially opened. The last generator was commissioned in November 1974.

Of the river's 885 m (2,904 ft) width, the power house covers 380 m (1,247 ft) or 43 percent. The spillway covers 22 percent in the center of the dam and the earth-fill dam completes the remaining 35 percent in length. The dam's spillway is controlled by eight floodgates and can discharge up to 8,349 m^{3}/s (294,842 cu ft/s) of water. The power house contains twelve 102 MW propeller-type turbine-generators for an installed capacity of 1,220 MW. Each turbine can discharge up to 270 m^{3}/s (9,535 cu ft/s) and are afforded 30 m (98 ft) of hydraulic head.

== See also ==
- List of largest power stations in Canada
- Long Spruce Generating Station – second dam downstream, completed in 1979
- Limestone Generating Station – third dam downstream, completed in 1990
