= Limestone Lake (British Columbia) =

Lake in British Columbia, Canada

- Location within Vancouver Island
- Location: Vancouver Island, British Columbia
- Coordinates: 49°41′00″N 125°37′00″W
- Lake type: Natural lake
- Basin countries: Canada

Limestone Lake is a lake located on Vancouver Island west of Buttle Lake in Strathcona Provincial Park.

== See also ==
- List of lakes of British Columbia
