= Limestone Generating Station =

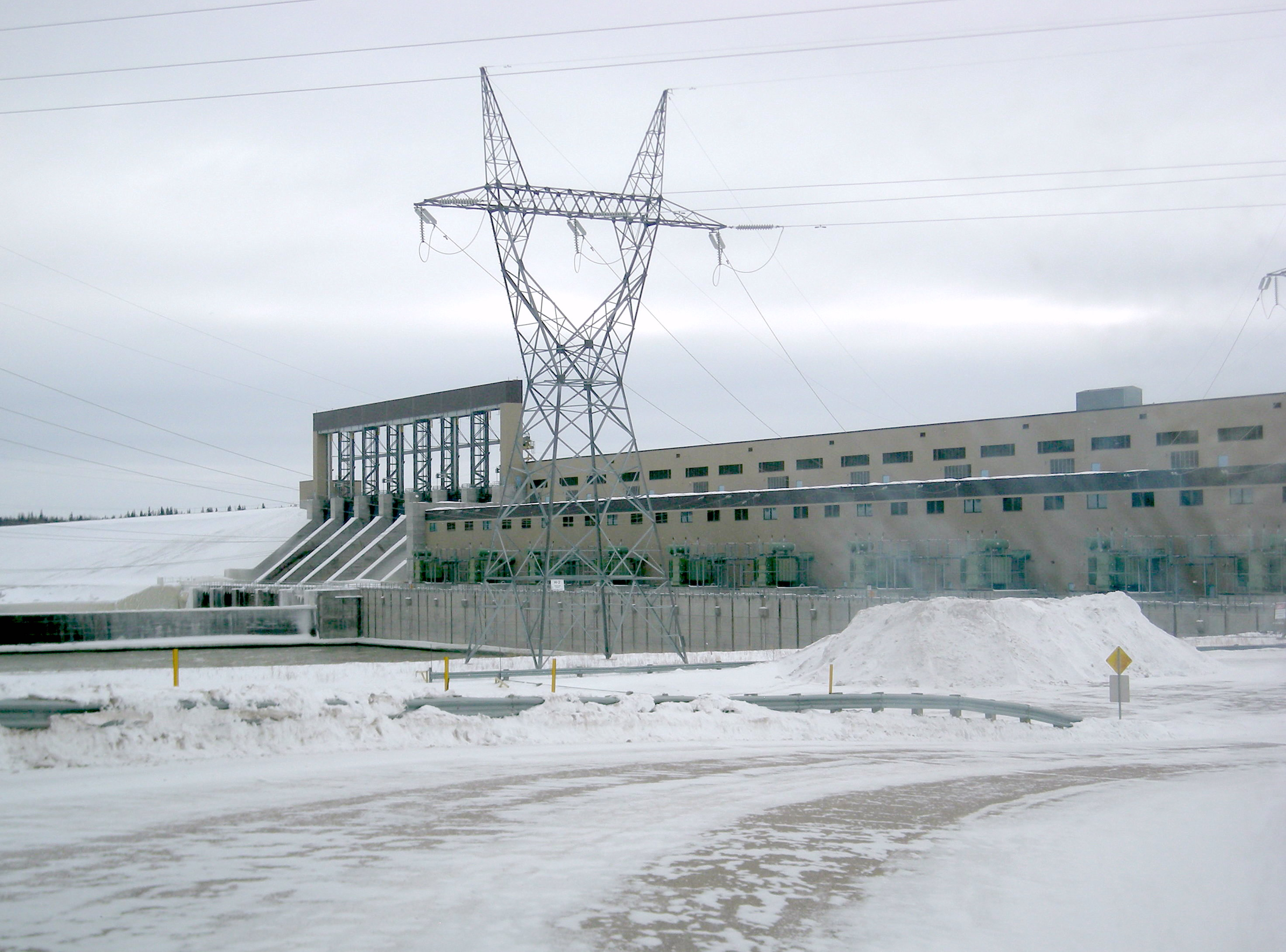

- Location within Manitoba
- Country: Canada
- Location: Gillam, Manitoba
- Coordinates: 56°30′25″N 94°6′25″W
- Status: Operational
- Construction began: 1985
- Opening date: 1990-1992
- Construction cost: C$1.430 Billion
- Owner: Manitoba Hydro

Dam and spillways
- Type of dam: Barrage
- Impounds: Nelson River
- Length: 299 m (981 ft)
- Dam volume: 2,900,000 m^{3} (102,413,000 cu ft)
- Spillway capacity: 9,570 m^{3}/s (337,960 cu ft/s)

Reservoir
- Surface area: 27.2 km^{2} (10.5 sq mi)
- Normal elevation: 85.3 m (279.9 ft)

Power Station
- Type: Run-of-the-river
- Hydraulic head: 27.6 m (90.6 ft)
- Turbines: 10 × 134 MW; Kaplan turbine
- Installed capacity: 1,340 MW
- Annual generation: 7,700 GWh
- Website; Limestone GS

Limestone Generating Station is a run-of-the-river hydroelectric dam on the Nelson River approximately 750 kilometres (470 mi) north of Winnipeg near Gillam, Manitoba. Part of the Nelson River Hydroelectric Project, Limestone was Manitoba Hydro's fifth and largest generating station to be built on the Nelson River. The station was built on the Nelson River at Long Spruce Rapids. The site is approximately 23 kilometres (14 mi) downstream of Manitoba Hydro's Long Spruce Generating Station.

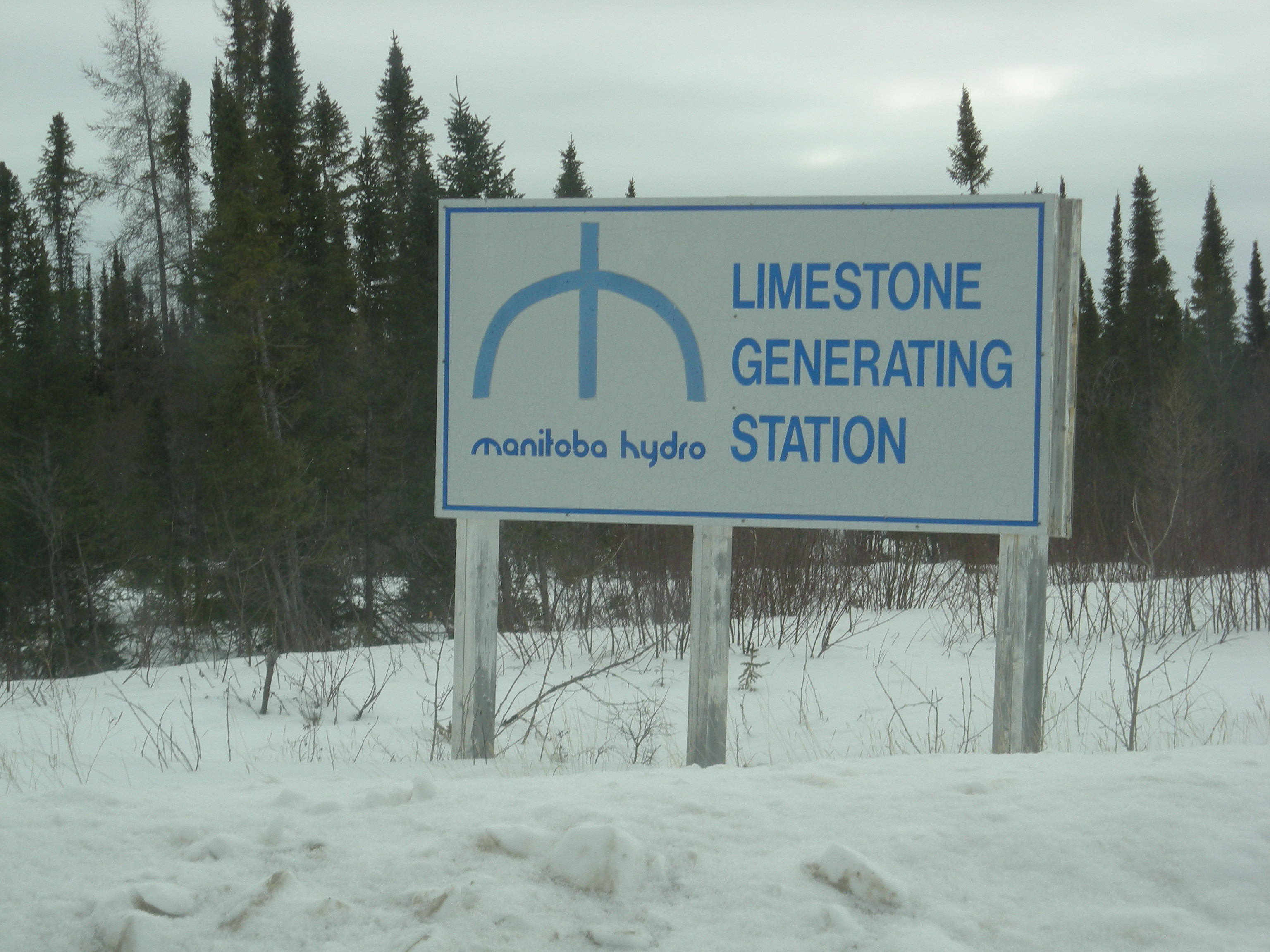
Manitoba Hydro Limestone generating station entrance sign near Gillam, Manitoba.

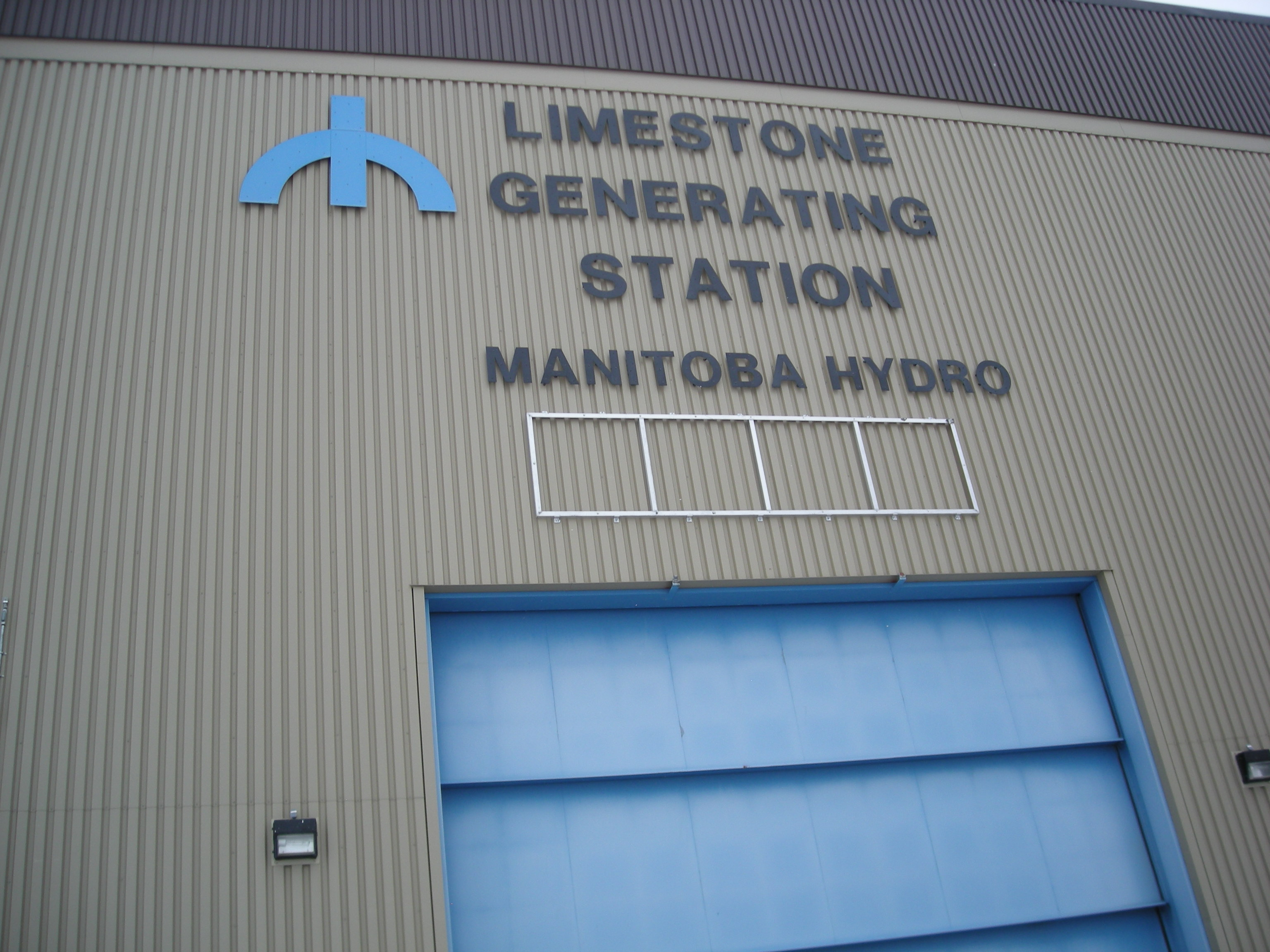
Manitoba Hydro Limestone generating station building sign near Gillam, Manitoba.

The dam is owned and operated by Manitoba Hydro. It has ten generating units with a capacity of 1,330 megawatts and annual generation around 8.5 terawatt-hours. Although work at the site began in 1976 with a cofferdam completed in 1978, construction was suspended owing to a slowing of demand for electric power. The project resumed in 1985, with the first generating unit delivering power in 1990 and completion in 1992. Construction cost was $CDN 1.43 billion; favorable economic conditions at the time resulted in lower cost than budget.

== See also ==
- List of largest power stations in Canada
- Kettle Generating Station – first dam upstream, completed in 1973
- Long Spruce Generating Station – second dam upstream, completed in 1979
- Nelson River DC Transmission System – transmission system to loads in the South of the province
