= Fox Lake Cree Nation =

Fox Lake Cree Nation ᒪᐦᑫᓯᐤ ᓵᑲᐦᐃᑲᐣ Makaso Sakahigan
- Treaty: Treaty 5
- Headquarters: Gillam, Manitoba

Government
- Chief: Morris Beardy

Tribal Council
- Keewatin Tribal Council

Website
- foxlakecreenation.com

Fox Lake Cree Nation (Cree: ᒪᐦᑫᓯᐤ ᓵᑲᐦᐃᑲᐣ, Makaso Sakahigan (mahkêsiw sâkahikan)) (formerly Gillam Band) is a First Nations band government whose reserve is located in Fox Lake, Bird, Manitoba, Canada.

The Fox Lake Training Centre, offers courses and programs delivered by the University College of the North.

== History ==
In 1947, Canada recognized the Gillam Band as an independent band and renamed it as the Fox Lake Band in 1949.

On November 8, 2007, Fox Lake Cree Nation dedicated a monumental statue in Gillam, Manitoba. This was to honor the Fox Lake Cree Nation members who died during the development of Manitoba Hydro in Fox Lake Cree Nation's territory and did not live to see the signing of an Impact Settlement Agreement between Fox Lake Cree Nation, Manitoba Hydro, and the Government of Manitoba in 2004.

== Indian Reserves ==
Fox Lake Cree Nation's primary reserve is called Bird located in Northern Manitoba, around Gillam, Manitoba. The band is in charge of the following reserves:

- A Kwis Ki Mahka Indian Reserve — 1.30 ha.
- Fox Lake Indian Reserve No. 1 — 192 km northeast of Thompson 561.70 ha.
- Fox Lake Indian Reserve No. 2, — all portions of unsurveyed TWP 86, Range 21 E OF WPM 39.50 ha.
- Fox Lake Indian Reserve No. 3 — TWP 77 & 78, Ranges 4&5, EPM 1138.80 ha.
- Gillam Indian Settlement — 0 ha.

== See also ==
- Cree
