= Nelson River =

River in Manitoba, Canada

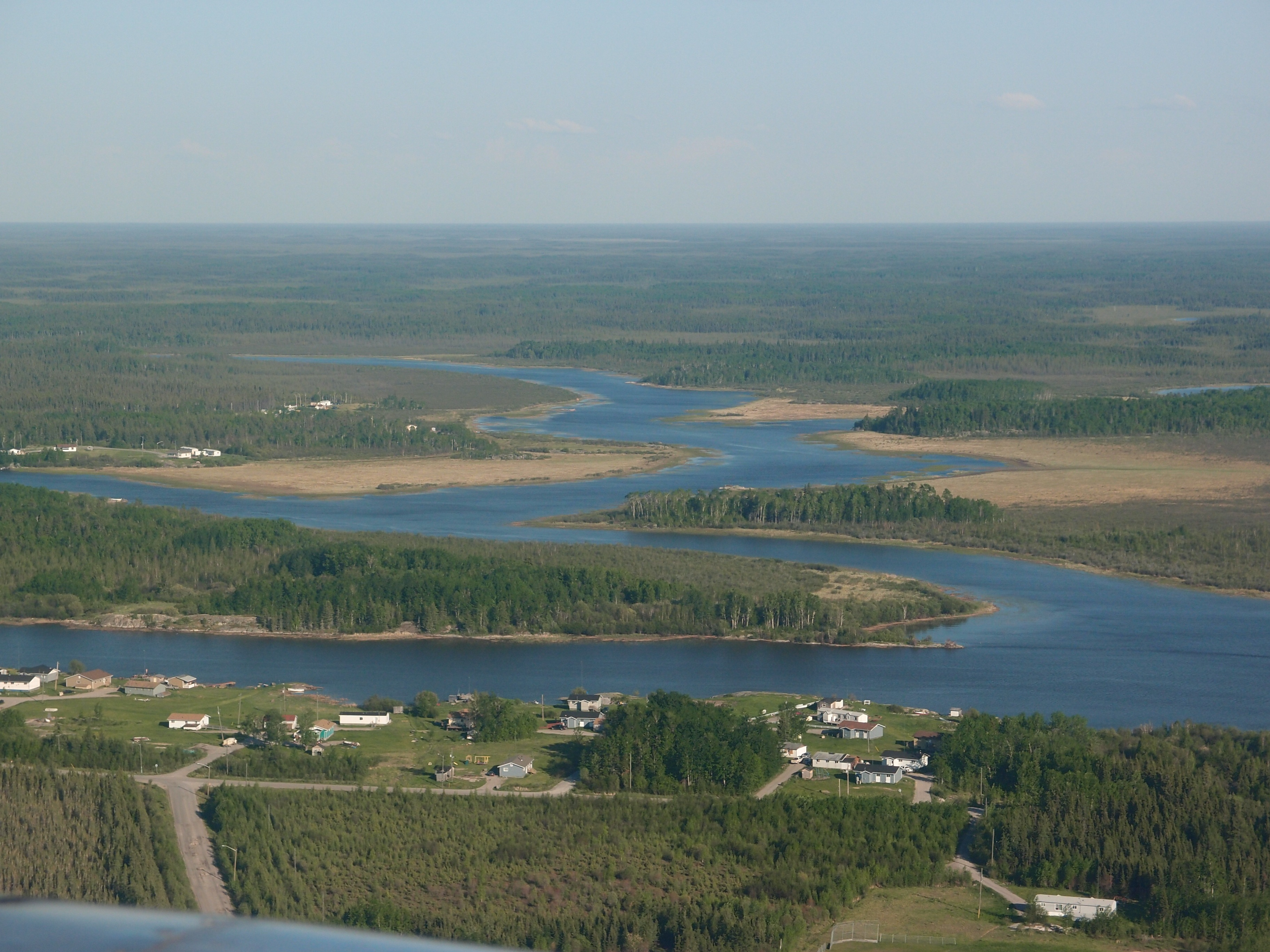
- Nelson River near Norway House

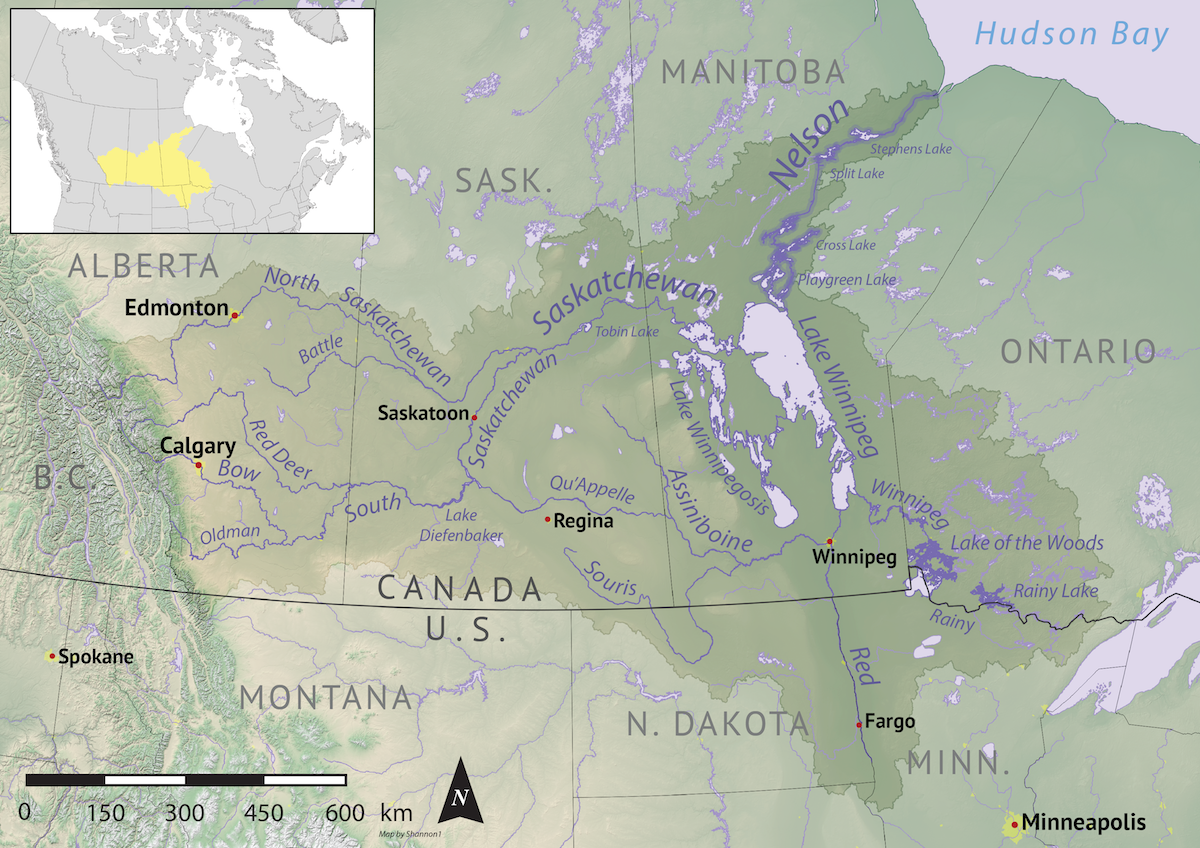
- Map of the Nelson River drainage basin
- Native name: Pawaninakaw Sipi (Swampy Cree)

Location
- Country: Canada
- Province: Manitoba

Physical characteristics
- Source: Lake Winnipeg
  - location: Warren Landing, Manitoba
  - coordinates: 53°41′20″N 97°50′52″W
  - elevation: 217 m (712 ft)
- Mouth: Hudson Bay
  - location: Port Nelson, Manitoba
  - coordinates: 57°5′5″N 92°30′8″W
  - elevation: 0 m (0 ft)
- Length: 644 km (400 mi)
- Basin size: 1,072,300 km^{2} (414,000 sq mi)
- Discharge
  - location: Hudson Bay (near mouth)
  - average: (Period: 1984–2018); 111 km^{3}/a (3,500 m^{3}/s); 2,370 m^{3}/s (84,000 cu ft/s)
  - minimum: 1,000 m^{3}/s (35,000 cu ft/s)
  - maximum: 7,000 m^{3}/s (250,000 cu ft/s)

Basin features
- River system: Nelson River
- Tributaries
  - left: Burntwood River; Grass River

The Nelson River is a river of north-central North America, in the Canadian province of Manitoba. The river drains Lake Winnipeg and runs 644 kilometres (400 mi) before it ends in Hudson Bay near Port Nelson. Its full length (including the Saskatchewan River and Bow River) is 2,575 kilometres (1,600 mi), it has mean discharge of 2,370 cubic metres per second (84,000 cu ft/s), and has a drainage basin of 1,072,300 square kilometres (414,000 sq mi), of which 180,000 square kilometres (69,000 sq mi) is in the United States.

== Geography ==
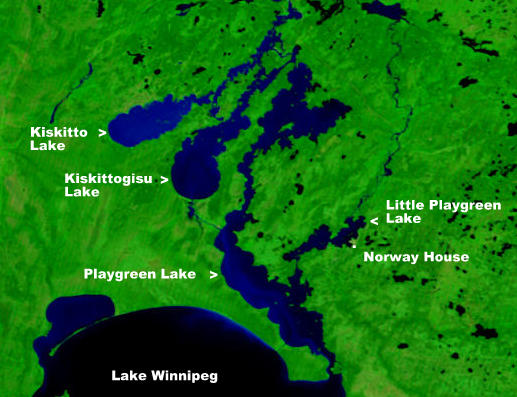
Playgreen Lake in Manitoba

The Nelson River flows into Playgreen Lake from Lake Winnipeg then flows from two channels into Cross Lake. The east channel and the Jack River flow from the southeast portion of the lake into Little Playgreen Lake then the Nelson east channel continues in a northerly direction passing through Pipestone Lake on its way to Cross Lake. The west channel flows out of the north ends of Playgreen Lake, Kiskittogisu Lake and Kiskitto Lake into Cross Lake at the Manitoba Hydro's Jenpeg Generating Station and Dam. From Cross Lake it flows through Sipiwesk Lake, Split Lake and Stephens Lake on its way to the Hudson Bay.

Since it drains Lake Winnipeg, it is the last part of the large Saskatchewan River system, as well as that of the Red River and Winnipeg River. Devils Lake is unusual for a glacial lake in being presently closed, also has been known to overflow into the Red River for at least five separate periods since deglaciation.

Besides Lake Winnipeg, its primary tributaries include the Grass River, which drains a long area north of Lake Winnipeg, and the Burntwood River, which passes through Thompson, Manitoba.

The river flows into Hudson Bay at Port Nelson (now a ghost town), just north of the Hayes River and York Factory. Other communities upriver from there include Bird, Sundance, Long Spruce, Gillam, Split Lake, Arnot, Cross Lake, and Norway House.

=== Transportation ===
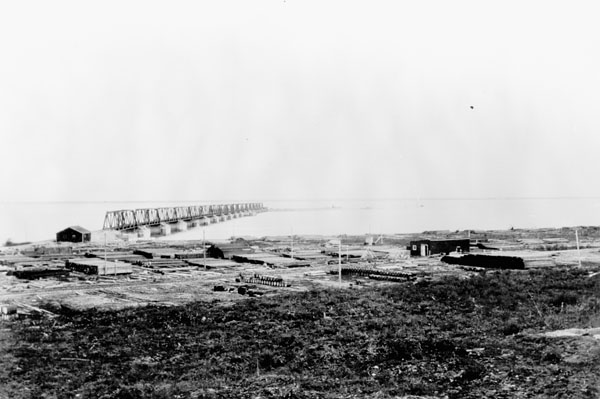
Port facilities at Port Nelson would have required a long causeway to reach deep water.

North America has just one port on the Arctic Ocean, linked to the North American railway grid—at Churchill, Manitoba, at the mouth of the Churchill River. Originally port facilities were to have been built at Port Nelson; original proposals for the Hudson's Bay rail link would have used that point as a terminus. Practical problems led to the port's relocation to Churchill. Those difficulties included a much greater need for dredging, because the Nelson River's water was more full of silt, in absolute terms, and carried more silt because of its greater volume of flow. The Nelson estuary is broad and shallow, so port facilities would have to be constructed on artificial islands created in the middle of the river, that would require a causeway approximately a kilometre long to reach.

== History ==
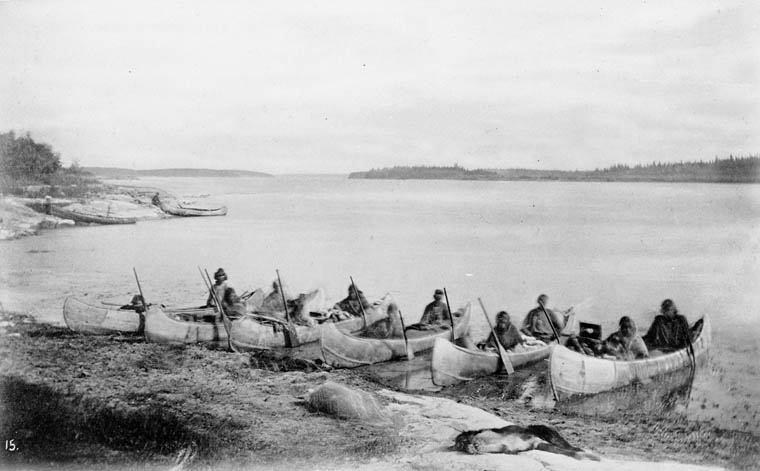
First Nations people on the Nelson River, 1878

The Mushkegowuk people who have lived along the rivers banks since time immemorial call it Pawaninakaw Sipi which means "river of white water."^{:52} The English name for the river was given by Sir Thomas Button, a Welsh explorer from St. Lythans, Glamorganshire, who wintered at its mouth in 1612, after Robert Nelson, a ship's master who died there. The area was fought over for the fur trade, though the Hayes River, whose mouth is near the Nelson's, became the main route inland.

Competition over the fur trade drove multiple attempts to establish trading posts at the mouth of the Nelson over a number of years. One 1670 expedition organized by the newly-chartered Hudson's Bay Company and guided by the French fur trader and adventurer Pierre-Esprit Radisson successfully reached the Nelson estuary. Landing in September, the first overseas governor of the Hudson's Bay Company, Charles Bayly, nailed a brass plate of the English royal arms to a tree, formally claiming the territory for England. They arrived too late in the season to trade with local indigenous people, however, who had migrated inland by that time.

Fort Nelson (1670–1713), a historic Hudson's Bay Company trading post, was built at the mouth of the Nelson River at Hudson Bay and was a key trading post in the early 18th century. After his pivotal role in establishing the Hudson's Bay Company, Pierre Esprit Radisson, noted French explorer, was chief director of trade at Fort Nelson during one of his sustained periods of service to England. Today, Fort Nelson no longer exists. Port Nelson, the abandoned shipping port, remains on the opposite side of the river mouth on Hudson Bay.

The Nelson River's huge volume and long drop make it useful for generating hydroelectricity. Flooding caused by damming of the river has provoked bitter disputes with First Nations in the past although the Northern Flood Agreement was created in the 1970s to help offset the damages caused by flooding.

"Travelling up the Nelson River, it's easy to see the impacts of hydro development. The once-pristine water is now silty and not to be trusted for drinking. Trees fall into the river everywhere along the shore, thanks to erosion caused by constantly fluctuating water levels. Ancient graves are being exposed, and sacred sites are now under water. What was once a highway for hunters is now dangerous to travel in winter, as the location of ice pockets created by flooding and retreating water cannot be predicted. A river that was once the basis for life has become deadly." Peter Kulchyski 2012

== See also ==
- List of longest rivers of Canada
- Nelson River Hydroelectric Project
- List of rivers of Manitoba
- Manitoba Hydro
- Nelson River Bipole
