= Manitoba Provincial Road 391 =

Provincial road in Manitoba, Canada

Provincial Road 391
- Tom Cochrane's Life is a Highway
- PR 391 highlighted in red

Route information
- Maintained by Department of Infrastructure
- Length: 323.0 km (200.7 mi)
- Existed: 1966–present

Major junctions
- South end: PTH 6 in Thompson
- PR 280 near Thompson; PR 493 in Leaf Rapids; PR 394 in Lynn Lake
- North end: PR 396 / PR 397 in Lynn Lake

Location
- Country: Canada
- Province: Manitoba
- Major cities: Thompson
- Towns: Leaf Rapids, Lynn Lake

Highway system
- Provincial highways in Manitoba; Winnipeg City Routes
← PR 384	→ PR 392

Provincial Road 391 (PR 391) is an all-weather highway connecting Thompson and Lynn Lake, in the NorMan Region of the Canadian province of Manitoba. PR 391 is located in the Wapisu Range. PR 391 passes through Leaf Rapids, a community situated northwest of Thompson. Lynn Lake is the last town PR 391 traverses, where it ends at an intersection with PR 397 and PR 396.

The designation of PR 391 was applied in 1966, running from Highway 10 in Simonhouse, using modern-day Highway 39 to Wekusko Lake. It also used modern-day Highway 6 between Highway 39 and Thompson, where a spur to Thompson Airport was designated as Provincial Road 382, a short spur outside of the city. By 1970, PR 382 was absorbed into PR 391. The construction of the section of PR 391 between Lynn Lake and Thompson was done between 1970 and 1974.

In 2016 province announced that a 322-kilometre section of PR 391 connecting Lynn Lake and Thompson would be designated Tom Cochrane's Life Is a Highway, commemorating the Lynn Lake-born singer-songwriter's 1991 hit song of that name.

== Route description ==
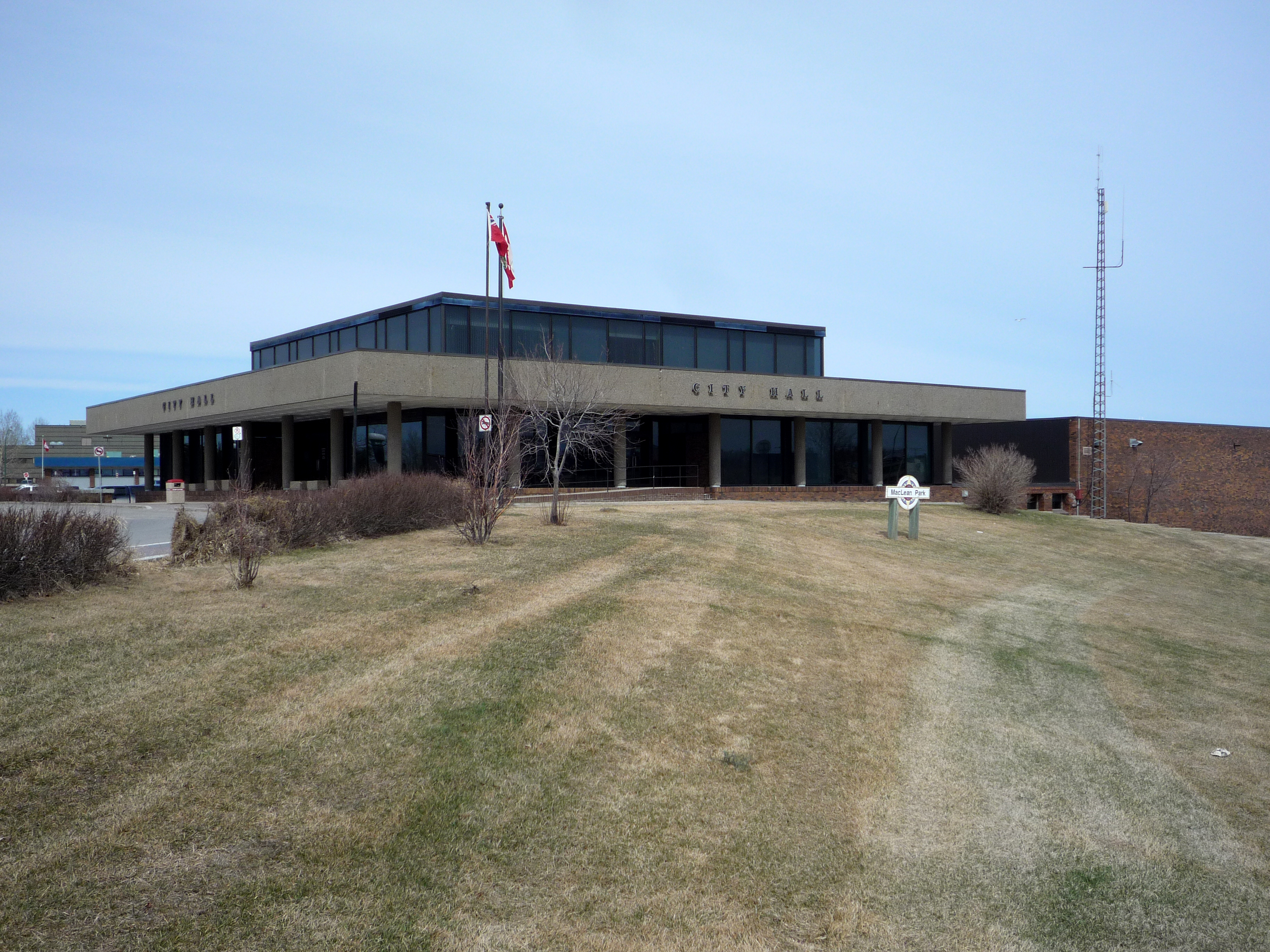
Thompson City Hall, located on PR 391 northbound

PR 391 begins at the at-grade interchange with Burntwood Road as a divided continuation of Highway 6 in the city of Thompson. Known as Mystery Lake Road, PR 391 becomes the major arterial through Thompson, passing the Burntwood Regional Health Authority Hospital. The route bends north through Thompson, passing through the main commercial district at the intersection with Thompson Drive. After Thompson Drive, PR 391 turns northeast and leaves the city centre of Thompson, crossing over Mystery Lake. The route winds northward as it passes the Thompson Golf Club and reaches the access road to Thompson Municipal Airport. After passing southwest of the runways, PR 391 reaches a junction with the western terminus of PR 280, which brings people to Gillam.

After PR 280, PR 391 becomes a two-lane gravel road through the uninhabited portions of northern Manitoba. The route runs northwest and west for various points until reaching the area of Mooswuchi Lake. There the route bends southwest and starts winding west until reaching a junction with a local road that connects to Nelson House. PR 391 passes south along the tip of Kawaweyak Lake and continues winding westward for several kilometres until reaching Wapisu Lake, where it starts jumping over various bodies of water over six bridges from east to west, popping out south of Mooswu Lake. At this point, PR 391 starts running northwest until Suwannee Lake. The route turns northward at the Suwannee River, passing Turnbull Lake before reaching the town of Leaf Rapids.

Through Leaf Rapids, PR 391 runs along the western side of town, intersecting with several local roads that connect to the centre of the community, such as Mistik Road and Muhekun Road. The latter connects PR 391 to the town hall for Leaf Rapids. The route crosses past Mistik Road again before reaching a junction with PR 493 (Mine Road), which connects to South Indian Lake. Leaving Leaf Rapids, PR 391 crosses over the Churchill River and passes east of the Leaf Rapids Airport, which consists of one runway. After Leaf Rapids, the route runs northward for several kilometres, making the next bend to the northwest at Scotland Lake. Passing Adam Lake and Conrad Lake, the route winds west through northern Manitoba before turning northwest at Gap Lake.

PR 391 continues northwest it approaches Lynn Lake. Passing north of the local railway junction, the route turns southwest and enters downtown Lynn Lake. Within downtown Lynn Lake, PR 391 reaches a junction with the northern terminus of PR 399 (Canoe Street). Gaining the moniker of Sherritt Avenue, the route runs southwest through downtown, reaching a junction with PR 394 (Silver Street). PR 391 continues southeast, crossing the Lynn River before reaching a junction with PR 397 and PR 396, marking the western terminus.

== History ==
Provincial Road 382
- Location: Thompson
- Existed: 1966–1970

In 1961, the province of Manitoba declared the section of modern-day Highway 39 from Simonhouse to Wekusko Lake as a gravel road and a section of modern-day Highway 6 from the lake to Opswagon Lake paralleling the Grand Trunk Railway as a flat-earth road, while there a finished stretch in the area of Thompson as a gravel road, with a spur to Mystery Lake. By 1966, the sections had been designated as Provincial Road 391 (PR 391) from Simonhouse to Thompson, while the spur to Mystery Lake and the Thompson Airport was designated as PR 382. By 1969, the section of modern-day PR 391 from Lynn Lake to the shores of the Churchill River near Leaf Rapids was constructed as an all-weather road. The next year, the route had been extended to the Suwanee River and designated as part of PR 391. The section between the Suwanee River and Thompson was also proposed as a new all-weather road while PR 382 between Thompson and the airport was decommissioned and absorbed into PR 391.

PR 391 was completed the next year from the airport westward to an area several kilometres northwest. By 1973, PR 391 was extended westward to a creek from Footprint Lake with a span to Nelson House. Finally, the road was completed between the Suwanee River and the creek, marking the completion between Lynn Lake and Thompson. In 1987, PR 391 was truncated back all the way to Thompson and replaced with Highway 39 from Simonhouse to Wekusko Lake and Highway 6 between Wekusko Lake and the southern border of Thompson.

== Major intersections ==
Division	Location	km	mi	Destinations	Notes
City of Thompson		0.0	0.0	PTH 6 south (Mystery Lake Road) / Burntwood Road – Wabowden, Winnipeg	Northern terminus of PTH 6; southern terminus of PR 391 and Tom Cochrane's Life is a Highway
City of Thompson		2.5– 2.7	1.6– 1.7	Bridge over the Burntwood River	
Mystery Lake		7.2	4.5	PR 633 (Airport Road) – Thompson Airport	Access road into airport
Mystery Lake		12.391	7.699	PR 280 east – Split Lake, Gillam	Western terminus of PR 280
No. 22		76.499	47.534	PR 631 (Main Road) – Nelson House	Southern end of unpaved section
No. 22		84.9	52.8	Bridge over the Footprint River	
No. 23	Notigi	111.4– 111.8	69.2– 69.5	Notigi Control Structure across the Rat River	
No. 23		178.7– 179.0	111.0– 111.2	Causeway across the Suwannee River; northern end of unpaved section	
Town of Leaf Rapids		220.338	136.912	PR 493 north – South Indian Lake	Southern terminus of PR 493
Town of Leaf Rapids		223.2– 223.4	138.7– 138.8	Bridge over the Churchill River	
Town of Leaf Rapids		223.6	138.9	Leaf Rapids Airport	Access road into airport
No. 23		264.5	164.4	Bridge over the Hughes River	
No. 23		273.7	170.1	Bridge over the Hughes River	
Marcel Colomb First Nation		291.4	181.1	Black Sturgeon Road – Black Sturgeon	
Town of Lynn Lake		314.8	195.6	Bridge over the Keewatin River	
Town of Lynn Lake		322.0	200.1	PR 399 north (Canoe Street)	Northern terminus of PR 399
Town of Lynn Lake		323.0	200.7	PR 394 west (Silver Street) – Kinoosao, SK	Eastern terminus of PR 394; northern terminus of Tom Cochrane's Life is a Highway
Town of Lynn Lake		323.5	201.0	Bridge over the Lynn River	
Town of Lynn Lake		324.158	201.422	PR 396 west – Fox Mine; PR 397 east – Lynn Lake (Eldon Lake) Water Aerodrome	Northern terminus of PR 391; eastern terminus of PR 396; western terminus of PR 397
1.000 mi = 1.609 km; 1.000 km = 0.621 mi

== Related routes ==
=== Provincial Road 396 ===
Provincial Road 396
- Location: Fox Mine–Lynn Lake
- Length: 45.62 km (28.35 mi)
- Existed: 1972–present

Provincial Road 396 (PR 396) is a 48.0-kilometre-long (29.8 mi) east-west spur of PR 391, connecting the town of Lynn Lake with the now defunct Fox Mine, as well as several small lakes and campgrounds throughout the area. It is entirely a paved two-lane highway.

Division	Location	km	mi	Destinations	Notes
No. 23	Fox Mine	0.00	0.00	Dead end	Western terminus
Town of Lynn Lake		27.4	17.0	McVeigh Road – McVeigh Train Yard	Access road into Keewatin Railway rail yard
Town of Lynn Lake		45.62	28.35	PR 391 south (Sherritt Avenue) / PR 397 east – Eldon Lake, Lynn Lake (Eldon Lake) Water Aerodrome	Eastern terminus; northern terminus of PR 391; western terminus of PR 397
1.000 mi = 1.609 km; 1.000 km = 0.621 mi

=== Provincial Road 397 ===
Provincial Road 397
- Location: Lynn Lake
- Length: 5.13 km (3.19 mi)
- Existed: 1966–present

Provincial Road 397 (PR 397) is a short 5.13-kilometre-long (3.19 mi) east-west spur of PR 391 in the town of Lynn Lake, connecting downtown (via the southern end of PR 391 along Sherritt Avenue) with Eldon Lake, the Lynn Lake (Eldon Lake) Water Aerodrome, and an industrial park next to the lakeshore. It is entirely a paved two-lane highway running a very rural and wooded part of town.

Division	Location	km	mi	Destinations	Notes
Town of Lynn Lake		0.00	0.00	PR 391 south (Sherritt Avenue) / PR 396 west – Downtown, Fox Mine	Western terminus; Northern terminus of PR 391; eastern terminus of PR 396
Town of Lynn Lake		5.13	3.19	Dead end at Lynn Lake (Eldon Lake) Water Aerodrome	Eastern terminus
1.000 mi = 1.609 km; 1.000 km = 0.621 mi

=== Provincial Road 399 ===
Provincial Road 399
- Canoe Street, Halstead Avenue
- Location: Lynn Lake
- Length: 0.45 km (0.28 mi; 1,500 ft)
- Existed: 1966–present

Provincial Road 399 (PR 399) is an extremely short 0.45-kilometre-long (0.28 mi) east-west spur of PR 391 in the town of Lynn Lake, running along Canoe Street and Halstead Avenue. It is entirely a paved two-lane highway, now coming to dead end where it formerly serviced a now decommissioned mine.

Division	Location	km	mi	Destinations	Notes
Town of Lynn Lake		0.00	0.00	PR 391 (Sherritt Avenue / Tom Cochrane's Life is a Highway) – Leaf Rapids, Downtown	Western terminus
Town of Lynn Lake		0.45	0.28	Dead end	Eastern terminus
1.000 mi = 1.609 km; 1.000 km = 0.621 mi
