= Southern Indian Lake =

Lake in Manitoba, Canada

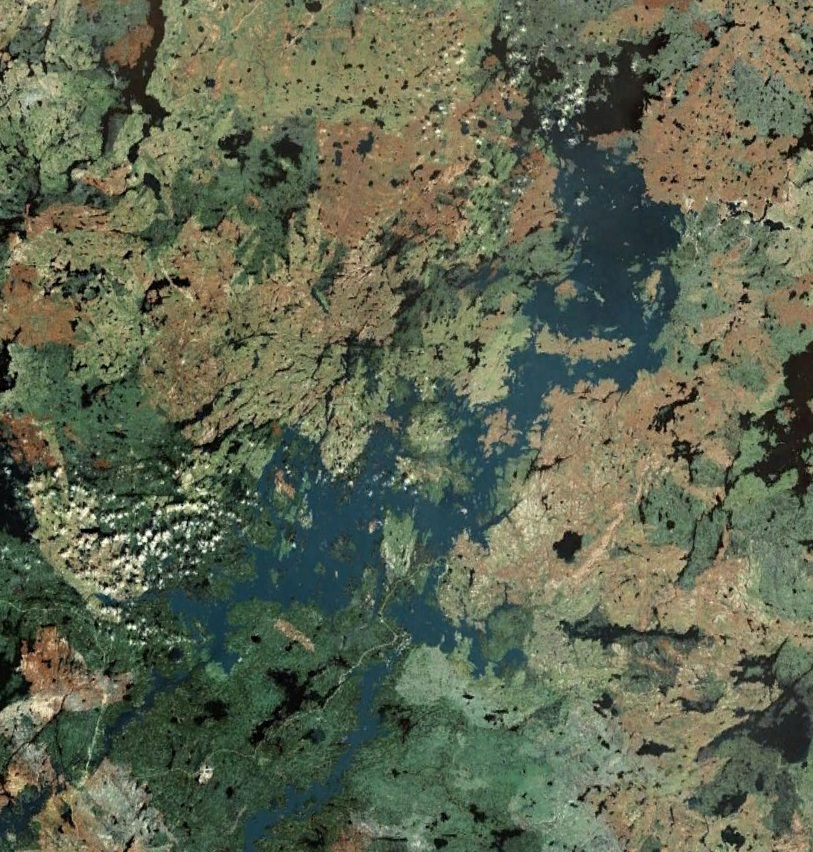

- Location in Manitoba Southern Indian Lake (Canada)
- Location: Division No. 23, Manitoba, Canada
- Coordinates: 57°10′N 98°30′W
- Primary inflows: Churchill River
- Primary outflows: Churchill River and Rat River
- Catchment area: 242,000 km^{2} (93,000 sq mi)
- Basin countries: Canada
- Surface area: 2,247 km^{2} (868 sq mi)
- Average depth: 9.8 m (32 ft)
- Max. depth: 30 m (98 ft)
- Water volume: 23.4 km^{3} (19,000,000 acre⋅ft)
- Shore length^{1}: 3,798 km (2,360 mi)
- Surface elevation: 258 m (846 ft)
- Frozen: between October–June
- Islands: many
- Settlements: South Indian Lake
- ^{1} Shore length is not a well-defined measure.

Southern Indian Lake is a large lake in northern Manitoba, Canada. It has an area of 2,247 square kilometres (868 sq mi) (including islands) with a surface elevation of 258 metres (846 ft).

Southern Indian Lake is the fourth largest lake in Manitoba. It has a complex shoreline with many islands, long peninsulas and deep bays. The Churchill River flows through the lake.

The community of South Indian Lake is located on the southeast shore, about 130 kilometres (81 mi) (by air) north of the city of Thompson. It had a population of 767 in 2011 and is the main settlement of the O-Pipon-Na-Piwin Cree Nation, a First Nations band government.

Southern Indian Lake is on the Fidler map of 1814.

The lake and the settlement are accessed by the South Indian Lake Airport and Manitoba Provincial Road 493 (PR 493). PR 493, a gravel road, begins at Leaf Rapids on PR 391 (also a gravel road), running 219.1 kilometres (136.1 mi) northeast to its terminus at South Indian Lake. The nearest city, Thompson, is 436 kilometres (271 mi) by road.

== Churchill River Diversion ==
The Churchill River Diversion of the Nelson River Hydroelectric Project diverts part of the Churchill River at Missi Falls, the natural outflow of Southern Indian Lake, south into the Rat River branch of the Burntwood River. The control dam at Missi Falls (Missi Falls Control Structure) raised the lake level 3 metres. An artificial outflow channel (South Bay Diversion Channel) was also created from South Bay of Southern Indian Lake to Issett Lake. The dam at Notigi (Notigi Control Structure) on the Rat River controls the flow to the Nelson River system.

== See also ==
- List of lakes of Manitoba
