= List of band-operated schools in Manitoba =

First Nation administered schools in Manitoba, Canada

There are many band-operated schools in Manitoba. These are schools funded at the federal level by the Government of Canada but managed by one or more of the First Nations band governments. In accordance with the treaty arrangements between the federal government and most individual First Nations, band-operated schools must be administered by locally elected School boards, and operate outside the direct control of the local chief and band council.

While there is no legislative requirement that band-operated schools follow provincial curricula, or adhere to the Manitoba Public Schools Act or the Manitoba Education Administration Act, most of them do operate very similarly to provincial schools. The more closely a federal school follows provincial curricula, the more readily its students can transfer into the provincial system. Graduation from First Nation high schools that retain accreditation is recognized by post-secondary institutions.

In First Nation schools, provincial professional organizations such as the Manitoba Teachers' Society (MTS) are noticeably absent. Of the fifty-one First Nations communities that operate federal schools, only two have teachers who are members of the provincial union, while all other public school teachers are automatically members under the Public Schools Act and Education Administration Act. The exceptions are members of the Nelson House Teachers' Association in Nisichawayasihk Cree Nation and the Sandy Bay Teachers' Association in Sandy Bay Ojibwa First Nation. The members of these two bargaining units are not entitled to the MTS pension and disability benefits plans, as no legislation exists that would allow them to participate.

== List ==
- Birdtail Sioux Nursery School - Birdtail Sioux First Nation, Manitoba
- Sargeant Tommy Prince School - Brokenhead Ojibway Nation, Manitoba
- Wambdi Iyotake School - Canupawakpa Dakota Nation, Oak Lake, Manitoba
- Chemawawin School - Chemawawin Cree Nation, Manitoba
- Mahpiya Hdega School - Dakota Plains First Nation, Manitoba
- Dakota Tipi School - Dakota Tipi First Nation, Manitoba
- Dauphin River School - Dauphin River First Nation, Manitoba
- Ebb & Flow School - Ebb & Flow First Nation, Manitoba
- Pinaymootang School - Pinaymootang First Nation, Manitoba
- Charles Sinclair School - Fisher River Cree Nation, Manitoba
- Fox Lake School - Fox Lake Cree Nation, Manitoba
- Kistigan Wacheeng - Garden Hill First Nation, Manitoba
- Garden Hill First Nation High School - Garden Hill First Nation
- God's Lake Narrows First Nation School - God's Lake First Nation, Manitoba
- Keeseekoowenin School - Keeseekoowenin Ojibway Nation, Manitoba
- Lawrence Sinclair Memorial School - Kinonjeoshtegon First Nation, Manitoba
- Lake Manitoba School - Lake Manitoba First Nation, Manitoba
- Lake St. Martin School - Lake St. Martin First Nation, Manitoba
- Little Black River School - Little Black River First Nation, Manitoba
- Little Grand Rapids School - Little Grand Rapids First Nation, Manitoba
- Little Saskatchewan H.A.G.M.E. School - Little Saskatchewan First Nation, Manitoba
- Long Plain School - Long Plain First Nation, Manitoba
- Amos Okemow Memorial School - Manto Sipi First Nation, Gods River, Manitoba
- Sakastew School - Mathias Colomb First Nation, Pukatawagan, Manitoba
- Miskooseepi School - Bloodvein First Nation, Bloodvein, Manitoba
- Nisichawayasihk Neyo Ohtinwak Collegiate - Nisichawayasihk Cree Nation, Nelson House, Manitoba
- Otetiskiwin Kiskinwamahtowekamik - Nisichawayasihk Cree Nation, Nelson House, Manitoba
- Petit Casimir Memorial School - Northlands First Nation, Manitoba
- Donald Ahmo School - O-Chi-Chak-Ko-Sipi First Nation, Manitoba
- Joe A. Ross School - Opaskwayak Cree Nation, Manitoba
- Oxford House Elementary School - Oxford House First Nation, Manitoba
- 1972 Memorial High School - Oxford House First Nation, Manitoba
- Pauingassi School - Pauingassi First Nation, Manitoba
- Peguis Central School - Peguis First Nation, Manitoba
- Mikisew Middle School - Pimicikamak Cree Nation, Manitoba
- Otter Nelson River School - Pimicikamak Cree Nation, Manitoba
- Pine Creek School - Pine Creek First Nation, Manitoba
- Poplar River School - Poplar River First Nation, Manitoba
- Red Sucker Lake First Nation School - Red Sucker Lake First Nation, Manitoba
- Wapi-Penace School - Rolling River First Nation, Manitoba
- Ginew School - Roseau River Anishnaabe First Nation, Roseau River (Manitoba–Minnesota)
- St. Theresa Point Elementary School - St. Theresa Point First Nation, Manitoba
- St. Theresa Point High School - St. Theresa Point First Nation, Manitoba
- St. Theresa Point Middle School - St. Theresa Point First Nation, Manitoba
- Sagkeeng Anicinabe Community School - Sagkeeng First Nation, Manitoba
- Sagkeeng Anicinabe High School - Sagkeeng First Nation, Manitoba
- Sagkeeng Consolidated School - Sagkeeng First Nation, Manitoba
- Isaac Beaulieu Memorial School - Sandy Bay Ojibway First Nation, Manitoba
- Neil Dennis Kematch Memorial School - Sapotaweyak First Nation, Manitoba
- Peter Yassie Memorial School - Sayisi Dene Nation, Manitoba
- Abraham Beardy School - Shamattawa First Nation, Manitoba
- Sioux Valley School - Sioux Valley Dakota Nation, Manitoba
- Indian Springs School (Manitoba) - Swan Lake First Nation, Manitoba
- Chief Sam Cook Mahmuwee Education Centre - Tataskweyak Cree Nation, Manitoba
- Chief Clifford Lynxleg Anishinabe School - Tootinawaziibeeng Treaty Reserve, Manitoba
- George Knott School - Wasagamack First Nation, Manitoba
- Waywayseecappo Community School - Waywayseecappo First Nation, Manitoba
- Wuskwi Sipihk School - Wuskwi Sipihk First Nation, Manitoba
- George Saunders Memorial School - York Factory First Nation, Manitoba
