= Manitoba Provincial Road 493 =

Provincial road in Manitoba, Canada

Provincial Road 493
- Mine Road

Route information
- Maintained by Department of Infrastructure
- Length: 97.3 km (60.5 mi)

Major junctions
- South end: PR 391 in Leaf Rapids
- North end: South Indian Lake

Location
- Country: Canada
- Province: Manitoba
- Towns: Leaf Rapids

Highway system
- Provincial highways in Manitoba; Winnipeg City Routes
← PR 491	→ PR 500

Provincial Road 493 (PR 493), also known as Mine Road, is an unpaved gravel road located in the Canadian province of Manitoba. The road, located in northwestern Manitoba, is 97.3 kilometres (60.5 mi) long. PR 493 provides the only road access to Ruttan Mine and the O-Pipon-Na-Piwin Cree Nation reserve community of South Indian Lake.

== Route description ==
PR 493's southern terminus is a junction with PR 391 in Leaf Rapids. Nearly 23 kilometres (14 mi) into the route, it crosses Brehaut Lake at Ruttan Mine. PR 493 then continues northeast, and crossing causeways over Issett Lake twice, as well as traversing Issett Island. After crossing a Cable Ferry over Southern Indian Lake, the route reaches its northern terminus in downtown South Indian Lake.

== Major intersections ==
Division	Location	km	mi	Destinations	Notes
Town of Leaf Rapids		0.0	0.0	PR 391 (Tom Cochrane's Life is a Highway) – Lynn Lake, Thompson	Western terminus
Town of Leaf Rapids		20.5	12.7	Causeway over Brehaut Lake	
Town of Leaf Rapids		22.9	14.2	Ruttan Mine	Access road into mine
23		38.1– 38.5	23.7– 23.9	Causeway over Issett Lake	
23		56.0– 56.5	34.8– 35.1	Causeway over Issett Lake	
23		60.1– 60.4	37.3– 37.5	Causeway over Issett Lake	
O-Pipon-Na-Piwin Cree Nation		92.7– 92.9	57.6– 57.7	C.F. Johnny Paul Cable Ferry over Southern Indian Lake	
O-Pipon-Na-Piwin Cree Nation	South Indian Lake	96.3	59.8	Airport Road – South Indian Lake Airport	Access road into airport
O-Pipon-Na-Piwin Cree Nation	South Indian Lake	97.3	60.5	Airport Road / Spence Street / Way Pa Nee Kees Kan Now Road	Eastern terminus
1.000 mi = 1.609 km; 1.000 km = 0.621 mi
