= Manitoba Provincial Road 399 =

Provincial road in Manitoba, Canada

Provincial Road 399
- Canoe Street, Halstead Avenue
- PR 399 highlighted in red

Route information
- Maintained by Manitoba Infrastructure
- Length: 0.45 mi (720 m)
- Existed: 1966–present

Major junctions
- South end: PR 391 in Lynn Lake
- North end: Dead end at former mine

Location
- Country: Canada
- Province: Manitoba
- Towns: Lynn Lake

Highway system
- Provincial highways in Manitoba; Winnipeg City Routes
← PR 398	→ PR 403

Provincial Road 399 (PR 399) is an extremely short 0.45-kilometre-long (0.28 mi) east-west spur of PR 391 in the town of Lynn Lake, running along Canoe Street and Halstead Avenue. It is entirely a paved two-lane highway, now coming to dead end where it formerly serviced a now decommissioned mine.

== Major intersections ==
Division	Location	km	mi	Destinations	Notes
Town of Lynn Lake		0.00	0.00	PR 391 (Sherritt Avenue / Tom Cochrane's Life is a Highway) – Leaf Rapids, Downtown	Western terminus
Town of Lynn Lake		0.45	0.28	Dead end	Eastern terminus
1.000 mi = 1.609 km; 1.000 km = 0.621 mi
