= Manitoba Provincial Road 280 =

Provincial road in Manitoba, Canada

Provincial Road 280

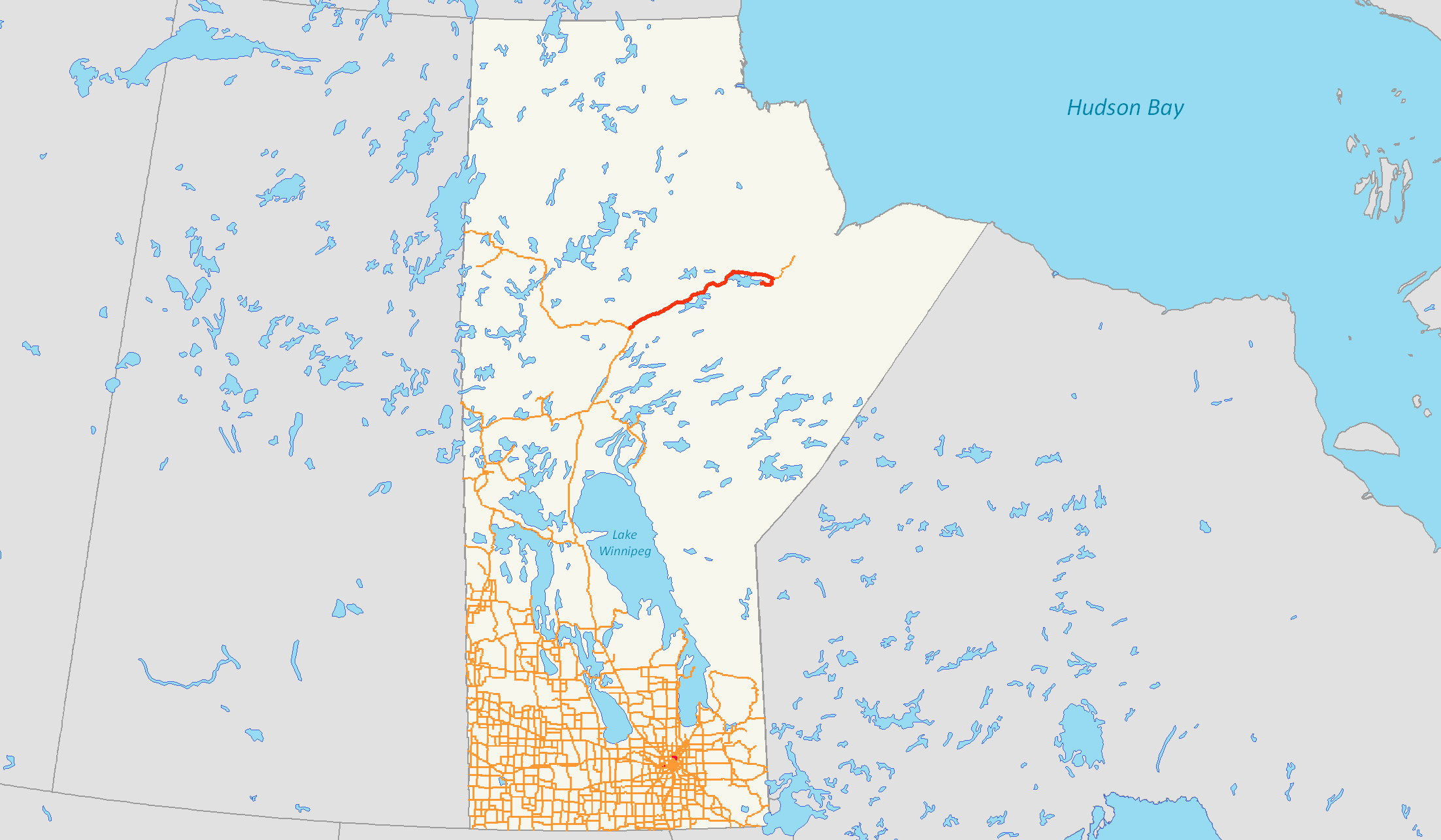

Route information
- Maintained by Manitoba Infrastructure and Transportation
- Length: 291 km (181 mi)
- Existed: 1987–present

Major junctions
- West end: PR 391 near Thompson
- PR 632 near Split Lake
- East end: PR 290 in Jacam

Location
- Country: Canada
- Province: Manitoba
- Towns: Gillam

Highway system
- Provincial highways in Manitoba; Winnipeg City Routes
← PR 279	→ PR 282

Provincial Road 280 (PR 280) is a road in the Canadian province of Manitoba. It runs from PR 391 northwest of Thompson to local streets in Gillam. The route is 291 kilometres (181 mi) long, which during its length, passes several large lakes and intersects with one provincial road, PR 290, just north of Gillam. The route is very scenic, passing through dense forests and rural lands. The route supplies three municipalities, Thompson, Split Lake, and Gillam. From its terminus north of Thompson, Manitoba to the town Gillam, PR 280 is classified as a Class A1 Provincial Route.

PR 280 was designated in 1987 as a connector from Thompson to Gillam with a spur to Sundance.

== Route description ==
PR 280 begins at an intersection north of Thompson on the shores of Birch Tree Lake with PR 391. PR 280 runs northeast from PR 391 as a two-lane gravel road through the dense woods north of Thompson Airport. As the road bends to the northeast, it runs west of Mystery Lake, which is connected by a gravel road that runs to the shoreline. Continuing northeast, PR 280 leaves the Mystery Lake area and soon reaches a dirt road that connects to nearby Moak Lake.

After Moak Lake, PR 280 continues northeast past Wasakamew Lake and Orr Lake while paralleling the Burntwood River. After Putkawakan Lake, PR 280 turns eastward along the Burntwood River, which soon drains into Split Lake. The road turns northeast away from the river and runs into a junction with a winter road that connects to the settlement of Split Lake. Paralleling the north shore of eponymous lake, PR 280 runs to the northeast from Split Lake and starts wandering through the dense woods of northern Manitoba.

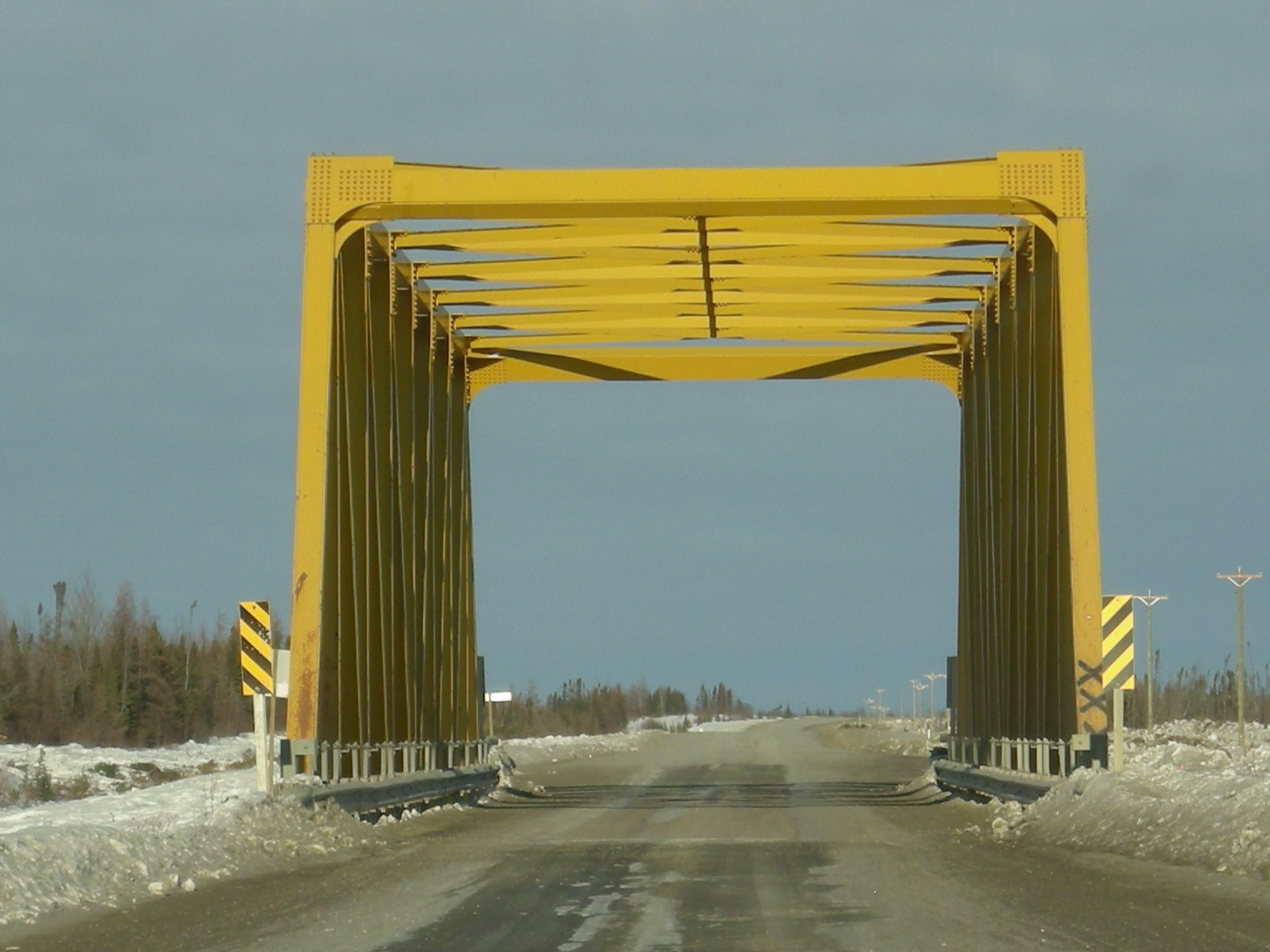
Yellow single vehicle bridge on PR 280

Approaching the western end of Stephens Lake, PR 280 turns east and soon to the southeast as it reaches the northern shore of the lake. Passing a local connector to the shore, the route reaches a junction with the southern terminus of PR 290, which connects to the abandoned settlement of Sundance. At this junction, PR 280 turns west, reaching the shores of the Nelson River. The route crosses over the Nelson River and reaches the settlement of Long Spruce.

After Long Spruce, PR 280 runs west along the southern shore of the Nelson River then turns south and southwest away from the river. The route winds west, then turns to the northwest, approaching the river and Stephens Lake. Paralleling railroad tracks, PR 280 passes an electrical substation as it enters the city of Gillam. Through the northeastern section of Gillam, the route crosses over the railroad tracks and turn north and west in short order. Running southwest, PR 280 reaches the access point to Gillam Airport and soon enters downtown Gillam.

Through downtown Gillam, PR 280 reaches a junction with Batnau Road, which marks the eastern terminus of the highway. Batnau Road connects to downtown Gillam.

== "Worst road in Manitoba" ==
In a Canadian Automobile Association survey conducted in April 2015, PR 280 was voted the worst road in Manitoba.

On May 16, 2016, CBC News reported that vehicles were becoming stranded or damaged by "big bogs of mud" on PR 280.

Later that same month, local protestors blockaded the road to demand remediation of its unsafe "potholes and ruts". A representative of Tataskweyak Cree Nation reported trucks, buses and private vehicles becoming stuck in mud.

== History ==
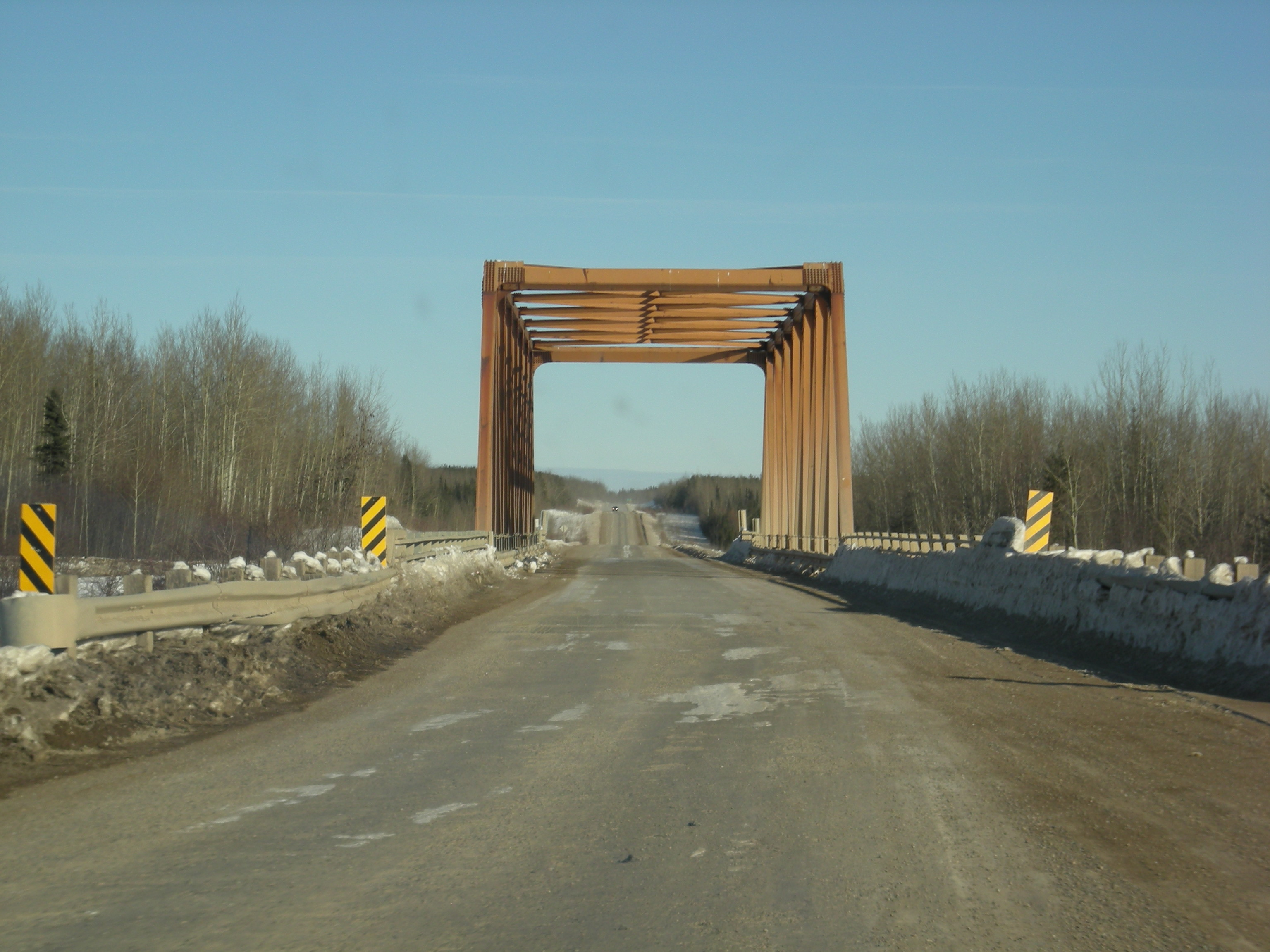
Brown single vehicle bridge on PR 280

Before PR 280 existed, the only ways to the northern terminus town of Gillam was via a nearby airport to the southeast of town and the railway line that stretched from Thompson to northern parts of Manitoba. The railway opened in 1929. PR 280 was designated by the Manitoba Ministry of Infrastructure and Transportation in 1987 as a designated gravel road from PR 391 northwest of Thompson to Gillam with an unnumbered spur to Sundance. PR 290 was designated on the spur in 1989.

On March 28, 2002, the government of Manitoba order out an CAD$84.8 million plan to work on its province's roads. $940,000 was spent for gravel stabilization beginning at PR 391 and ending in Gillam. This work was also under the Community Main Access Gravel Road Stabilization Program. $700,000 of this $84 million went for additional gravel between 391 and PR 290. $600,000 went to road development near Wasakamew Lake, 52 kilometres (32 mi) north of PR 391.

== Junction list ==
Division	Location	km	mi	Destinations	Notes
Mystery Lake		0.0	0.0	PR 391 (Tom Cochrane's Life is a Highway) – Thompson, Lynn Lake	Western terminus of PR 280
Mystery Lake				Mystery Mountain Winter Park	Access road into park
No. 22	Tataskweyak Cree Nation			PR 632 – Split Lake	Northern terminus of PR 632
Town of Gillam	Jacam			PR 290 north – Sundance	Eastern terminus of PR 280; southern terminus of PR 290
1.000 mi = 1.609 km; 1.000 km = 0.621 mi

== See also ==
- Manitoba Provincial Road 391
