= Split Lake =

Split Lake may refer to:

- Split Lake, Manitoba, a community in Manitoba, Canada
- Split Lake (Manitoba), a lake in Manitoba, Canada
- Split Lake (New Zealand), a lake in Northland, New Zealand
