= Nisichawayasihk Cree Nation =

Cree First Nations community in Manitoba, Canada

Coordinates: 55°47′00″N 98°53′18″W

- Band No. 313
- ᓂᓯᒐᐚᔭᓯᕽ nisicawâyasihk
- People: Cree
- Treaty: Treaty 5
- Headquarters: Nelson House
- Province: Manitoba

Land
- Main reserve: Nelson House 170
- Reserves: Nelson House 170A; Nelson House 170B; Nelson House 170C; Kapawasihk; Mile 20 Second Revision; Monahawuhkan; NCN Mystery Lake Parcel Reserve; Numaykoos Sakaheykun; Odei River; Opekanowi Sakaheykun; Opekunosakakanihk; Suwanne Lake; Wapasihk; Wapikunoo Bay; Wapisu Lake; Wuskwi Sakaheykun; Wuskwi Sipi
- Land area: 237.088 km^{2} (91.540 sq mi)

Population (2019)
- On reserve: 2997
- On other land: 156
- Off reserve: 2129
- Total population: 5282

Government
- Chief: Cheryl Moore
- Council: Cheyenne Spence; Craig Linklater; Barb Moore; Kim Linklater; Ron D. Spence; Jeremiah Spence

Website
- ncncree.com

The Nisichawayasihk Cree Nation (NCN; Cree: ᓂᓯᒐᐚᔭᓯᕽ, nisicawâyasihk; formerly the Nelson House First Nation) is a Cree First Nations community centered in Nelson House, Manitoba, Canada. Its main reserve is Nelson House 170.

Nelson House is located about 80 kilometres (50 mi) west of Thompson and is accessible via the mixed paved and gravel Provincial Road 391. The Cree name Nisichawayasihk means, “Where three rivers meet”. The largest community, business and government centre is located at Nelson House on the north shore of Footprint Lake at the convergence of the Burntwood, Footprint, and Rat Rivers. Smaller areas of development occur at Dog Point, R.C, Mission Point and the New Area.

== History ==
The people of Nisichawayasihk are largely ancestral descendants of indigenous Cree peoples who have populated the Canadian Shield region of northern and central Canada since the retreat of the glaciers about 10,000 years ago.

The people of Nisichawayasihk refer to themselves as the Nisichawayasi Nehethowak (Cree from where three rivers meet). The term Rocky Cree (Asiniskaw Ithiniwak- People from where there is an abundance of rocks) is also used to refer to the people of Nisichawayasihk.

During the peak of the Fur trade The Hudson's Bay Company operated a trading post in Nelson House between 1800 and 1827. Many of the Rocky Cree started travelling to the trading post selling furs and other goods.

The Nelson House outpost (also referred to at the time to as Fort Nelson), was established in 1800 on the Churchill River. Men from South Indian Lake were sent to establish a post in Nelson House and construction had begun in 1800. In 1809, the original Nelson House was abandoned and moved to an island three miles west of the old house.

In 1814, the Nelson River District (originally known as the New Churchill District) was established with Nelson House as its headquarters. It acted as such until 1819 when South Indian Lake became its headquarters. Nelson House acted as its headquarters once again in 1824. In 1827, the Nelson House Hudson's Bay Company post was closed due to poor fur returns. This caused many to have to travel to South Indian Lake in order to exchange goods with the traders.

Largely left alone by the Government of Canada during initial colonization and settlement of Western Canada. In the mid-1870s, the Indigenous peoples of the Lake Winnipeg area were interested in making a treaty with the Government of Canada. They had heard about the concessions offered to the Indigenous nations of Treaties 1 to 4, and subsequently demanded the government provide similar economic assistance, provisions of tools and protection against the encroachment of outsiders (such as surveyors and settlers) on their territories. Treaty 5 was the response from the government that ensure the homelands of the Cree were protected for their use. Treaty 5, a document which established that Nisichawayasihk Cree Nation members and their descendants were guaranteed certain rights and benefits.

== Governance and population ==
Nisichawayasihk Cree Nation is governed by an elected chief and council. Elections are held pursuant to NCN's own democratic election code.

About 3,000 members of the NCN live in Nelson House and the remaining 2,100 off the reserve lands. Until 2005, the community of South Indian Lake on the shores of Southern Indian Lake was also part of the NCN. In December 2005, this community of about 1,100 persons separated from the Nisichawayasihk Cree Nation to form the O-Pipon-Na-Piwin Cree Nation.

With a population of approximately 5,200, the NCN is a large and widespread community. Nelson House consists of eleven areas, which are known to the residents as Westwood, School Road, Hillside, Dogpoint, R.C. Point (Named after the Roman Catholic church in the area), Little R.C. Point, New Area, Hart's Point, Michelle Point, Bay Road and Moore's Bay.

Drinking water is drawn from Footprint Lake, treated, and delivered by pipe to about 50% of the community (primarily those who live closer to the main community) with the remainder of residents serviced by five water trucks. The nursing station, elementary school, teacherages and the Three Rivers Store use water delivery trucks and a piped system to obtain treated water.

== Hydroelectric development and impacts ==
During the 1960s and 1970s, the Government of Manitoba and Manitoba Hydro began the Nelson River Hydroelectric Project, centered on the Churchill and Nelson rivers. The project included the Churchill River Diversion, which directly affected Nisichawayasihk members living at Nelson House and at South Indian Lake. Consequently, large areas of traditional hunting, fishing and trapping lands were flooded. The people of South Indian Lake were forcibly relocated to their current location.

The Nisichawayasihk Cree Nation (NCN) is a signatory to the Northern Flood Agreement (NFA) between Canada (the federal government), Manitoba Hydro, the province of Manitoba and several First Nations Communities. In 1996, NCN signed an NFA Implementation Agreement. Using settlement proceeds paid pursuant to this implementation agreement, NCN purchased the Mystery Lake Motor Hotel in the nearby city of Thompson. In 2006, the NCN signed a Project Development Agreement with Manitoba Hydro regarding the Wuskwatim hydroelectric project on the Burntwood River, about 30 km from Nelson House. Wuskwatim generates about 200 MW of electricity. The NCN was involved in the construction of the project and, as a partner in the project, will receive a share of the future revenues. This arrangement is the first of its kind in Manitoba.

In 2006, the Atoskiwin Training and Employment Centre (ATEC) opened its doors in Nelson House. ATEC is also a Manitoba first. It trains NCN members and other aboriginals for northern hydro projects and other job opportunities.

== Reserve lands ==
Nelson House consists of four NCN reserves, totalling 58.5 km^{2} (14,460 acres) in size:

- Nelson House 170 — located on the north shore of Footprint Lake; totalling 18.60 km^{2} (4,600 acres) in size
- Nelson House 170A — located south of the west end of Footprint Lake; totalling 11.615 km^{2} (2,870 acres) in size
- Nelson House 170B — located south of the central part of Footprint Lake; totalling 28.268 km^{2} (6,985 acres) in size
- Nelson House 170C — located on the north-east shore of Footprint Lake; totalling 32,000 m^{2} (7.9 acres) in size

=== Urban reserve ===
In early February 2004, the nearby city of Thompson, Manitoba, announced its approval to the NCN to convert a parcel of property to reserve land. This was possible due to shortages in land area controlled by NCN under the Treaty Land Entitlement agreement in the mid-1990s. This event marked one of the few transitions from privately owned land, purchased by a First Nations community, to an urban reserve.

This plan was quietly discussed between city and band administration since the narrowly-lost plebiscite held in Thompson on 18 September 2001. With a 45% voter turnout for the plebiscite, and amid allegations of inappropriate voter disqualifications, the "no" side won by a margin of 250 votes. During the three years following the plebiscite, the majority of Thompson City Councillors publicly stated that the results of the vote were not binding upon city council, as the council was elected to act in the best interests of the citizens of Thompson.

Thompson City Council approved NCN's plan for the urban reserve on 7 February 2005.

In April 2016, the reserve received an additional 17,020 m^{2} (4.21 acres) of land.
