= Reindeer Lake =

Lake in Western Canada

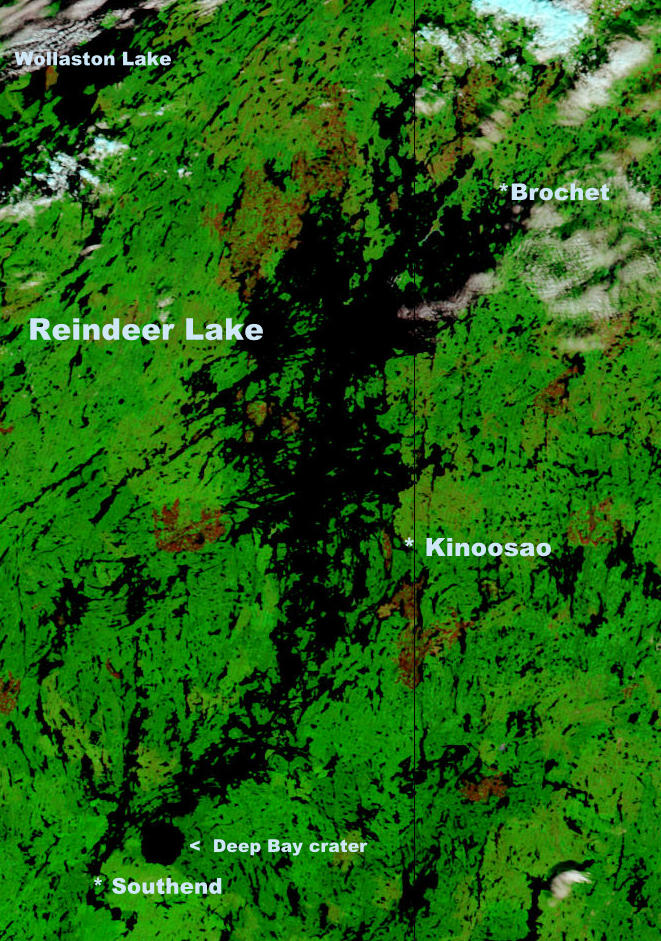
- Satellite map of Reindeer Lake

- Location of Reindeer Lake in Saskatchewan Reindeer Lake (Canada)
- Location: Division No. 18, Saskatchewan / Division No. 23, Manitoba
- Coordinates: 57°18′N 102°22′W
- Lake type: Glacial lake
- Part of: Churchill River drainage basin
- Primary inflows: Cochrane River; Wathaman River
- Primary outflows: Reindeer River
- Catchment area: 60,000 km^{2} (23,000 sq mi)
- Basin countries: Canada
- Max. length: 233 km (145 mi)
- Max. width: 60 km (37 mi)
- Surface area: 6,650 km^{2} (2,570 sq mi)
- Average depth: 17 m (56 ft)
- Max. depth: 219 m (719 ft)
- Water volume: 95.25 km^{3} (22.85 cu mi)
- Residence time: 9
- Shore length^{1}: 3,394 km (2,109 mi)
- Surface elevation: 337 m (1,106 ft)
- Settlements: Kinoosao; Brochet; Southend
- ^{1} Shore length is not a well-defined measure.

Reindeer Lake is a large lake in Western Canada located on the border between north-eastern Saskatchewan and north-western Manitoba. It is the 21st largest lake in the world by area, as well as being the second-largest lake in Saskatchewan and the ninth largest in Canada. Eight percent of the lake lies in Manitoba while 92% of the lake is in Saskatchewan. Formerly called Deer Lake, its name appears to be a translation of the Algonquian name.

Access to the lake is from Saskatchewan's Highways 102 and 994 and Manitoba's Highway 394. Highway 102 ends at the community of Southend at Reindeer Lake's southern end. Highway 394 ends at the Saskatchewan border and carries on as Highway 994 for 1.1 kilometres (0.7 mi) into Kinoosao on the eastern shore.

== Geography ==
Reindeer lake with the Deep Bay Crater in the foreground

Reindeer Lake is a monomictic lake with a heavily indented shoreline and numerous small islands. On its eastern shore is the community of Kinoosao, at its northern end Brochet, Manitoba; and at its southern end, Southend, Saskatchewan. It drains mainly to the south, via the Reindeer River and a controlled weir, to the Churchill River and then east to Hudson Bay. Water flow out of the lake is regulated by the Whitesand Dam.

Its total area (including islands) is 6,650 square kilometres (2,570 sq mi), while its net area (water only) is 5,658 square kilometres (2,185 sq mi).

Deep Bay, located at the south end of the lake and measuring about 13 kilometres (8.1 mi) wide and 220 metres (720 ft) deep, is the site of a large meteorite impact dating to about 99 million years ago. According to local Cree legend, it is also the location of a lake monster.

== History ==
Several early explorers travelled through Reindeer Lake, including David Thompson, who set up a fur-trade post for the Hudson's Bay Company (HBC) on Bedford Island along the west shore in 1796, called Bedford House. While surveying a route to Lake Athabasca, Thompson wintered at Reindeer Lake and abandoned the post in spring 1797.

The following year, Thompson established a new HBC post at the southern end of the west shore. The Reindeer Lake Post (also known as Deer Lake or Deers Lake Post and Clapham House circa 1808) was destroyed by the rival North West Company (NWC) in the spring of 1817, but rebuilt in the fall of 1818. It remained in continuous operation until 1894, except between 1922 and 1824, and between 1872 and 1886 when it operated sporadically.

The NWC also had trading posts on the lake, including Lac des Cariboux Post on Vermilion Point, built sometime before 1790, and Reindeer River Post at the lake's outlet near Southend, operating circa 1792 and 1795).

== Parks and recreation ==
At the southern end of the lake, 5 kilometres (3.1 mi) west of Southend, is Norvil Olson Campground (56.3360°N 103.2825°W), which is a provincial recreation site. The park has a free campground, lake access, and a boat launch. Access is from Highway 102.

Several bays and islands on Reindeer Lake host fishing lodges. Nordic Lodge, which is 2 kilometres (1.2 mi) west of Norvil Olson Campground, is a hunting and fishing outfitters with cabins and lodging. Lawrence Bay Lodge is a camp 56 kilometres (35 mi) north-east of Southend. Access is by water or floatplane.

== Fishing ==
Fishing is an important industry in the area and sport-fishermen are drawn by its clear and deep waters. Trophy-sized pike are common at Reindeer Lake. The lake also supports light commercial fishing. Fish species include walleye, yellow perch, northern pike, lake trout, Arctic grayling, lake whitefish, cisco, round whitefish, burbot, white sucker, goldeye, and longnose sucker.

== NORAD Tracks Santa ==
Reindeer Lake was a featured Santa Cam location from the start of the 2002 NORAD Tracks Santa tracking season to the end of the 2011 season when NORAD opted to switch to a regional format the next year instead of the individual profiling of cities they had been doing.

== See also ==
- List of lakes of Saskatchewan
- List of lakes of Manitoba
