= Mystery Mountain Winter Park =

Ski park in Mystery Lake, Manitoba, Canada

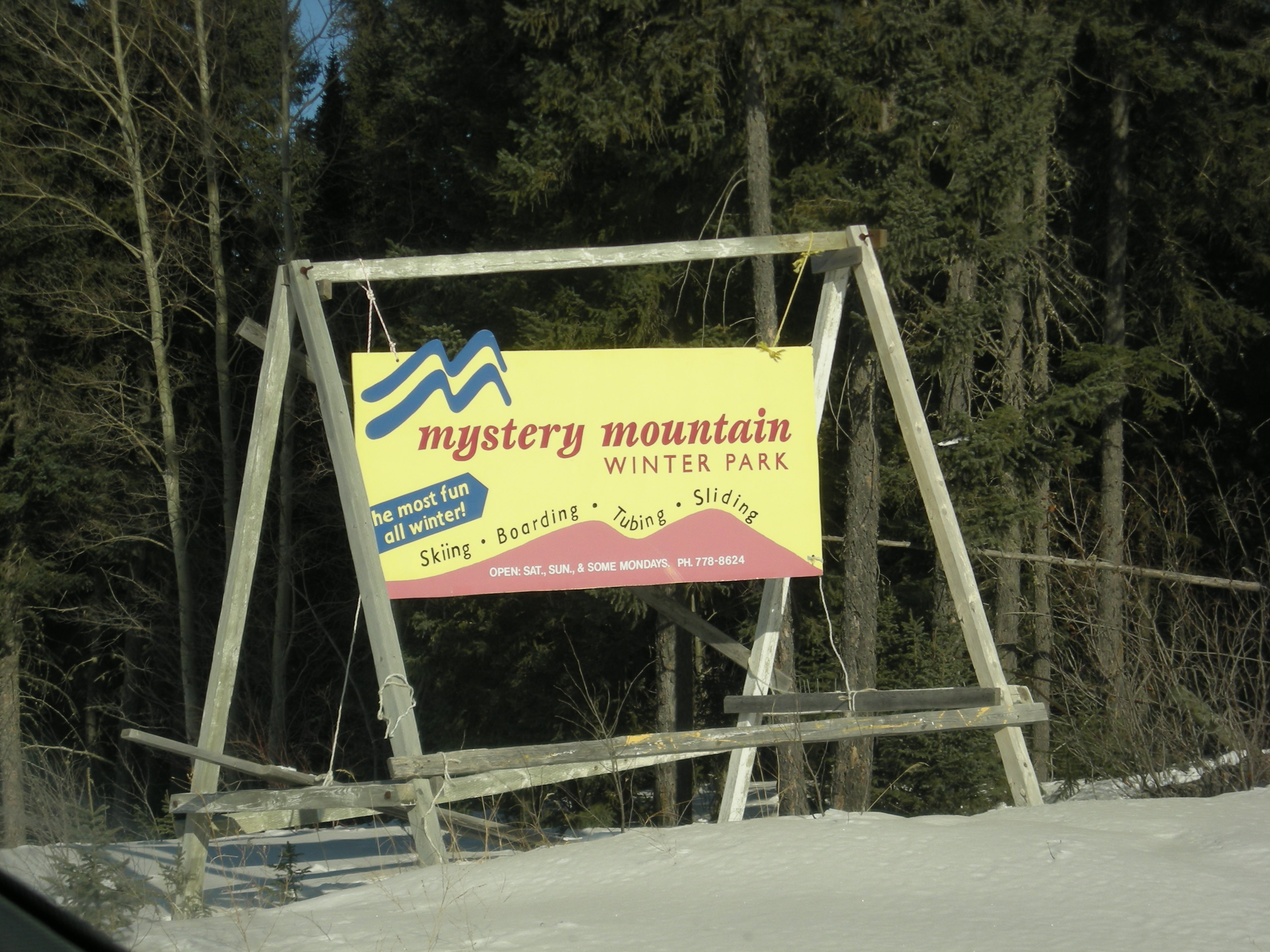
- Sign at the entrance of Mystery Mountain Winter Park
- Interactive map of Mystery Mountain Winter Park
- Location: Mystery Lake, Manitoba
- Nearest city: Thompson, Manitoba
- Coordinates: 55.8716°N 97.7789°W
- Total length: 22 km (14 mi)
- Lift system: 4 lifts servicing over 18 runs
- Website: mysterymountain.ca/

Mystery Mountain Winter Park is a small ski park in Mystery Lake, Manitoba, Canada. It is located 20 minutes north of Thompson on Highway Provincial Road 280.

It is run by the not-for-profit organization, Thompson Ski Club Inc. It has 18 runs and 5 lifts.
