= Granville Lake =

Indian settlement in Manitoba, Canada

Granville Lake ᐅᑳᐏᒥᖨᐦᑳᓈᓂ okâwimithihkânâni
- Indian settlement
- Location of Granville Lake in Manitoba
- Coordinates: 56°13′52″N 100°34′07″W
- Country: Canada
- Province: Manitoba
- Region: Northern Region
- Census division: 23

Government
  - (Flin Flon): Gerard Jennissen (NDP)
  - MP (Churchill): Niki Ashton (NDP)

Area (2006)
  - Total: 2.33 km^{2} (0.90 sq mi)

Population (2025)
  - Total: 12
  - Density: 5.2/km^{2} (13/sq mi)
- Time zone: UTC−6 (CST)
  - Summer (DST): UTC−5 (CDT)
- Postal code: R0B
- Area code: 204

Granville Lake (Cree: ᐅᑳᐏᒥᖨᐦᑳᓈᓂ, okâwimithihkânâni) is an Indian settlement located on a peninsula on the south shore of Granville Lake (part of the Churchill River system) in northern Manitoba. The community is primarily a settlement of the Mathias Colomb First Nation, who now live in nearby Leaf Rapids.

The community does not have all-weather road access; rather, the community relies on ice roads in the winter and the lake-river system in the summer.

In the 2006 census, Granville Lake had a population of 98 living in 16 dwellings, a 42.0% increase from 2001. At that time, the settlement had a land area of 2.33 km^{2} (0.90 sq mi) and a population density of 42.0/km^{2} (109/sq mi). In 2011, its population dropped to just 10 inhabitants, as the community shifted to Leaf Rapids. In 2025, the estimated population was 12.
