= XSI =

XSI may refer to:

- Softimage XSI, a high-end three-dimensional (3D) graphics application
- .XSI, Softimage file format for scene data
- South Indian Lake Airport, the IATA code for the airport in Canada
- Canon EOS 450D, known as EOS Rebel XSi in North America, a DSLR camera from Canon
- X/Open System Interfaces Extension, a supplementary specification to the Single UNIX Specification
- A conventional XML namespace prefix for XML Schema instance information
- Broadsoft Xtended Services Interface, a set of APIs for integrating BroadWorks functions with Internet services
