= Saskatchewan Highway 994 =

Provincial highway in Saskatchewan, Canada

Highway 994

Route information
- Maintained by Ministry of Highways and Infrastructure
- Length: 1.54 km (0.96 mi)

Major junctions
- West end: Dead end at Reindeer Lake in Kinoosao
- East end: PR 394 outside of Kinoosao

Location
- Country: Canada
- Province: Saskatchewan

Highway system
- Provincial highways in Saskatchewan
← Highway 984	→ Highway 995

Highway 994 is a provincial highway in the far north region of the Canadian province of Saskatchewan. It is one of the province's shortest highways at 1.54 kilometres (0.96 mi) long. The highway provides access to the isolated community of Kinoosao. Due to its geographic location, it is one of only two provincial highways in Saskatchewan that requires entering the neighbouring province of Manitoba to travel it, the other is Highway 967. The route begins at the shores of Reindeer Lake in Kinoosao and heads east a short distance to the provincial line, where it continues eastward as Manitoba Provincial Road 394 towards Lynn Lake, Manitoba.

== Route description ==
Highway 994 officially starts at the Manitoba/Saskatchewan border where Provincial Road 394 ends. About 1.1 kilometres (0.68 mi) from the border, Highway 994 passes through the community of Kinoosao. It ends about 400 metres (1,300 ft) later, on the shore of Reindeer Lake, as the means of access to the largest employer in the region, the fish processing plant.

== Bridge replacement ==
There were plans to build or replace a bridge along Highway 994 along Reindeer Lake in Kinoosao during the 2008–09 fiscal year.

== Major intersections ==
The entire route is in Kinoosao.

km	mi	Destinations	Notes
0.00	0.00	End of roadway	Western terminus of Route 994; dead end at Reindeer Lake
1.54	0.96	PR 394 – Lynn Lake	Eastern terminus of Route 994; Manitoba provincial line
1.000 mi = 1.609 km; 1.000 km = 0.621 mi

== See also ==
- Roads in Saskatchewan
- Transportation in Saskatchewan
