= Manitoba Provincial Road 394 =

Provincial road in Manitoba, Canada

Provincial Road 394
- PR 394 highlighted in red

Route information
- Maintained by Manitoba Infrastructure and Transportation
- Length: 96.47 km (59.94 mi)
- Existed: 1966–present

Major junctions
- South end: PR 391 in Lynn Lake
- PR 398 near Burge Lake Provincial Park
- North end: Highway 994 at the Manitoba–Saskatchewan provincial border

Location
- Country: Canada
- Province: Manitoba
- Towns: Lynn Lake

Highway system
- Provincial highways in Manitoba; Winnipeg City Routes
← PR 393	→ PR 396

Provincial Road 394 (PR 394) is a 96.47-kilometre (59.94 mi) long gravel provincial highway in northwestern Manitoba. The route, the furthest northwest in the province, begins at an intersection with PR 391 in the town of Lynn Lake. The primary feature of PR 394 is the numerous lakes that the route passes, such as Zed and Vandekerckhove. The route terminates at the Saskatchewan provincial line, where it becomes Highway 994, a connector to the community of Kinoosao.

PR 394 was first constructed in 1961 as a gravel road from Lynn Lake and the Canadian National Railway to the east of Zed Lake. In 1962, it was extended to the provincial line with the connector at Co-Op Point to modern-day Kinoosao. The route was designated in 1966, along with the majority of the provincial highway system in Lynn Lake.

== Route description ==
PR 394 begins at an intersection with PR 391 and PR 396 (Sherritt Avenue) in the town of Lynn Lake. PR 394 runs northwest along Silver Street, passing through downtown Lynn Lake and north of the Marcel Colomb First Nation. After the intersection with Cobalt Street, the route leaves downtown Lynn Lake, passing east of the Lynn Lake Airport. PR 394 parallels the runway for the airport, passing the southwestern shore of Burge Lake, making a bend to the northwest and into an intersection with the southern terminus of PR 398, which connects to Burge Lake Provincial Park.

After PR 398, the route bends southwest along the shores of Barbara Lake. At the southwestern shore of the lake, PR 394 turns northwest, passing Ralph Lake. For a stretch of PR 394 heading northwestward, the route becomes a two-lane unpaved road through the lakes of northwestern Manitoba. Approaching the shores of Zed Lake, the route turns northward near the shores of the lake and passes by Zed Lake Provincial Park. PR 394 turns northwest again, crosses north of Zed Lake and turns northward at Vandekerckhove Lake. The route continued making these turns to the north and to the west for a while, passing the north of several lakes, including Vandekerckhove Lake. Along the northern shore of Vandekerckhove, PR 394 makes one of its few southwestern jobs, before turning west after the lake.

PR 394 continues northwest through more lakes before jogging northwestward and soon southwestward. After another long westward jog, the route reaches the Saskatchewan provincial border in the locale of Co-Op Point, where the route becomes Highway 994, a 2-kilometre (1.2 mi) long connector to Kinoosao. The junction marks the terminus of PR 394, 96.3 kilometres (59.8 mi) from Lynn Lake.

== History ==
In 1961, the province of Manitoba had a segment in Lynn Lake of road that was paved with gravel from the junction with the Canadian National Railway. The road went through downtown Lynn Lake and followed modern day PR 394's route up to a section to the east of Zed Lake. After Zed Lake, the route fell to a trail out to Garth Lake in Saskatchewan, south of modern-day Kinoosao. By the next year, the gravel road had been extended to the Saskatchewan provincial line at Co-Op Point to modern-day Kinoosao. In 1963, the section from Zed Lake to Co-Op Point was turned into an improved earth road, and by 1966, the route had become designated as PR 394 as far as Vandekerckhove Lake. The junction with PR 398 was also designated at the same time.

== Junction list ==
Division	Location	km	mi	Destinations	Notes
Town of Lynn Lake		0.00	0.00	PR 391 (Tom Cochrane's Life is a Highway / Sherritt Avenue) – Leaf Rapids, Fox Lake	Eastern terminus
Town of Lynn Lake		5.5	3.4	PR 398 north – Burge Lake Provincial Park	Southern terminus of PR 398
Town of Lynn Lake		19.0	11.8	Zed Lake Provincial Park	Access road into park
No. 23		45.8	28.5	Winter Road – Brochet, Lac Brochet, Tadoule Lake	Seasonal access road
No. 23		96.47	59.94	Highway 994 west – Kinoosao	Continuation into Saskatchewan; western terminus
1.000 mi = 1.609 km; 1.000 km = 0.621 mi

== Related route ==
Provincial Road 398
- Location: Burge Lake Provincial Park
- Length: 1.34 km (0.83 mi)
- Existed: 1966–present

Provincial Road 398 (PR 398) is a short 1.34-kilometre-long (0.83 mi) north-south spur of PR 394 within the boundaries of the town of Lynn Lake, providing road access to Burge Lake Provincial Park. It is entirely a two-lane gravel road.

Division	Location	km	mi	Destinations	Notes
Town of Lynn Lake		0.0	0.0	PR 394 (Silver Street) – Lynn Lake, Kinoosao	Southern terminus
Town of Lynn Lake		1.34	0.83	Burge Lake Provincial Park	Dead end at boat launch; northern terminus
1.000 mi = 1.609 km; 1.000 km = 0.621 mi
