= Kinoosao =

Community in Saskatchewan, Canada

Location of Kinoosao in Saskatchewan

Kinoosao (Woods Cree: ᑭᓄᓭᐤ, romanized: kinosêw, lit. 'fish') is an isolated community in northern Saskatchewan, Canada on the east side of Reindeer Lake. It is accessible by road only over Manitoba Provincial Road 394 and Saskatchewan Highway 994, coming from the closest town, over 95 kilometres (59 mi) away, Lynn Lake, Manitoba. Kinoosao is one of two communities in Saskatchewan accessible by road solely by first entering a neighbouring province (Manitoba), the other being Sturgeon Landing. It is 6.5 kilometres (4.0 mi) wide in size and is located in Division 18 in Saskatchewan. It is at 57.081993°N 102.01934°W.

A total of 60 people lived there in May 2006, within 16 dwellings.

The name "Kinoosao" is the Cree language term for "fish". Two other towns in Canada have names derived from the Cree word: Kinuso, Alberta, and Kinistino, Saskatchewan. Kinoosao is one of eight communities of the Peter Ballantyne Cree Nation.

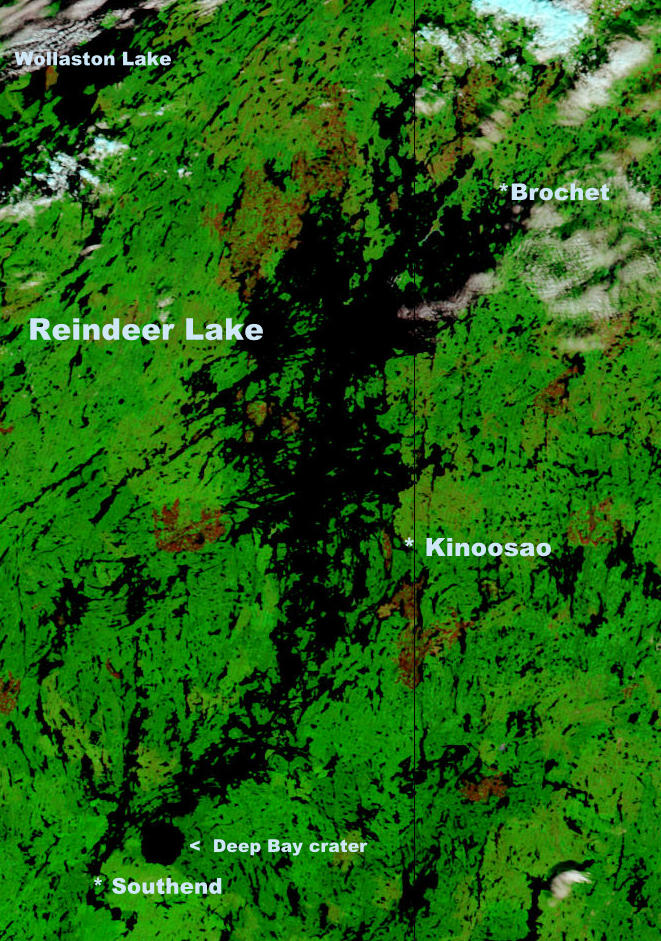
Location of Kinoosao on a NASA satellite map of Reindeer Lake

== History ==
The community of Kinoosao began in November 1952, when a fisherman's co-operative wanted to build a fish-filleting plant to help serve the communities along Reindeer Lake. Mail service to the community began in 1954, when they received it twice-monthly from La Ronge.

== Services ==
No restaurants, hotels, or campgrounds exist in the community off the coast off Reindeer Lake.

== See also ==
- List of communities in Saskatchewan
