= Reindeer River (Saskatchewan) =

River in Saskatchewan

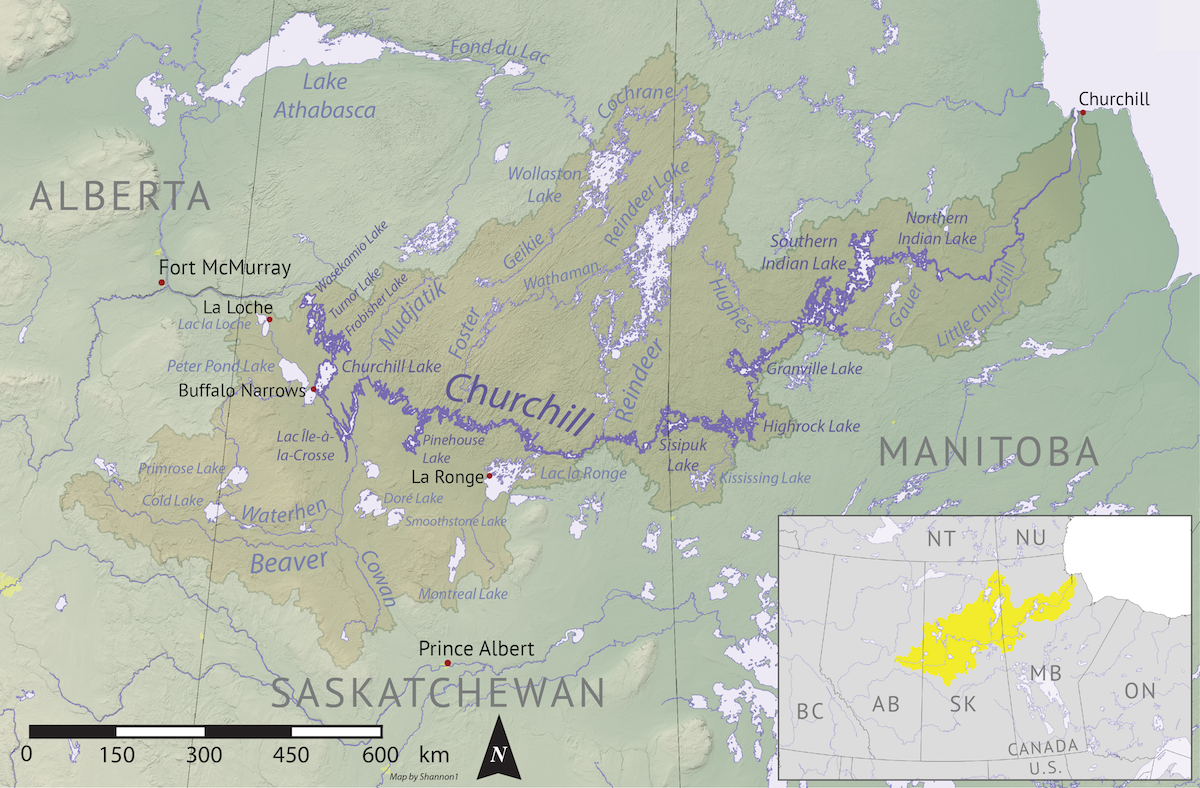
- Churchill River drainage basin

- Location of the mouth of the Reindeer River

Location
- Country: Canada
- Province: Saskatchewan

Physical characteristics
- Source: Reindeer Lake
  - coordinates: 56°20′20″N 103°13′30″W
  - elevation: 337 m (1,106 ft)
- Mouth: Churchill River
  - coordinates: 55°36′0″N 103°11′1″W
- Length: 100 km (62 mi)

Basin features
- River system: Churchill River drainage basin

The Reindeer River is a river in northern Saskatchewan in the Canadian Shield. It flows south from Reindeer Lake to the Churchill River. The river's flow is regulated by the Whitesand Dam (56°14′8″N 103°08′57″W) located between Marchand Lake and Fafard Lake.

Access is by Highway 102 that ends at the community of Southend.

== See also ==
- List of reservoirs by surface area
- List of rivers of Saskatchewan
- Hudson Bay drainage basin
