= Zed Lake Provincial Park =

Provincial park in Manitoba, Canada

- Location within Manitoba
- Interactive map of Zed Lake Provincial Park
- Location: Northern Region, Manitoba
- Nearest city: Lynn Lake
- Coordinates: 56°54′38″N 101°14′31″W
- Area: 12.07 ha (29.8 acres)
- Created: 1961

Zed Lake Provincial Park is a provincial park in Manitoba, Canada, established in 1961. It is 12.07 ha (29.8 acres) in size. The park is located on the east shore of the eponymous lake, about 27 kilometres (17 mi) north of Lynn Lake on PR 394. The park has 25 cottage lots, a campground, a boat launch and a beach.

Zed Lake is part of the Churchill River watershed, lying between Vandekerckhove Lake and Goldsand Lake. Jack pine and black spruce grow in open stands with a ground cover of lichens. The park is within the Churchill River Upland ecoregion of the Boreal Shield ecozone. Zed Lake greywacke is found to the east and the south of the lake. Its presence is an indication of an ancient ocean that existed approximately 1.88 billion years ago.

== See also ==
- List of protected areas of Manitoba
- List of provincial parks in Manitoba
