= O-Pipon-Na-Piwin Cree Nation =

The O-Pipon-Na-Piwin Cree Nation (Cree: ᐅᐱᐴᓇᐱᐏᐣ, opiponipîwin) is a First Nations band government with over 1,500 Cree registered members centred in the settlement of South Indian Lake in Manitoba, Canada. South Indian Lake is located on the southeast shores of Southern Indian Lake, about 130 km (81 mi) (by air) north of the city of Thompson.

The O-Pipon-Na-Piwin Nation's reserve lands include about 113 square kilometres (44 sq mi) of land.

== History ==
Created in December 2005, the O-Pipon-Na-Piwin Cree Nation was formerly part of the Nisichawayasihk Cree Nation which includes the Cree community of Nelson House. The South Indian Lake community, which was founded in 1875, was historically the second largest community of the Nisichawayasihk Cree Nation, with about a quarter of the total population. In 1995, after many decades of discussions, a memorandum of understanding was signed between the federal and provincial governments and First Nation representatives to formalize a process to have the Southern Indian Lake community recognized as a separate Cree Nation.

== Demographics ==
As of March 2015, O-Pipon-Na-Piwin Cree Nation had a registered membership of 1,586 with 1,124 members living on-reserve and 462 members living off-reserve.
