= Burge Lake Provincial Park =

Park in Manitoba, Canada

- Location within Manitoba
- Interactive map of Burge Lake Provincial Park
- Location: Northern Region, Manitoba
- Nearest city: Lynn Lake
- Coordinates: 56°54′8″N 101°2′6″W
- Area: 6.12 ha (15.1 acres)
- Created: 1961

Burge Lake Provincial Park was established in 1961 and is 6.12 ha (15.1 acres) in size. It is located on the west shore of the lake, about 10 km. north of Lynn Lake off PTR 394 The park has a small cottage subdivision, a campground, a boat launch and a beach with a playground.

Burge Lake belongs to the Churchill River watershed, draining into Goldsand Lake. It is the site of the annual catch and release fishing derby for northern pike held on Canada Day.

== See also ==
- List of protected areas of Manitoba
- List of provincial parks in Manitoba
