= Whitesand Dam =

Dam in Saskatchewan, Canada

Coordinates: 56.2341°N 103.1476°W

Dam location on Reindeer Lake

The Whitesand Dam lies on the Reindeer River in Saskatchewan, a tributary of the Churchill River. It regulates the outflow from Reindeer Lake.

The dam was built in 1942, as a way of regulating flows to Island Falls Dam and hydropower station. Both dams were operated by the Hudson Bay Mining and Smelting company, and were sold to the Saskatchewan Power Corporation in 1983.

Flooding caused by the dam has been the subject of a legal battle going back to 2004, particularly focussing on impacts on the Southend community of the Peter Ballantyne Cree Nation.

== See also ==
- List of dams and reservoirs in Canada
