= Tataskweyak Cree Nation =

- ᑕᑕᐢᑿᔭᕽ tataskwayakf
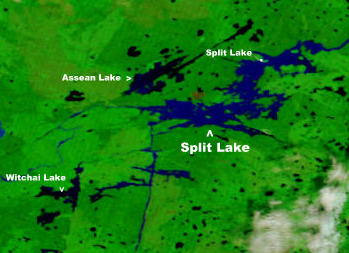
- Location of Split Lake in Manitoba
- People: Cree
- Treaty: Treaty 5
- Headquarters: Split Lake, Manitoba

Land
- Main reserve: Split Lake 171
- Reserves: Split Lake 171A, Split Lake 171B
- Land area: 168.65 km^{2} (65.12 sq mi)

Population (2024)
- On reserve: 2,481
- Total population: 4,202

Tribal Council
- Keewatin Tribal Council

Website
- tcncree.ca

The Tataskweyak Cree Nation (Cree: ᑕᑕᐢᑿᔭᕽ, tataskwayak) (Formerly known as Split Lake Cree First Nation in English) is a First Nations band government whose primary community is located at Split Lake, Manitoba, on the Nelson River system. Despite its remote location, it is serviced by Provincial Road 280, which connects the community to Thompson.

The Split Lake band have entered into an agreement with Manitoba Hydro regarding potential hydroelectric development at Keeyask Rapids.

Its main reserve is Split Lake 171 (56°14′43″N 96°05′38″W).
