= Split Lake (New Zealand) =

Lake in New Zealand

- Location within Northland Region
- Location: Northland Region, North Island
- Coordinates: 35.0664454°S 173.1825684°E
- Basin countries: New Zealand

Split Lake is a small lake in the north of Northland Region, New Zealand. It is near to the coast of the Tasman Sea and Ahipara Bay.

== See also ==
- List of lakes in New Zealand
