= Split Lake (Manitoba) =

Lake in Manitoba, Canada

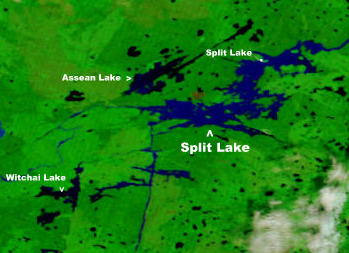
- Split Lake in Manitoba

- Location of the lake in Manitoba Split Lake (Canada)
- Location: Division No. 22, Northern Manitoba
- Coordinates: 56°9′N 96°11′W
- Primary inflows: Nelson River, Burntwood River
- Primary outflows: Nelson River
- Basin countries: Canada
- Max. length: 46 kilometres (29 mi)
- Surface elevation: 167 metres (548 ft)

Split Lake is a lake on the Nelson River in Manitoba, Canada. The settlement of Split Lake is located on a peninsula on the northern shore. The lake is about 46 km (29 miles) long.

The Burntwood River and the Nelson River flows into the west end of Split Lake. The Grass River joins the Nelson just before it enters the lake. The Nelson flows east out from the east end of the lake, flowing into the Clark Lake.

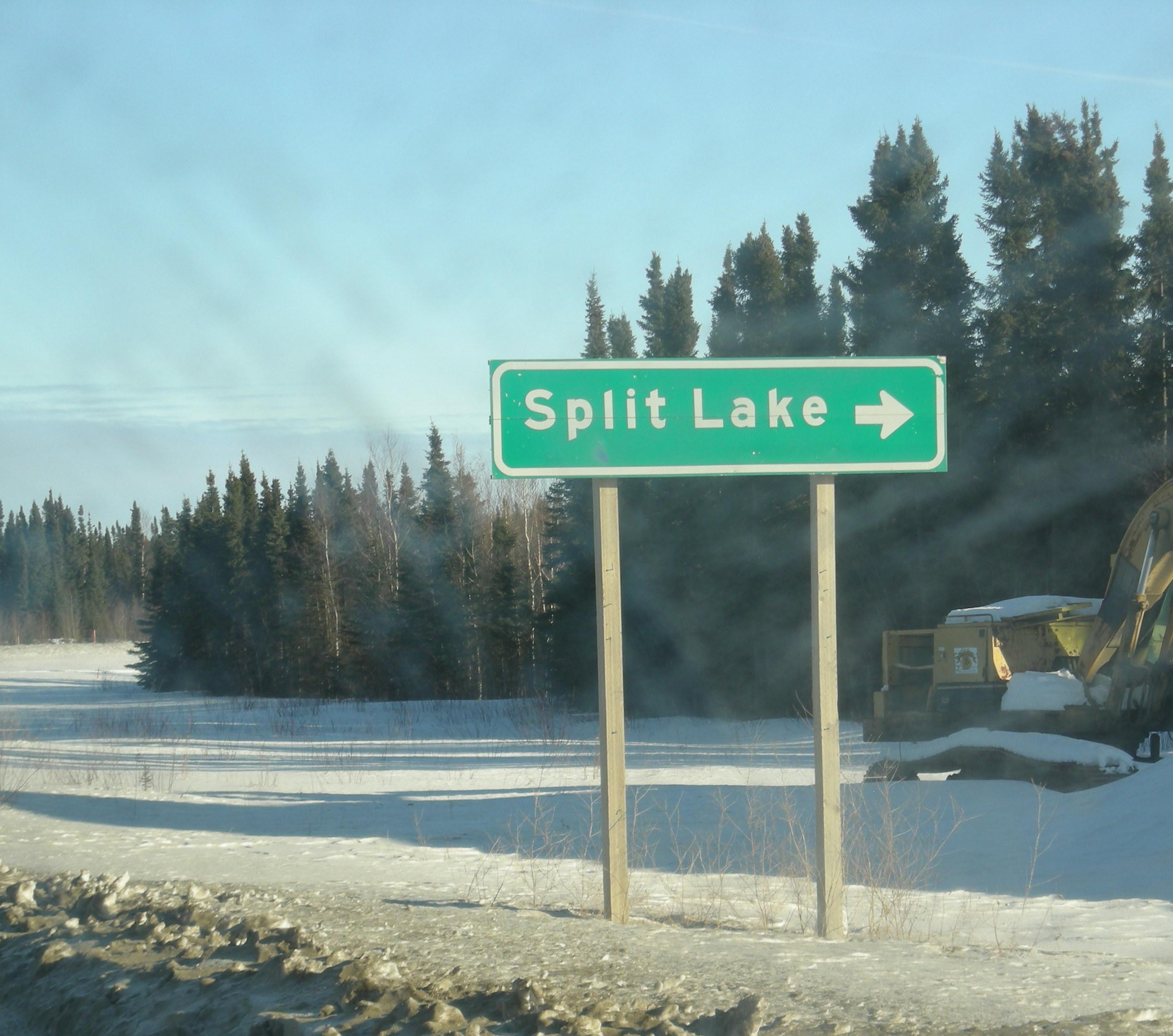
Split Lake Roadsign

The Hudson's Bay Company had a temporary post here in 1798–99.

== See also ==
- List of lakes of Manitoba
