= Otter Nelson River School =

Otter Nelson River

Location
- Cross Lake, Manitoba, R0B 0J0; Canada
- Coordinates: 54.6104°N 97.7663°W

Information
- School type: Elementary and High School (Secondary Education)
- Motto: Building Better Futures For Our Youth
- School district: Cross Lake Education Authority
- Principal: Clarence Haney
- Grades: Grades 1-4 and 9-12
- Enrollment: 1055 (2005-2006)
- Language: English/Cree
- Area: South side Cross Lake (Natimek)
- Colours: Maroon and White
- Mascot: Nikik (Otter)
- Team name: O.N.R Nikiks
- Website: www.clea.mb.ca

Otter Nelson River School is an elementary and high school located at Cross Lake, Manitoba, at the south end of the community. The school teaches grades 1 to 4 and grades 9 to 12 and has approximately 1000 students.

In 2013, Otter Nelson River won an award from the Assembly of First Nations for a video created by students about their school.

== Curriculum and sports ==
The school teaches Math, English, Science, Chemistry, Physics, Biology, Global Issues, Geography, and First Nation Languages and Studies.

The school's sports include Basketball, Cross-country, Volleyball, Track and Field, Soccer, and Wrestling.

== Darts Multiplex ==
A Darts Multiplex has been under construction in Cross Lake since their run to the MHSAA Darts Final Four in 2011. The facility is expected to be completed by early 2014.

== Leadership ==
As of 2016, the principal was Gordon Hum.
