= Division No. 23, Manitoba =

Census division in Canada

Coordinates: 57°35′N 95°30′W

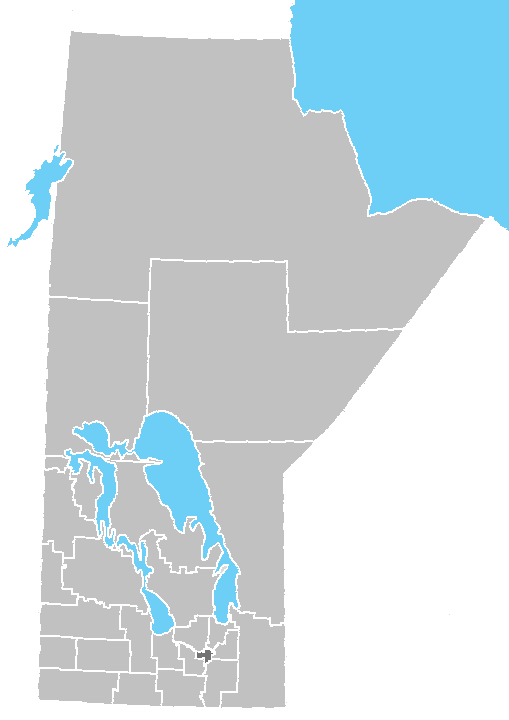

Census Division No. 23 (Churchill - Northern Manitoba) is a census division located within the Northern Region of the Province of Manitoba, Canada. Unlike in some other provinces, census divisions do not reflect the organization of local government in Manitoba. These areas exist solely for the purposes of statistical analysis and presentation; they have no government of their own.

The census division contains the Atlantic deep sea Port of Churchill.

The population of the census division was 8,252 in the 2006 census. The census division has a very diversified economic base ranging from mining, forestry, trapping, transportation and arctic resupply escorting.

== Demographics ==
In the 2021 Census of Population conducted by Statistics Canada, Division No. 23 had a population of 4,690 living in 1,529 of its 2,293 total private dwellings, a change of −47.7% from its 2016 population of 8,971. With a land area of 233,578.64 km^{2} (90,185.22 sq mi), it had a population density of 0.0/km^{2} (0.1/sq mi) in 2021.

== Towns ==
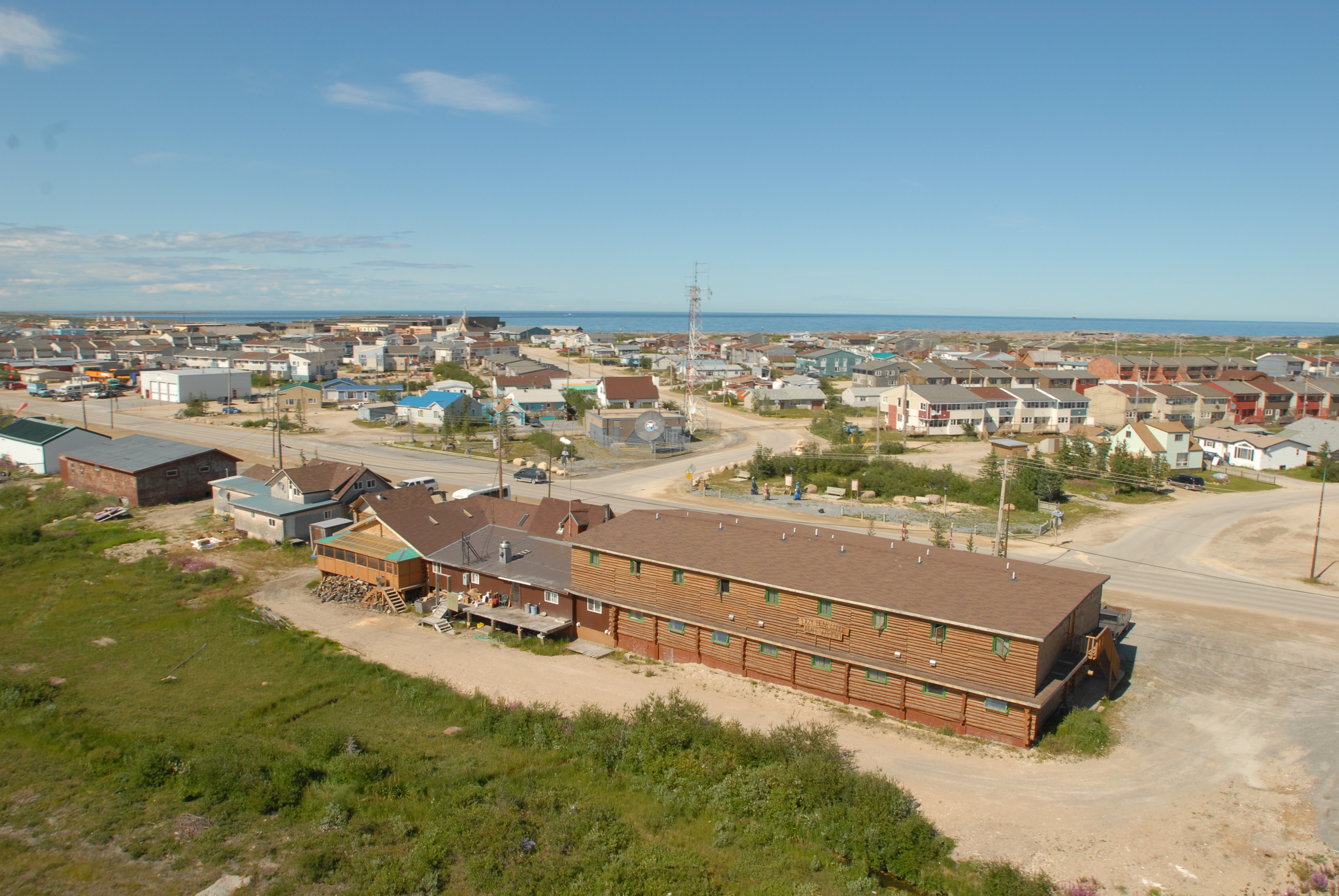
View of Churchill in 2010

- Churchill
- Gillam
- Leaf Rapids
- Lynn Lake

== First Nations reserves ==
- Black Sturgeon
- Brochet 197
- Fox Lake 2
- Granville Lake
- Highrock 199
- Lac Brochet 197A
- Pukatawagan 198
- Shamattawa 1
- South Indian Lake
- Tadoule Lake

== Unorganized Area ==
- Unorganized Division No. 23

== See also ==
- Northern Manitoba
