= Long Plain School =

- U.S. National Register of Historic Places
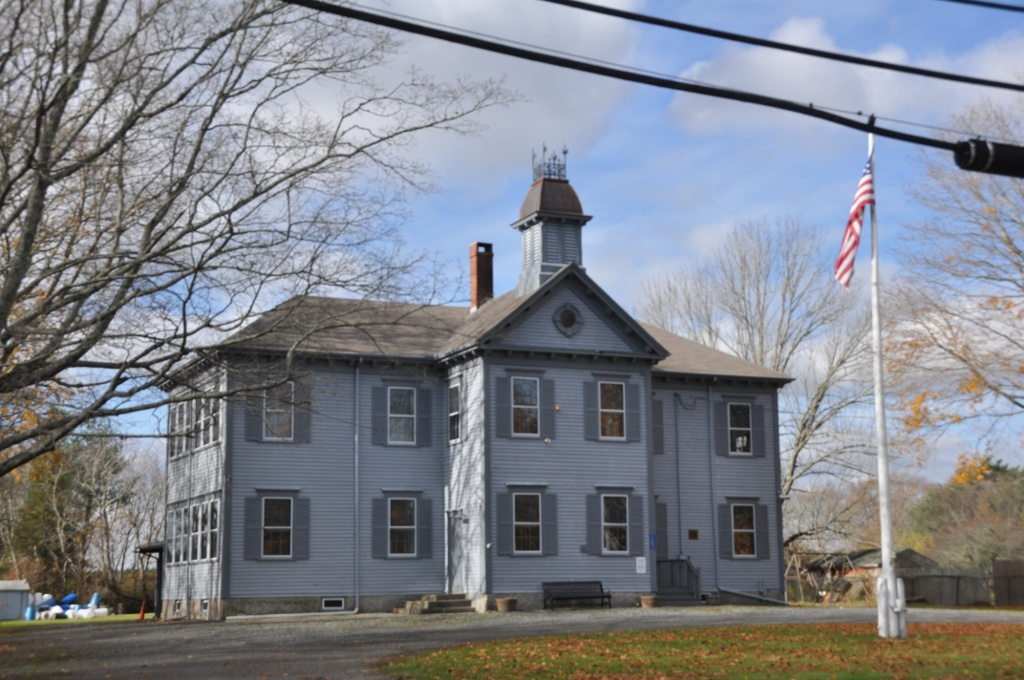

- Location within Massachusetts Location within the United States
- Location: 1203 Main Street, Acushnet, Massachusetts
- Coordinates: 41°44′17″N 70°53′48″W
- Built: 1875
- Architect: Caleb Hammond
- Architectural style: Italianate
- NRHP reference No.: 12000413
- Added to NRHP: July 17, 2012

The Long Plain School is a historic school building at 1203 Main Street in Acushnet, Massachusetts. The two story wood-frame building was built in 1875 to a design by New Bedford architect Caleb Hammond. The building has a hip roof and a projecting central pavilion that rises to a fully pedimented gable and is topped by a Gothic style turret. Entries to the building are on the sides of this projecting pavilion. The pediment and the roof cornice are studded with brackets, and the tympanum of the pediment has an oculus window. The building was originally four bays wide and was extended in 1924 to six. Other 20th century additions were made to its rear.

When built, the building had two classrooms and served as an elementary school. The modifications in 1924 expanded it to four classrooms, two on each floor. The school was closed between 1947 and 1950 due to low enrollment numbers, and was taken out of service as a school building in 1972. It has served as the Long Plain Museum, operated by the Acushnet Historical Society, since 1975.

The building was listed on the National Register of Historic Places in 2012.

== See also ==
- National Register of Historic Places listings in Bristol County, Massachusetts
