= Split Lake, Manitoba =

Split Lake ᑕᑕᐢᑿᔭᕽ
- Unincorporated community
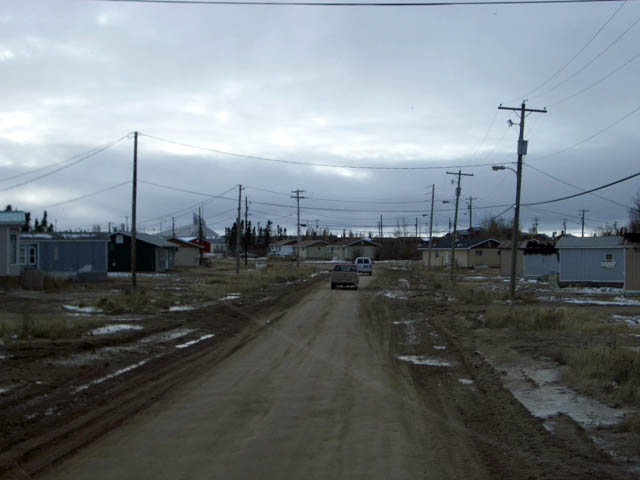
- Split Lake, from PR 280, in 2007

- Location in Canada Location in Manitoba
- Coordinates: 56°14′43″N 96°05′38″W
- Country: Canada
- Province: Manitoba
- Region: Northern Manitoba
- Census divisions: 22, 23

Government
  - Type: Chief & Council
  - Chief: Doreen Spence
  - Councillors: Abbie Garson-Wavey, Alwyn Keeper, Ivan Keeper, Cynthia Ouskun, Joan Ouskun

Area
  - Total: 130.23 km^{2} (50.28 sq mi)

Population (2021)
  - Total: 2,232
  - Density: 17.1/km^{2} (44/sq mi)
- Time zone: UTC−6 (CST)
  - Summer (DST): UTC−5 (CDT)
- Postal code: R0B 1P0
- Area codes: 204, 431
- Provincial Road: PR 280

Split Lake, or Tataskwayak (Cree: ᑕᑕᐢᑿᔭᕽ), is a community in Manitoba on the northern shore of Split Lake along the Nelson River, about 240 mi (390 km) west southwest of the river's mouth at Hudson Bay, and is within the Tataskweyak Cree Nation reserve, Split Lake 171. The community is located 143 km (89 mi) northeast of Thompson, roughly the halfway point of PR 280 in Northern Manitoba, and 169 km (105 mi) west of Gillam.

== History ==
In 1908, Tataskweyak Cree Nation (Split Lake Band) representatives signed an adhesion to Treaty 5.

Tataskweyak Cree Nation is a dry reserve and well known for being one of the wealthiest First Nations in Northern Manitoba. With an employment rate of 30.3% in 2016, Tataskweyak Cree Nation provides a variety of jobs with preference to band members in Education, Healthcare, Trades, Sales and Services. Tataskweyak Cree Nation provides Policing with their own First Nation Security Officers, Child and Family Services which is currently under transformation for more control over their own laws and practices. Jordan’s Principal also offers services to provide a child-first and needs-based to members on and off reserve. The community of Split Lake has their best efforts coming out of multiple programs providing many benefits for its entire population. As of 2024 there are 4,253 registered band members of Tatasweyak Cree Nation, 2,371 on reserve and 1,746 off reserve.Split Lake has had a high number of youth suicides in the year of 2021.

== Geography ==
Split Lake is on the Hudson Bay Railway line that ends at the Port of Churchill.

The community of Split Lake is located on a peninsula on the northern shore of Split Lake. The Burntwood River and the Nelson River flows into the west end of Split Lake. The Grass River (Manitoba) joins the Nelson just before it enters the lake. The Nelson flows east out from the east end of the lake.

== Culture ==
The community also has an annual ice fishing derby, where the first prize is usually a vehicle, as sometimes it has cash prizes, as well as a sporting event every year which is called "indian days".

Tataskweyak is known for their New year celebrations where the community gathers and welcomes people from all over the Manitoba Province to celebrate the New Years with events and entertainment from multiple acts. Including talents from Square dancing to Music competition, it is looked forward to every year from its community members. In the month of August every year, Tataskweyak Annual Treaty and Indian Days are one week events of competitions open to all its members, i.e toddlers, teens, adults and seniors. Indian days are well celebrated weeks that has multiple cash prizes, many merchandise prizes, giveaways, sports events, water events, tournaments and traditional Leisure activities.

Also, not only in August do they celebrate they also provide the same community fun where they host the annual Winterfest usually in the months of March–April, where family winter fun is celebrated from Winter Games, Snowshoe activities, ice fishing activities, traditional outdoor teachings, every year crowning their King and Queen Trapper.

== Demographics ==
Population census
Year	Pop.	±%
1996	1,500	—
2001	1,581	+5.4%
2006	1,819	+15.1%
2011	2,107	+15.8%
2016	2,044	−3.0%
2021	2,232	+9.2%
Source: Statistics Canada

In the 2021 Census of Population conducted by Statistics Canada, Split Lake had a population of 2,232 living in 410 of its 421 total private dwellings, a change of +9.2% from its 2016 population of 2,044. With a land area of 130.23 km^{2} (50.28 sq mi), it had a population density of 17.1/km^{2} (44.4/sq mi) in 2021.
