= Unorganized Division No. 23, Manitoba =

Census subdivision of Manitoba, Canada

Division No. 23, Unorganized, or North Manitoba Unorganized, is an unorganized area within the defined region of Northern Manitoba, Canada. It consists of all of Census Division No. 23 excluding municipalities and reserves. Unlike in some other provinces, census divisions do not reflect the organization of local government in Manitoba. These areas exist solely for the purposes of statistical analysis and presentation; they have no government of their own.

== Demographics ==
The unorganized census division has a population of 171 as of 2006, and an area of 238,004.86 km^{2}.

== See also ==
- Northern Manitoba
