= Mystery Lake, Manitoba =

Mystery Lake
- Local government district
- Location of Mystery Lake in Manitoba
- Coordinates: 55°33′N 98°00′W
- Country: Canada
- Province: Manitoba
- Region: Northern
- Census division: No. 22
- Established: December 5, 1956; 69 years ago

Government
  - (Thompson): Eric Redhead (NDP)
  - MP (Churchill): Rebecca Chartrand (Liberal)

Area
  - Land: 3,460.46 km^{2} (1,336.09 sq mi)

Population (2016)
  - Total: 0
  - Density: 0/km^{2} (0/sq mi)
- Time zone: UTC−6 (CST)
  - Summer (DST): UTC−5 (CDT)
- Postal code: R8N
- Area code: 204
- Highways: PR 280

Mystery Lake is a local government district (LGD) in northern Manitoba. It surrounds the city of Thompson, although most of its territory lies to the southwest and south of the city. It is named after Mystery Lake, a lake located in the northeast section of the LGD, northeast of Thompson.

== Community ==
- Moak Lake

== Demographics ==
In the 2021 and 2016 Canadian censuses, Mystery Lake had a population of 0 and a land area of 3,351.37 km^{2} (1,293.97 sq mi).
