= South Indian Lake =

Coordinates: 56°46′49″N 98°55′49″W

Location of South Indian Lake in Manitoba

South Indian Lake is an Indian settlement located on the southeast shore of Southern Indian Lake in northern Manitoba, Canada, about 130 km (81 mi) north of the city of Thompson by air. It had a population of 981 in 2016, and is the main settlement of the O-Pipon-Na-Piwin Cree Nation, a First Nations band government.

== Access ==
The lake and the settlement are accessed by the South Indian Lake Airport and Manitoba Provincial Road 493 (PR 493). PR 493. a gravel road, begins at Leaf Rapids on the PR 391 (also a gravel road) and runs 219.1 km (136.1 mi) northeast to its terminus at South Indian Lake. The nearest city, Thompson, is 436 km (271 mi) by road.

== History ==
The Hudson's Bay Company established an important fur-trading post at South Indian Lake in 1803.

In the 1960s, the South Indian Lake settlement were self-supporting, having achieved economic independence through fishing and trapping. The average combined household income was $5,000, compared to $500 for most northern First Nations communities, according to studies commissioned by the Manitoba Development Authority. The population was 480 with 76.6% treaty Indians and 21.3% were “non-treaty Indian and Métis."

=== The Churchill River Diversion and the relocation of the South Indian Lake community ===
In 1967, the Manitoba Development Authority received assessment studies related to the inevitable relocation of the South Indian Lake community due to planned flooding caused by Manitoba Hydro's Churchill River Diversion (CRD) which would divert water into the Nelson River at Southern Indian Lake. This would flood the area around the southeast shore of the settlement. The CRD would "increase the water flow to... large generating stations on the lower Nelson River". A May 1967 report by Van Ginkel Associates "assessed the relocation site for the community and included a proposed plan which outlined economic, social, and educational programmes to be integrated along with the physical development of the region". The Van Ginkel Associates report said that "relocation would necessarily negatively disrupt" the way of life of the South Indian Lake settlement. The consultants "were confident that the era of remote northern communities, such as the community of South Indian Lake, was rapidly coming to an end...The communities of native people that exist throughout Manitoba...have no future and … the interest of the native people of the total community will be gravely prejudiced if those resources of money and creative thought are not dedicated to solving the problem of the remote Indian settlement and the Indian reservation."

The CRD raised the water level of Southern Indian Lake by 3 m (9.8 ft), which forced the community of 500 people to relocate. According to a 2015 Manitoba Clean Environment Commission (CECM) report, the Van Ginkel Associates plan was never implemented.
