= Rat River (Burntwood River tributary) =

Watercourse in Manitoba, Canada

Coordinates: 57.13°N 97.94°W

The Rat River is a tributary of the Burntwood River in Manitoba, Canada.

The Rat River forms the north–south part of the Churchill River Diversion.

== See also ==
- Rat River (Red River of the North), a tributary of the Red River of the North
- List of rivers of Manitoba
