= South Indian Lake Airport =

Airport in Manitoba, Canada

- IATA: XSI; ICAO: CZSN

Summary
- Airport type: Public
- Operator: Government of Manitoba
- Location: South Indian Lake, Manitoba
- Time zone: CST (UTC−06:00)
  - Summer (DST): CDT (UTC−05:00)
- Elevation AMSL: 951 ft / 290 m
- Coordinates: 56°47′34″N 098°54′26″W

Map
- Location in Manitoba CZSN (Canada)

Runways
| Direction | Length | | Surface |
| Direction | ft | m | Surface |
|---|---|---|---|
| 18/36 | 3,510 | 1,070 | Crushed rock |

Statistics (2010)
- Aircraft movements: 630
- Source: Canada Flight Supplement; Movements from Statistics Canada

South Indian Lake Airport (IATA: XSI, ICAO: CZSN) is located 2 nautical miles (3.7 km; 2.3 mi) east of South Indian Lake, Manitoba, Canada.

== Airlines and destinations ==
| Airlines | Destinations |
|---|---|
| Perimeter Aviation | Thompson, York Landing |

== See also ==
- List of airports in Manitoba
