= Leaf Rapids =

Town of Leaf Rapids
- Location within Manitoba
- Coordinates: 56°28′0″N 100°00′21″W
- Country: Canada
- Province: Manitoba
- Region: Northern Manitoba
- Incorporated: 1969

Government
  - MLA Thompson: Eric Redhead (NDP)
  - MP Churchill—Keewatinook Aski: Rebecca Chartrand (Liberal)

Area
  - Total: 1,272.87 km^{2} (491.46 sq mi)

Population (2021)
  - Total: 351
- Time zone: UTC-6 (Central (CST))
  - Summer (DST): UTC-5 (Central (CDT))
- Postal code: R0B 1W0
- Area code: 204
- Website: townofleafrapids.ca

Leaf Rapids is a town in northwest Manitoba, Canada. The town was developed using an experimental model that emphasized modern convenience and luxury in a northern environment. The community is located approximately 1,000 km north of Winnipeg along the Churchill River. The original (urban) community of Leaf Rapids is on Manitoba Provincial Road 391, although most of the large official town created later lies east of this community. This town is as large as a typical Rural Municipality in the more southern parts of Manitoba.

An all-weather road connects the community to Thompson, Lynn Lake, and South Indian Lake. Since the establishment of the community, Leaf Rapids has witnessed a number of significant changes directly related to mining operations. Population declines, and degradation to the town's infrastructure have all occurred since the mine's closure in 2002. The community have invested considerable time and effort examining possible transitions.

== History ==
In 1969, Sherritt Gordon Mines discovered a vast copper and zinc ore body at Ruttan Lake. As a result of this substantial discovery, there was an urgent demand for a community to provide support services for the mine and its workers. The first residents of Leaf Rapids arrived in 1971 and the community's infrastructure was completed in the fall of 1976. During this same year, the community's population exceeded 2,000 residents. Leaf Rapids is sometimes described as the "instant town" due to the fast construction time and the large population that gathered during the short time period.

In March 2007, Leaf Rapids became the first municipality in Canada to ban the use of single-use plastic shopping bags.

The Ruttan Mine closed down in June 2002, leading to an immediate impact on Leaf Rapids' economy: businesses such as CIBC and Northern closed their Leaf Rapids locations, and 900 residents indicated that they planned to leave. The state of the town has continued to decline in the years that followed, with a dwindling population (having fallen to 350 in 2021), lack of employment opportunities, high levels of crime, and degrading infrastructure (including roads in need of repair, and having been under a boil-water advisory since 2013). The town is vulnerable to wildfires, while a 2024 Canada Post strike impacted the ability for resources such as medication to be sent to the town.

In 2019. the province of Manitoba dissolved the municipal council because quorum could not be reached after two representatives were removed for not attending meetings and a third resigning. As a result, Leaf Rapids was placed under third party administration, hired and paid for by the province, which has further complicated efforts to manage the town.

During the 2025 wildfires, the town declared a state of emergency on July 7, 2025, and fell under a two month-long evacuation order from July 8 to September 22, 2025 after a fire crossed the Churchill River. The fire destroyed a house and several vacant buildings in the city. Although the evacuation order was lifted, some residents elected to permanently remain in Thompson or Winnipeg instead. The local Co-op store—the only grocery store in the town—has faced mounting debt from Federated Co-operatives, a lack of stock and empty shelves, and the threat of potential closure in June 2026.

== Demographics ==
Historical population
Year	Pop.	±%
1981	2,356	—
1986	1,950	−17.2%
1996	1,504	−22.9%
2001	1,309	−13.0%
2006	539	−58.8%
2011	498	−7.6%
2016	582	+16.9%
2021	351	−39.7%

In the 2021 Census of Population conducted by Statistics Canada, Leaf Rapids had a population of 351 living in 118 of its 266 total private dwellings, a change of −39.7% from its 2016 population of 582. With a land area of 1,237.66 km^{2} (477.86 sq mi), it had a population density of 0.3/km^{2} (0.7/sq mi) in 2021.

== Planning ==
The government of Manitoba decided that the past mistakes in the planning of northern resource communities should not be repeated, and participated directly in the planning of the community. An entirely new approach to building was conceived. In July 1970, the Leaf Rapids Development Corporation Ltd. (a Manitoba provincial crown corporation) was charged with the responsibility of building the Town of Leaf Rapids – 25 kilometres (16 mi) away from Ruttan Lake. The town was constructed with a deep respect for the wilderness that is incorporated into every aspect of the community, from construction to infrastructure to recreation. In June 1971, the construction of Leaf Rapids began, ensuring that much of the natural vegetation would be saved. Even in present-day Leaf Rapids, a permit must be obtained before cutting down any trees within the town limits.

=== Awards ===
Built in a semicircle of residential bays around the Town Centre Complex, Leaf Rapids won the Vincent Massey Award for Urban Excellence in 1975. The Town Centre Complex was built of a material that was intended to turn bright blue as it reacted over time to air pollution; however, due to minimal pollutants in the remote location, the Town Centre Complex remains rust coloured. During the first four years of its life, architects and town planners from across Canada and around the world – some as far away as Japan – visited Leaf Rapids to view its unique design and infrastructure. Over the years, other towns followed suit in building similar facilities.

== Transportation ==
Leaf Rapids is located adjacent to provincial highway 391. Highway 391 connects the communities of Thompson, Lynn Lake, the Nelson House, and South Indian Lake.

Six kilometres north of Leaf Rapids is the Leaf Rapids Airport. As of 2007, there was no regular commercial air service at the airport. A number of small local companies provide charter passenger and cargo services. Calm Air used to fly regular passenger flights from Leaf Rapids to Thompson, however these flights have ceased since the Ruttan Mine closed.

In 2007 the community again made headlines by proposing the use of golf carts for local transport. Golf carts were offered as an incentive to new buyers of homes in the community.

== Education ==
Leaf Rapids is home to the Leaf Rapids Education Centre. The centre provides kindergarten to grade 12 services. The school is part of the Frontier School Division. In 2005/2006, the Leaf Rapids Education Centre had a student population of 163.

== Health care ==
The Leaf Rapids Health Centre is part of the Northern Health Region (NHR). The Health Centre provides a range of services to community residents. The Health Centre is staffed with registered nurses, a lab technologist, and other support staff. The community is also served by an NHR ambulance service.

== Law enforcement ==
The Leaf Rapids Royal Canadian Mounted Police detachment polices Leaf Rapids, South Indian Lake, and Granville Lake. The detachment is made up of a sergeant, one corporal, six constables, and an administrative public service employee.
