= Nelson House, Manitoba =

Human settlement in Manitoba, Canada

Coordinates: 55.827°N 98.852°W

Nelson House (Cree: ᓂᓯᒐᐚᔭᓯᕽ, nisicawâyasihk) is a designated place in northern Manitoba, Canada adjacent to the Nelson House 170 Indian Reserve, which is part of the Nisichawayasihk Cree Nation. It is located approximately 75 km (47 mi) northwest of Thompson. The Hudson's Bay Company operated a fur-trading post in Nelson House from 1800-1827.

== Demographics ==
In the 2021 Census of Population conducted by Statistics Canada, Nelson House had a population of 70 living in 18 of its 20 total private dwellings, a change of -1.4% from its 2016 population of 71. With a land area of 3.43 km^{2} (1.32 sq mi), it had a population density of 20.4/km^{2} (52.9/sq mi) in 2021.
