= Burntwood River =

River in Manitoba, Canada

Coordinates: 56.13°N 96.55°W

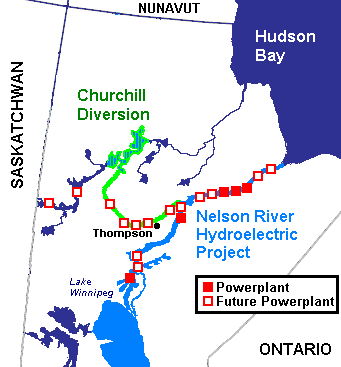
Planned Churchill Diversion. The east-west part of the diversion follows the Burntwood and the north-south part the Rat River .The headwaters of the Burntwood are near Kississing Lake, which is the lake west of Thompson and south of the Churchill.

The Burntwood River is a river in northeast Manitoba, Canada between the Churchill River and the Nelson River, which passes through Thompson, Manitoba. It is over 320 kilometres (200 mi) long and flows mostly east to join the Nelson River at Split Lake, Manitoba.

== History ==
Near its headwaters around Burntwood Lake, the Kississing Portage connects it to the Churchill River. The route was used by lighter Indian canoes to carry the rich Athabasca furs to Hudson Bay or, by going up the Nelson, to the posts on Lake Winnipeg. The route was not much used by voyageurs partly because there was more Pemmican further south. Just south of the Burntwood, the Grass River, which also ends at Split Lake, was a parallel canoe route. In 1790 the Hudson's Bay Company built Lake's House at the mouth of the Burntwood. In 1793 David Thompson (explorer) followed a large part of the Burntwood. In 1825–26 George Simpson (administrator) tried to use the Burntwood as a direct route from York Factory to the Pacific, but the experiment was abandoned. Today it forms part of the Churchill River Diversion. The Wuskwatim Dam and Generating Station west of Thompson were expected to be completed in 2012.

== See also ==
- List of rivers of Manitoba
- Bois-Brûlés
