= Lynn Lake =

Town in Manitoba, Canada

- Town
- Town of Lynn Lake
- Location within Manitoba Location within Canada
- Coordinates: 56°51′06″N 101°02′48″W
- Country: Canada
- Province: Manitoba
- Region: Northern Manitoba

Population (2021)
  - Total: 579
- Time zone: UTC-6 (Central (CST))
  - Summer (DST): UTC-5 (Central (CDT))
- Postal code: R0B 1W0
- Area code: 204
- Website: www.lynnlake.ca

Lynn Lake is a town in the northwest region of Manitoba, Canada, approximately 1,071 kilometres (665 mi) from Winnipeg. The town is the fourth-largest town in Manitoba in terms of land area. It is centred on the original urban community of Lynn Lake. The town was named after Lynn Smith, chief engineer of Sherritt Gordon Mines Ltd. There are many outfitters in the Lynn Lake area, offering services for most wilderness experiences, including sport fishing and bear and moose hunting.

== History ==
What is now Lynn Lake was developed by Sherritt Gordon Mines Ltd and the Manitoba government. It was originally known as Sherridon, Manitoba. It was named after Lynn Smith, then chief engineer of the mining company.

Nickel was discovered at Lynn Lake in the late 1930s, but awaited development until 1952. In 1950 Sherritt Gordon began moving its operations up from Sherridon, 250 km south. The move, which involved 219 buildings (including houses, a school, a bank, stores and churches, as well as mining and milling equipment), was by tractor train and took 4 winters to complete. After a rich vein of copper ore had been nearly depleted in Sherridon, the company sent out prospectors to find another strike. Around 1945, the expeditions were successful when one of the world's largest nickel strikes was found near the soon-to-be-established Lynn Lake. Most of the people of Sherridon moved to Lynn Lake when housing was completed.

Gold mining was once the major industry of the town, with the mine was shut down in the late 20th century. Following the closure of the mine in the late 1990s, the town saw a decline of its population from over 3,500 to 675 people by 2011. With so many having left the town, numerous abandoned homes were left in the community which forced the town to either burn or tear the buildings down.

The town was heavily affected by the 2025 Canadian wildfires, evacuation orders were put in place from May 27 to June 20, then again July 4 until August 22. During those times the town was mostly empty except for firefighting staff and volunteers that created fire breaks, maintained infrastructure and setup sprinklers to protect the entire town from being destroyed. Some outlying properties were lost, and damage and cleanup costs were estimated to be $10 million. Afterwards the lack of electrical services in town due to damage on its long and isolated Manitoba Hydro feed meant that residents were not able to return until mid-September.

== Demographics ==
Population Growth
| Year | Pop. | ±% |
|---|---|---|
| 1996 | 1038 | — |
| 2001 | 699 | — |
| 2006 | 714 | +2.1% |
| 2011 | 674 | −5.6% |
| 2016 | 494 | −26.7% |
| 2021 | 579 | +17.2% |

In the 2021 Census of Population conducted by Statistics Canada, Lynn Lake had a population of 579 living in 186 of its 293 total private dwellings, a change of 17.2% from its 2016 population of 494. With a land area of 867.53 km^{2} (334.96 sq mi), it had a population density of 0.7/km^{2} (1.7/sq mi) in 2021.

Statistics Canada amended the 2011 census results to a population of 674 living in 246 of its 386 total dwellings, a −5.6% change from 2006. With a land area of 910.23 km^{2} (351.44 sq mi), it had a population density of 0.7405/km^{2} (1.9178/sq mi) in 2011.

In 2001, the population of Lynn Lake was 699, a −32.7% change from its 1996 population of 1,038.

== Attractions ==
Burge Lake Provincial Park and Zed Lake Provincial Park are nearby.

Lynn Lake Mining Museum

Share it on Sherritt - A community-run initiative for arts and culture happens a couple times a year during the summer with open mic events and various other community events, including a public space with a new grandstand built by the school in 2023.

== Transportation ==
The town is served by Lynn Lake Airport and Manitoba Provincial Road 391. There is a functional rail line between Lynn Lake and The Pas. The rail line is owned by Keewatin Railway and is inactive between Pukatawagan and Lynn Lake.

== Notable people ==
Canadian musician, writer, and Officer in the Order of Canada Tom Cochrane was born in Lynn Lake and lived there until he was four years old. On October 31, 2016, he announced a return to Lynn Lake for a live performance, scheduled for August 20, 2017. The announcement was made from the Manitoba Legislature as part of a ceremony that announced the renaming of Manitoba Provincial Road 391 from Thompson, MB, to Lynn Lake as the "Life Is A Highway", in commemoration of the 25th anniversary of Cochrane's best-selling album Mad Mad World.

Lynn Johnston, award-winning cartoonist and creator of the comic strip For Better or For Worse, also lived for a number of years in Lynn Lake, where she began her career.

== Climate ==
Lynn Lake experiences a subarctic climate (Köppen Dfc), with long, severely cold winters and short, mild to warm, rainy summers.

Climate data for Lynn Lake (1981-2010)
| Month | Jan | Feb | Mar | Apr | May | Jun | Jul | Aug | Sep | Oct | Nov | Dec | Year |
|---|---|---|---|---|---|---|---|---|---|---|---|---|---|
| Record high °C (°F) | 7.7 (45.9) | 7.5 (45.5) | 12.4 (54.3) | 27.4 (81.3) | 31.6 (88.9) | 35.2 (95.4) | 33.9 (93.0) | 35.3 (95.5) | 29.3 (84.7) | 24.0 (75.2) | 11.4 (52.5) | 5.6 (42.1) | 35.3 (95.5) |
| Mean daily maximum °C (°F) | −19.3 (−2.7) | −14.4 (6.1) | −6.2 (20.8) | 3.2 (37.8) | 11.9 (53.4) | 19.1 (66.4) | 22.1 (71.8) | 20.3 (68.5) | 12.4 (54.3) | 3.1 (37.6) | −8.4 (16.9) | −16.7 (1.9) | 2.3 (36.1) |
| Daily mean °C (°F) | −24.3 (−11.7) | −20.3 (−4.5) | −13.0 (8.6) | −3.1 (26.4) | 5.6 (42.1) | 12.9 (55.2) | 16.2 (61.2) | 14.7 (58.5) | 7.7 (45.9) | −0.6 (30.9) | −12.5 (9.5) | −21.4 (−6.5) | −3.2 (26.2) |
| Mean daily minimum °C (°F) | −29.3 (−20.7) | −26.1 (−15.0) | −19.8 (−3.6) | −9.4 (15.1) | −0.8 (30.6) | 6.6 (43.9) | 10.3 (50.5) | 9.0 (48.2) | 3.0 (37.4) | −4.2 (24.4) | −16.5 (2.3) | −26.0 (−14.8) | −8.6 (16.5) |
| Record low °C (°F) | −46.7 (−52.1) | −46.1 (−51.0) | −45 (−49) | −33 (−27) | −15.5 (4.1) | −5.6 (21.9) | 0.8 (33.4) | −2.8 (27.0) | −10.7 (12.7) | −28.9 (−20.0) | −37.7 (−35.9) | −47.1 (−52.8) | −47.1 (−52.8) |
| Average precipitation mm (inches) | 20.3 (0.80) | 16.3 (0.64) | 19.8 (0.78) | 24.1 (0.95) | 37.3 (1.47) | 61.8 (2.43) | 85.4 (3.36) | 68.8 (2.71) | 61.0 (2.40) | 37.6 (1.48) | 26.8 (1.06) | 18.8 (0.74) | 477.9 (18.81) |
| Average snowfall cm (inches) | 27.6 (10.9) | 23.5 (9.3) | 24.6 (9.7) | 23.9 (9.4) | 10.4 (4.1) | 1.3 (0.5) | 0.1 (0.0) | 0.1 (0.0) | 3.5 (1.4) | 31.3 (12.3) | 36.0 (14.2) | 26.0 (10.2) | 208.1 (81.9) |
Source: Environment Canada

== Local media ==
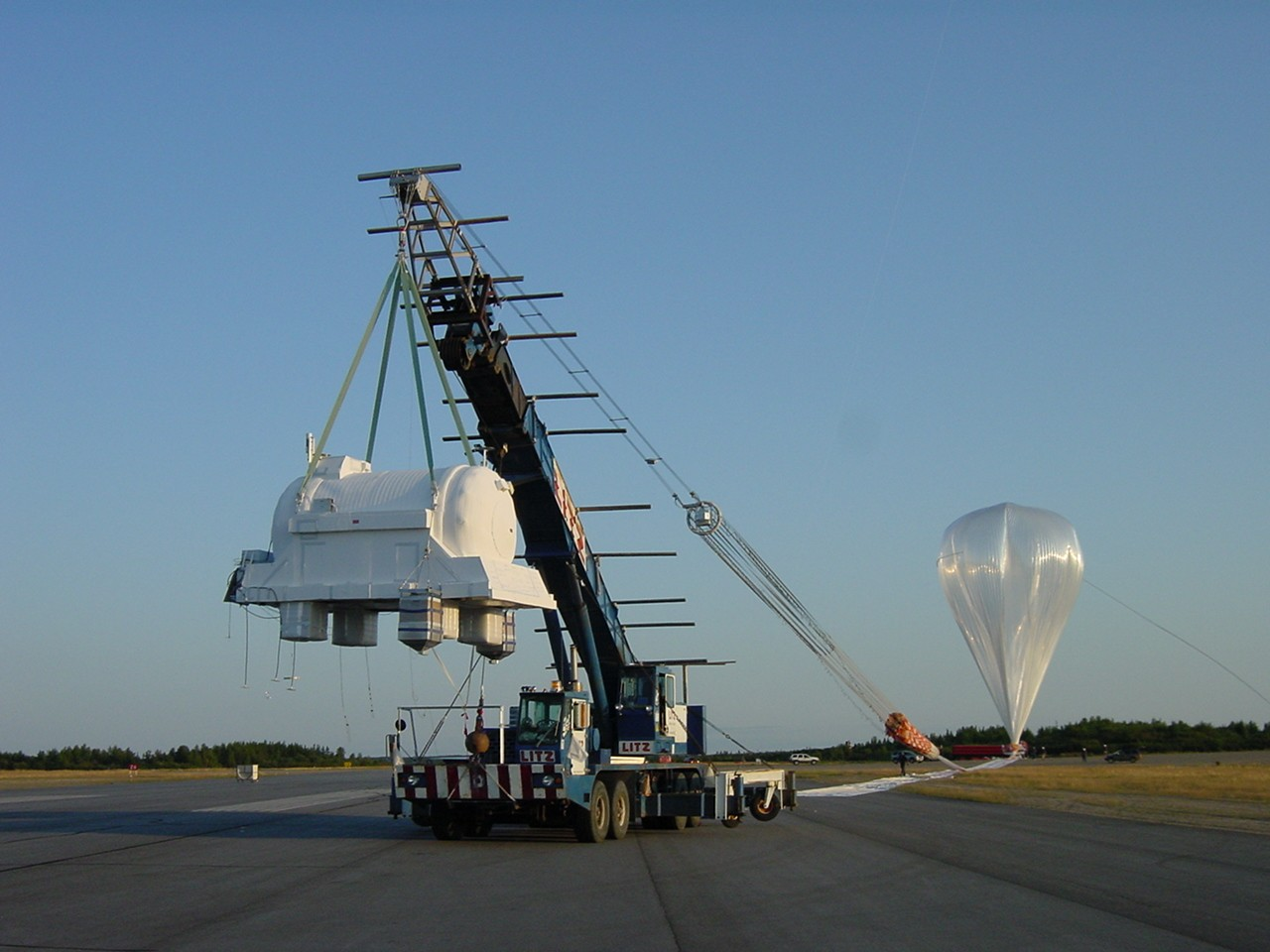
NASA's "Balloon-borne Experiment with a Superconducting Spectrometer" lifting off near Lynn Lake, August 7, 2002

=== Television ===
CBTA began operation in September 1966 on channel 8. CBTA was a Frontier Coverage Package station with program broadcast on a one-week delay. The station operated 4 hours per day from 6pm to 10pm, 7 days a week. CBTA's antenna, transmitter and video equipment were located at the Lynn Lake post office. In early 1969 the province-wide microwave system replaced the video tape recordings. CBTA became part of the CBC network, rebroadcasting programming from CBW TV in Winnipeg. The transmitter was later moved to the MTS site. CBTA was managed and operated by Ken Crowston from September 1966 until shortly after the station connected to live CBC network. Lynn Lake has enjoyed live television since then.

- CBWRT Channel 8 (CBC)

=== Print ===
The Town of Lynn Lake used to publish Lynn Lake Life, a local newsletter, each month. It was available at many local locations in paper format and simultaneously available on-line. Monthly publication was suspended in July 2013 when the editor left the community.

in the 1960s there was a community paper called the lyre that was then replaced by the northern breez in the 70's ceased publication around 1989.
