= List of fatal dog attacks in Canada =

Fatal dog attacks in Canada are rare: a 2008 study found that one to two deaths per year in Canada are attributable to dog attacks, however other systematic data is lacking compared to the wider variety of studies conducted by researchers in the United States. In the lists below, the attribution of the dog type or breed is assigned by the sources.

== Fatalities before 2000 ==
=== Prior to 1990 ===
Date	Location	Dog type (Number)	Victim's name	Victim's age	Circumstances
June 21, 1814	St-Foy Parish, Lower Canada	Unknown (1)	Charles Gigueres	9 years	Bitten by a rabid dog on the face and died. The dog belonged to a neighbor and "relation of the family". It came to Charles' father's home - as it often did - and approached Charles and two other children playing, and when Charles caressed him, the dog bit him on the right lower jaw. The wound healed slowly in about two or three weeks, and the child seemed in good health until he complained of an earache on the right side where he had been bitten. He got worse, eventually exhibiting the usual symptoms of rabies. The doctor tried to use "copious bleeding, mercural applications, etc.", with no hopes of success. Authorities ordered to have dogs and other dangerous domestic animals that were bitten to be destroyed.
November 29, 1820	Lower Canada	Unknown (1)	Son of Coad Lins	9 years	Died from "hydrophobia" after being bitten by a dog.
June 1836	Faubourg Saint-Louis, Lower Canada	Unknown (1)	Son of Mr. Burns	7 years	He was bitten by a dog belonging to a butcher, who, in total, had 11 dogs. The child died on the 3rd July of the same year. The dog was rabid.
February 14–15, 1837	Lower Canada	Unknown (1)	Josephte Martineau	44 years	Martineau and her husband were bitten by their own dog, which until then had not shown any symptoms of rabies. The doctor cut with no delay the part of her husband's hand that had been bitten, but Martineau could not agree to have her leg amputated.
September 14, 1838	Montreal, Lower Canada	Unknown (1)	Daughter of Mr. Jamieson	7 years	The family dog attacked Mr Jamieson's daughter - and it was thought to have rabies. She was seriously wounded, with five distinct bites in the face, including a half-inch wide one that removed her eye. Doctors were called, but were not convinced there were rabies symptoms. Le Canadien newspaper at first reported that the child recovered thanks to a cure given by Henry Hughes, a soldier, having no difficulty drinking and not having any external symptoms. According to the newspaper Le Populaire, it was because the soldier's remedy was not applicated in time, with the latter's authority being eclipsed by the doctors', that the daughter of Mr. Jamieson died, on October 11, 1838. The dog had bitten other animals. Magistrates emitted an order that dog owners should keep them withdrawn or muzzled.
c. 1840	Deschambault, Lower Canada	Unknown (1)	Unknown	Young	A young girl was bitten by a rabid dog, and eventually died rabies.
August 7, 1856	King, Canada West	Unknown (1)	William Hughes	Adult	Hughes, an Englishman having lived in Canada for 20 years, was bitten by his own dog, while in the harvest field, on his arm, face, and other parts of his body. The dog was instantly destroyed and medical help was called. He at first seemed to have recovered. While drinking his tea, he suddenly felt he could not drink, as if he had the cold. He grew gradually worse, and doctors attended to him, with no success. At one point, he started barking and making noises as a dog would. He was tied down by nearby as he might have injured himself and others. He died on September 3. He already had done his will before getting ill, after getting bitten. The dog had also bitten two pigs, which had gotten rabies, with one attacking the owner's wife's, but causing no injury. A neighbor's cow died mad shortly before, and shortly after, a sheep from this same neighbor went rabid.
1863	Québec, Canada East	Unknown (At least two)	William Price	+-74 years	Attacked by his neighbors' dogs while having a walk in his neighborhood. Never fully recovered from the wounds, dying in 1867, apparently as a result of the attack.
c. 1865	Newfoundland	Unknown (Unknown)	Unknown	Young	A little girl was killed, with the dogs eating most of her face. The island's dogs were known to attack horses, cows, other dogs and people out of hunger.
December 2, 1866	Lanark Township, Canada West	Unknown (1)	Son of Mr. Ballintine	Young	Mr Ballintine's son was bitten in the morning by a mad dog. He had 23 wounds on his left arm, 8 on his right hand. The boy initially did not show serious symptoms. A remedy was given, but ultimately did not work. His state gradually worsened, and he died.
April 16, 1869	Québec	Unknown (1)	Unknown	Unknown	Passersby noticed a dog eating a piece of meat. Upon closer inspection, they noticed the dog was eating the body of a young child.
c. 1876	Nova Scotia	Unknown (1)	Unknown	Adult	A Presbyterian minister was bitten by a rabid dog and died of the disease six years later, in 1882.
March 17, 1884	Saint-Sauveur, Quebec	Newfoundland dog (2)	Madelène Jobin	57 years	Jobin was attacked by two large Newfoundland dogs as she was coming back from her home. She was bitten by the dogs, but managed to escape to her home. She at first seemed to be recovering, but died not much later.
December 5, 1888	Halifax, Nova Scotia	Unknown (1)	Unknown	Newly born	The body of a newly born child was found alongside a dog, in the process of eating it.
November, 1891	Maloney Township, (near or at) Gatineau, Québec	Unknown (1)	Son of William Doley	14 years	William Doley's son was bitten by a rabid dog and immediately had rabies symptoms, convulsed, and died.
c. 1896	Newfoundland	Unknown (At least 2)	Unknown	14 years	An Inuk ("Eskimo") boy was attacked by dogs as he brought a seal he had hunted back to his home. The dogs ate the seal and the boy.
1897	Tête-à-la-Baleine, Québec	Unknown (4)	Murphy	13 years	She was sent to her uncle's nearby house by her parents. She was attacked by dogs, and was found a few hours after the attack, with parts of her head and throat missing. Four dogs were resting near her, apparently waiting for her body to cool, as they did with reindeers.
November 6, 1897	Battle Harbor, Labrador	Unknown (Unknown)	Unknown	13 years	A 13-year-old girl was eaten by dogs.
March 25, 1898	Forteau, Labrador	Unknown (Unknown)	Unknown man Unknown man	Adult	Two men were eaten by dogs.
c. 1901	Quebec	Unknown (7)	Marie Adeline Pratt	Adult	While her husband was initially suspected of murdering Pratt, it was later concluded that her wounds were caused by her dogs, which had bitten her while she was extremely drunk ("ivre-mort"), and that she had died from the wounds or the resulting "fright". She did not feed her dogs while drunk, and medical experts believed the dogs' hunger led to the attack.
c. 1905	Okak, Labrador	Canadian Eskimo Dogs (Unknown)	Unknown woman Unknown child	Unknown	A woman and her child were killed by dogs.
c. 1906	Indian Harbor, Labrador	Sled dogs (9)	Robert Crumby	25 years	Crumby was out to obtain a load of firewood supplies driving a sled, when his dogs turned on him and killed him. He was found by a team that departed 20 minutes after him, already dead and being eaten by his dogs. The dogs were especially fierce, two of them having to be fought off with axes. They were all shot. The pack was known to be "bad", and usually wasn't used by a single man
c. 1909	Notre-Dame du Sacré-Coeur, Québec	Unknown (1)	Parent	72 years	Parent was attacked in a field by a dog and ended up dying from the wounds it inflicted.
1910	Dundas, Ontario	Unknown (1)	Taylor	14 years	The victim was bitten on the lips by a dog. He was brought to the Hamilton hospital, frothing and barking like a dog, in apparent pain. The victim died in 1910, at the hospital in Hamilton. According to medical experts, it was the first case of rabies in Ontario. The dog had not shown symptoms of rabies. The victim kicked the dog with such strength that it died two days later.
December 8, 1912	St. Thomas, Ontario	Unknown (1)	Alexandra Dean or May Kenn	4 years	She attempted to stroke a stray dog, which bit her on the cheek, and took ill. She was thought to have died of rabies, but did not exhibit some symptoms. It was the first death from hydrophobia in St. Thomas. The police did not find the dog, but the police did destroy similar-looking dogs.
1918	Ontario	Bulldog (1)	David Strathearn	Adult	Strathearn was bitten by his pet bulldog, which was shot on the spot. He thought nothing of it, but after some time, he became ill, eventually dying of rabies on 12 August 1918, a few weeks after the attack.
1919-1920	Unknown	Unknown (1)	J. F. Egan	24 years	Egan, a trapper, was checking his traps when he lost consciousness. His dog then ate his head.
November 1925	Bonne Bay or Bartlett's Harbour, Newfoundland	Unknown (At least two)	Charles Hines (or Hinds)	4 or 6 years	Hinds was attacked by dogs belonging to his parents near the house's door. The dogs attacked the men who went to rescue the child. Only bones and the head of Hines were found.
January 7, 1929	Kirkland Lake, Ontario	Collies (2)	Germaine Lafontaine	6 years	Lafontaine went out to play in the snow at her family's home, around two miles from Kirkland Lake. Bougie, whose family shared home with Lafontaine's, coming back from Kirkland Lake in a sled, found her a few hours later, unconscious, scalped and her body torn. She was brought to the home and healers were called, but her injuries were so extensive that all attempts were fruitless. She died around two hours later, without having gained back consciousness. Her parents, who were in the house at the time, had not heard any scream. The two dogs were destroyed.
September 22, 1929	Wendover, Ontario	Unknown (1)	Philippe Villeneuve	9 years	Villeneuve was bitten near his home by a rabid dog. He was bitten in seven places, including the head, wrist and face. He was transported to an Ottawa hospital on Water Road, where he died on October 14 of the same year. According to medical experts, a bite in the victim's inferior lip caused the death by reaching the victim's head before the anti-rabies treatment. A jury assembled in the town hall to investigate Villeneuve's death concluded that the federal government should have taken more measures to protect humans after the first case of rabies was found in the county. It recommended the usage of vaccine for animals against rabies, and to quarantine the neighboring counties. The jury also recommended that all expenses incurred by the victim's father be paid by the federal government. It was apparently the first such death by rabies in Ontario, despite the victim quickly being treated for rabies.
11 or 12 July 1931	Saint-Timothée, Québec	Unknown (1)	Unknown	5 months	The child's parents, Mr. and Mme. Davidson, left the child alone with the family's trusted dog. The house's exterior door was locked, but the doors inside were not, leaving the dog able to move. When the parents came back, they found the child's mangled corpse, with the dog in the corner of the room, with a bloodied mouth. The dog was shot on the spot with a revolver.
1933	Greece's Point, Québec	Unknown (1)	Octave Dupuis	9 years	Dupuis was bitten by a stray dog. He was first treated at a private clinic in Hawkesbury, and went home, seemingly fine. He died of rabies a few weeks after the attack, around 7 July 1933.
c. 1933	Manitoba (?)	Sled dogs (At least two)	Jean Boulanger	+-7 years at attack 9 years at death	Boulanger was attacked, trampled and bitten by sled dogs. He never fully recovered from the dog bites and ended up contracting tuberculosis. He was treated at the Saint-Boniface hospital and underwent three operations. He died on March 2, 1935, two years after the attack, as a result of the latter.
November 30 or December 1, 1936	Mutton Bay (near Gros-Mécatina), Quebec	Canadian Eskimo Dogs (9)	Jackie Payne	6 years	Payne was attacked by dogs at the far north port as he walked home from school. He soon died at the Harrington Harbour hospital. It is unknown if the dogs were euthanized.
c. 1937	Hay River, Northwest Territories	Unknown (6)	Unknown	6 years	Pilot Arthur Rankin reported that a six-year-old child was eaten alive by six dogs. The child's name is unknown. The dogs were killed.
October or November 1941	Chatham, Ontario	St-Bernards (6)	Ward Stanworth	5 years	The dogs attacked Stanworth in their kennel. The dogs were destroyed on the order of the municipal authorities.
January 30, 1950	Flin Flon, Manitoba	Husky (2)	Garry Lawrence Bielby	6 years	Bielby was attacked by a resident's dogs while he collected firewood from his backyard. He was found semi-conscious by a neighbour, but died minutes after arriving at a hospital. The dogs were euthanized by their owner after the attack. Several residents complained that they bit children. The dogs were untethered.
May 26, 1954	Grand Rapids, Manitoba	Sled dog	Marleen Ruby McDay	3 years	McDay was bitten to death by a dog, which was euthanized shortly after.
July 14, 1954	La Tabatière, Québec	Canadian Eskimo Dogs (5)	Shirley Gallichant	11 years	Five of the eighteen dogs kept by the family attacked the girl.
1955	Great Whale River (modern Kuujjuarapik), Kativik, Québec	Unknown (at least two)	Pat Shackleton	5 years	She was killed by dogs at about 100 yards away from her parents' home. One of three fatal dog attacks in the region which led to a detective being sent to destroy unleashed dogs.
c. 1955	Northern Québec	Unknown	Unknown	Unknown	One of three fatal dog attacks in the region which led to a detective being sent to destroy unleashed dogs. The details were not known to detective Nick Anderson for a third case, as the report was unavailable.
August 17, 1955	Bracebridge, Ontario	Farm dogs (14)	Wayne Baker	6 years	Baker was trying to protect his pet dog, Mickey, from other dogs. He was found by Vera MacDonald, who owned the dogs and property. Despite receiving several blood transfusions, Baker died while being transferred from a local hospital to the Hospital for Sick Children in Toronto. MacDonald's dogs were presumably euthanized.
1956	Baie-James, Québec	Unknown (at least 2)	Unknown	A few days old	A mother gave her newly born child to her dogs to eat. Neighbors reportedly found pieces of clothes, skin and blood around the mother's home.
December 26, 1958	Northern Québec	Unknown (at least two)	Diane Suppa	3 years	One of three fatal dog attacks in the region which led to a detective being sent to destroy unleashed dogs.
December 31, 1961	Auden (part of Unorganized Thunder Bay District), Ontario	Pack of stray husky crosses (20)	Deborah Joy (or June) Richardson	6 years	Richardson's father dropped her off at the community hall to attend Sunday school, but she left after learning that classes were cancelled for a New Year's Eve party. She was attacked by several dogs from Onbabika, a nearby First Nations village, while walking home. Richardson died from blood loss and shock. There were around 800 visible bite marks on her body. The dogs may have picked up the scent of her German Shepherd that frequently fought stray dogs. At least nine of them were euthanized.
c. January 30, 1963	East coast of Cumberland Peninsula, Nunavut	Sled dogs (Unknown number)	Unnamed adult male	Unknown	Four travelling Inuit men were drifting out to sea after falling asleep on ice. Two of them drowned and another one was attacked by their sled dogs. The lone survivor, 31-year-old John Asee, was found on February 1, 1963. He was spotted by a Royal Canadian Mounted Police airplane around 300 miles north of Iqaluit and transported to the Montreal General Hospital for limb amputations. The outcome of the dogs is unknown.
November 17, 1963	Kawartha Lakes, Ontario	Collie	Ellen DeJersey	52 years	DeJersey's dog severed her jugular vein while she suffered from a seizure in her kitchen. Her husband said that she and the dog were fond of each other. The dog was promptly euthanized.
January 4, 1964	Fort Chipewyan, Alberta	German Shepherd and Husky cross sled dogs (5)	Eugene Tuccaro	12 years	Tuccaro was exercising the dogs with fifteen-year-old Lorne Yanik. The dogs weighed around 36 kg (80 lb) each and began mauling Tucarro after he fell down. Yanik called a Royal Canadian Mounted Police constable to the scene, who had to shoot all five dogs before retrieving Tuccaro's "badly torn" body. Tuccaro suffered extreme head injuries and blood loss. Yanik was uninjured.
August 9, 1964	Beauport Lake, Québec	Siberian Husky or Canadian Eskimo Dog	Léon Sansfaçon Jr	3 years	The 68 kg (150 lb) dog from his father's kennel attacked Sansfaçon, apparently because it smelled the chocolate the toddler had just eaten. Two carotid arteries were ruptured and an ear was torn. There were no witness to the attack. The dog until then was good-natured toward children, and Léon Sansfaçon Jr was used to stroking the dog. The dog was shot by its owner on August 10.
September 19, 1964	Fort McMurray, Alberta	Sled dogs (4)	Richard Dean Scott	3 years	Scott wandered into an open field where Joe Kreutzer kept his dogs tethered. He heard Scott cries and released him from the dogs, but was too late to save Scott. Kreutzer euthanized his dogs when ordered to by police. Scott's sister was born the day after his death.
February 11, 1966	Island Lake, Manitoba	Unknown (4)	Sandra Lorraine Mason	5 years	Mason was mauled by four loose dogs. It is unknown if they were euthanized.
May 28, 1966	Dunrobin, Ontario	Golden Retriever	Angela Monaghan	20 months	Monaghan was playing with her older siblings in a sandpit, when the family dog bit the back of her neck. She suffered a dislocated neck and likely died instantly. The dog was euthanized for a rabies test.
April 19, 1968	Renfrew, Ontario	Unknown	Steven Joseph Sirosky	6 or 7 years	Sirosky approached a tethered dog in somebody's backyard while he walked home from school with two friends. He died in a hospital later that day. It is unknown if the dog was euthanized.
March 14, 1971	Fort McPherson, Northwest Territories	Sled dogs (Unknown number)	Suzzanah Wootten	5 years	Wootten, several other children, and an adult were walking along a sled dog trail that was in use. Everyone managed to get out of the way except for her. She was attacked by the dogs until they were beaten off with an axe, presumably killing them.
March 4, 1974	Split Lake, Manitoba	Sled dogs (2)	Roy Howard Beardy	5 years	Beardy was attacked by dogs while playing near the lakeshore with other children at around 4:30 P.M. He died approximately an hour later. Both dogs were euthanized by the Royal Canadian Mounted Police.
August 7, 1974	Taloyoak, Nunavut	Sled dog	Larry Qurruo	3 years	Qurruo, an Inuk, was mauled by a dog that was tethered to a peg. It is unknown if the dog was euthanized.
January 16, 1975	La Ronge, Saskatchewan	Pack of stray dogs (10)	Sean Douglas McNeil	3 years	McNeil was mauled by dogs while crossing the street to a neighbour's residence at about 9:30 A.M., around 150 yards away from McNeil's home. He was dead by the time his mother attempted to rescue him. All of the dogs were euthanized by the Royal Canadian Mounted Police.
January 1975	Unknown	German Shepherd	Unknown	Adult	The police dog Axel attacked a bank robber who was about to attack its owner, agent Robert Martin. In the struggle between the two, the robber accidentally shot and mortally wounded himself.
February 4, 1976	Cumberland, Ontario	Great Dane, Irish wolfhound	Beverley Jean Buchanan	20 years	It seems she was attacked by her two dogs, who apparently were overexcited due to the snowstorm, eventually dying of exposure around 30 m (100 ft) away from her house.
November 9, 1976	Moosonee, Ontario	Unknown (3 or 4)	Louisa Ann Sackenay	46 years	Sackenay fell asleep on a snowbank after leaving a party, where she was attacked by dogs that were eventually driven away by a passerby. She died in the local clinic from shock and exposure.
September 20, 1977	Mayo, Yukon	Sled dog	David Shane Sembsmoen-Moses	3 years	Sembsmoen-Moses was found deceased in a resident's dog kennel at around 11:25 A.M., approximately 24 hours after he was reported missing. He likely died between midnight and 9:00 A.M. The mauling was not extensive nor had his corpse been devoured. One dog was euthanized.
March 27, 1978	Tsiigehtchic, Northwest Territories	Husky x wolf crossed sled dogs (5)	Bella Nidipchie	37 years	Nidipchie, a Gwichʼin mother of five, began a 10-kilometer sled dog race at around 2:00 P.M. She was found three kilometers from the start by another participant, who departed four minutes after her. The attack may have begun after one of her dogs escaped from its harness. Nidipchie died from blood loss and the dogs were euthanized by the Royal Canadian Mounted Police.
June 5, 1979	Newfoundland and Labrador	Unknown (2)	Unnamed male child	5 years	A child was attacked by loose dogs. It is unknown if the dogs were euthanized.
July 9, 1979	Disraeli, Quebec	Husky x Alaskan Malamute	Patrick Cadorette	3 months	Cadorette, who was alone in his carriage outside, was bitten in the neck and face by a neighbour's loose dog. He died en route to the Centre hospitalier universitaire de Sherbrooke. The dog, named Manouk, was destroyed.
August 1, 1979	Niagara Falls, Ontario	Mongrels (2), German Shepherd and Labrador Retriever crosses (5)	Kosta Apostolos	9 years	Apostolos was mauled by five of his family's watchdogs and two of his neighbour's dogs. He was dragged for about 25 m (82 ft), bitten over 100 times, and had his chest ripped open. Apostolos died thirty minutes later in a hospital. A deceased puppy was found at the attack scene, which Apostolos may have tried to rescue from the other dogs. All of the dogs were euthanized, the largest dog weighing 34 kg (75 lb).
Circa 1980	Winnipeg, Manitoba	Husky sled dogs (4)	Unnamed male child	3 years	A child was attacked by dogs after he climbed under a fence. It is unknown if the dogs were euthanized.
March 22, 1983	North of Barrhead, Alberta	Border Collie and mongrel German Shepherd	Nolton Nanninga	3 years	At around 3:00 P.M, Nanninga was attacked by two dogs on a country road less than a kilometer from his home. He was dragged for six meters before being mauled in a field. Nanninga's grandmother found him approximately an hour later. He died from blood loss and hypothermia in the University of Alberta Hospital at around 8:00 P.M. Both dogs were euthanized.
January 23, 1984	Davis Inlet, Newfoundland and Labrador	Stray dogs	Zelda Tastine	3 years	Tastine was found deceased outside of her residence. It is unknown if the dogs were euthanized.
April 8, 1987	Cherryville, British Columbia	German Shepherd x Coyote cross	Dawn April Witowski	5 years	Witowski was attacked by her grandparents' tethered dog, ten-year-old Ben, at around 4:30 P.M. Her grandfather found her five meters away from Ben, where she was lying face down. Ben was promptly euthanized by Witowski's grandfather. Witowski died from blood loss due to a torn carotid artery, but also suffered lacerations to her scalp, forehead, upper chest, and left hand. Ben would bark at strangers, but never acted violent towards Witowski.
May 31, 1988	Stoneham-et-Tewkesbury, Quebec	German Shepherd	Francis Tremblay-Juneau	17 months	Tremblay-Juneau was bitten on the head and neck by a neighbour's watch dog after he wandered into a nearby yard. The dog, who guarded an auto body shop, had been tethered for three years and had not eaten for 24 hours. Tremblay-Juneau was scalped and had his jugular vein severed. He died from blood loss after undergoing surgery. The dog was euthanized and tested negative for rabies.
October 10, 1988	Girardville, Quebec	Alaskan Malamute sled dog	Mathieu D'Amboise	4 years	D'Amboise was alone in the garage when he was bitten in the neck by his family's six-year-old female breeding dog. She had no history of aggression. Emergency medical technicians could not revive D'Amboise and he was dead on arrival at a nearby hospital. The dog recently gave birth to her third litter of puppies within fourteen months. She was tethered without being able to move from her puppies, suffered from mastitis, and became emaciated from being fed only once a day. The dog, her three puppies, and the family's male dog were all euthanized.
March 31, 1989	La Salette (within Norfolk County), Ontario	Dobermann, Rottweiler	Michael Purtill	4 years	Purtill was at a campground with his father, who was working on a trailer with a friend. He was attacked by the friend's dogs after leaving for the bathroom. Purtill weighed 20 kg (44 lb), the Dobermann weighed at least 27 kg (60 lb), and the Rottweiler weighed nearly 45 kg (100 lb). Nobody witnessed the attack. Purtill was not breathing when his father found him. He died from blood loss due to a severed artery in his left arm. Both dogs were euthanized for rabies tests.
May 17, 1989	St. Thomas, Ontario	Dobermann	Donna Sue Miller	46 years	Miller was mauled by her three dogs in her residence. The dogs were removed from the residence, but it is unknown if they were euthanized.

=== Fatalities in 1990-1999 ===
Date	Location	Dog type (Number)	Victim's name	Victim's age	Circumstances
April 26, 1990	Caledon, Ontario	Chow Chow	Katherine Koltai	<1 month	Koltai was attacked by the family dog, 10-year-old Rufus, at around 7:30 A.M. He overturned her bassinet and bit her head, leaving teeth marks. Her parents were in another room during the attack. Koltai died in a Toronto area hospital that she was airlifted to. Rufus, who may have mauled Koltai out of jealousy, was euthanized.
July 28, 1993	Pond Inlet, Nunavut	Sled dogs (8)	Rita Angmarlik	8 years	Angmarlik was attacked by tethered dogs when she tried to feed them a bone. Her sister ran home to inform their father of the incident, who pulled Rita from the dogs and took her to the community health centre. She died a few minutes later. The dogs were euthanized.
December 30, 1993	Fort Chipewyan, Alberta	Sled dogs (5)	Michelle Dawn Whitehead	11 years	Whitehead, who was walking home from a friend's house, was mauled by dogs on an isolated road at around 4:45 P.M. and died two hours later. She may have been trying to stop them from fighting. All of the dogs were euthanized. They were well-fed, did not have a history of being hostile, and were typically tied up on their owner's property. In 1989, Whitehead was attacked by a Rottweiler in Edmonton. She was trying to retrieve an item from a neighbour's yard.
September 22, 1994	Mississippi Mills, Ontario	Maremmano-Abruzzese Sheepdog	Jennifer Ainslie Needham	17 months	At around 5:30 P.M., Needham was bitten in the face and on the back of the head by the family's male dog, Zingaro. She may have gotten between Zingaro and the family's female dog, who was in heat. Needham suffered an air embolism, lost consciousness on the way to the Almonte General Hospital, went into cardiac arrest, and died from blood loss at around 7:15 P.M. A neighbour claimed that several residents were afraid of the Needhams' dogs to the point where they would not go near their residence, but another neighbour said that her children frequently hung around the dogs and did not believe they were dangerous. It is unknown if Zingaro, who weighed 48 kg (105 lb), was euthanized.
April 1995	Alexis Indian reserve, Alberta	Alaskan Malamute (1)	Nathan McDermott	3 years	He was mauled and taken to the Stony Plain Hospital, where he was pronounced dead. The autopsy revealed he died of multiple dog bites.
August 15, 1995	Toronto, Ontario	American Staffordshire Terriers (2)	Taun Joseph Peters	22 or 23 years	An intoxicated Peters began taunting his roommate's dogs, Apollo and Rage, which led to them grabbing Peters' arm and pulling him down. He suffered extensive injuries to his head, neck, and throat. 46-year-old Billy Weaver, Peters' roommate, was charged with criminal negligence a day later, but charges were dropped as he was not home when the attack occurred. The dogs were euthanized against Weaver's request. Two months prior, Peters was hospitalized for twelve days after the same dogs attacked him.
December 14, 1995	Kinistino, Saskatchewan	German Shepherds (2)	Lang Forsyth	6 years	Forsyth was attacked by his uncle's two unneutered dogs, which he was playing with alone. He was announced dead on arrival at the Melfort Union Hospital. Forsyth had extensive wounds to his head and neck. Both dogs were euthanized.
June 18, 1996	Cross Lake First Nation, Manitoba	Pack of stray dogs (4)	Desmond McKay	3 years	Over 100 stray dogs were euthanized in response to McKay's death.
June 27, 1997	Saint-Tite-des-Caps, Quebec	Siberian Husky sled dogs (2)	Dariane Blouin	5 or 6 years	Blouin was mauled by two of her father's dogs. One was loose and dragged her to another dog, which was tethered. She was pronounced dead on arrival at a local hospital. The dogs had a history of killing rabbits, but her father did not believe they would harm the child. Blouin's father had purchased the dogs several months prior for breeding purposes, but he had no experience. One dog was euthanized by the Society for the Prevention of Cruelty to Animals and Blouin's father euthanized his several remaining dogs. He was breeding them for sale.
June 1997	Kingston, Ontario	Pit bull	Sharon Reynolds	7 years	In 1997, seven-year-old Sharon Reynolds was discovered in the basement of her home with 82 "stab wounds." Her mother, Louise Reynolds, was charged with second degree murder, accused of killing her child with scissors. There was dog excrement by the child, the dog was "covered in ketchup," a witness stated there was blood on the bedding. No weapon was found and Louise claimed a pit bull named "Hat Trick," owned by an acquaintance, had killed her daughter. The dog was destroyed. A pathology report by Dr. Charles Randal Smith from Sick Kid's Hospital in Toronto claimed the child died from stab wounds, however he was not told there was a dog present. However, Dr. Rex Ferris of Vancouver, the pathologist who was involved in the famous "dingo baby" case in Australia in the 1980s, disagreed. Louise Reynolds spent three and a half years in jail awaiting trial, and during that time her other children were removed from her care. She was convicted, but exonerated in 2001. It was concluded that the pit bull killed Sharon.
September 17, 1997	Crutwell, Saskatchewan	German Shepherd x Husky cross sled dog	Terrance Keenatch	3 years	At around 4:21 P.M., Keenatch wandered into Herman Campbell's yard and was attacked by a tethered dog. He suffered severe head and neck injuries. Keenatch was taken to the Victoria Hospital in Prince Albert and moved to the Royal University Hospital in Saskatoon, where he died the next day. The dog was euthanized by Campbell's request. Campbell's dogs were well cared for, did not have a history of aggression, and were allowed to play with his grandchildren.
November 27, 1997	Temiskaming Shores, Ontario	Rottweiler	Jonathan King	3 years	King was attacked in his home by his family's dog, Tank, while his mother and paternal half-sister were home. He suffered head and neck injuries. He was found deceased by his father when he returned home, who promptly euthanized Tank.
March 18, 1998	Iqaluit, Nunavut	Husky sled dogs (4-8)	Leah Tikivik	6 years	Tikivik was mauled and partially eaten by sled dogs that were staked to the ice. Her partial remains were found by a five-year-old boy after she had been missing for 24 hours. All of the dogs were euthanized at the owner's request.
April 27, 1998	Stouffville, Ontario	Bullmastiff	Courtney Trempe	8 years	Trempe was playing with two of her neighbour's children in their backyard, where she was bitten on the neck by their dog, Mosley. Her carotid artery was punctured and trachea was crushed. Mosley, who weighed 59 kg (130 lb) and had a history of attacking people, was euthanized by the request of his owners.
August 16, 1998	Zacharias Island (near Hopedale), Newfoundland and Labrador	Husky sled dogs (8)	Betty Gauntlet and Daniel Obed	45 years, 10 years	Gauntlet was attacked by sled dogs while picking berries during a family outing. Soon after she died, her family wanted to protect her body for the dogs by making a fire around it. Daniel went to the boat to get more matches, where the dogs killed him. Along with them was Gauntlet's 49-year-old common-law husband and an eight-year-old boy, both of whom survived. Seven of the eight dogs were euthanized. They were likely left on the island for the summer by their owners, a common practice for Inuit in the area.
December 21, 1998	Cross Lake First Nation, Manitoba	Pack of stray dogs	Kelsen Frogg (or Frogge)	8 years	Frogg was repeatedly bitten in the head by stray dogs while walking home from a friends house and was pronounced dead an hour later. He was carrying a snack and was accustomed to dogs because his family had sled dogs. Seven dogs were euthanized, some weighing over 36 kg (80 lb).
March 7, 1999	Five Mile First Nation (near Atlin), British Columbia	Husky cross	Unnamed female child	3 years	A child died from a broken neck after she was attacked by a neighbour's dog while playing in her yard. Her name was not released nor was the dog owner's name. The dog was euthanized.
May 30, 1999	Mandeville, Quebec	Husky sled dog	Nicolas Boudreau	2 years	Boudreau and his family were visiting friends, who had 24 sled dogs tethered to several kennels on their property. He went outside alone and was found at around 9:30 A.M., partially wrapped in the dog's tether. Boudreau was shaken and scratched by the dog, but his cause of death was a single dog bite to the jugular vein. It is unknown if the dog was euthanized.
July 22, 1999	Łutselk'e, Northwest Territories	Husky cross	Morris Lockhart	2 years	Lockhart suffered severe injuries to his head and neck. He was airlifted to the University of Alberta Hospital in Edmonton on the same day of the attack, but died three days later. His cause of death was from brain stem injuries. The dog, which had no history of attacks, was euthanized.
November 27, 1999	Garden River, Alberta	Pack of stray dogs (5)	Cecilia Sandra Alook	5 years	At approximately 11:30 A.M., Alook was following a puppy around 200 meters away from her residence, where five dogs jumped at her and forced her into a ditch. She suffered severe injuries to her face, neck, and shoulders. The attack may have possibly been hunger motivated. Residents tracked the dogs down to euthanize them.

== Fatalities after 2000 ==
=== Fatalities in 2000-2009 ===
Date	Location	Dog type (Number)	Victim's name	Victim's age	Circumstances
January 27, 2002	Woodland Beach, Ontario	Labrador mix, Rottweiler	Kyra-Lee Sibthorpe	4 years	Sibthorpe was visiting her father at his rented farmhouse. He was not around when his Rottweiler and a friend's Labrador attacked Sibthorpe. She was familiar with the Rottweiler, but the Labrador was new to her. Sibthorpe's father fled the scene after a neighbour called 9-1-1, likely due to his arrest warrants. She was pronounced dead at the Huronia District Hospital in Midland. Both dogs were euthanized. Sibthorpe's father turned himself in to police within a few days.
c. June 11, 2002	Meandering River [sic], Alberta	Rottweiler x German Shepherd mix (1)	Clarence Martel	46 years	His sister's (Nora Apannah) dog of barely one year old jumped on him, bit his leg and cut an artery. He was brought to the hospital of High Level, and was declared dead on arrival.
March 1, 2003	Kingston Peninsula, New Brunswick	Rottweilers (3)	James "Jim" Ronald Waddell	4 years	Waddell, who had previously been in foster care for eighteen months, lived with his father and was under supervision from social workers at the time of the attack. He was hospitalized during the previous summer for a dog bite. Waddell's father and friends, who were all drinking, decided to do some electrical work in the basement. The only way to get into the basement was from outside. Mike Clark, who lived with the Waddells, decided to let his dogs out of their electrically fenced pen while on his way to the basement. Waddell decided to follow the men outside. He was left alone in the backyard, where Clark's dogs mauled him to death. Each dog weighed around 66 kg (145 lb) and Waddell weighed 16 kg (35 lb). Clark's two unneutered dogs may have been excited by Waddell's dog, who was in heat and tethered on the porch. Waddell suffered bite marks all over his body, a broken back, a severed major artery, and had his throat torn out. His cause of death was blood loss. All four dogs were euthanized. Clark claimed that his dogs had no history of aggression. A coroner's inquest found that social workers were concerned about the Waddell's Rottweilers. Charles McKendy, the supervisor of social workers involved in the case, personally did not like Rottweilers, but was assured by social workers that three of the dogs were securely penned, while the fourth was a family pet. The pets were however not the focus of the social workers' intervention; James Waddell's parents rocky relationship was.
October 13, 2003	Nelson House, Manitoba	German Shepherd crosses (4-6)	Unnamed male child	3 years	At around 2:30 P.M., a boy was attacked by his grandmother's dogs in her backyard, where he was playing with a puppy and had some bannock. Her fifteen dogs were tethered, but six broke free and at least four attacked. The boy's grandmother injured her arms while trying to scare away the dogs, which were euthanized by residents before emergency responders arrived. The boy was pronounced dead on arrival at the local medical unit. His name was not released by the request of his family.
December 27, 2004	Maple Ridge, British Columbia	Rottweilers (3), Border Collie	Cody John Anger	3 years	Anger resided with his mother, Sheri Fontaine; her boyfriend, Jason Harvey; and Anger's several older siblings. The children had previously been in foster care due to Fontaine's criminal activity and history of drug abuse. A social worker, who visited them four months prior, said "The risk to the children had been substantially reduced." Fontaine owned two dogs and was temporarily caring for Jenny Babee's two dogs. Babee described Fontaine's border collie as a "crack dog", since Harvey would allegedly put the dog in a box along with crack. Social workers did not believe the dogs were dangerous, but financially draining the family. Babee's dogs were kept outside or in the basement at night while she was away. They were barricaded in the kitchen on the night before Anger's death because another family friend was sleeping in the basement. It is possible that Babee's dogs jumped over the one metre plywood sheet keeping them in the kitchen. Anger was attacked by all four dogs while watching cartoons in the living room. He was found unresponsive by one of his siblings, whose yelling and screaming woke up their mother. Fontaine and Harvey took Anger to the Ridge Meadows Hospital before noon. He was not breathing, had fixed pupils, and no blood pressure nor pulse. Anger was pronounced dead at 12:12 P.M. He suffered injuries to his scalp, neck, extremities, and died from blood loss. Fontaine lost custody of her other children shortly after the incident. All four dogs were euthanized. None of them had a history of aggression nor were they sick with rabies.
May 29, 2006	Wellburn (part of Thames Centre), Ontario	Mongrel	John Martin	77 years	At about 5:00 P.M., Martin's five-year-old dog lunged at his throat while he was "playfully poking" his wife on their driveway. His wife and a female cab driver managed to pull the 40 kg (88 lb) dog off of him. Martin suffered a severed carotid artery and succumbed to his injuries in St. Mary's General Hospital. The dog was euthanized.
June 15, 2006	Tadoule Lake, Manitoba	Husky cross (Unknown number)	Unnamed male child	3 years	A Sayisi Dene child was bitten by dogs while playing with his cousin and died before anyone could get to him. He suffered neck injuries. One dog was promptly euthanized by another resident.
July 27, 2006	Hollow Water First Nation, Manitoba	Huskies (2)	Derian Bird	2 years	Bird was being babysat when he wandered away from his residence. His body was found 200 meters away on a neighbour's property at the edge of a lake. One dog involved in the attack was tethered and the other was loose. Both of them were euthanized.
November 16, 2006	North Tallcree, Alberta	Rottweiler, German Shepherd cross, unknown (3 or 4)	Lancelet Corbin Wyatt Loonskin	5 years	Loonskin left a female relative's residence without her knowledge at around 6:00 P.M. Less than an hour later, his body was found after two men in the area heard dogs barking outside. Loonskin suffered trauma to his face and upper body. Two of the dogs involved in the attack were a resident's pets and had no history of violence. Both of them were euthanized.
January 18, 2007	Cumberland House, Saskatchewan	Unknown (5 or 6)	Unnamed male child	5 years	A Cree child was mauled by dogs at the side of a road near his residence. His mother found him at about 10:30 A.M. and took him to the local health center. He was transferred to a hospital in Saskatoon, where he later died. The child suffered hypothermia and bite wounds to his head, face, and upper body. Community members euthanized at least four dogs after the incident. Some of the dogs belonged to another resident, who was frequently warned that the dogs would be euthanized if they were not kept under control.
July 1, 2007	Montague, Ontario	Rottweiler x German Shepherd cross	Korie Lyn Edwards	1 year	At around 6:30 P.M., Edwards was mauled by her grandparents' 10-year-old dog. She suffered severe head injuries. Edwards was taken to a local hospital before being transferred to the Children's Hospital of Eastern Ontario in Ottawa, where she died. The dog, which was euthanized, was tethered and did not have a violent history. Edwards' grandparents were not charged.

=== Fatalities in 2010-2019 ===
Date		Dog type (Number)	Victim's name	Victim's age	Circumstances
January 30, 2010	Canoe Lake, Saskatchewan	Unidentified (3)	Keith Iron	10 years	Iron was killed by three loose locally owned dogs in a northern reserve, Canoe Lake (Saskatchewan), while walking to a family member's house. The dogs, which had been aggressive to other community members, were put down because they returned to the scene before the victim's body could be removed.
March 22, 2010	Pangnirtung, Nunavut	Husky (3)	Sabock Akpalialuk	4 years	Akpalialuk was killed by three sled dogs when they escaped from their yard, chased him and mauled him. He died from extensive injuries to his neck.
June 7, 2010	Saint-Barnabé-Sud, Quebec	Husky (1 or 2)	Unnamed female child	3 weeks	The infant was strapped in her car seat and placed on a kitchen chair while her 17-year-old mother and 37-year-old grandmother went outside to smoke. They left the door open and were fewer than three meters away. Police reported that the two were gone for at least twenty minutes, but a lawyer claimed they were gone for five minutes or shorter. Both of them went back inside once they heard noise inside the house and called emergency responders at around 3:30 P.M. The mother was charged with manslaughter less than a day after the incident. She pleaded not guilty and was released under several conditions, including that she cannot care for children under twelve years old. There was not enough evidence to charge the grandmother. The infant's father, who was not home during the attack, did not believe the mother was at fault. Two dogs that belonged to the homeowners were seized from the residence and at least one was euthanized. They had no history of violence.
August 21, 2011	Mosquito First Nation (?), Saskatchewan	Unknown (2)	Flora Francis	1 years	Francis wandered unto a ward where the two dogs attacked her. The dogs were destroyed by their owner.
February 15, 2012	Airdrie, Alberta	Siberian Husky (1)	Grayson Fradette	2 days	The Fradette family operated a dog sled equipment company and had four huskies in their home. According to friend Dawn Donald, the dog had escaped its kennel and went to investigate when the baby woke up crying in his crib. The family believed the dog, which had recently given birth, was trying to comfort the child. Police and paramedics responded to a dog-bite call at around 10 A.M., and around 12 hours later, on February 16, the baby died at Alberta's Children Hospital in Calgary, surrounded by his family. The dog had no history of violence.
March 16, 2014	Oakbank, Manitoba	Alaskan Malamute (2)	Gracie Hernetier-Clark	7 years	Hernetier-Clark from St. Andrews was visiting the home of her grandparents' friends. She was playing with their two dogs. The adults stepped away for a minute and the two Alaskan Malamutes attacked her. She was pronounced dead at the Children's Hospital in Winnipeg.
April 15, 2014	Lac Brochet, Manitoba	Unknown Large Breeds (2)	Raquelle (or Racquelle) Tssessaze	10 years	Tssessaze lived in a fly-in remote community 900 km north of Winnipeg. Racquelle was going to or returning from taekwondo class and took a shortcut through a trail in the forest. One source states she was with two companions, while others state she was alone. At around 6:00 P.M. she was attacked by a community member's dogs. One source states two friends from class ran for help. A man, Jack Denecheze, raced to her on his snowmobile or truck. Her companions were uninjured, but Tssessaze died en route to the local nursing station. Both dogs were euthanized. Two weeks prior to her death, another girl in Lac Brochet was chased by dogs.
April 24, 2014	Winnipeg, Manitoba	Mixed Medium Sized Dogs (2)	Unnamed Male	58 years	A man went to a neighbour's residence in the north end of Winnipeg to purchase a generator from the owner. He entered the backyard and was attacked by two dogs. He suffered serious injuries to his arms, hands, and legs, and died. A neighbour reported that the dogs were loud and intimidating. Since this was the third dog mauling in Manitoba in eight weeks, the police stressed to the media that the man also suffered a cardiac arrest during the attack and that the public needed to wait for an autopsy report. However, there is no update as to the autopsy report by the police, nor any update to the investigation, so whether the man suffered cardiac arrest from blood loss is not confirmed.
June 14, 2014	Quebec, Nunavik, Puvirnituq	Husky	Sheena Levina Jenny Uqaituk	4 years	Uqaituk was mauled by a sled dog who was chained on a neighbour's property. She died from her extensive injuries.
July 9, 2015	Hamilton, Ontario	Shar-Pei x Fila mix	Matthew Brigmantas	32 or 33 years	Matthew Brigmantas, a construction worker, was walking with another man and a dog, described as between 40 and 45 lbs, when the dog attacked him. Brigmantas fell to the ground and the dog attacked his chest and would not let go. A passerby heard screaming from Brigmantas and grabbed a baseball bat to attack the dog. When the dog was finally pulled off Brigmantas, he was deceased. It took five hours to seize the dog, and required it be pepper sprayed. A coroner's investigation determined that Brigmantas ultimately did not die of the dog's wounds, but by a medical emergency caused by the attack. However, the attack was part of the cause of death and the dog was euthanized.
October 17, 2015	Ross River, Yukon	Rez dog (4)	Shane Glada	22 years	Shane Glada had been missing several days when he was discovered in a gully near houses in the rural Kaska community. He had been killed by four stray dogs while walking in the woods. The dogs were feral or semi-domesticated.
January 30, 2016	Kamloops, British Columbia	Mutt	Kathleen Green	78 years	Green was killed in Kamloops, British Columbia by a family member's dog who was tied up in a backyard.
June 6, 2016	Chesterfield Inlet, Nunavut	Rez dog	Unnamed female child	4 years	A four-year-old girl was killed by a dog in Chesterfield Inlet, Nunavut. The dog had not been tied up properly and mauled the girl, who died on arrival to the hospital.
June 8, 2016	Montreal, Quebec	Pit bull	Christiane Vadnais	55 years	Victim was killed in her own yard by a neighbour's escaped dog that had a muzzle dangling around its neck. The dog had previously bitten two others and was so aggressive its owner kept it muzzled when in his home. The owner of the dog could have been charged with criminal negligence. The victim's sister wrote a book about her sister's life and violent death, and the aftermath, including bullying and threats by pit bull defenders.
May 13, 2017	Little Grand Rapids, Manitoba	Stray dogs (large pack)	Donnelly Rose Eaglestick	24 years	Eaglestick was chased down and attacked while walking home at night through a construction site. She was severely mauled and had died of her injuries when the body was found the following morning.
July 27, 2017	Kitchener, Ontario	Boxer x Bulldog mix	Andrew Kochut	Adult	Andrew Kochut died after having a seizure in his girlfriend's apartment. Andrew Kochut's girlfriend stated the dog had attacked him, but the cause of death was not ruled as a result of the dog bite. The cause of death was not determined as at the date of the article.
September 13, 2017	Riceton, Saskatchewan	Alaskan Malamutes	Cameron Mushanski	6 years	Cameron had been playing in his grandparents' yard after school. He reached into a dog pen and was pulled halfway into the pen by two of his grandparents' dogs and mauled on his upper body. The dogs had a prior police history of attacking domestic animals in Alberta, yet the grandmother claimed there had been no incidents. The dogs were destroyed. After this incident, the grandparents still owned fifteen pugs and two guard dogs.
September 15, 2018	Rocky View County, Alberta	Pit bull Mix	Lisa Lloyd	49 or 50 years	Lloyd was killed by her own dog, Jackson, while trying to protect her toddler granddaughter. The attack occurred shortly after 6:00 P.M. at Lloyd's residence near Langdon and Chestermere. Her granddaughter was taken to the Alberta Children's Hospital for severe injuries to her limbs, but was in stable condition. Lloyd was pronounced dead at the scene. Jackson was euthanized and tested negative for any diseases. He did not have a history of violence, but neighbours found him "intimidating" and complained of his frequent barking.
June 29, 2019	Quebec, Nunavic, Kangiqsujuaq	Sled dog (1+)	Undisclosed	1 year	The boy was found dead with bite marks.
September 23, 2019	God's Lake First Nation, Manitoba	Stray dogs (1-2)	Unnamed male child	2 years	A child wandered away from his residence, where he was with a family member. It is believed he was promptly grabbed by dogs and dragged to a wooded area. Authorities, who responded to the incident at approximately 12:45 P.M., pronounced him dead at the scene. Community members euthanized several dogs returning to the area.

=== Fatalities in 2020-2026 ===
Date	Location	Dog type (Number)	Victim's name	Victim's age	Circumstances
June 9, 2020	Middle Musquodoboit, Nova Scotia	Pit bull, (American Bully)	Megan Milner	38 years	Megan Milner was last seen giving water to her dog on a walk at 7:45 a.m. before it attacked and killed her. Shortly after 8:00 A.M., a teenaged pedestrian found Milner in a ditch near the intersection at Webster and Wittenburg Roads. Police tweeted a warning about the dog. At around 9:30 A.M., it was intentionally struck and killed by a vehicle on Highway 224. The dog, a male, attacked another dog at an off-leash park in 2017. It also mauled Milner in 2018, who had to be hospitalized. Milner's mother previously suggested that she surrender him. Both of Milner's pit bulls had prior involvement with police. One had been removed from Milner's home by Animal Services. The male dog that killed Milner was supposed to be wearing a muzzle, and was known by neighbours to be aggressive. The man who struck the dog was not charged, as he did not have criminal intent and was concerned about the public's safety. The dog was confirmed to be an American Bully through DNA testing.
June 29, 2020	Kamloops, British Columbia	Pit bull	Unnamed adult male	Unknown	A man was visiting the residence of a male friend when he allegedly suffered a seizure and was killed by the friend's pit bull. Three other adults were inside the residence in the 900 block on Singh Street, Kamloops, but did not see the attack. Police received a report about the attack at 11:45 A.M. The dog was sedated before being removed and euthanized. Due to an ongoing investigation, police refused to release the man's name.
April 1, 2021	Muncey (part of Strathroy-Caradoc) Ontario	Unreported Large Breed (3)	Megan Fay Fisher	17 years	Fisher, a senior student from the Chippewas of the Thames First Nation, was visiting the residence of a family friend, 30-year-old Andrew Littleton, when she was attacked by his dogs. She was pronounced dead at his residence on Gentleman Drive at about 2:30 P.M. All three dogs were euthanized.
August 15, 2021	Pitt Meadows, British Columbia	Rottweiler (2)	Ping Guo	54 years	The victim was visiting a blueberry farm and was found dead by other visitors. Due to her traumatic injuries, conservation officers first thought she was attacked by a black bear. The victim's family suspected a dog attack early on, but it was only confirmed after the dogs' DNA was tested following another fatality next to the blueberry farm seventeen months later. The two dogs were euthanized in January 2023 not long after the second fatality.
June 1, 2022	Witchekan Lake First Nation, Saskatchewan	Pit bulls	Noel Thomas	43 years	Noel Thomas was helping his neighbours mow their lawn when the neighbours' two dogs charged at him from behind. Neighbours released their dogs on the attacking dogs to try to stop the attack. Thomas was pronounced dead at the scene despite CPR attempts. The RCMP of nearby Spiritwood assisted in the investigation and the dogs were seized.
June 5, 2022	Calgary, Alberta	American Staffordshire Terrier (3)	Betty Ann Williams	86 years	Betty Ann Williams, an elderly woman, was gardening in the alleyway beside her home when she was attacked and killed by her neighbours' three dogs. The owner, Denis Bagaric, claimed he was in his backyard with his dogs, and that he then noticed his gate was askew. After the attack, he claimed on social media that this was not his dogs' fault and the story was false, which he then deleted. In a later media statement he claimed that the victim mistook the attack, that the dogs were playing, and blamed her because she "swung a bag of dandelions" at the dogs in defense. While Bagaric removed one attacking dog, Smoki, to his garage, his other two dogs, Bossi and Cinnamon, fatally mauled Williams. The incident was covered heavily in the media due to the fact that the owner, Bagaric, had a prior history of charges for possession of drugs, and had lied that he had been the one to call 911 during the attack on Williams. Bagaric had previously uploaded to social media a video of a Medicine Hat police officer euthanizing a fawn by stabbing it and slitting its throat. Also, the ambulance to assist Williams took thirty minutes to arrive, causing community concern and an internal investigation, which led to a report that a communication breakdown had occurred. Bagaric and his girlfriend, Taylin Calkins, were jointly charged with 12 offenses under the Calgary Responsible Pet Bylaw. Police claimed there was insufficient evidence to press criminal charges against Bagaric and Calkins. Bagaric had long been known to police for the drunk driving death of his passenger, a sixteen-year-old, in Alberta in 2007.
June 8, 2022	Sudbury, Ontario	Husky (1)	Sylvain Boissonneault	56 years	The man sustained a minor injury from a bite by his dog and died a few days later due to an infection with capnocytophaga canimorsus.
September 14, 2022	Quebec, Nunavik, Quaqtaq	Sled dog	Girl	1 years	The 23-month-old girl was bitten fifteen times by a female dog.
January 3, 2023	Pitt Meadows, British Columbia	Rottweiler (2)	Baljit Haer	Undisclosed	The dog owner was killed by the same dogs that killed Ping Guo in 2021. It was confirmed by DNA analysis.
March 5, 2023	Whitefish Lake First Nation, Naughton, Alberta	Rottweiler mixes (2), Rez dog - either a Pit bull mix or Rottweiler mix, pending DNA results (1)	Avery (Surname not published)	5 years	A five-year-old boy, Avery, who was in the care of Alberta Child Services, had been placed with biological family after being in the care of a foster family. Avery was playing outside, unsupervised, at his grandparents' home on Whitefish Lake First Nation, north of Slave Lake, about 375 km north of Edmonton, when a relative's two Rottweiller mix dogs along with a "reservation dog" attacked and killed him. Upon discovering Avery, the family immediately destroyed their two Rottweiler mix dogs, while police searched for and found the third dog and destroyed it. The public demanded an answer from Alberta Child Services why the child had died while in their care, a national issue of child deaths while under government care often reported in Canadian media, and there was community outrage that loose reservation dogs had been allowed to roam the area.
June 6, 2023	Burlington, Ontario	Pit bull	Jean Lilly Elizabeth Cluckie	76 years	A "highly aggressive dog" attacked three people. The dog had been living with two of the victims, Jean and Brian, for a while. The police attempted to subdue the dog but ultimately had to shoot it. Jean passed away ten days later in hospital.
January 11, 2024	Quebec, Nunavik, Salluit	Undisclosed	Sam	4 years	The boy was attacked outside his home and died due the severity of his injuries.
April 1, 2024	Edmonton, Alberta	Cane Corso (2)	Kache Grist	11 years	The boy from southern B. C. visited his father and was attacked by two dogs of a roommate. The dogs had a history of aggression.
November 17–18, 2024	Bonfield, Ontario	Unknown (3)	Unknown	81 years	An 81 years old woman was killed after being attacked by her three dogs. She was pronounced dead at the scene.
February 17, 2025	Entwistle, Alberta	Medium-sized dog (1)	Unknown	14 days	A 14-day-old baby boy died after a dog attack. The dog was the family pet. The baby was airlifted to the Stollery Children's Hospital in Edmonton with a serious, life-threatening injury. Despite efforts of medical professionals, the baby was declared dead. The dog was surrendered and being kept at a facility until investigators were able to speak with Alberta's chief veterinarian.
February 21, 2025	Keeseekoowenin Ojibway First Nation, Manitoba	Unknown (5)	Unknown	56 years	The man was found lying motionless face-down in the snow, with dogs attacking him. The paramedics remained in their vehicles, but tried to scare the dogs away using their ambulance. A police officer left his vehicle and yelled at the dogs, which then attacked him. Two dogs were shot, with the rest fleeing to the home in front of which the victim was attacked. The man died in a motel on February 23. The band office of the community will decide the three other dogs' fate.
January 5, 2026	Shelburne, Nova Scotia	Cane Corso (2) Rottweiler (1)	Drew Nickerson	13 years	The boy was attacked while riding his bike and died two days later in the hospital. The three dogs were euthanized.

== See also ==
- Dog bite
- Animal attack
- Wolf attacks on humans
- List of wolf attacks
- Coyote attacks on humans
- Animal attacks
- Beware of the dog
- List of fatal bear attacks in North America
- List of fatal cougar attacks in North America
