= Cochrane River (Manitoba) =

River in Western Canada

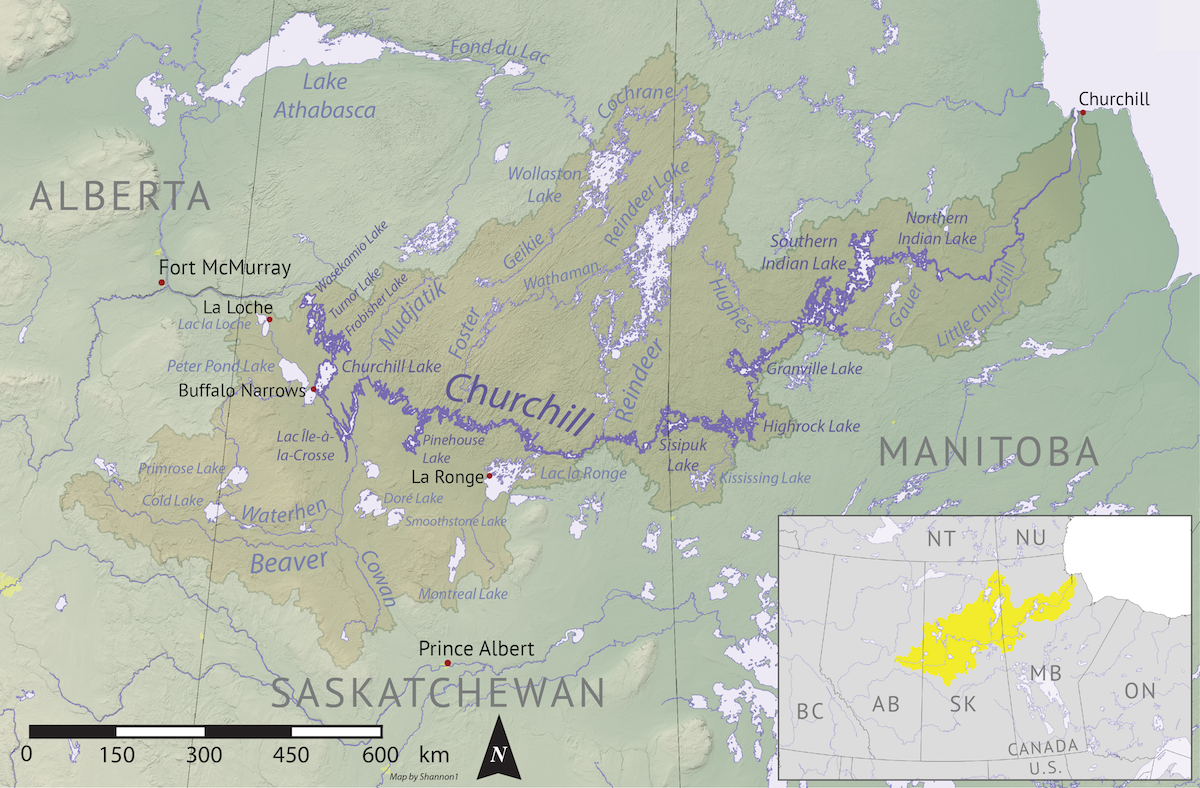

- Location of the mouth of the Cochrane River in Canada Cochrane River (Manitoba) (Canada)

Location
- Country: Canada

Physical characteristics
- Source: Wollaston Lake
  - location: Saskatchewan
  - coordinates: 58°38′27″N 103°01′01″W
  - elevation: 398 m (1,306 ft)
- Mouth: Reindeer Lake
  - location: Manitoba
  - coordinates: 57°53′6″N 101°34′14″W
  - elevation: 337 m (1,106 ft)
- Length: 250 km (160 mi)
- Basin size: 28,400 km^{2} (11,000 sq mi)
- Discharge
  - location: near Brochet
  - average: 167 m^{3}/s (5,900 cu ft/s)

Basin features
- River system: Churchill River drainage basin

The Cochrane River is a river in Canadian provinces of Manitoba and Saskatchewan. Located in the boreal forest of the Canadian Shield, it flows from Wellbelove Bay on the northern end of Wollaston Lake in north-eastern Saskatchewan to the north-east end of Reindeer Lake in Manitoba. The river has a drainage basin of 28,400 square kilometres (11,000 sq mi) and is part of the Churchill River drainage basin.

The river flows north then east through a series of lakes (Bannock Lake and Charcoal Lake) in Saskatchewan and then flows in a southerly direction through lakes (Misty Lake and Lac Brochet) in Manitoba before entering Brochet Bay on the north-eastern end of the Manitoba section of Reindeer Lake.

The remote Manitoba community of Lac Brochet is located on Lac Brochet, and Brochet and Barren Lands are near the river's mouth.

== See also ==
- List of rivers of Saskatchewan
- List of rivers of Manitoba
- Hudson Bay drainage basin
