= Le Pensie =

Former trading post in Northern Manitoba

Le Pensie Sandy Hills
- Former trading post
- Location within Manitoba
- Coordinates: 58°27.4′N 101°9.8′W
- Country: Canada
- Province: Manitoba
- Region: Northern Manitoba
- Post active: 1922-1930
- Named for: Adolphe Lapensée

Le Pensie is an uninhabited locality and former trading post in Northern Manitoba. It is located southeast of Lac Brochet, on the Cochrane River, just north of Cann Lake.

== History ==
The site is named for Adolphe Lapensée, known in English as Adolf La Pensie, who was a Hudson's Bay Company post manager and fur trader, originally from Plantagenet, Ontario.

After leaving the HBC, Lapensée became an independent fur trader in 1922, operating a post in the Cochrane River area. In 1930, he moved to Brochet with his children so they could attend school, and the post was closed.

The site was first noted on a map by the Department of the Interior in 1925. The name's official status was revoked in 1950, but reinstated in 1979.
