= Keewatin Tribal Council =

Coordinates: 55°44′47.8″N 97°51′30.2″W

- Headquarters: 23 Nickel Road, Thompson, Manitoba, R8N 0Y4
- Members: 16,818 (2013)
- Chairperson (2022): Chief Betsy Kennedy
- Main organ: Executive Council
- Website: http://ktc.ca/

Keewatin Tribal Council is a tribal council representing 11 First Nation band governments in Northern Manitoba.

Its head offices are located in Thompson, Manitoba, with a secondary office in Winnipeg.

== Members ==
The Keewatin Tribal Council represents the following First Nation band governments (registered populations as of August 2013).

First Nation	Office location	Registered population (as of 2013)
Barren Lands First Nation	Brochet	1,088
Bunibonibee Cree Nation	Oxford House	2,892
Fox Lake Cree Nation	Gillam	1,165
God's Lake First Nation	Gods Lake Narrows	2,603
Manto Sipi Cree Nation	Gods River	646
Northlands Dene First Nation	Lac Brochet,	1,035
Sayisi Dene First Nation	Tadoule Lake	774
Shamattawa First Nation	Shamattawa	1,508
Tataskweyak Cree Nation	Split Lake	3,582
War Lake First Nation	Ilford	286
York Factory	York Landing	1,239
