= XTL =

XTL or xtl may refer to:

- XTL, the IATA code for Tadoule Lake Airport, Manitoba, Canada
- xtl, the ISO 639-3 code for Tijaltepec Mixtec language, Oaxaca, Mexico
- XTL fuel, an alternative diesel fuel made by converting a source material into a liquid energy carrier
