= National Ribbon Skirt Day =

Canadian observance day

- Type: Secular
- Significance: Commemorating the ribbon skirt traditionally worn by Indigenous women
- Date: January 4
- Frequency: Annual
- First time: 2023; 2 years ago
- Started by: Mary Jane McCallum

National Ribbon Skirt Day (French: Journée nationale de la jupe à rubans) is a day in Canada celebrating the ribbon skirt traditionally worn by Indigenous women. The day takes place on 4 January, and was first celebrated in 2023.

The day was inspired by the experience of Isabella Kulak, an Indigenous girl in Saskatchewan who was shamed for wearing a ribbon skirt to a "formal dress day" at her elementary school. Prompted by Kulak's experience, Manitoba Senator Mary Jane McCallum put forward a bill in Parliament to recognize National Ribbon Skirt Day, which received unanimous support and was passed into law in December 2022.

== History ==
Ribbon skirts are traditionally worn by women and girls for Indigenous ceremonies. In December 2020, Isabella Kulak, an Indigenous girl of Cote First Nation in fifth grade, wore a ribbon skirt to a "formal day" at her elementary school, Kamsack Comprehensive Institute, in Kamsack, Saskatchewan. The dress was black with white flowers and a blue, green, and black ribbon on it. However, Kulak was told by an educational assistant that her ribbon dress was not fit for formal day, as her mismatched skirt and shirt did not meet the standard of "formal dress". The assistant said Kulak should have worn an outfit similar to that of another student, who was wearing a store-bought dress.

This interaction prompted a reaction on social media, national and international support for Kulak, a march to the school, and a push for the federal government to recognize the ribbon skirt. On the first day back to school following the December 2021 holidays, a march was held to walk Kulak to school, culminating in a ceremony. The school district, Good Spirit School Division, later apologized to the family and to the Cote First Nation for the remark.

In November 2021, inspired by Kulak's experience, Senator Mary Jane McCallum put forward Bill S-219, An Act respecting a National Ribbon Skirt Day, in Parliament. The bill was unanimously supported in Parliament and received royal assent in December 2022.

The first official National Ribbon Skirt Day was celebrated on 4 January 2023.

== See also ==
- Orange Shirt Day
