= Ribbon work =

Indigenous North American appliqué technique

Ribbon work is an appliqué technique for clothing and dance regalia among Prairie and Great Lakes indigenous peoples.

== Description ==
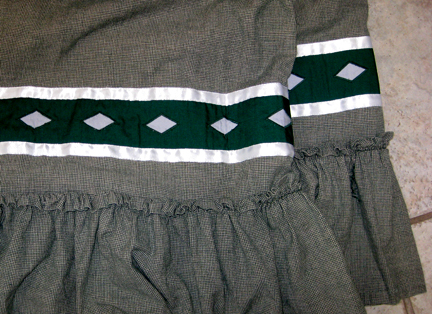
Simple, rattlesnake design ribbon work on skirt by Ardina Moore (Quapaw-Osage)

The ribbons are layered on top of each other with pieces cut out to create optically active designs from both positive and negative space. The ribbons' edges are sewn with needles and cotton thread – later, with nylon thread. Designs and colors may be significant to particular clans. Specific patterns are passed from mother to daughters within families. Design elements can include floral designs, diamonds, stepped diamonds, crescents, hearts, circles, and double-curves.

Traditionally, Ribbon Skirts are worn in ceremonies or at special events, and are representative of a person’s unique diversity and strength. Women, girls and gender diverse people also wear them to express pride and confidence in their Indigenous identity and heritage.

== History ==
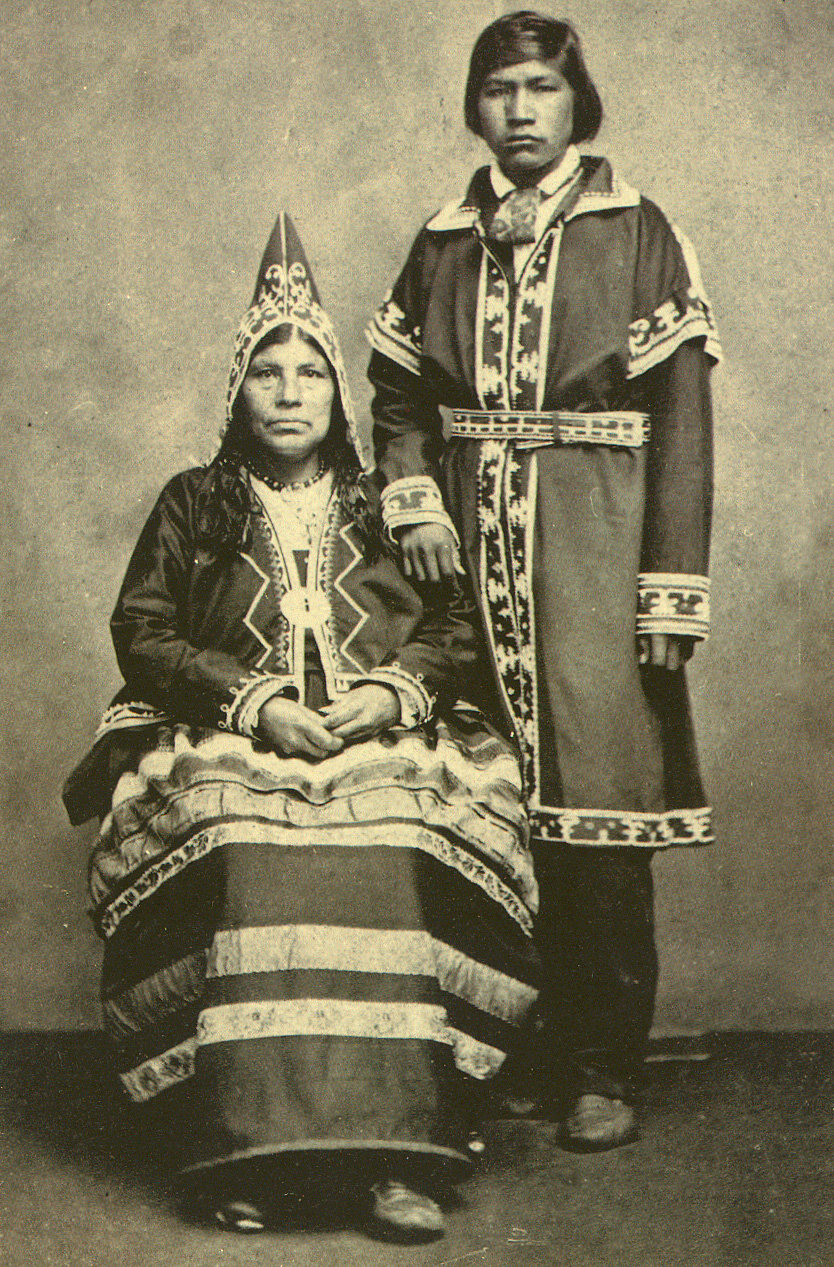
1865 photograph of a Mi'kmaq woman and son

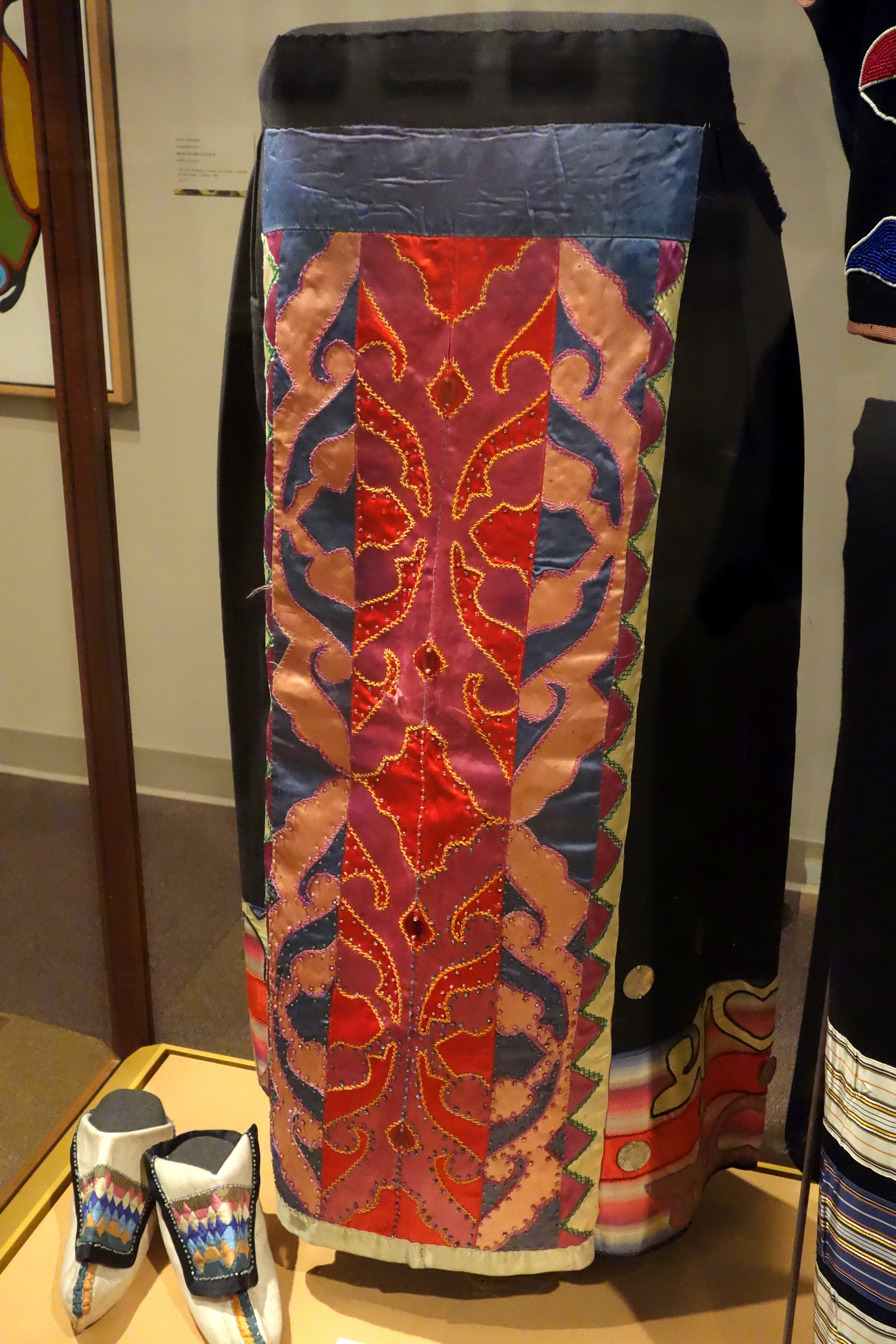
Meskwaki ribbon skirt of the early 1900s (Glenbow Museum, Calgary, Canada)

Silk ribbons, brought to North America by European traders, inspired a new, uniquely North American art form. Mi'kmaq people created ribbon appliqué as early as 1611. The Meskwaki (English exonym Fox), amongst the signers of the great 1701 peace treaty of Montreal, also had early contact with the French. In 1789, the regime of the French Revolution decreed that clothing should be plain, so silk ribbons fell out of fashion in France and were exported to North America.

Consequently, the people of the northern plains who traded furs with the French became known for their ribbon work. They include Métis, Ojibwe, and Cree. Later, the art spread to many others. Initially, layers of ribbons were sewn on the edges of cloth, replacing painted lines on hide clothing and blankets. By the close of the 18th century, indigenous seamstresses created much more intricate appliqué ribbon work designs.

=== Modern use ===
==== Canada ====
Today ribbon work can be seen on dance regalia at ceremonies and powwows. Ribbon work is applied to both men's and women's clothing and is incorporated into leggings, skirts, blankets, shawls, breechclouts, purses, shirts, vests, pillows, and other cloth items.

The Blood Tribe Police Service of Alberta, and the Anishinabek Police Service of Ontario have made a ribbon skirt part of their standard uniform when circumstances don't require a police duty belt.

===== RCMP =====
The Women's Indigenous Network (WIN) of Canada's national police force, the RCMP obtained changes to uniform policy to allow wearing Eagle Feathers or a Métis sash, and an Indigenous ensign on name tags. WIN was started in 2021 by Sergeant Kelly Willis, from a Cree reserve at Chisasibi in northern Quebec, to support Indigenous women and Two-Spirit employees of the RCMP.

Now, the RCMP has added a ribbon skirt to the official uniform options.

On February 14, 2024, Commissioner Mike Duheme approved the addition of the RCMP Ribbon Skirt as an Indigenous cultural item of honour and distinction to be worn by Indigenous Regular Members as part of the uniform. The Ribbon Skirt is a symbol of resilience, survival, identity and hope. The navy blue skirt has four satin ribbons circling it just below knee height. The ribbons are adjacent to signify unity. Their colours yellow, red, blue, and white, represent the four directions amongst some Indigenous communities. They also echo the RCMP colours.

==== United States ====
Similar to Canada, ribbon skirts can be seen at ceremonies and powwows. In 2021, United States politician Deb Haaland wore a ribbon skirt made by Agnes Woodward for her swearing in ceremony as US Interior Secretary.

==== National Ribbon Skirt Day ====
Canada's National Ribbon Skirt Day is held on 4 January.

Isabella (Bella) Kulak, a 10-year-old member of Cote First Nation, wore a ribbon skirt to her school's formal dress-up day on 18 December 2020. After she arrived at Kamsack Comprehensive Institute, 82 kilometres north-east of Yorkton, Saskatchewan, an education assistant mistakenly told her the skirt was not appropriate as formal wear. In response, family and community members escorted Kulak on her return to school on 4 January 2022. The incident was widely publicized and Kulak received support from as far away as Puerto Rico and Germany. After discussion, the school decided to have a ribbon skirt day in January 2023.

Subsequently, Senator Mary Jane McCallum tabled Bill S-219 in Parliamentary to create a national ribbon skirt day. It was supported unanimously in parliament. An Act Respecting a National Ribbon Skirt Day, received Royal Assent on 15 December 2022. On 4 January 2023, the first National Ribbon Skirt Day was celebrated. The Bill "was passed thanks to the commitment and leadership of Isabella Kulak, her family, Chief George Cote of the Cote First Nation, Treaty 4 Territory in Saskatchewan, Senator Mary Jane McCallum, and Jenica Atwin, Member of Parliament for Fredericton, who began advocating for this day after Isabella was shamed for wearing her Ribbon Skirt to school."

==== Contemporary designers ====
As the importance of recognizing ribbon skirts and their indigenous fashion have risen, there are a few modern or contemporary designers of noting who have contributed to the resurgence of this piece of clothing.

Bethany Yellowtail is a Northern Cheyenne Tribe member, and a descendant of the Crow Tribe of Montana. She is a fashion designer living in Los Angeles, California, and is known for her indigenous fashion designs that she sells. Her company B. Yellowtail is extremely successful, selling more contemporary versions of ribbon skirts. From adding fringe and shortening ribbon skirts, to incorporating the ribbon skirt design on pants and blazers, she has taken the concept of ribbon skirts and modernized it in a way to increase recognition of Native fashion styles and clothing.

== See also ==
- Dush-toh, Caddo women's ribbon headdress
