= Lac Brochet Airport =

Airport in Manitoba, Canada

- IATA: XLB; ICAO: CZWH

Summary
- Airport type: Public
- Operator: Government of Manitoba
- Location: Lac Brochet, Manitoba
- Time zone: CST (UTC−06:00)
  - Summer (DST): CDT (UTC−05:00)
- Elevation AMSL: 1,211 ft (369 m)
- Coordinates: 58°36′52″N 101°28′08″W

Map
- Location in Manitoba CZWH (Canada)

Runways
Direction	Length		Surface
Direction	ft	m	Surface
03/21	3,500	1,067	Crushed rock

Statistics (2010)
- Aircraft movements: 1,524
- Source: Canada Flight Supplement; Movements from Statistics Canada

Lac Brochet Airport (IATA: XLB, ICAO: CZWH) is located 1 nautical mile (1.9 km; 1.2 mi) east of Lac Brochet, Manitoba, Canada.

== Airlines and destinations ==
Airlines	Destinations
Perimeter Aviation	Tadoule Lake, Thompson, Winnipeg

== See also ==
- List of airports in Manitoba
