= Lac Brochet =

Lake in Manitoba, Canada

- Location in Manitoba Lac Brochet (Canada)
- Location: Division No. 23, North-West Manitoba
- Coordinates: 58°36′34″N 101°34′44″W
- Type: glacial
- Primary inflows: Cochrane River
- Primary outflows: Cochrane River
- Basin countries: Canada
- Surface elevation: 361 m (1,184 ft)
- Settlements: Lac Brochet

Lac Brochet is a lake in north-west Manitoba, Canada. The westernmost extensions of the lake reach almost to the border with Saskatchewan. Lac Brochet, Manitoba the main community and administrative centre of the Northlands First Nation is located on its eastern shore. The Cochrane River flows from Wollaston Lake through Lac Brochet on its way to Reindeer Lake.

== See also ==
- List of lakes of Manitoba
- Brochet, Manitoba (a community on Reindeer Lake)
