= Brochet, Manitoba =

Brochet
- Unincorporated community
- Location within Manitoba
- Coordinates: 57.87972°N 101.67111°W
- Country: Canada
- Province: Manitoba
- Region: Northern
- First established: 1882

Area
  - Land: 3.36 km^{2} (1.30 sq mi)

Population (2016)
  - Total: 2,410
  - Density: 71.6/km^{2} (185/sq mi)

Brochet (English: /broʊˈʃeɪ/) is an unincorporated community located in Northern Manitoba on the northern shore of Reindeer Lake near the Saskatchewan border; it is designated as a northern community.

There is no year-round road service to the mostly Cree population. A winter road is in place only a few months a year. Air service at Brochet Airport is the main link outside the community. It takes roughly one hour to reach Brochet from Thompson, Manitoba, by air, and approximately 4 to 6 hours via winter road from Lynn Lake, depending on road conditions.

In Northern Manitoba, there are a few unincorporated communities aside from Brochet, such as Granville Lake and South Indian Lake. There are also several First Nations and Aboriginal communities, such as: Barren Lands First Nation, Northlands First Nation, Sayisi Dene, Split Lake Cree, Fox Lake, Shamattawa, and Mathias Colomb.

== History ==
Founded as a Hudson's Bay Company trading post and Roman Catholic mission, the community was originally called Fort du Brochet, first appearing on maps in 1883. The community's name was shortened in 1924 to Brochet, which is the French name of the northern pike, commonly known in Manitoba as the "jackfish."

Brochet's Cree inhabitants historically ranged over a wide area, and in the fur trade era, other trading posts once competed for their business. Nearby locations of this type include Le Pensie, also known as Sandy Hills, which closed in 1930.

== Climate ==
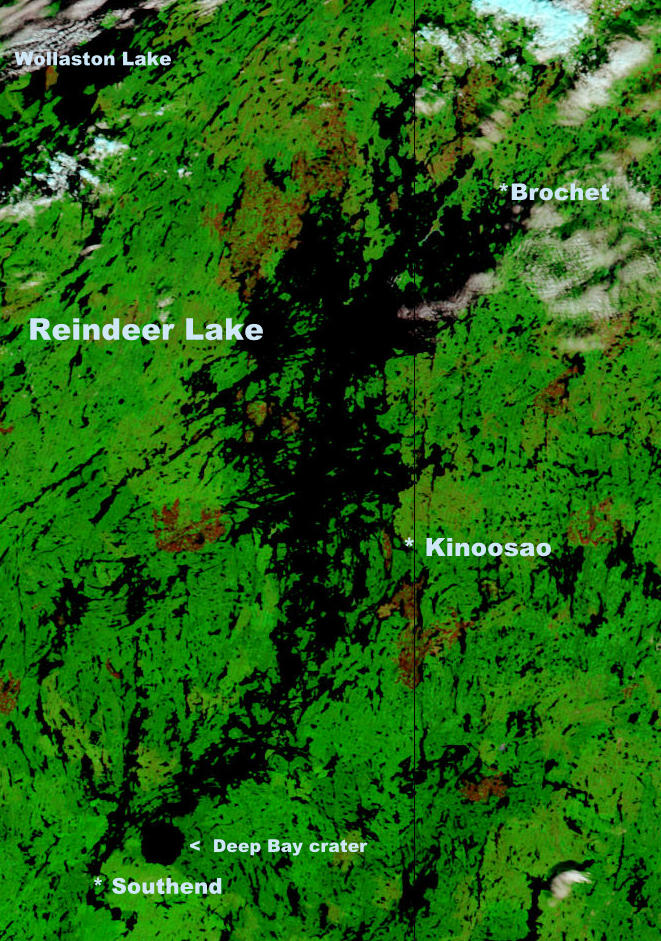
Location of Brochet on a NASA satellite map of Reindeer Lake

The climate of Brochet is extremely variable. The hottest temperature ever recorded was 33.5 °C on August 11, 1991, and the lowest −51.7 °C on February 15, 1966.

Climate data for Brochet A, Manitoba, 1988–2006 normals, 1948–2006 extremes: 346m (1135ft)
Month	Jan	Feb	Mar	Apr	May	Jun	Jul	Aug	Sep	Oct	Nov	Dec	Year
Record high °C (°F)	8 (46)	7 (45)	11 (52)	24 (75)	27 (80)	32 (89)	33 (91)	33 (92)	27 (81)	18 (65)	9 (49)	6 (42)	33 (92)
Mean maximum °C (°F)	−4.6 (23.7)	−1.5 (29.3)	6.6 (43.8)	12.6 (54.7)	22.3 (72.1)	27.1 (80.7)	28.5 (83.3)	27.6 (81.7)	21.8 (71.2)	12.7 (54.8)	0.8 (33.5)	−1.9 (28.6)	30.1 (86.1)
Mean daily maximum °C (°F)	−18.8 (−1.9)	−15.4 (4.3)	−7.3 (18.9)	1.7 (35.1)	10.1 (50.2)	18.4 (65.1)	21.9 (71.4)	19.5 (67.1)	11.7 (53.1)	2.6 (36.7)	−8.5 (16.7)	−15.4 (4.2)	1.7 (35.1)
Daily mean °C (°F)	−24.6 (−12.3)	−21.8 (−7.3)	−14.2 (6.5)	−4.9 (23.1)	3.7 (38.7)	12.1 (53.7)	15.8 (60.5)	14.1 (57.4)	7.2 (44.9)	−1.1 (30.0)	−12.8 (9.0)	−20.9 (−5.6)	−4.0 (24.9)
Mean daily minimum °C (°F)	−31.2 (−24.1)	−28.0 (−18.4)	−21.2 (−6.2)	−11.4 (11.5)	−2.3 (27.9)	5.9 (42.6)	10.1 (50.1)	8.9 (48.0)	2.8 (37.1)	−4.6 (23.7)	−16.9 (1.5)	−26.5 (−15.7)	−9.5 (14.8)
Mean minimum °C (°F)	−44.4 (−48.0)	−41.9 (−43.4)	−37.6 (−35.6)	−24.7 (−12.5)	−11.6 (11.2)	−1.6 (29.1)	3.6 (38.5)	2.1 (35.7)	−4.1 (24.6)	−15.8 (3.6)	−31.3 (−24.4)	−41.3 (−42.4)	−45.8 (−50.5)
Record low °C (°F)	−51 (−60)	−52 (−61)	−47 (−52)	−37 (−34)	−23 (−10)	−7 (20)	0 (32)	−3 (27)	−11 (12)	−32 (−25)	−42 (−44)	−47 (−53)	−52 (−61)
Average precipitation mm (inches)	34 (1.35)	23 (0.92)	22 (0.88)	15 (0.60)	28 (1.12)	65 (2.56)	92 (3.63)	62 (2.44)	49 (1.91)	33 (1.29)	37 (1.44)	23 (0.92)	483 (19.06)
Average snowfall cm (inches)	34 (13.5)	23 (9.2)	22 (8.8)	15 (5.8)	6.1 (2.4)	0.25 (0.1)	0.0 (0.0)	0.0 (0.0)	1.3 (0.5)	22 (8.8)	37 (14.4)	23 (9.2)	185 (72.7)
Source: XMACIS2 (normals, extremes & precip/snow)

== Demographics ==
In the 2021 Census of Population conducted by Statistics Canada, Brochet had a population of 64 living in 31 of its 31 total private dwellings, a change of −45.8% from its 2016 population of 118. With a land area of 2.76 km^{2} (1.07 sq mi), it had a population density of 23.2/km^{2} (60.1/sq mi) in 2021.

Adjoining Brochet is the territory of the Barren Lands First Nation, called Brochet 197. These two communities, Brochet 197 with 547 residents and Brochet with 146 residents, form a population centre of 693 people also called Brochet.

== See also ==
- Lac Brochet, Manitoba (a community on Lac Brochet north of Reindeer Lake)
