= Mary Jane McCallum =

Canadian Senator and dentist

The Honourable Mary Jane McCallum
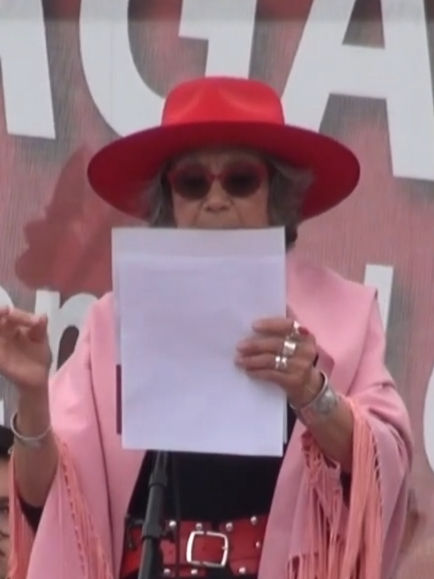
- Mary Jane McCallum in 2023

8th Chancellor of Brandon University
- Incumbent
- Assumed office July 1, 2021
- President: David Docherty

Canadian Senator from Manitoba
- Incumbent
- Assumed office December 4, 2017
- Nominated by: Justin Trudeau
- Appointed by: Julie Payette
- Preceded by: Janis Johnson

Personal details
- Born: May 1, 1952 (age 74) Barren Lands First Nation, Brochet, Manitoba, Canada
- Party: Conservative (2025-present)
- Other political affiliations: Non-affiliated (2022-2025); Independent Senators Group (2018-2022)
- Education: University of Manitoba (DMD)
- Occupation: Dentist

Mary Jane McCallum (born May 1, 1952) is a Canadian Senator representing Manitoba, appointed in 2017. She is the 8th Chancellor of Brandon University, a role she assumed in 2021, making her the first Indigenous woman to hold that post. A Cree woman, and a dentist by profession, McCallum has worked to provide dental and medical services to northern and Indigenous communities across Manitoba and Saskatchewan. As a survivor of the Canadian residential school system, she advocates for social justice, Indigenous rights, and decolonization, sharing her personal experiences to foster awareness and understanding.

== Early life and education ==
McCallum was born on May 1, 1952. She is a citizen of the Barren Lands First Nation in Brochet, Manitoba, and identifies as a Cree woman.

At age five, she was sent to the Guy Hill Indian Residential School in The Pas, Manitoba, where she remained for 11 years. She has described this period as traumatic, stating that her identity was reshaped around “shame, dependence, blind obedience and fear.” Before entering residential school, she described herself as “solid,” having grown up on her community’s trapline and fish camp, where she received a land-based education that grounded her in connection, spirituality, and purpose. She recalls winning first prize in a religion class for a description of hell, an experience that instilled a lasting fear.

McCallum has spoken about internalizing colonial beliefs promoted by figures such as John A. Macdonald, describing how she came to view Indigenous peoples as “savages; less than human” and how she worked to unlearn those messages. She has stated that she is “still on my reconciliation journey towards that child who first entered residential school,” and that the trauma has affected her children and grandchildren. She has described residential schools as institutions that “shattered the meaning of our lives and left death, disorder, disconnection and disempowerment.”

After leaving residential school, McCallum pursued post-secondary education in dentistry. She received a Dental Nursing Diploma from the Wascana Institute of Applied Arts and Sciences in Regina, Saskatchewan, in 1977, followed by a dental therapy diploma from the School of Dental Therapy in 1979. She completed a Doctor of Dental Medicine (DMD) degree at the University of Manitoba in 1990.

== Dental and health career ==
McCallum earned her Doctor of Dental Medicine (DMD) in 1990, becoming Canada’s first female Indigenous dentist.

=== Early career and shift in practice ===
- Practised for more than a decade using what she described as a “rigid, Westernized approach” focused on completing oral treatment plans.
- Determined that clinical treatment alone was not improving oral health outcomes in First Nations communities.
- Linked ongoing oral disease to “mental and spiritual pain, rooted in racism, trauma and loss inflicted by colonization”.
- Shifted to a holistic, patient-centred model informed by traditional teachings, focusing on each person’s goals for their own care.

=== Work in northern and Indigenous communities ===
- Provided dental and health services in northern Manitoba and Saskatchewan from 1979 to 1997, including as a dental therapist in remote communities.
- Served as an assistant professor at the University of Manitoba; managed a dental clinic in Churchill and supervised students during clinical practicum placements.
- Completed an interchange with the Assembly of Manitoba Chiefs as Regional Dental Officer for Manitoba (1996–2000).
- Worked in Brochet during two terms (1992–1996; 2003–2010), managing community programs in children’s dental health, diabetes and prenatal care.
- Volunteered on local housing, school and education committees, and organised monthly meetings with Elders to discuss community social issues.
- Contracted with the federal First Nations and Inuit Health Branch to provide services in northern Manitoba.
- Returned to the University of Manitoba in April 2002 to lead Aboriginal Dental Health Programs.

=== Advocacy and public health ===
- Became increasingly active as a community organiser and social-justice advocate.
- Argued that cavity-prevention programs are ineffective when basic needs such as “safety, warmth and food” are unmet.
- Advocated for addressing the social determinants of health—including housing, employment and education—to improve outcomes for First Nations, Inuit and Métis communities.
- Called for “decolonising frameworks like the health-care system and reclaiming traditional teachings”.
- Emphasised that Indigenous communities “have their own solutions” and must be supported in implementing them.

=== Retirement ===
- Retired from active dentistry in April 2021.
- Remains a non-practising member of the Manitoba Dental Association.

=== Chronology of major appointments and roles ===
Year	Role/Position	Organisation/Institution	Key detail/Significance
1977	Dental Nursing Diploma	Wascana Institute of Applied Arts and Sciences (now Saskatchewan Polytechnic)	
1979	Dental Therapy Diploma	School of Dental Therapy (now part of the First Nations University of Canada)	
1979–1997	Dental Therapist	Northern communities in Saskatchewan and Manitoba	
1990	Doctor of Dental Medicine (DMD)	University of Manitoba	First female Indigenous dentist in Canada
1992–1996	Community Health Programs Manager	Brochet	First term
1996–2000	Regional Dental Officer	Assembly of Manitoba Chiefs	
April 2002	Lead, Aboriginal Dental Health Programs	University of Manitoba	
2003–2010	Community Health Programs Manager	Brochet	Second term
4 December 2017	Senator from Manitoba	Senate of Canada	Appointed by Justin Trudeau
April 2021	Retired from active practice		Remains non-practising member of the Manitoba Dental Association
6 May 2021	8th Chancellor	Brandon University	First Indigenous woman and first female Chancellor
30 January 2024	Renewed for second term as Chancellor	Brandon University	

== Senate career ==
McCallum was appointed to the Senate of Canada by Prime Minister Justin Trudeau on 4 December 2017. She initially sat with the Independent Senators Group (2018–2022), later sat as a non-affiliated senator, and subsequently joined the Conservative caucus. She has served on the Standing Senate Committee on Indigenous Peoples.

McCallum frequently uses her platform in the Senate to highlight Indigenous experiences, share survivor testimony, and address systemic injustices in Canada. Selected interventions include:

- 26 September 2024: Delivered a tribute to Grand Chief Cathy Merrick on behalf of the Assembly of Manitoba Chiefs.
- 6 June 2024: Paid tribute to Senator Victor Oh, drawing parallels between the historical discrimination faced by Chinese Canadians and the ongoing struggles of First Nations.
- 31 October 2023: Extended a tribute to members of the Bangsamoro Transition Authority from the southern Philippines.
- 3 October 2023: Shared an excerpt from her speech, “A Life in Retrospect: Examining the Seven Generations of My Lived Experience,” focusing on her early childhood before residential school.
- 26 September 2023: Paid tribute to “grassroots people,” emphasizing resilience and community strength.
- 20 June 2023: Spoke on “Guy Hill Residential School Search and Resurgence as First Nations Sovereign Peoples,” reflecting on the formation of “families and lifelong friends” among residential school children.
- 14 December 2022: Collaborated with the Indigenous Women’s Collective to address “Indigenous Identity Fraud”.

McCallum has spoken publicly about experiencing racism on the Senate floor. She challenges residential school denialism, advocates for recognition of oppression and privilege, and calls for dismantling systemic racism, discrimination and violence rooted in the residential school system and its ongoing impacts. She has stated that she carries “all those voices with me when I go into the Senate Chamber” and that her aim is to “bring voice to First Nations concerns”.

== Chancellor of Brandon University ==
On 6 May 2021, McCallum was appointed the 8th Chancellor of Brandon University. She became both the first Indigenous woman and the first female Chancellor in the university’s history. Her initial term began on 1 July 2021. The Brandon University Senate renewed her chancellorship for a second term on 30 January 2024.

The role of Chancellor includes:

- Serving as the ceremonial head of Brandon University
- Advising and supporting the University President
- Membership on both the Board of Governors and the University Senate
- Providing leadership in fundraising and cultivating relations with donors
- Presiding over Convocation ceremonies and conferring degrees
- Representing the University at official events and ceremonial functions
- Serving as an ambassador for the University, promoting its mission and values

Upon her reappointment, Brandon University President Dr. David Docherty highlighted her “thoughtful guidance, her care, and her keen insight,” noting that her leadership “continues to inspire students, faculty, staff, and community supporters”.

McCallum has described her work as Chancellor as a “good journey” with the University’s students, faculty, and community.

== Advocacy and public engagement ==
McCallum is active in public education on the history and ongoing impacts of the Canadian Indian residential school system. She delivers workshops and presentations in which she shares her experience as a residential school survivor to foster understanding and awareness. Her writing on the subject includes the chapter “Bless Me Father for I Have Sinned,” published in First Lady Nation, Volume II: Stories by Aboriginal Women.

Her advocacy focuses on social justice, Indigenous rights, and decolonization. Drawing on her professional work in northern and remote communities, she has emphasized the role of systemic racism and colonial policies in shaping health outcomes for Indigenous peoples. She argues that improving health requires addressing the social determinants of health and decolonizing institutions such as the health-care system. A central principle of her approach is supporting Indigenous communities to define and implement their own solutions.

Through public statements and interventions in the Senate of Canada, McCallum has spoken on issues including racism, discrimination, and the ongoing impacts of colonialism on First Nations, Inuit, and Métis peoples.

== Personal life ==
Mary Jane McCallum is married, and has two daughters and a son.
