= Tadoule Lake Airport =

Airport in Manitoba, Canada

- IATA: XTL; ICAO: CYBQ; WMO: 71272

Summary
- Airport type: Public
- Operator: Government of Manitoba
- Location: Tadoule Lake, Manitoba
- Time zone: CST (UTC−06:00)
  - Summer (DST): CDT (UTC−05:00)
- Elevation AMSL: 921 ft / 281 m
- Coordinates: 58°42′22″N 098°30′44″W

Map
- Location in Manitoba CYBQ (Canada)

Runways
Direction	Length		Surface
Direction	ft	m	Surface
07/25	3,202	976	Crushed rock

Statistics (2010)
- Aircraft movements: 958
- Source: Canada Flight Supplement; Environment Canada; Movements from Statistics Canada

Tadoule Lake Airport (IATA: XTL, ICAO: CYBQ) is located 0.6 nautical miles (1.1 km; 0.69 mi) southwest of Tadoule Lake, Manitoba, Canada.

== Airlines and destinations ==
Airlines	Destinations
Perimeter Aviation	Lac Brochet, Thompson

== See also ==
- List of airports in Manitoba
