= Tadoule Lake =

Community in Manitoba, Canada

Coordinates: 58°42′43″N 98°28′49″W

Location of Tadoule Lake in Manitoba

Tadoule Lake (Chipewyan: ᕞᐡ ᗀᐅᐟᕄ ᕤᐧᐁ, T’es he úli túé) is an isolated northern community in Manitoba reachable by plane, snowmobile, dog team sleds, and in winter by winter road. In 1973, the Sayisi Dene moved here to return to their Barren-ground Caribou hunting life.

The name appears as Tos-da-ool-le in the T.B. Johnson report of 1890, and as Tas-da-ool-le on the Arrowsmith map of 1832. Of Chipewyan origin Tes-He-Olie Twe, it may be translated as "floating charcoal" for the floating cinders and burnt wood resulting from an early forest fire or "Ashes floating on the lake". The modern spelling has been in common usage since 1914.

The community is located on the northwest shore of Tadoule Lake by the Seal River and is centered within the winter range of the Qamiuriak Caribou Herd (barren-ground caribou). Tadoule Lake is served by Tadoule Lake Airport for air transportation and the Peter Yassie Memorial School for K-12 education.

The Sayisi Dene First Nation Relocation Settlement Trust has funded annual children's summer camps intended to promote literacy since 2016, which are well attended by the community.

In recent years, Tadoule Lake is exploring the possibility of youth wilderness expeditions for the community to explore the Seal River Watershed. The Sayisi Dene and neighbouring Inuit and Cree communities are attempting to establish the watershed in which Tadoule Lake is located in to become an Indigenous Protected Conservation Area.

During 2021 Western North America heat wave, on July 2 and 3, 2021, the record high temperature of 38.1 °C (100.6 °F) was registered.

== History ==
In 1969, some Duck Lake Dene began discussing the possibility of becoming self-reliant and returning to the ancestral lifestyle after the forced 1956 relocation of the Dene community originally at Little Duck Lake. A few families left Churchill and Dene Village to move to North Knife Lake in 1969. More would move from Churchill, this time to South Knife Lake in 1971.

In 1973, the Duck Lake Dene, North Knife Lake and South Knife Lake Dene moved north to Tadoule Lake.

Fred Bruemmer visited the community in 1977 as a Globe and Mail journalist and noted that Tadoule Lake had 58 log cabins built across an area of more than 1.5 kilometres and a welcoming community that hosted him for weeks.

By the 1990s, the Duck Lake Dene saw it could succeed in its new environment and changed their legal name from "Churchill, Band of Caribou-eater Chipewyan" to "Sayisi Dene First Nation (Tadoule Lake, Manitoba)".

In 2016, Indigenous and Northern Affairs Minister Carolyn Bennett attended a formal apology ceremony at Tadoule Lake, with the government awarding more than $33 million in compensation to the Sayisi Dene. Most of the money was put in trust for community development.

In recent years, concerns about drug smuggling and bootlegging have prompted the Manitoba Keewatinowi Okimakanak (MKO), an advocacy organization of 26 First Nations who are signatories to the Numbered Treaties with the Canadian government, to call for renewed efforts to addressing these issues in Tadoule Lake.

The community postal address and postal code for Tadoule Lake is: General Delivery, Tadoule Lake, Manitoba R0B 2C0.

== Demographics ==
The registered population of the Sayisi Dene First Nation living in Tadoule Lake as of February 2023 was 314, with an additional 586 members living off-reserve. The territory of Sayisi Dene consists of Churchill 1, IRI with 212.10 hectares and is governed by a Chief and three councillors. The Sayisi Dene are represented by the Keewatin Tribal Council, which represent eleven First Nations reserves in Northern Manitoba.

Canada census – Tadoule Lake community profile

	2011
Population	321 (-2.7% from 2006)
Land area	2.03 km^{2} (0.78 sq mi)
Population density	158.2/km^{2} (410/sq mi)
Median age	31.6 (M: 32.0, F: 31.3)
Private dwellings	141 (total)
Median household income

References: 2011

== See also ==
- Sayisi Dene
- Denesuline language
- Denesuline
