= Barren Lands First Nation =

Coordinates: 57°54′00″N 101°34′59″W

- Band No. 308
- ᑭᓯᐸᑲᒫᕽ kisipakamâhk
- People: Cree
- Treaty: Treaty 10
- Headquarters: Brochet
- Province: Manitoba

Land
- Other reserve: Brochet 197
- Land area: 43.72 km^{2} (16.88 sq mi)

Population (2021)
- On reserve: 456
- Off reserve: 739
- Total population: 1195

Government
- Chief: Michael Sewap

Tribal Council
- Keewatin Tribal Council

Barren Lands First Nation (Cree: ᑭᓯᐸᑲᒫᕽ, kisipakamâhk) is a First Nation located on the north shore of Reindeer Lake in northern Manitoba close to the Saskatchewan border. It has one reserve land called Brochet 197, which is 4,339.40 ha (10,722.9 acres) in size and adjoins the village of Brochet, Manitoba.

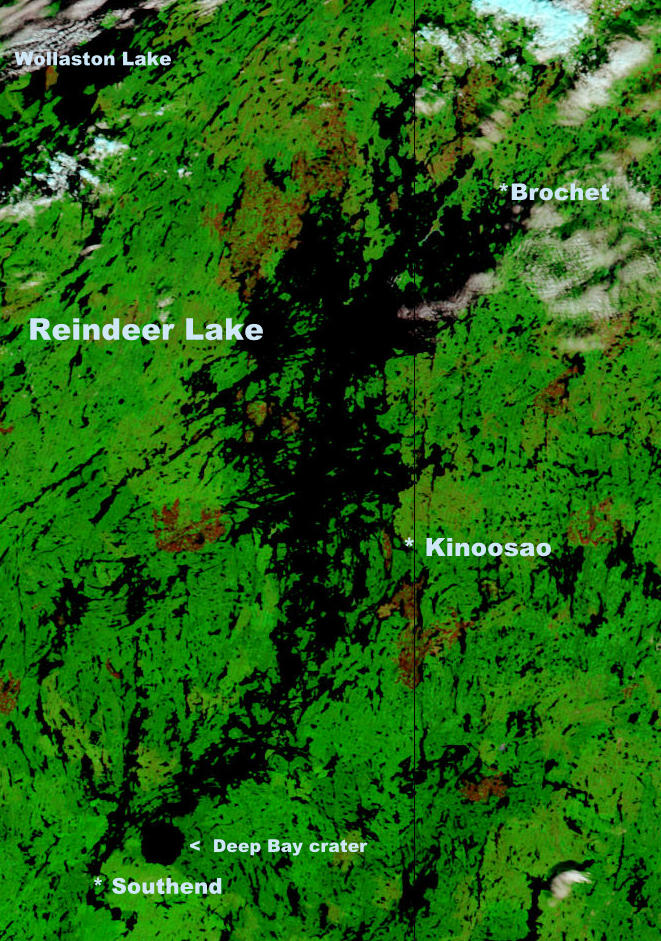
Location of Brochet and Brochet 197 on a NASA satellite map of Reindeer Lake

== Demographics ==
The population of Brochet 197 in 2011 was 547, a 78.8% increase from the 2006 population of 306. The median age was 20.9. Among its residents, 265 chose Cree as their mother tongue and 15 chose Dene. All but 10 spoke English.

The residents of the Brochet 197 reserve and the community of Brochet, itself with 146 residents, form a population centre of 693 people also called Brochet.

== Membership ==
As of February 2013, the total membership of Barren Lands First Nation was 1,075 with 455 members living on-reserve or on crown land and 620 members living off-reserve.

The First Nation is governed by a Chief and three councillors and is affiliated with the Keewatin Tribal Council. The Keewatin Tribal Council with its head office in Thompson represents eleven First Nations in Northern Manitoba.

== See also ==
- Brochet Airport
