= Brochet Airport =

Airport in Manitoba, Canada

- IATA: YBT; ICAO: CYBT

Summary
- Airport type: Public
- Operator: Manitoba Transportation and Infrastructure
- Location: Brochet, Manitoba
- Time zone: CST (UTC−06:00)
  - Summer (DST): CDT (UTC−05:00)
- Elevation AMSL: 1,131 ft (345 m)
- Coordinates: 57°53′22″N 101°40′45″W

Map
- Location in Manitoba CYBT (Canada)

Runways
Direction	Length		Surface
Direction	ft	m	Surface
03/21	3,511	1,070	Crushed rock

Statistics (2010)
- Aircraft movements: 958
- Source: Canada Flight Supplement; Movements from Statistics Canada

Brochet Airport (IATA: YBT, ICAO: CYBT) is located 1 nautical mile (1.9 km; 1.2 mi) west of Brochet, Manitoba, Canada. The airport is operated by Manitoba Transportation and Infrastructure through its Northern Airports program.

== Airlines and destinations ==
Airlines	Destinations
Perimeter Aviation	Thompson, Winnipeg

== See also ==
- List of airports in Manitoba
