= Northlands Denesuline First Nation =

Coordinates: 58°36′58″N 101°30′00″W

Northlands Denesuline First Nation ᓂ ᗂᘚ ᑌᓀ Nįh hots’į Dene
- People: Dene and Denesuline
- Headquarters: Lac Brochet, Manitoba

Government
- Chief: Simon Denechezhe

Tribal Council
- Keewatin Tribal Council

The Northlands Denesuline First Nation (Chipewyan: ᓂ ᗂᘚ ᑌᓀ, Nįh hots’į Dene) is a First Nations band government in northwestern Manitoba, Canada. This Dene or Denesuline population were part of a larger group once called the "Caribou-eaters".

The community of Lac Brochet or Dahlu T’ua(Chipewyan: ᑕᐤᕊ ᕤᐧᐁ, Dahlu T’ua) ('Jackfish Lake') is the administrative centre of the Northlands First Nation. Seven hundred and twenty residents of Lac Brochet reported Dene as their mother tongue in 2011.

== Territory ==
The territories of the First Nation include five parcels of land:

- Lac Brochet 197A — with 464.30 hectares (1,147.3 acres), contains the community of Lac Brochet
- Sheth Chok — with 1,213.60 hectares (2,998.9 acres)
- Thuycholeeni — with 47.50 hectares (117.4 acres)
- Thuycholeeni Aze — with 201 hectares (500 acres)
- Tthekale Nu — with 211 hectares (520 acres)

== Membership ==
As of February 2013 the total membership of Northland First Nation was 1,024 with 868 members living on-reserve and 156 members living off-reserve.

The First Nation is governed by a Chief and six councillors and is affiliated with the Keewatin Tribal Council. The Keewatin Tribal Council with its head office in Thompson represents eleven First Nations in Northern Manitoba.

== See also ==
- Denesuline language
- Denesuline
