= Sayisi Dene =

Dene Suline peoples in Manitoba, Canada

Sayisi Dene relocations in Manitoba

The Sayisi Dene ('People under the Sun' or 'People of the East', Chipewyan: ᓴᔨᓯ ᑌᓀ, Sayisi Dene) are Dene Suline peoples, a Dene group, living in northern Manitoba. They are members of the Sayisi Dene First Nation (formerly known as Churchill Indian Band), located at Tadoule Lake (58°42′43″N 98°28′50″W), and are notable for living a nomadic caribou-hunting and gathering existence. They are the most eastern of all the Dene peoples.

In 1956, the Sayisi Dene residing at Little Duck Lake (59°24′46.09″N 97°44′1.2″W) in northern Manitoba were relocated to Churchill. The relocation of the Sayisi Dene is viewed as one of the most grievous errors committed by the federal government.

== Origin ==
The Chipewyan's ancestral homeland stretched west from Hudson Bay, including the area that straddles northern Manitoba and the southern Northwest Territories, as well as northern Alberta and northern Saskatchewan. Chipewyan lived in bands. Some lived near the port of Churchill, Manitoba, by Hudson Bay. Others lived at North Knife River, north of Churchill. Other lived in the Barren Lands by Nueltin Lake. Still others ("Duck Lake Dene") established a semi-settled encampment at Little Duck Lake when European traders arrived, calling the former Hudson's Bay Company trading post "Caribou Post" as it was close to the caribou migration range.

== Little Duck Lake ==
While some Chipewyan bands chose to become fur trader and fur hunters in response to the Hudson's Bay Company's expansion to Churchill, Manitoba, the existence of Duck Lake Dene continued to be centered around hunting caribou whose migratory populations varied between decades. Canadian government officials caught note of a rumor that the caribou population was being over-hunted in the region between 1942 and 1955. Duck Lake Dene, called "Caribou-eater Chipewyan" by Europeans, were inaccurately blamed for the decline.

== Churchill re-location ==
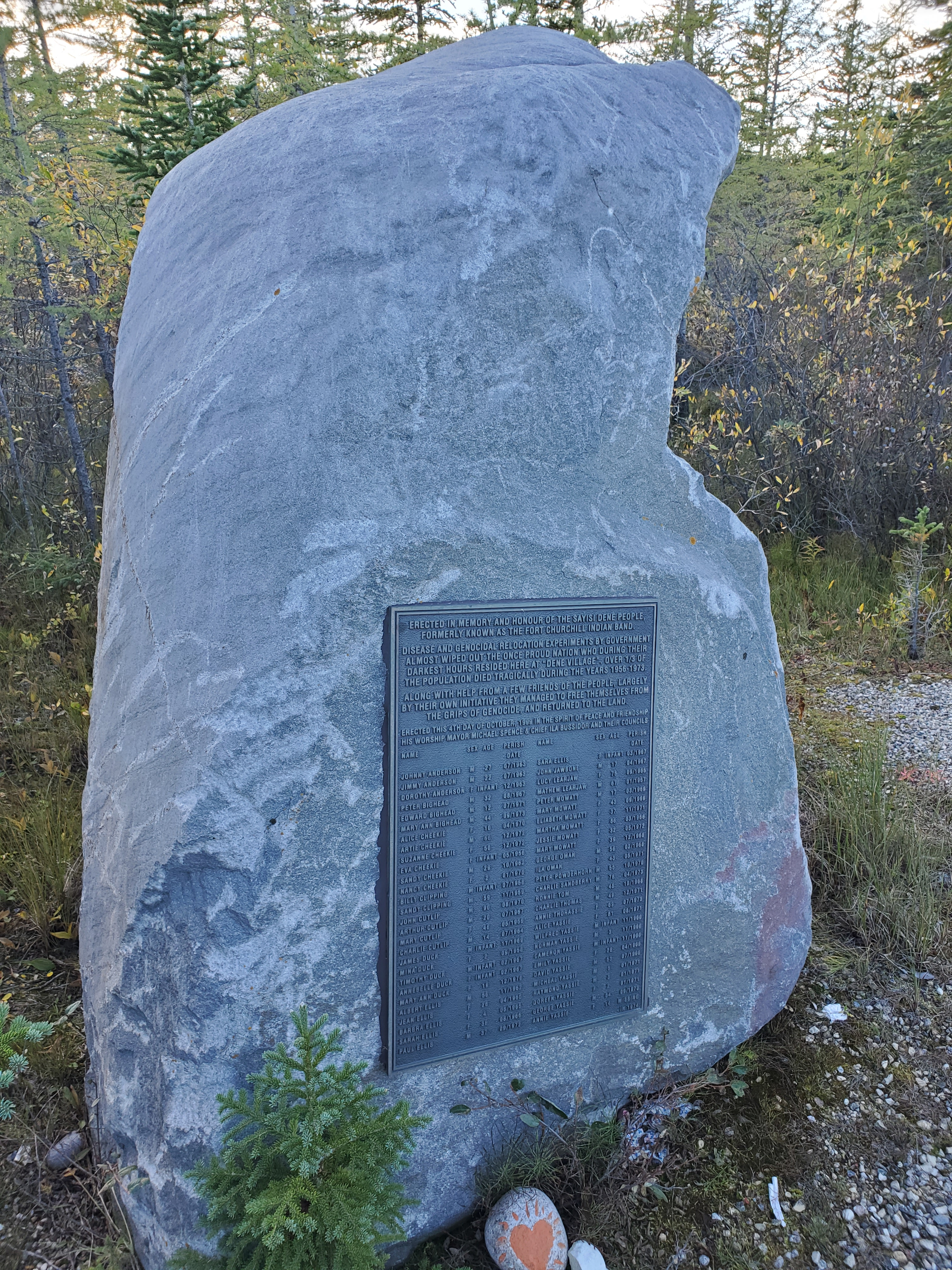
Cairn marking location of the 'Dene Village' near Churchill, Manitoba

In the mid 20th century, caribou dwindled from approximately 670,000 animals in 1942 to 277,000 animals by 1955. According to the Manitoba Government, the decision to relocate the Dene community at Duck Lake was due to incorrect assumptions from Manitoba wildlife officials about the impact of the Dene's traditional hunting practices on what was in fact a healthy herd. In addition the Hudson's Bay Company wished to close its nearby post which had served the band and was not as financially lucrative as it once was. In 1956 the Canadian and Manitoba governments decided to forcibly relocate the Duck Lake Dene away from caribou lands to Churchill, Manitoba. For two decades, the Little Duck Lake band, now a part of the "Churchill Band of Caribou-eater Chipewyan", lived in tents and shanties on the outskirts of town. Poverty and racism left the Sayisi Dene "destitute and desperate," according to the CBC.

Around 1967, the Canadian government developed a housing project for them called "Dene Village", Ottawa-designed homes that were incapable of dealing with the climate. The forced transition from a traditional nomadic caribou hunting economy to a non-migratory urban life was disastrous: nearly half of the "Churchill Chipewyan" population would die as a direct result of the relocation to Churchill.

== Tadoule Lake re-location ==
In 1969, some Duck Lake Dene began discussing the possibility of becoming self-reliant and returning to the ancestral life-style. A few families left and moved to North Knife Lake in 1969. A few more families moved from Churchill, this time to South Knife Lake in 1971. In 1973, the Duck Lake Dene, North Knife Lake and South Knife Lake Dene moved north and set up a new community at Tadoule Lake (pronounced Ta-doo-lee, derived from the Dene ts'eouli, translated as "floating ashes"). The Tadoule Lake settlement is one of the most northern and isolated settlements in Manitoba, reachable only by plane, dog team, snowmobile or canoe. The nearest rail link is back in Churchill, 250 kilometres away. The settlement is located by the underdeveloped, wild, and rugged Seal River, about 80 km. south of the treeline, and centered within the winter range of the Qaminuriak Caribou Herd (barren-ground caribou). The Sayisi, with a population of around 360 people, have found it difficult, but not impossible, to return to ancestrally traditional hunting and trapping ways. They deal with spousal, drug and alcohol abuse. But by the 1990s, the Duck Lake Dene saw it could succeed in its new environment and changed its legal name from "Churchill, Band of Caribou-eater Chipewyan" to "Sayisi Dene First Nation (Tadoule Lake, Manitoba)".

Ila Bussidor, Chief of the "Sayisi Dene First Nation (Tadoule Lake, Manitoba)", co-authored a 1997 book entitled, Night Spirits, The Story of the Relocation of the Sayisi Dene a chronicle of the band's ordeal from Little Duck Lake to Churchill to Tadoule Lake. Bussidor is currently working on a land claim settlement on behalf of her people, in addition to working with other First Nations on public works and community management projects. On August 2, 2010 Manitoba promised 13,000+ acres of Crown land, aside from any other treaty land entitlement, to compensate for the effects of the relocation. But, she (Ila Bussidor, Chief of the Sayisi Dene) says in this book: for my people, the impact of the relocation had the same effect as genocide.

== Federal government apology ==
On August 16, 2016, Carolyn Bennett, the Minister of Indigenous and Northern Affairs, offered an apology to the Sayisi Dene people for their forced relocation from Little Duck Lake to Churchill, MB in 1956. $33.6 million has been offered in compensation. Promises of support for the relocated people never materialized and subsequently, 117 of the 250 had died by the time the government moved to relocate them in 1973.

== Language ==
Sayisi Dene speak the Dene Suline language, of the Athabaskan linguistic group. Teaching their language to children and young adults who became English language speakers in Churchill is a priority. Elder Betsy Anderson said:

Yanízį Denesųłiné chu tįch’adíe įłághe yati hot’a ʔełnedárení hél tth’i ʔełedárí tth’agh nisnį.

Translation:

There was a time when all the people and all the animals understood each other and spoke the same language.
