= Lac Brochet, Manitoba =

Lac Brochet 197A ᑕᐤᕊ ᕤᐧᐁ Dahlu T’ua
- Indian reserve
- Location within Manitoba Location within Canada
- Coordinates: 58°36′58″N 101°30′00″W
- Country: Canada
- Province: Manitoba
- Region: Northern

Area (reserve), (community)
  - Total: 50.211 km^{2} (19.387 sq mi)
  - Land: 4.99 km^{2} (1.93 sq mi)
- Total refers to the reserve and land to the community
- Elevation (airport): 369 m (1,211 ft)

Population (2016) (community)
  - Total: 728
  - Density: 146/km^{2} (380/sq mi)
- Postal code: R0B 2E0

Lac Brochet 197A (Chipewyan: ᑕᐤᕊ ᕤᐧᐁ, Dahlu T’ua) is a Dene Indian reserve of the Northlands Denesuline First Nation, located in the boreal forest of northern Manitoba, Canada. It is situated on the north shore of Lac Brochet, located 240 km (150 mi) northwest of the city of Thompson.

The reserve contains the unincorporated community of Lac Brochet (58°37′12″N 101°29′02″W), which is the administrative centre of the Northlands Denesuline First Nation. There are no permanent roads connecting Lac Brochet with other parts of Manitoba (there are some that are passable only during the winter). Many residents travel using the Lac Brochet Airport located near town.

Petit Casimir Memorial School is the K-12 school in the community.

== Northlands Denesuline First Nation ==
The Lac Brochet community is the administrative centre of the Northlands Denesuline First Nation.

As of September 2021, the total membership of Northland Denesuline First Nation was 1,153 with 975 members living on-reserve and 173 members living off-reserve. The First Nation is governed by a Chief and six councillors and is affiliated with the Keewatin Tribal Council. The Keewatin Tribal Council with its head office in Thompson represents eleven First Nations in Northern Manitoba.

== Demographics ==
In the 2016 Canadian Census 530 residents of Lac Brochet chose Dene as their mother tongue and 5 chose Cree as their first language. English was spoken by most of the population.

Canada census – Lac Brochet 197A community profile

	2021	2016	2011
Population	641 (-12.0% from 2016)	728 (-10.8% from 2011)	816 (+35.1% from 2006)
Land area	4.49 km^{2} (1.73 sq mi)	4.99 km^{2} (1.93 sq mi)	4.99 km^{2} (1.93 sq mi)
Population density	142.9/km^{2} (370/sq mi)	146/km^{2} (380/sq mi)	163.7/km^{2} (424/sq mi)
Median age	27.4 (M: 27.8, F: 26.2)	26.1 (M: 27.9, F: 24.6)	22.8 (M: 23.2, F: 21.9)
Private dwellings	194 (total) 162 (occupied)	178 (total)	194 (total)
Median household income	$61,200

References: 2021 2016 2011

== Transport ==
Lac Brochet Airport (IATA: XLB, ICAO: CZWH) is a small airport located 1 nautical mile (1.9 km; 1.2 mi) east of the community. It serves as a gateway to the region, offering flights to Thompson and other destinations. The airport is equipped with various services, including car rentals, hotels, and a terminal with maps and diagrams for travellers.
