= Cleo Carlyle =

American baseball player (1902–1967)

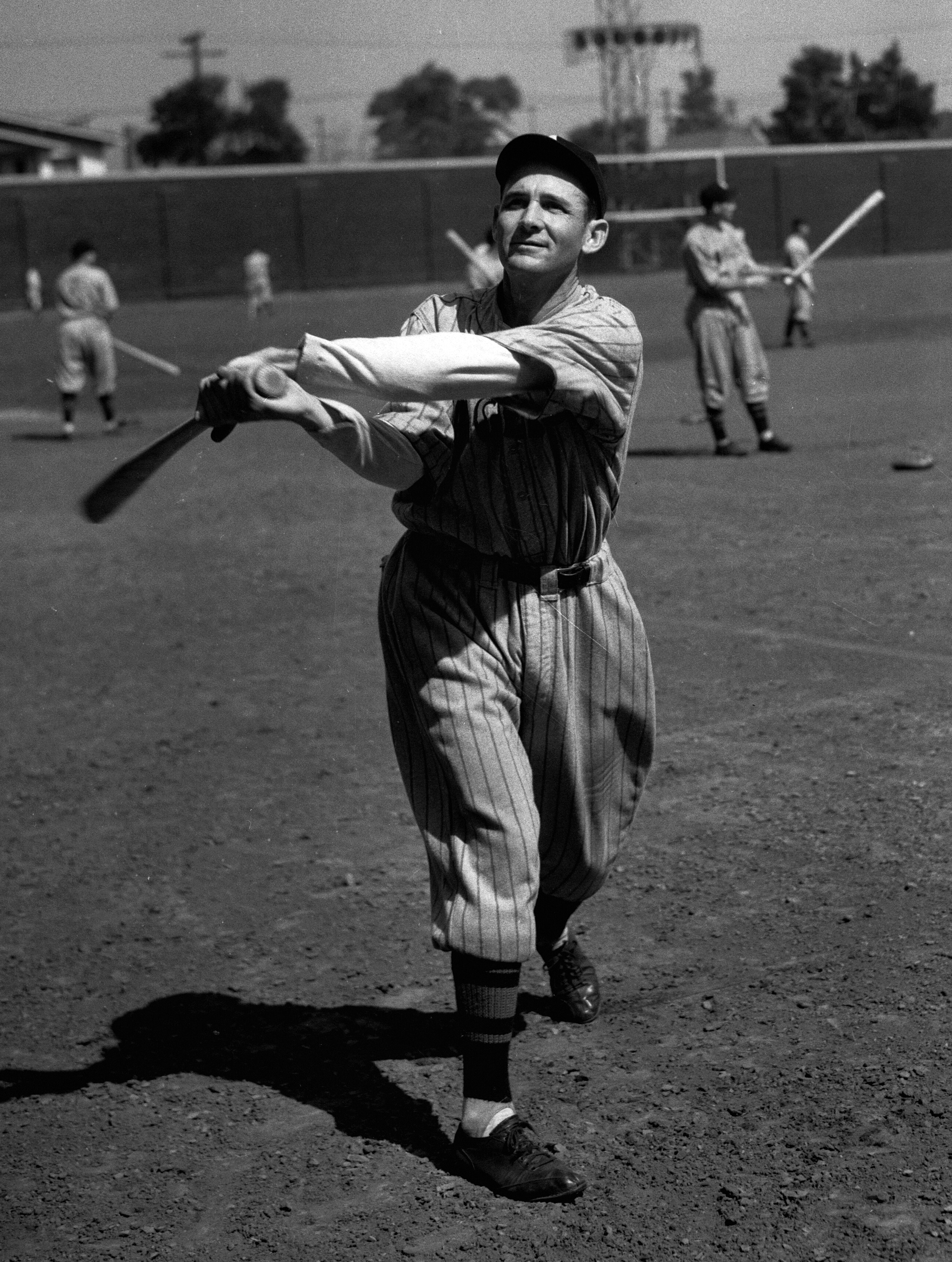
- Outfielder
- Born: September 7, 1902; Fairburn, Georgia, U.S.
- Died: November 12, 1967 (aged 65); Los Angeles, California, U.S.
- Batted: Left Threw: Right

MLB debut
- May 16, 1927, for the Boston Red Sox

Last MLB appearance
- October 1, 1927, for the Boston Red Sox

MLB statistics
- Batting average: .234
- Home runs: 1
- Runs batted in: 28
- Stats at Baseball Reference

Teams
- Boston Red Sox (1927)

Hiram Cleo Carlyle (September 7, 1902 – November 12, 1967) was an American outfielder in Major League Baseball who played for the Boston Red Sox during the 1927 season. Listed at 6 ft 0 in (1.83 m), 170 lb., Carlyle batted left-handed and threw right-handed. He was born in Fairburn, Georgia.

Carlyle began his professional career in 1924 with the Charlotte Hornets of the South Atlantic League. After playing the next two seasons with the Toronto Maple Leafs, he was acquired by the Red Sox. His older brother, Roy Carlyle, had played for the Red Sox the previous season. In 95 games with the Red Sox, Carlyle was a .234 hitter (111-for-474) with one home run and 48 RBI, including 53 runs, 20 doubles, eight triples, and seven stolen bases. He was primarily a corner outfielder, playing only 3 games as a center fielder.

In 1928, Carlyle went out west to play for the Hollywood Stars of the Pacific Coast League. He played for the Stars until 1934, when he finished the season with the Newark Bears of the International League. He returned to the PCL in 1935 with the Los Angeles Angels, for whom he played three seasons. He spent 1938 with the New Orleans Pelicans, and split the 1939 season between the Tulsa Oilers and San Diego Padres before retiring at age 37.

Carlyle died in Los Angeles, at the age of 65.

== Sources ==
- Career statistics from Baseball Reference, or Baseball Reference (Minors)
