= Roy Carlyle =

American baseball player (1900–1956)

- Outfielder
- Born: December 10, 1900; Buford, Georgia, U.S.
- Died: November 22, 1956 (aged 55); Norcross, Georgia, U.S.
- Batted: Left Threw: Right

MLB debut
- April 16, 1925, for the Washington Senators

Last MLB appearance
- September 13, 1926, for the New York Yankees

MLB statistics
- Batting average: .312
- Home runs: 9
- Runs batted in: 76
- Stats at Baseball Reference

Teams
- Washington Senators (1925); Boston Red Sox (1925–1926); New York Yankees (1926)

Roy Edward Carlyle (December 10, 1900 – November 22, 1956) was an American outfielder in Major League Baseball who played between 1925 and 1926 for the Washington Senators (1925), Boston Red Sox (1925–26) and New York Yankees (1926). Carlyle batted left-handed and threw right-handed. He was born in Buford, Georgia.

In a two-season career, Carlyle was a .312 hitter (157-for-504) with nine home runs and 76 runs batted in in 174 games, including 61 runs, 31 doubles, six triples, and one stolen base. He hit for the cycle on July 21, 1925, while with the Red Sox.

Roy's younger brother, Cleo Carlyle, was also an outfielder. He played for the Red Sox in 1927, the year after Roy left the team.

Carlyle died in Norcross, Georgia, at the age of 55.

== See also ==
- List of Major League Baseball players to hit for the cycle

Achievements
Preceded by Max Carey	Hitting for the cycle July 21, 1925	Succeeded by Bob Fothergill
