= List of Major League Baseball players to hit for the cycle =

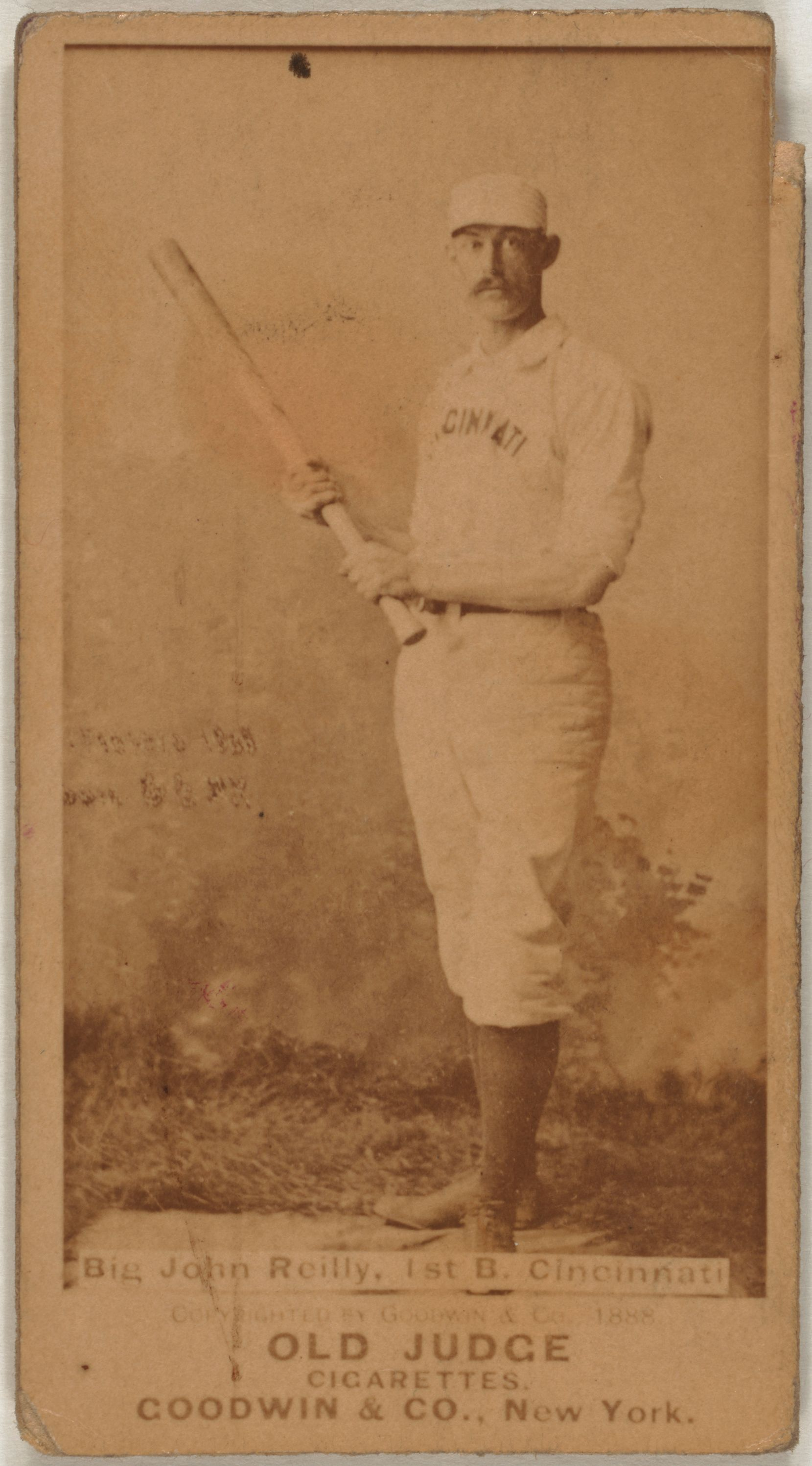
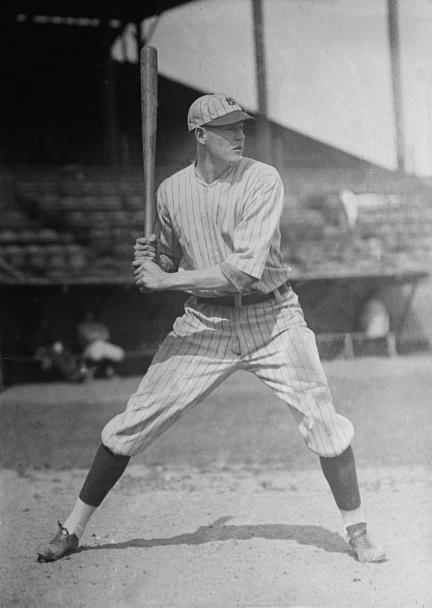
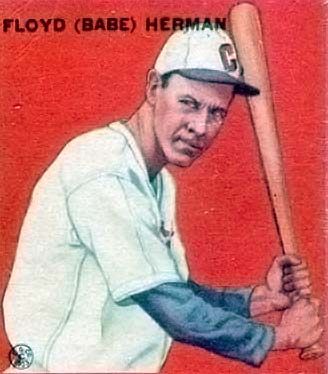
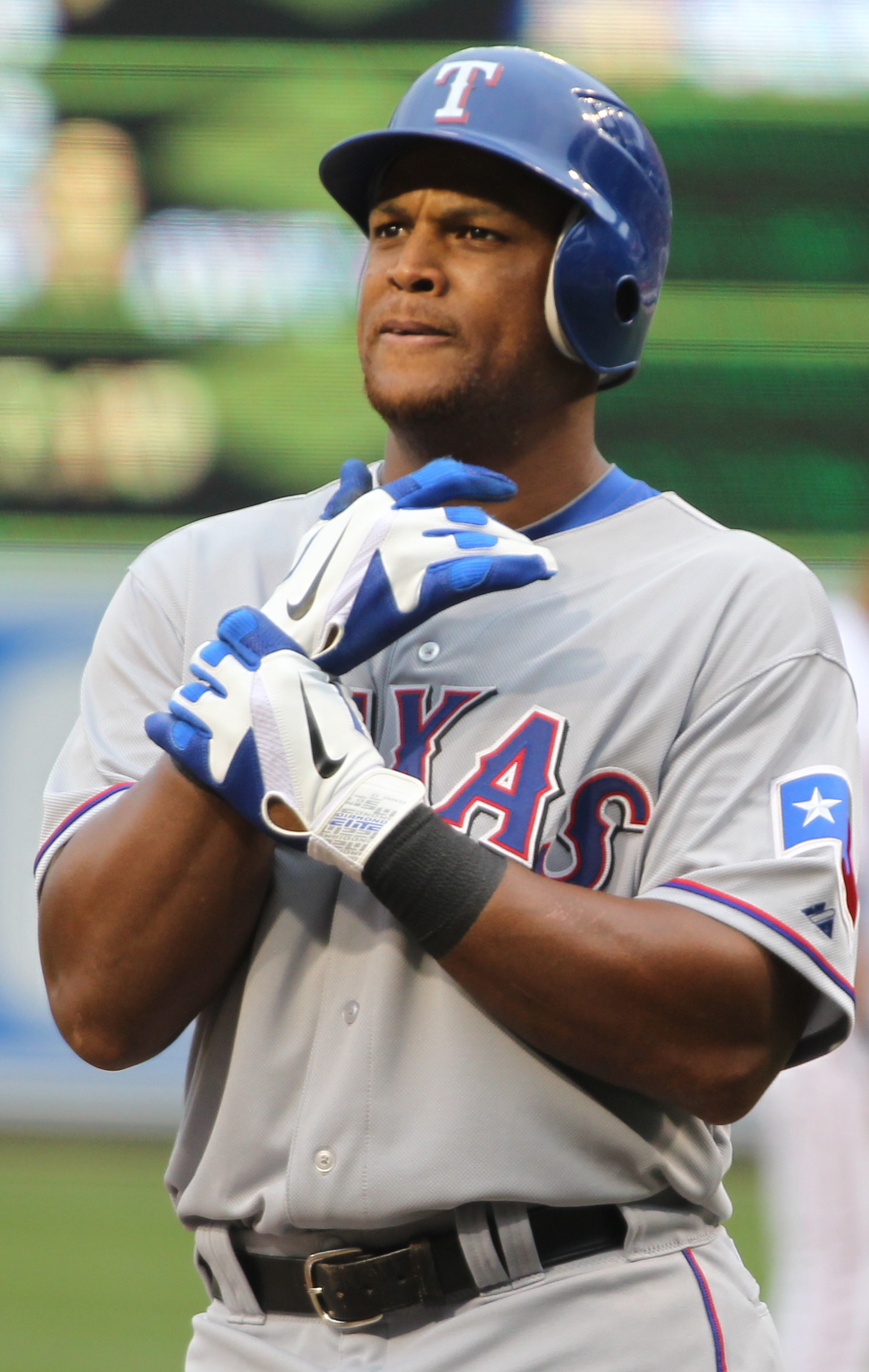
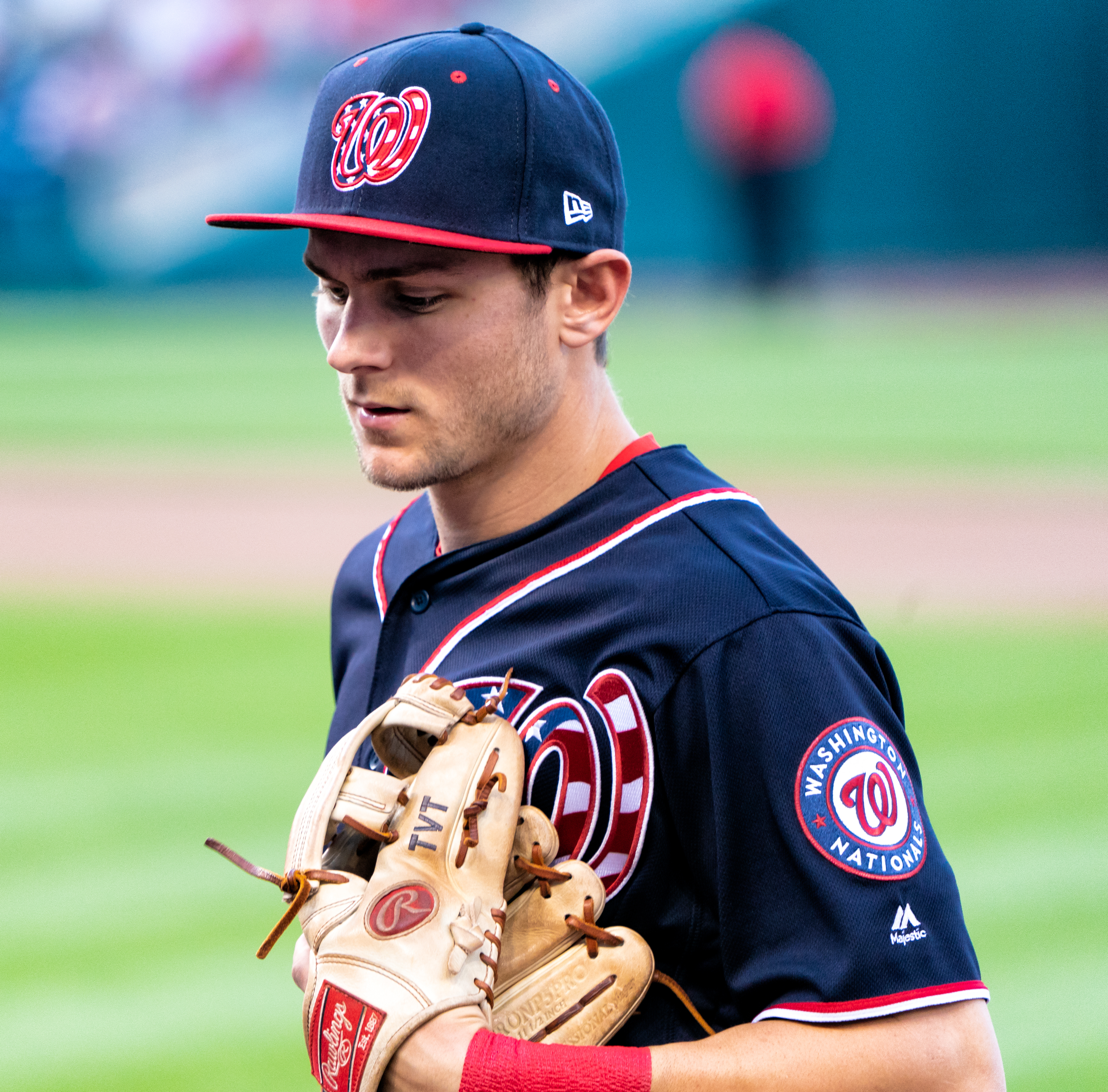
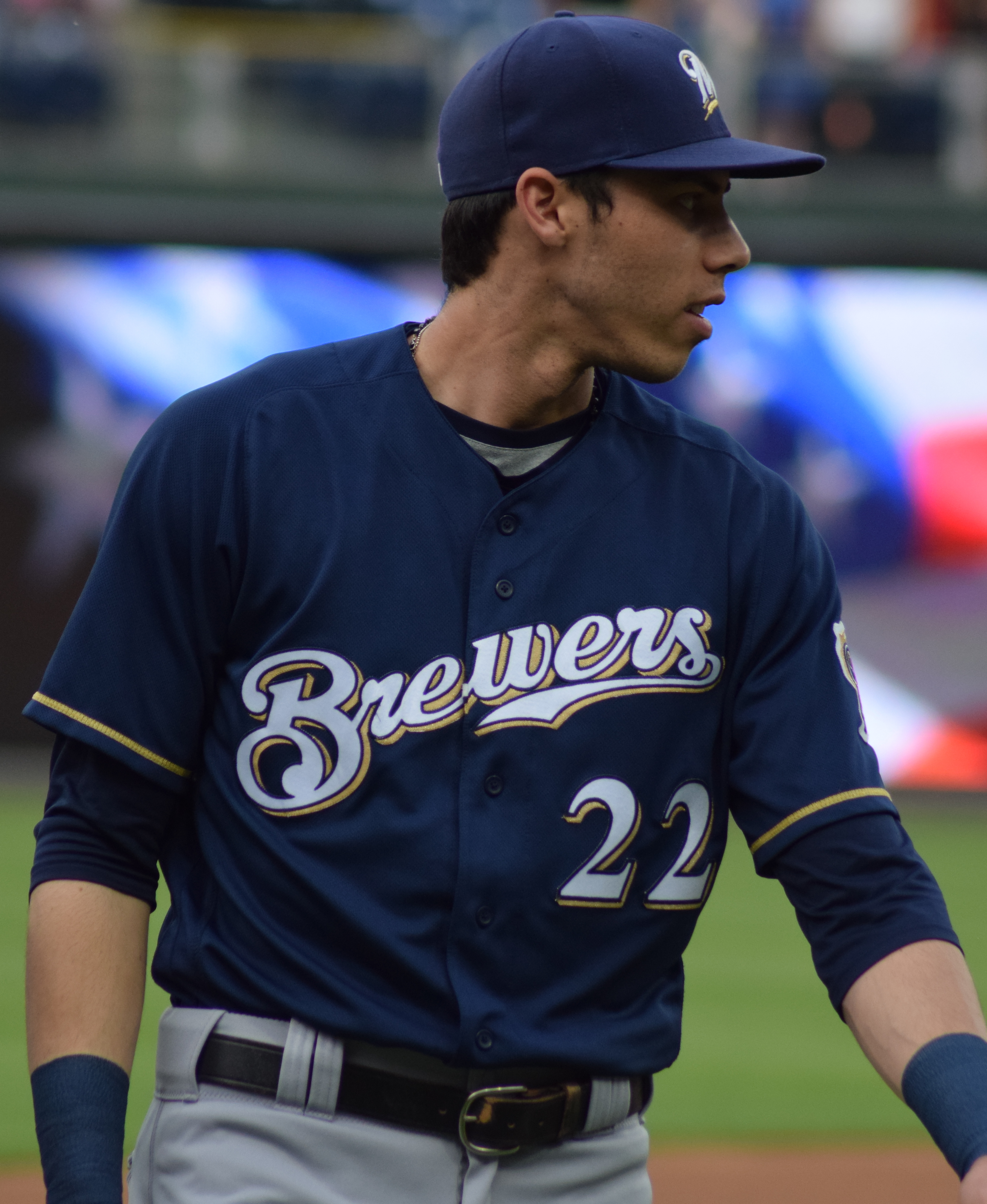
John Reilly, Bob Meusel, Babe Herman, Adrián Beltré, Trea Turner, and Christian Yelich (left to right) are the only MLB players to hit for the cycle three times in their careers.

Hitting for the cycle is the accomplishment in the sport of baseball of hitting a single, a double, a triple, and a home run in the same game. This article lists each player recognized by Major League Baseball (MLB) as having accomplished the feat.

The cycle itself is semi-rare in the major leagues, as Major League Baseball recognizes a total of 353 cycles, starting with Curry Foley in 1882, 144 years ago, through JJ Bleday on August 22, 2026. A large majority of cycles have been completed by players of National League and American League teams; however, Major League Baseball also recognizes 18 cycles completed by players in the American Association of the late 19th century, one cycle completed by a player of the Federal League of 1914–1915, and one cycle by a player in the Players' League of 1890. In terms of frequency, the cycle is roughly as common as a no-hitter; Baseball Digest calls it "one of the rarest feats in baseball".

Collecting the hits in the listed order is known as a "natural cycle", while collecting the hits in the reverse order is known as a "reverse natural cycle". A natural cycle has been completed 14 times in the modern era (after 1900), most recently by Gary Matthews Jr. of the Texas Rangers in 2006. A reverse natural cycle has been completed nine times in the modern era, most recently by Pete Crow-Armstrong of the Chicago Cubs in 2026.

== Notable accomplishments ==
The most cycles hit by a single player in MLB is three, accomplished by six players; John Reilly was the first to hit a third when he completed the cycle on August 6, 1890, after hitting his first two in a week (September 12 and 19, 1883) for the Cincinnati Reds. Bob Meusel became the second man to complete three cycles, playing for the New York Yankees; his first occurred on May 7, 1921, the next on July 3, 1922, and his final cycle on July 26, 1928. Babe Herman accomplished the feat for two different teams—the Brooklyn Robins (May 18 and July 24, 1931) and the Chicago Cubs (September 30, 1933). Adrián Beltré cycled first for the Seattle Mariners (September 1, 2008) before cycling twice as a member of the Texas Rangers (August 24, 2012 and August 3, 2015). Beltré is the only player to have completed all three cycles in the same ballpark, with the first occurring as an opponent of the Texas Rangers at Globe Life Park in Arlington. Trea Turner hit his third career cycle on June 30, 2021, against the Tampa Bay Rays; his first two cycles were hit against the Colorado Rockies. Christian Yelich hit his third cycle on May 11, 2022, against the Cincinnati Reds, becoming the first player to have all three cycles come against one team.

The most cycles hit in a single major league season is eight, which has occurred twice: first in the 1933 season, and then again in the 2009 season; all eight cycles in each of those seasons were hit by different players. Cycles have occurred on the same day twice in MLB history: on September 17, 1920, hit by Bobby Veach of the Detroit Tigers and George Burns of the New York Giants; and again on September 1, 2008, when the Arizona Diamondbacks' Stephen Drew and the Seattle Mariners' Adrián Beltré each completed the four-hit group. Conversely, the longest period of time between two players hitting for the cycle was five years, one month, and ten days, a drought lasting from Bill Joyce's cycle in 1896 to Harry Davis' in 1901. Three players—John Olerud, Bob Watson and Michael Cuddyer—have hit for the cycle in both the National and American Leagues. Three family pairs have hit for the cycle: father and son Gary and Daryle Ward, who accomplished the feat in 1980 and 2004, respectively; grandfather and grandson Gus and David Bell, in 1951 and 2004; and father and son Craig and Cavan Biggio, in 2002 and 2019.

Mel Ott and Dave Winfield are the youngest and oldest players to hit for the cycle, at ages 20 and 39, respectively. Of multiple-cycle hitters, John Reilly holds the record for the shortest time between cycles (seven days), while Aaron Hill holds the record since the formation of the American League, with his two 2012 feats coming within an 11-day span. Conversely, George Brett's two cycles came 11 years and 58 days apart. Christian Yelich is the only player to hit for the cycle twice in one season against the same team, doing so 20 days apart against the Cincinnati Reds in 2018. On October 8, 2018, Brock Holt of the Boston Red Sox hit for the cycle against the New York Yankees in Game 3 of the American League Division Series; it was the first cycle in MLB postseason history. In a regular-season game on September 19, 2021, Eddie Rosario of the Atlanta Braves collected his cycle on just five pitches, the smallest number since at least 1900.

== Cycles by player ==
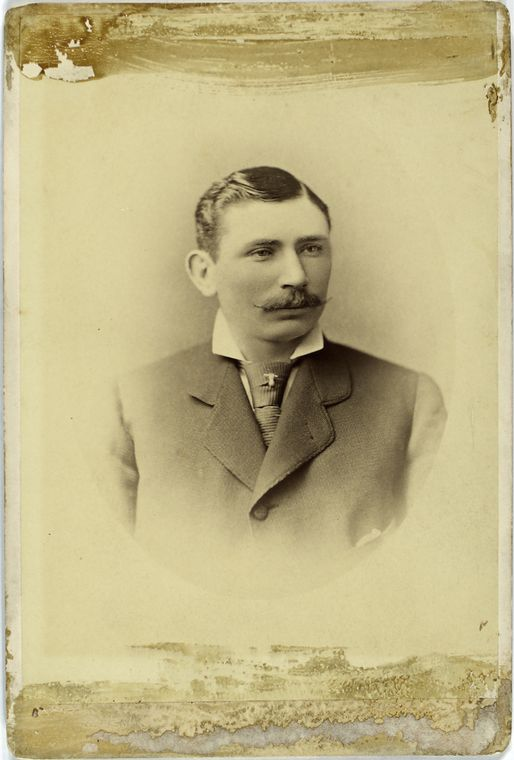
Curry Foley was the first player in Major League Baseball history to hit for the cycle.

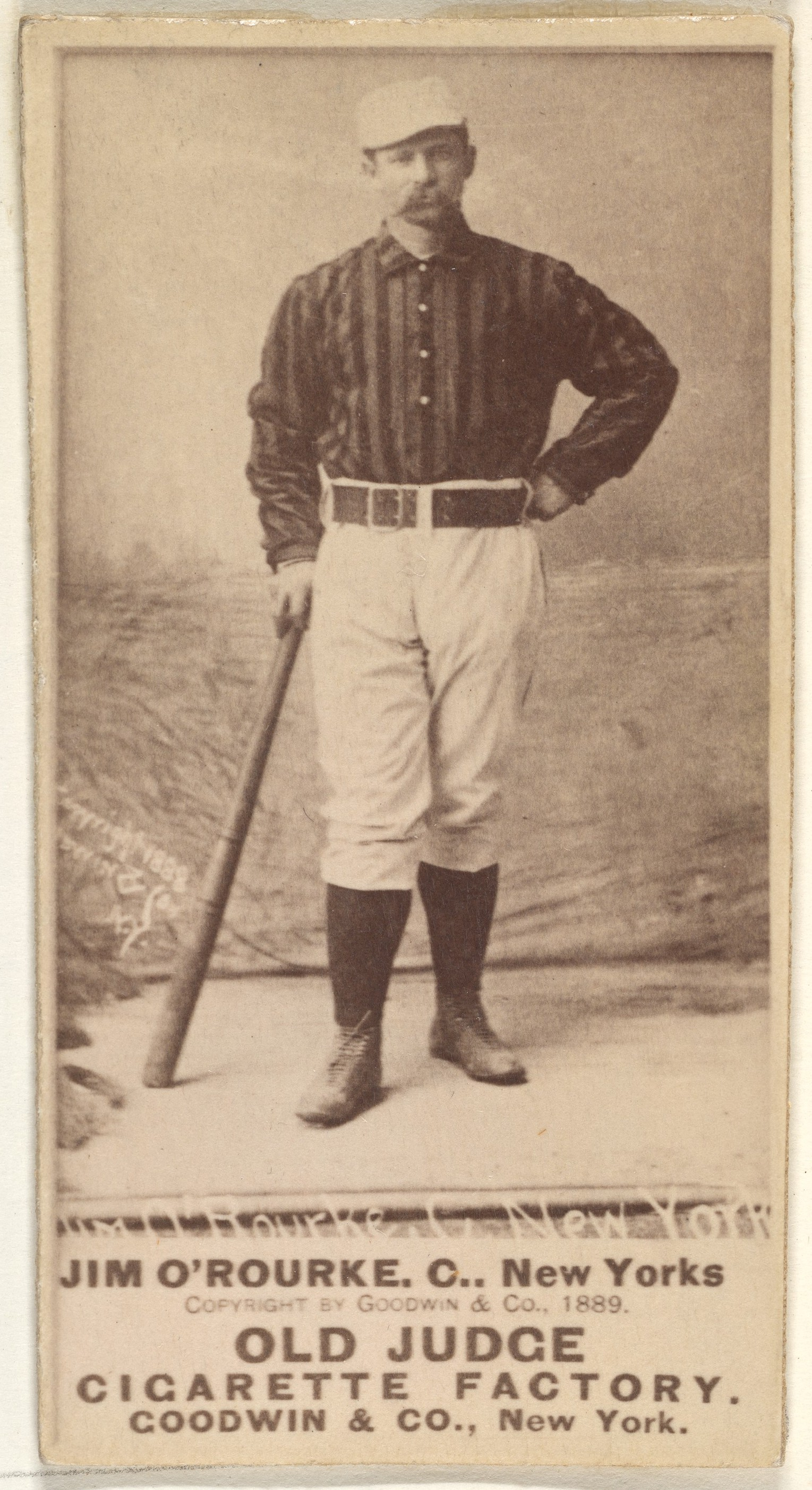
Jim O'Rourke is the earliest cycle hitter to be elected to the Baseball Hall of Fame.

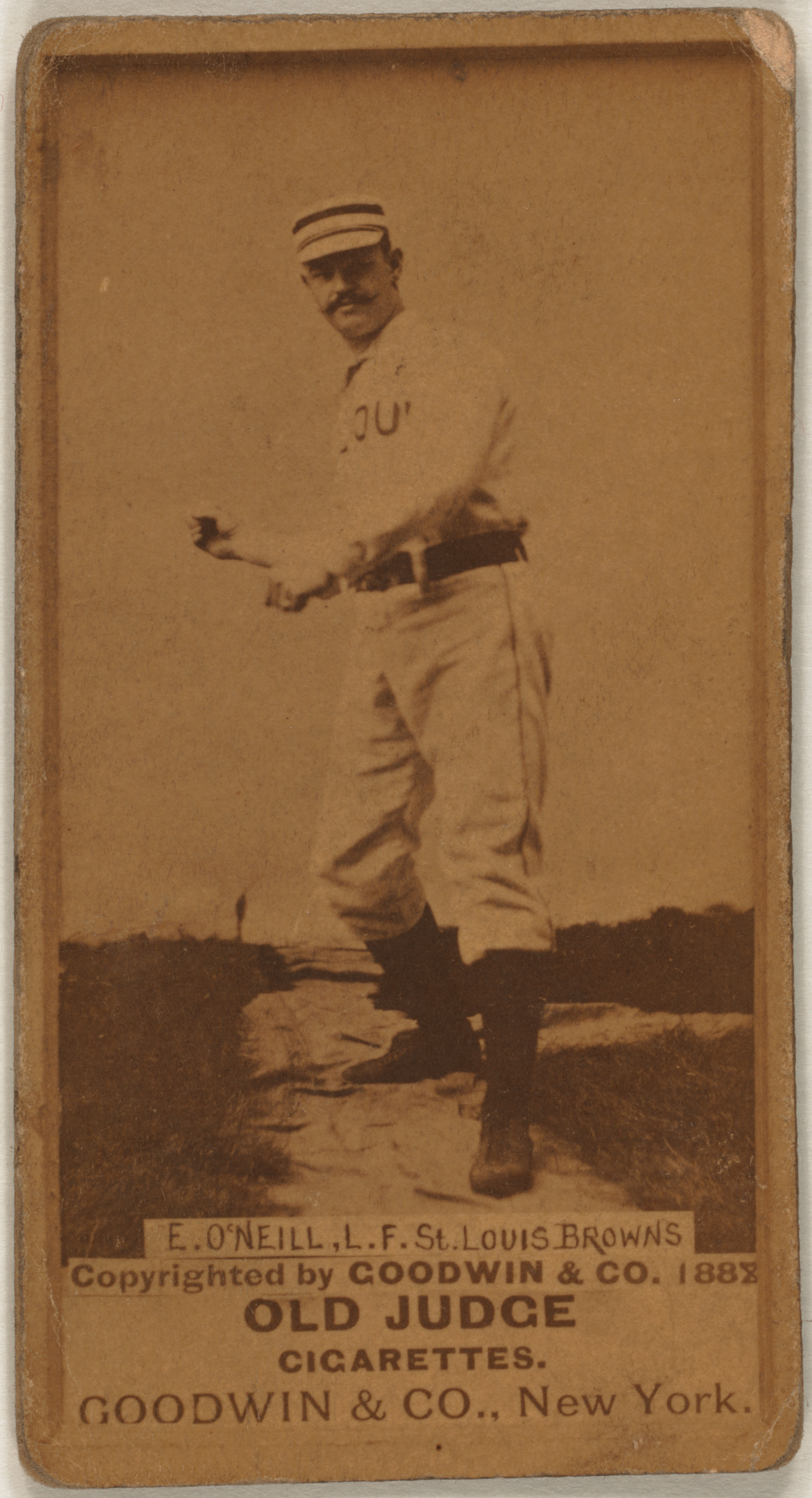
On May 7, 1887, Tip O'Neill became the second player to hit multiple cycles.

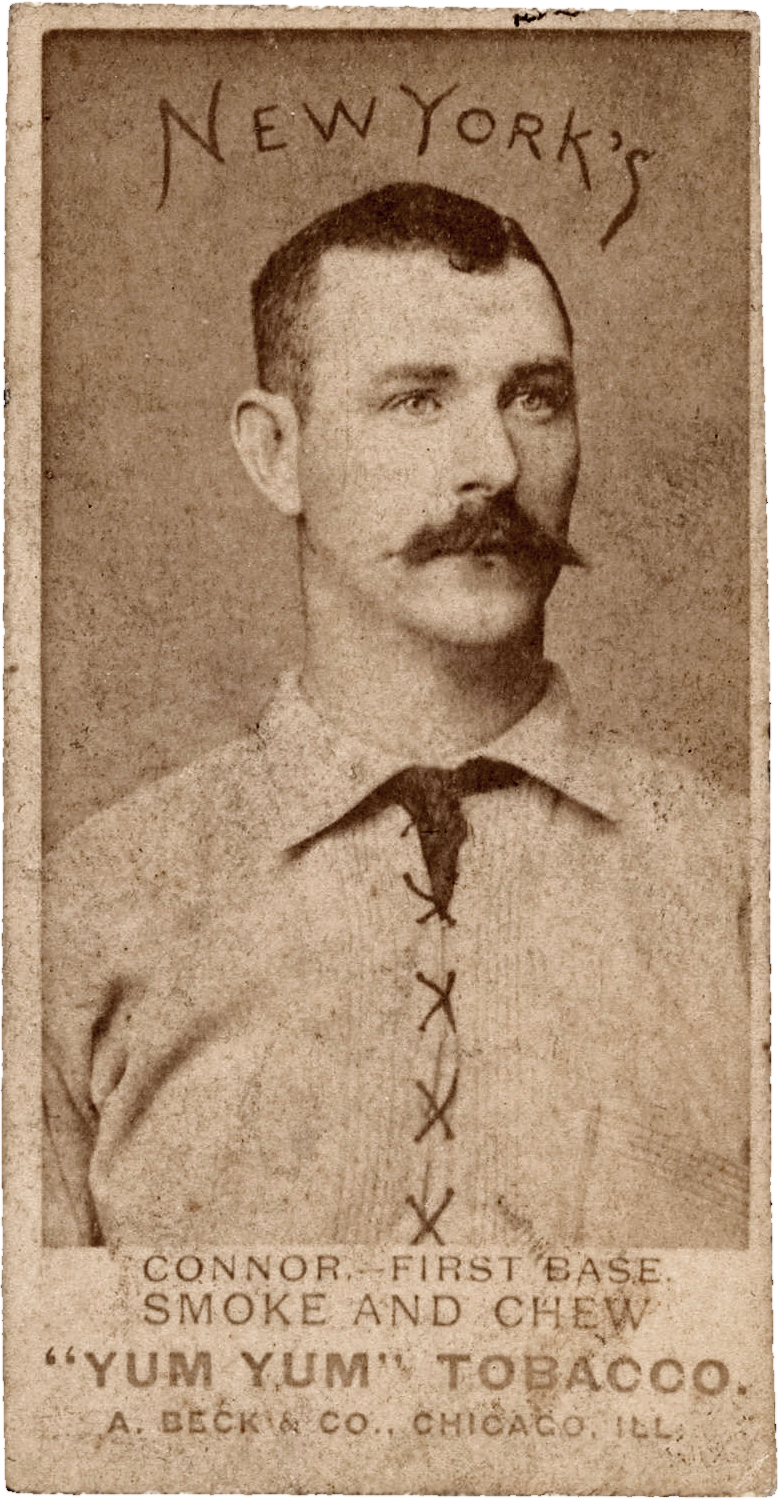
Hall of Famer Roger Connor hit his only cycle in the Players' League.

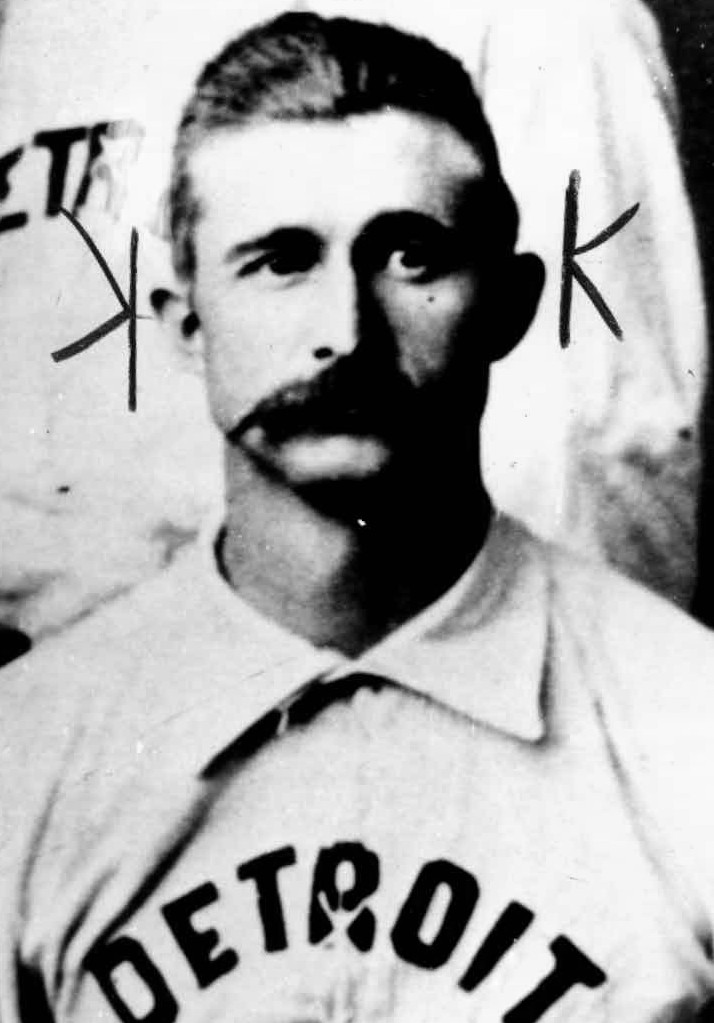
In 1894, the triple of Sam Thompson's cycle was 1 of his 28 that year, setting the Philadelphia Phillies' single-season franchise record.

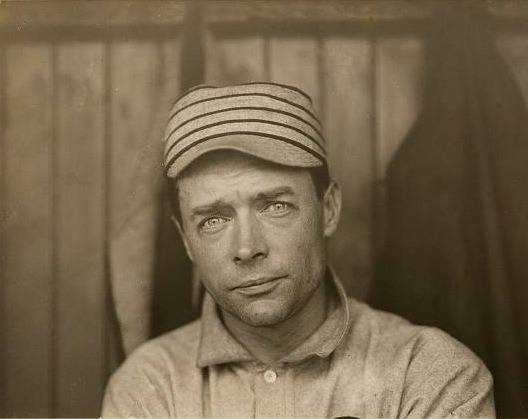
Harry Davis hit the first cycle in American League history, in 1901 for the Philadelphia Athletics.

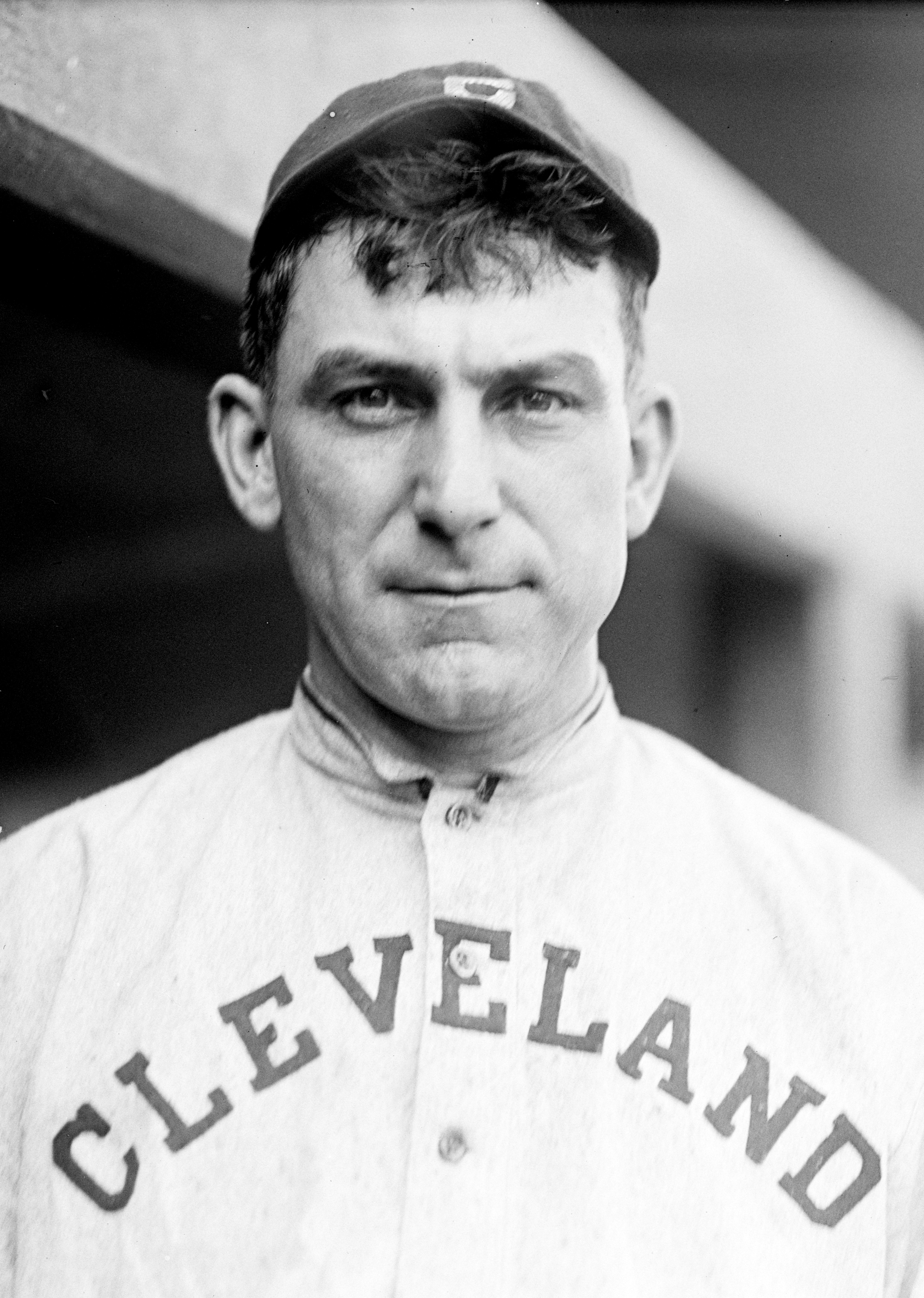
Hall of Famer Nap Lajoie hit his cycle on July 30, 1901.

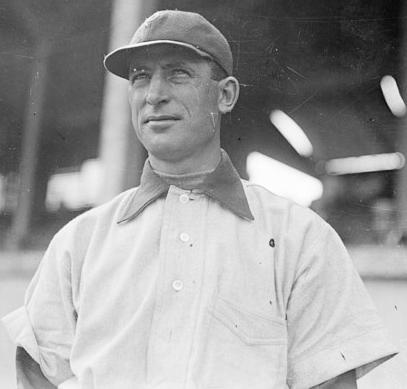
Fred Clarke was the first eventual Hall of Famer to hit multiple cycles.

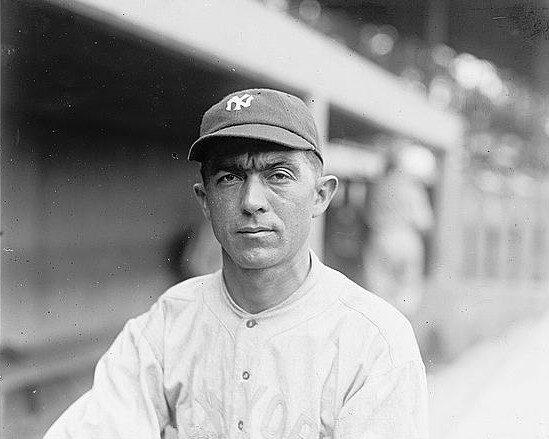
Frank "Home Run" Baker's cycle came against the New York Highlanders in 1911, the only cycle that season.

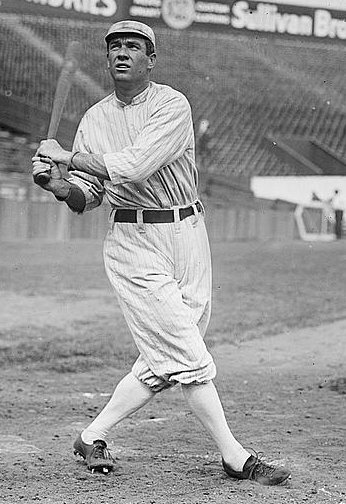
Baker's cycle was followed the next season by Tris Speaker's, playing for the Boston Red Sox.

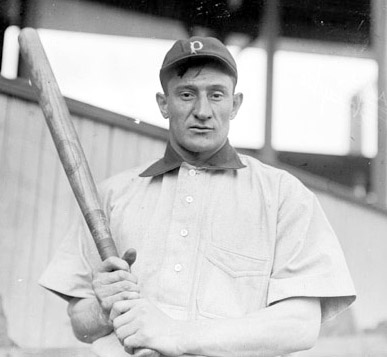
Honus Wagner's cycle was the last of the 1912 season.

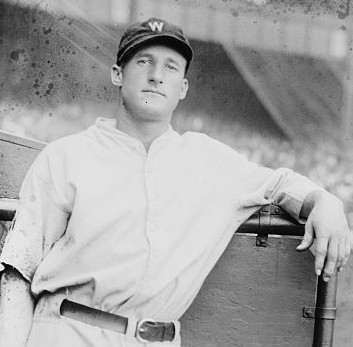
Goose Goslin hit for the cycle on August 28, 1924, for the Washington Senators.

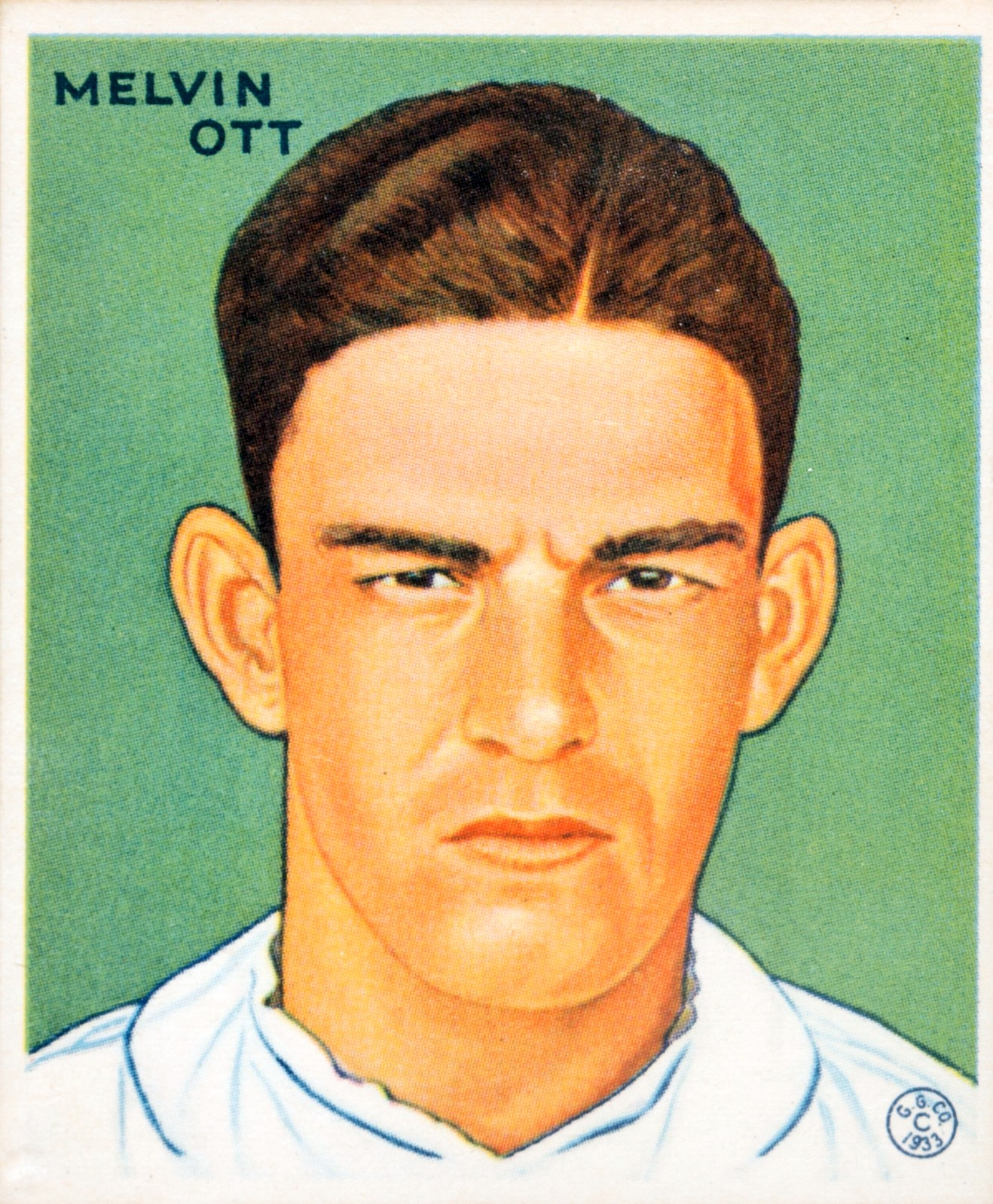
In 1929, Mel Ott hit one of that season's three cycles.

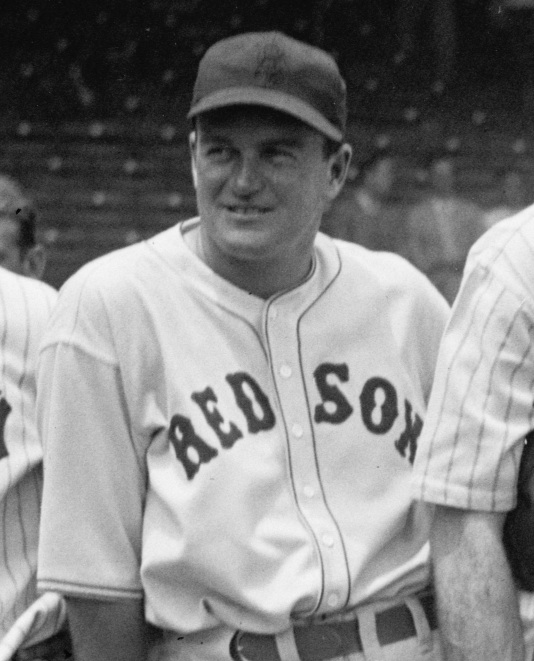
Joe Cronin's cycles came 11 seasons apart: in 1929 and in 1940.

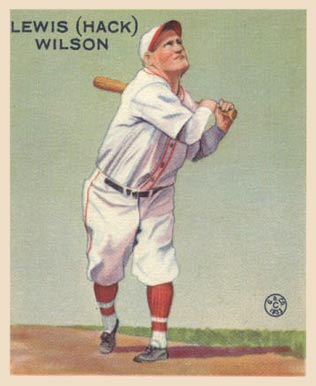
Hall of Famer Hack Wilson hit for the cycle on June 23, 1930.

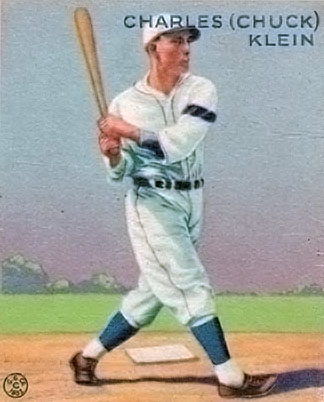
Chuck Klein hit the first of two cycles to occur in July 1931, also the first of his career; his second came two seasons later.

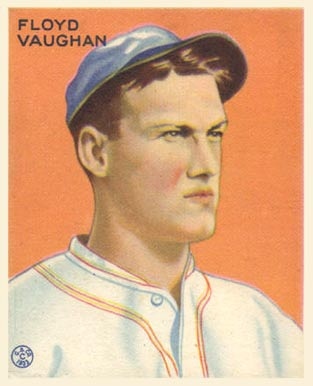
The last cycle of the 1930s was hit by Arky Vaughn.

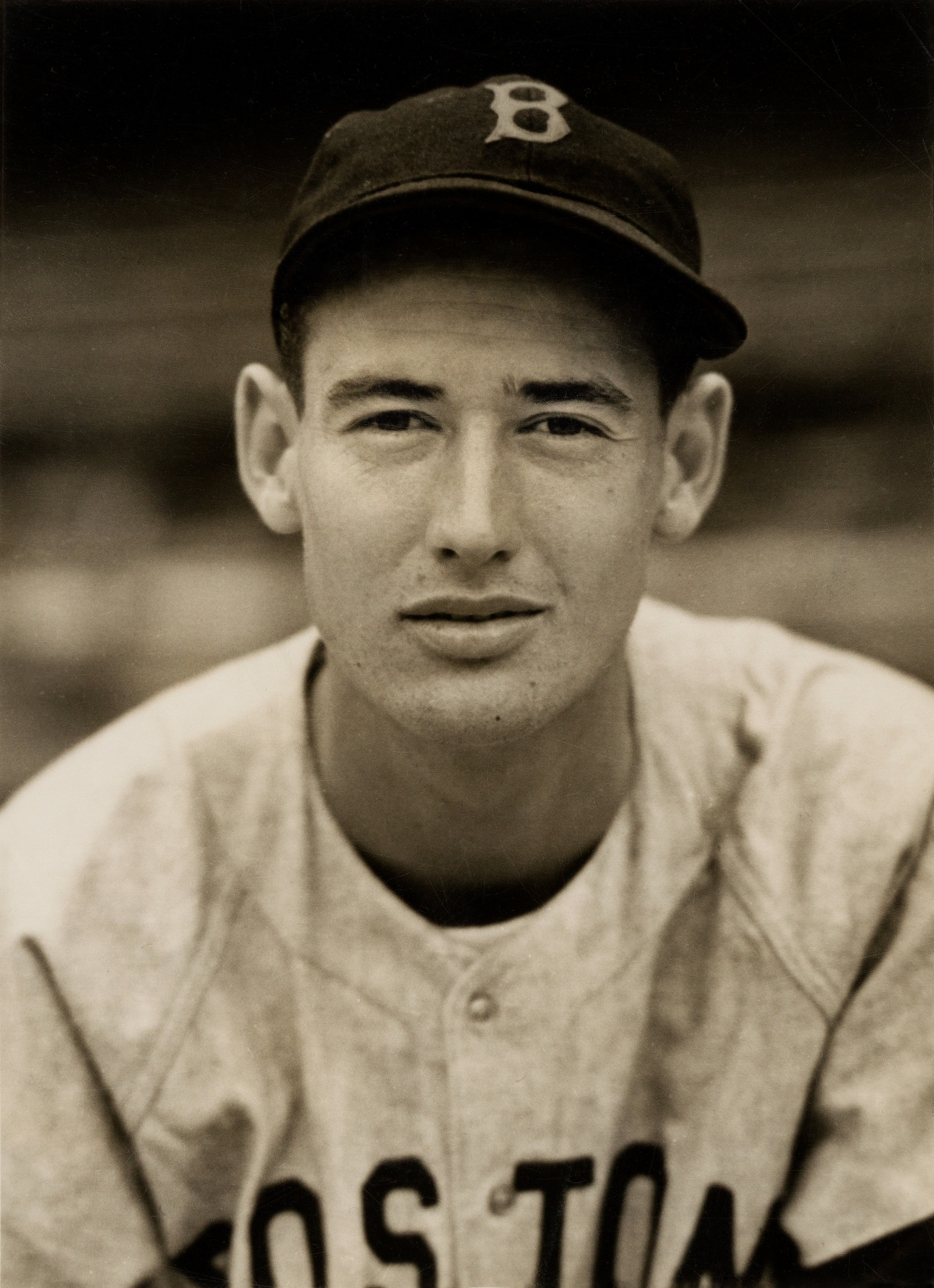
Ted Williams hit for the cycle on July 21, 1946, after spending the three previous seasons serving in the military during World War II.

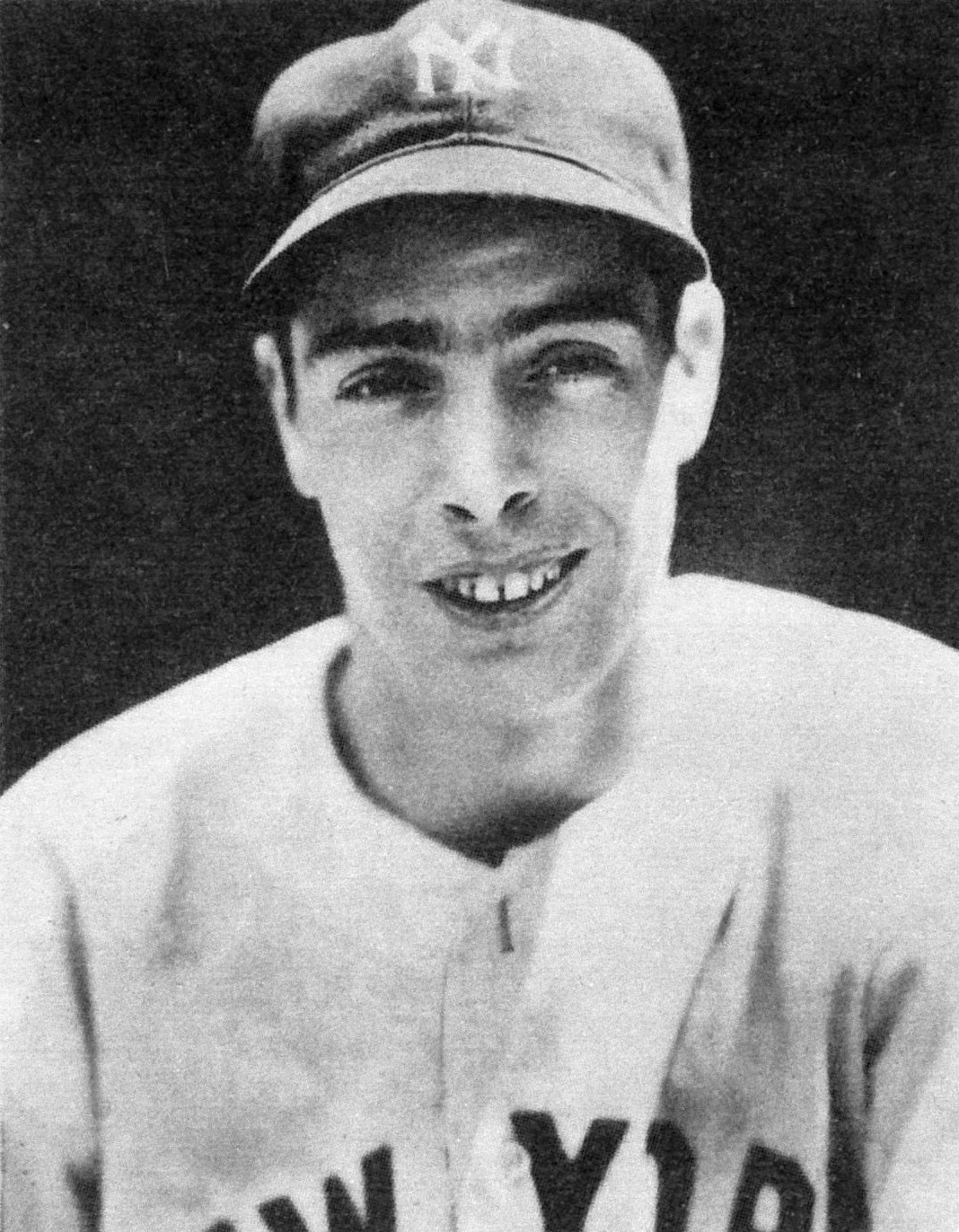
Joe DiMaggio hit his second cycle in 1948, eleven seasons after his first cycle.

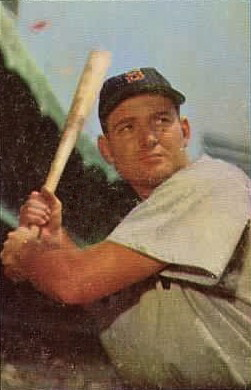
The first cycle of the 1950s was hit by George Kell as a member of the Detroit Tigers.

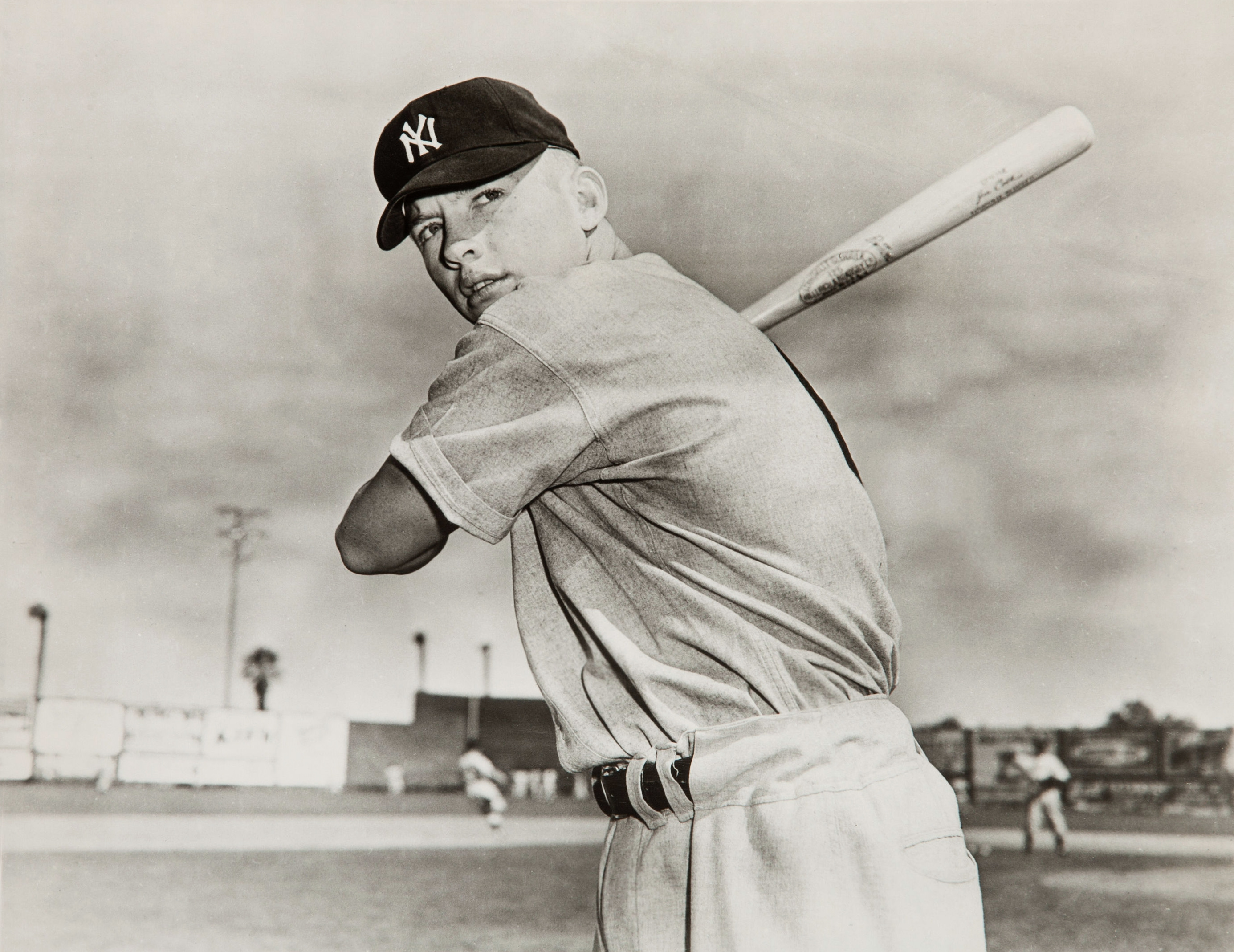
Mickey Mantle hit for the cycle in 1957.

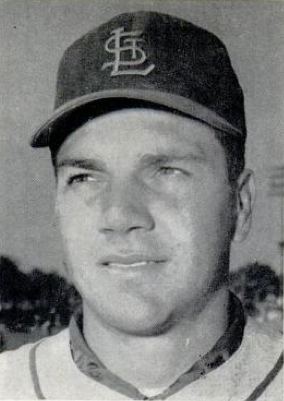
Ken Boyer hit for the cycle in 1961 and 1964, as a member of the St. Louis Cardinals.

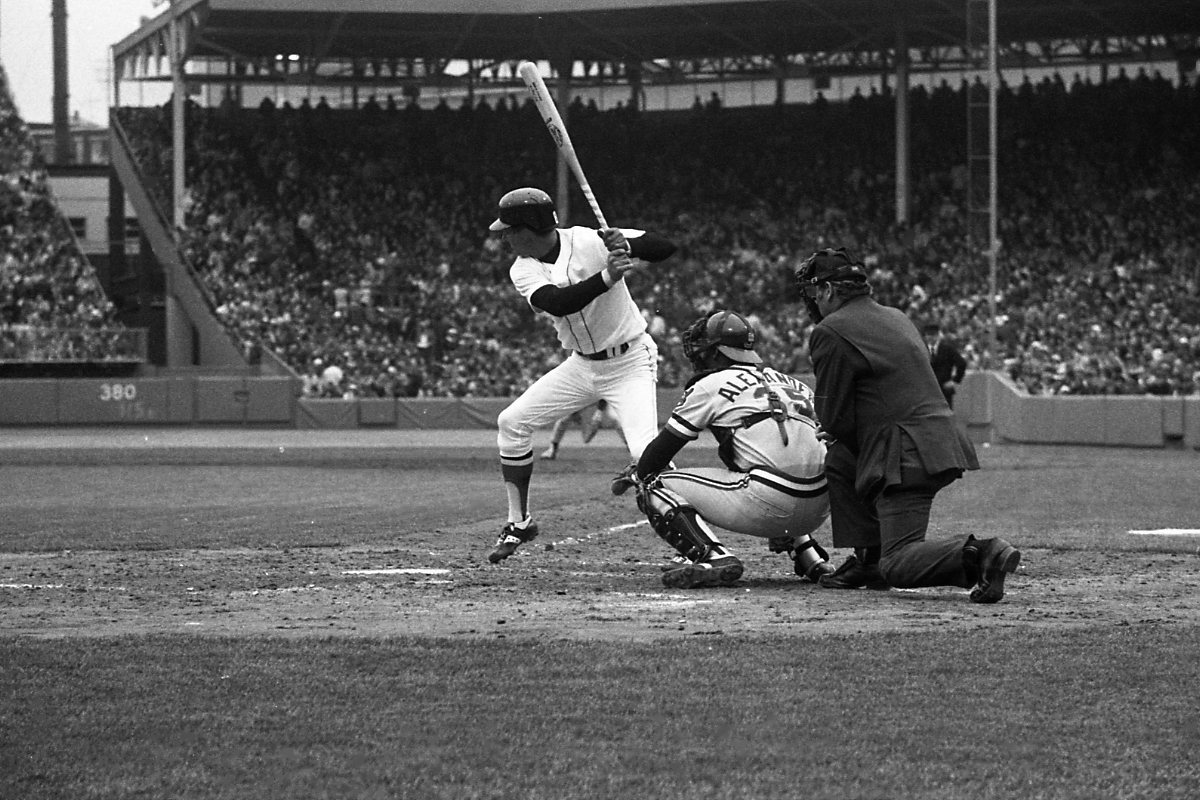
Carl Yastrzemski hit for the cycle against the Detroit Tigers in 1965.

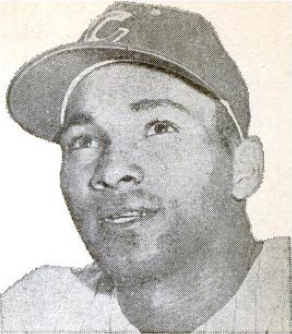
The last natural cycle of the 1960s was hit by Billy Williams in 1966.

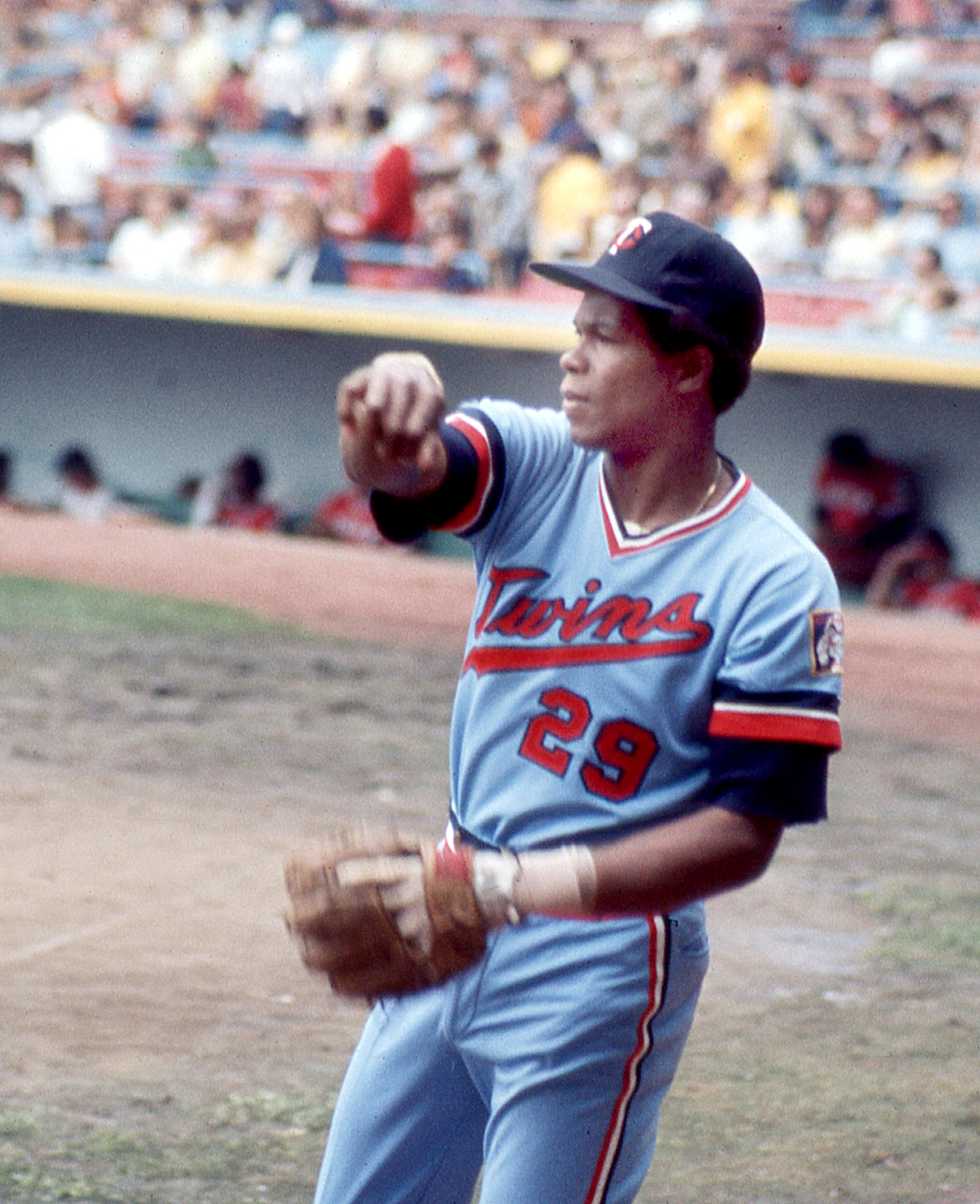
Rod Carew was one of five players to hit for the cycle in 1970.

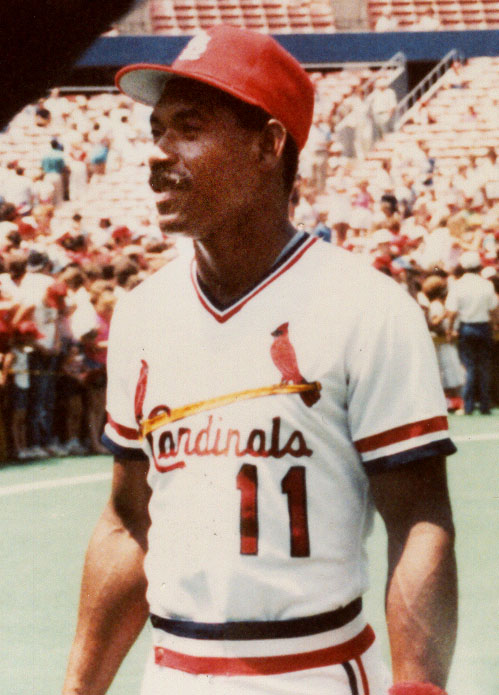
The first cycle of the 1980s was hit by Iván DeJesús.

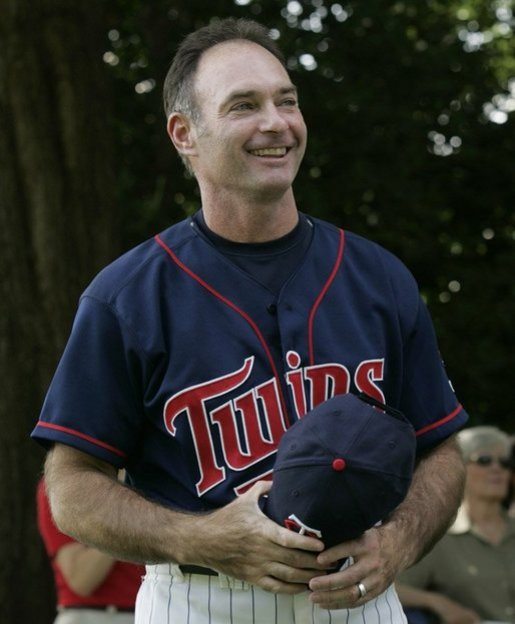
Paul Molitor hit for the cycle for the Milwaukee Brewers in 1991, before their transition to the National League.

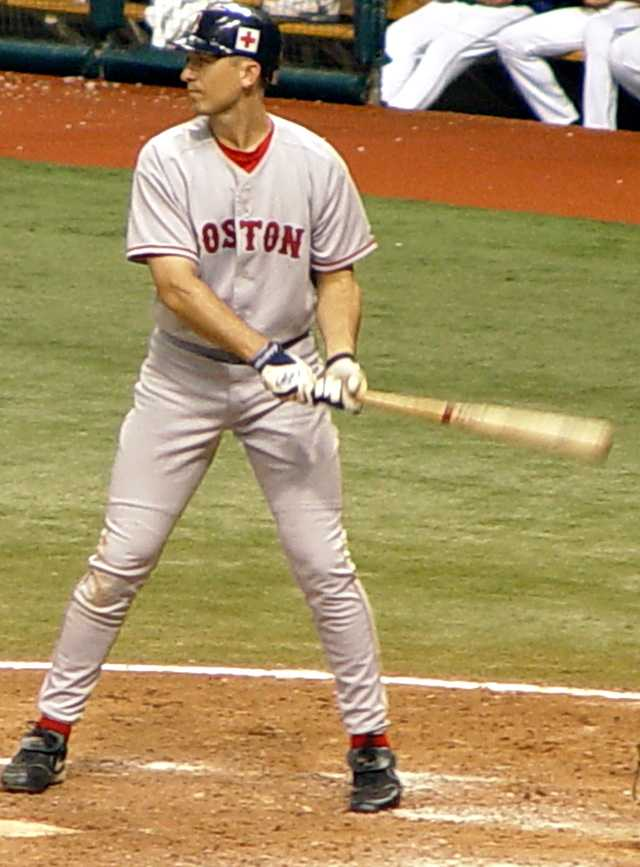
John Olerud is one of three players to hit for the cycle in both the National and American Leagues.

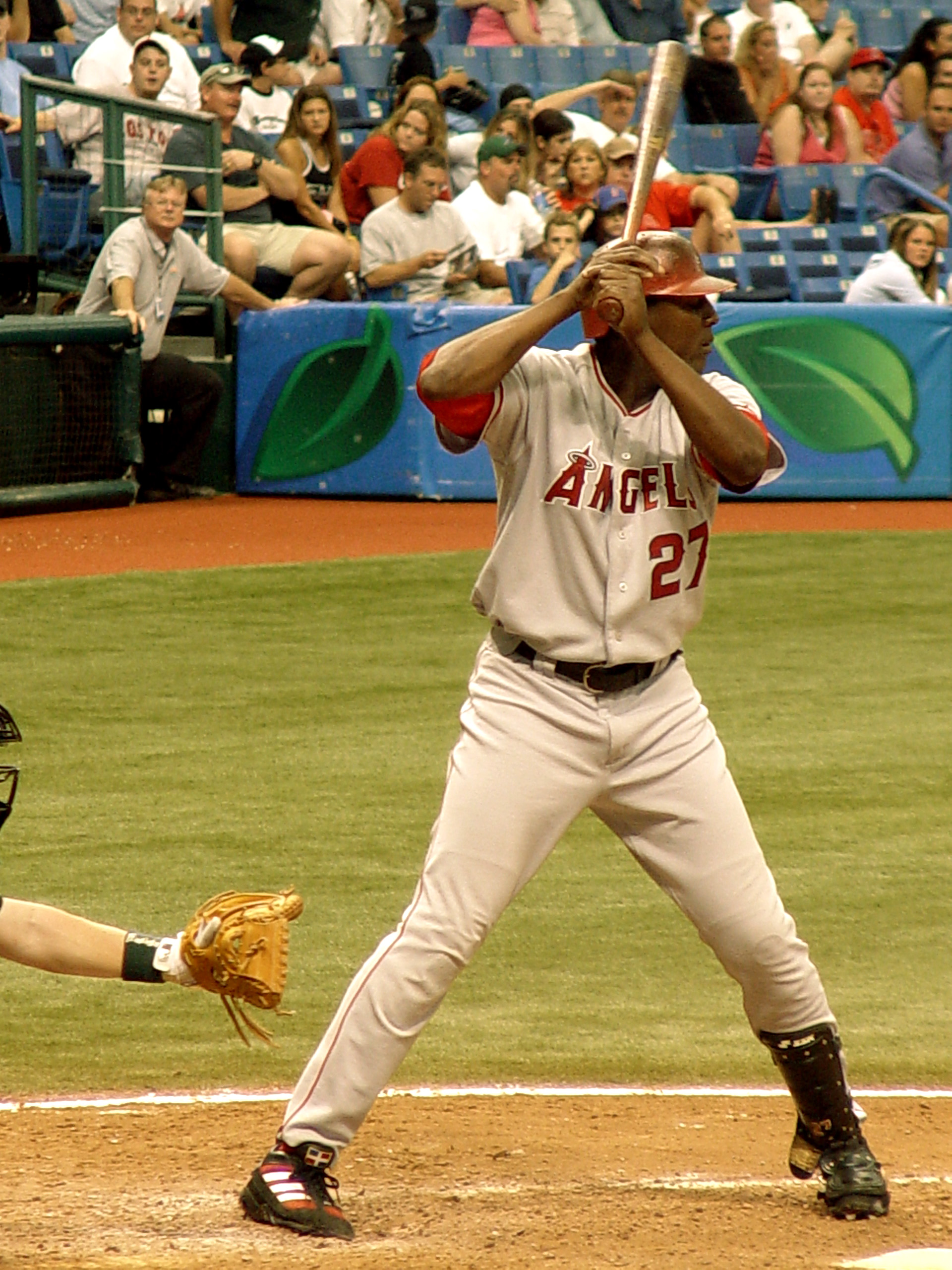
The last cycle by a Montreal Expos player was hit by Vladimir Guerrero in 2003.

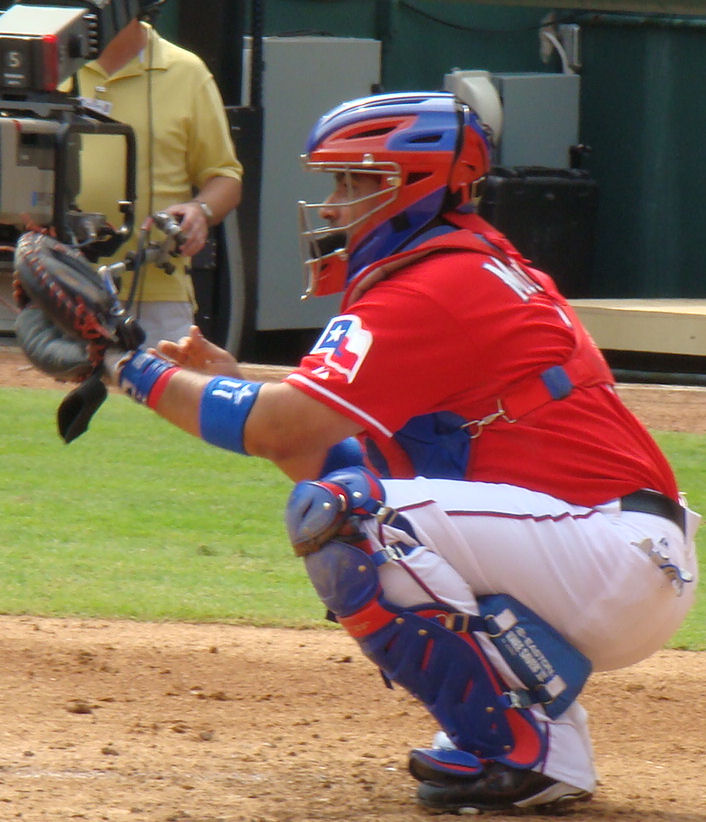
Bengie Molina was one of three players to hit for the cycle in July 2010.

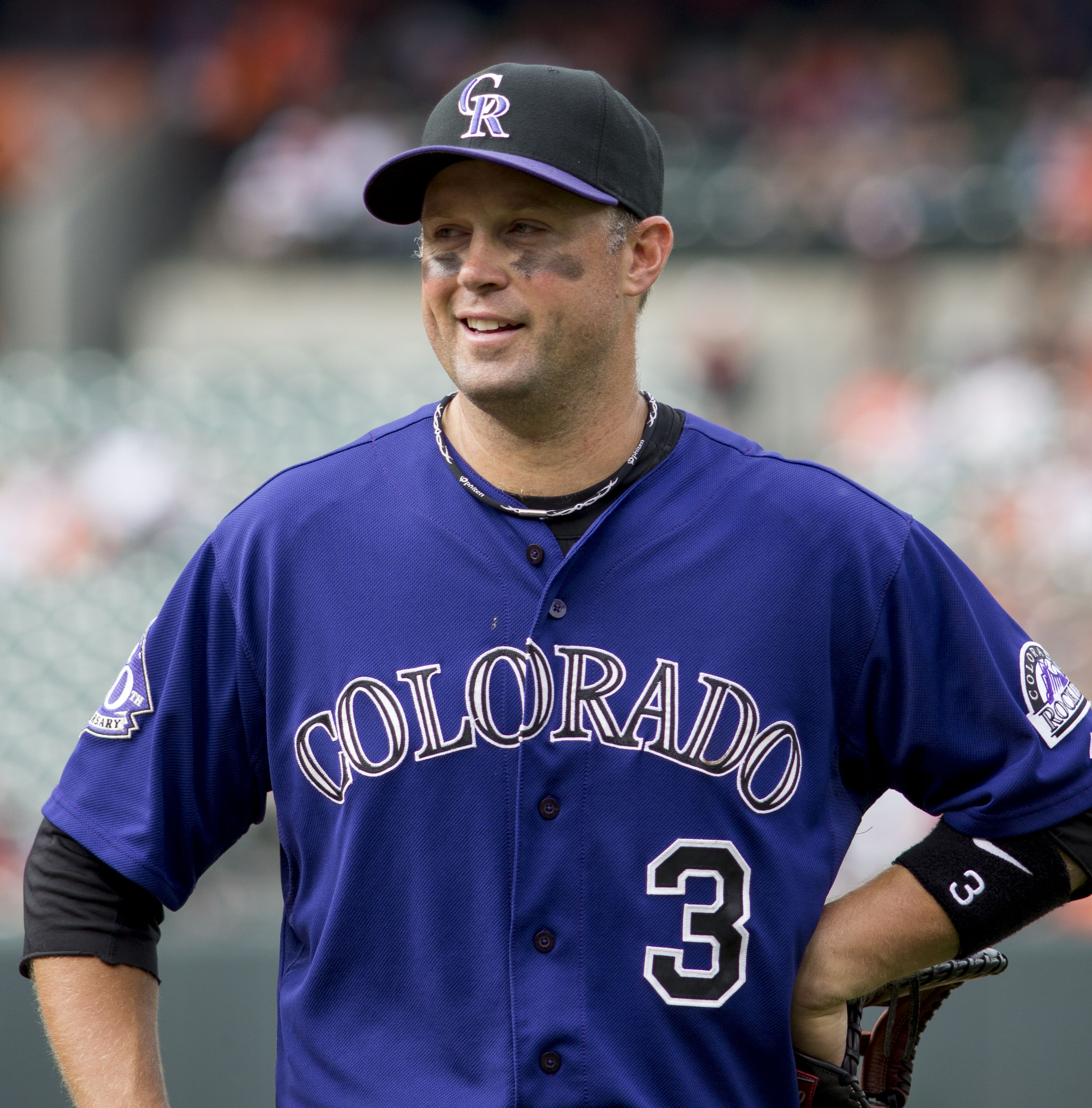
The only cycle of 2014 was hit by Michael Cuddyer; it was the second cycle of his career.

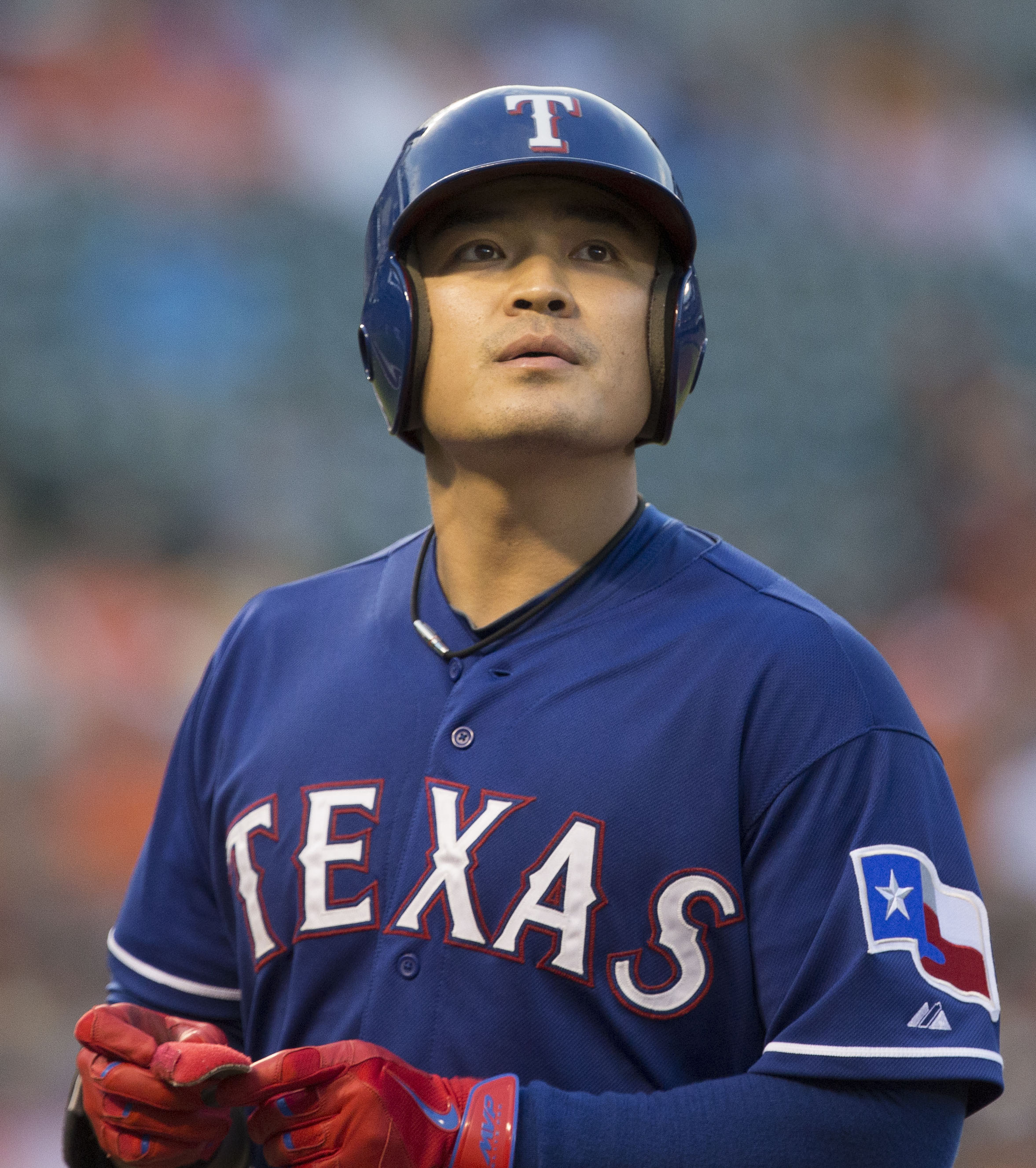
Rangers outfielder Shin-Soo Choo hit for the cycle on July 21, 2015; his teammate Adrián Beltré hit for his third career cycle 13 days later.

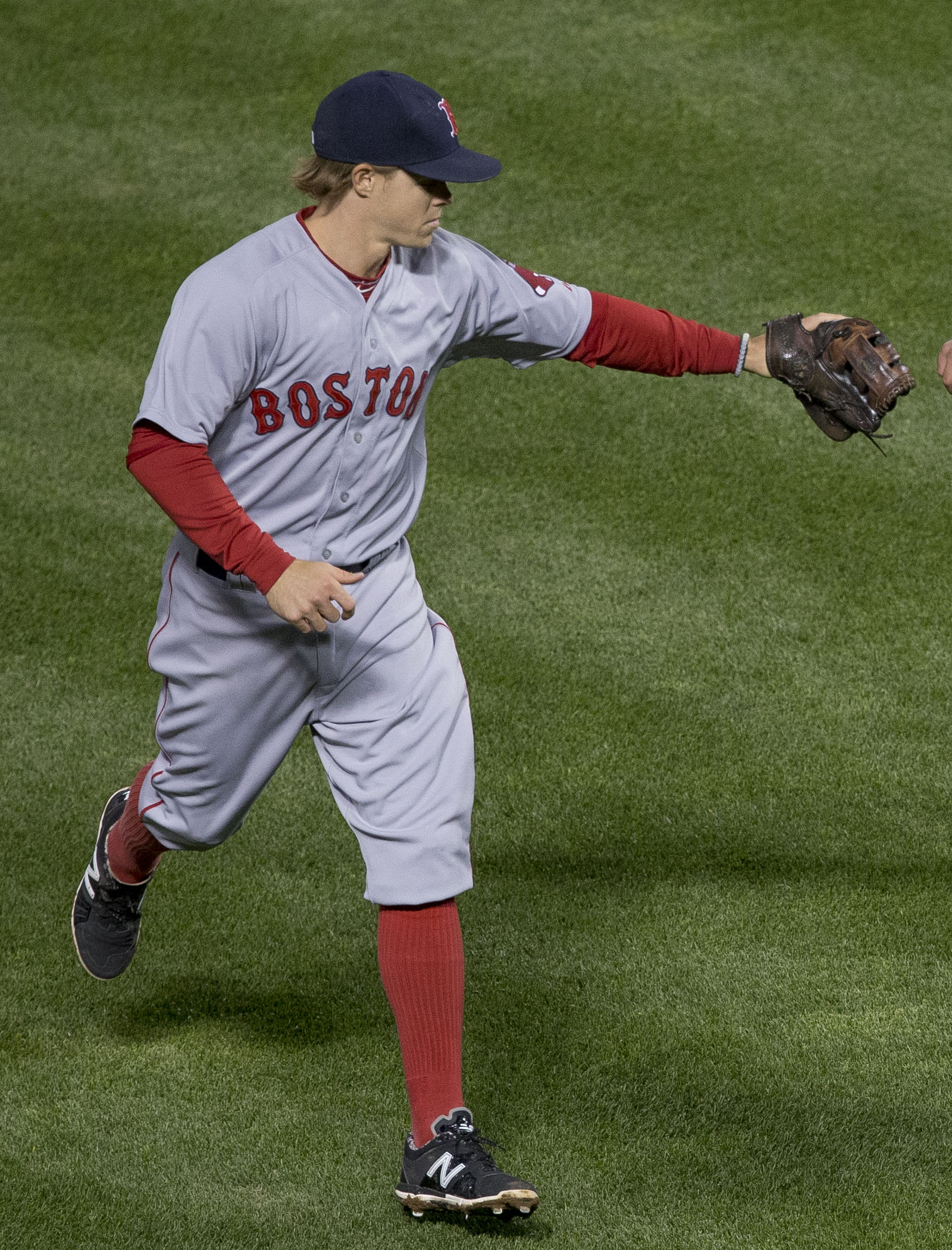
Brock Holt of the Boston Red Sox was the first player to hit for the cycle in the postseason.

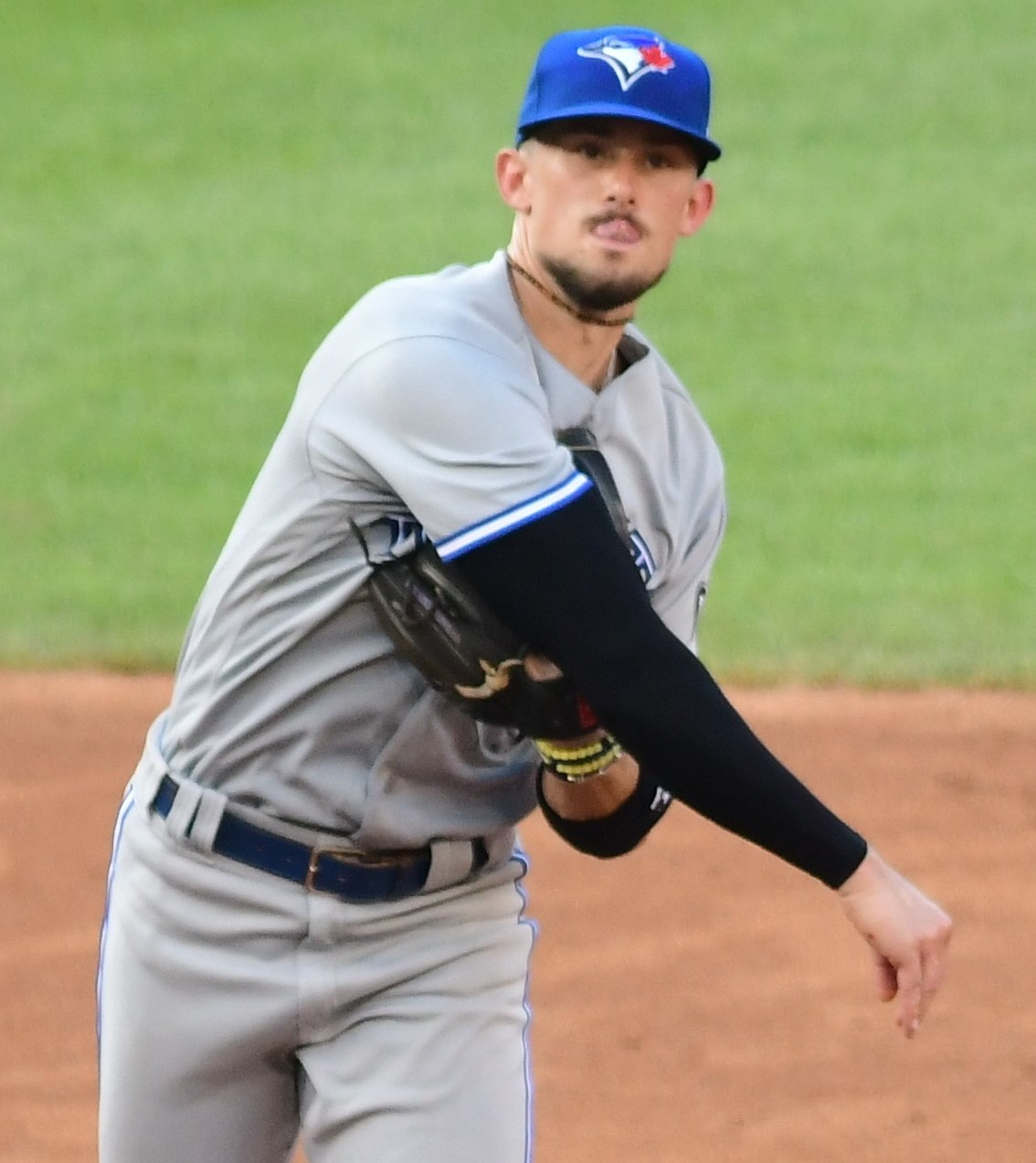
Cavan Biggio of the Toronto Blue Jays hit for the cycle in 2019.

Key to symbols in player table
^{P}	Player recorded cycle in a postseason game
^{N}	Player recorded a natural cycle (1B, 2B, 3B, HR in that order)
^{R}	Player recorded a reverse natural cycle (HR, 3B, 2B, 1B in that order)
(x)	Number of cycles recorded to that point (if the player recorded more than one)
(d)	Cycle is disputed by baseball historians
†	Player inducted into the Baseball Hall of Fame
‡	Player is still active

Major League Baseball players who have hit for the cycle
No.	Player	Date	Team	League	Opponent	Ref
—	George Hall (d)	June 14, 1876	Philadelphia Athletics	National League	Cincinnati Red Stockings	
1	Curry Foley	May 25, 1882	Buffalo Bisons	National League	Cleveland Blues	
2	Lon Knight^{N}	July 30, 1883	Philadelphia Athletics	American Association	Pittsburgh Alleghenys	
3	John Reilly (1)	September 12, 1883	Cincinnati Red Stockings	American Association	Pittsburgh Alleghenys	
4	John Reilly (2)	September 19, 1883	Cincinnati Red Stockings	American Association	Philadelphia Athletics	
5	Jim O'Rourke^{†}	June 16, 1884	Buffalo Bisons	National League	Chicago White Stockings	
6	Dave Orr (1)	June 12, 1885	New York Metropolitans	American Association	St. Louis Browns	
7	George Wood	June 13, 1885	Detroit Wolverines	National League	Chicago White Stockings	
8	Henry Larkin^{R}	June 16, 1885	Philadelphia Athletics	American Association	Pittsburgh Alleghenys	
9	Mox McQuery	September 28, 1885	Detroit Wolverines	National League	Providence Grays	
10	Fred Dunlap	May 24, 1886	St. Louis Maroons	National League	New York Gothams	
11	Pete Browning (1)	August 8, 1886	Louisville Colonels	American Association	New York Metropolitans	
12	Jack Rowe	August 21, 1886	Detroit Wolverines	National League	Chicago White Stockings	
13	Chippy McGarr	September 23, 1886	Philadelphia Athletics	American Association	St. Louis Browns	
14	Tip O'Neill (1)	April 30, 1887	St. Louis Browns	American Association	Cleveland Blues	
15	Fred Carroll	May 2, 1887	Pittsburgh Alleghenys	National League	Detroit Wolverines	
16	Tip O'Neill (2)	May 7, 1887	St. Louis Browns	American Association	Louisville Colonels	
17	Dave Orr (2)	August 10, 1887	New York Metropolitans	American Association	Baltimore Orioles	
18	Bid McPhee^{†}^{R}	August 26, 1887	Cincinnati Red Stockings	American Association	Baltimore Orioles	
19	Harry Stovey	May 15, 1888	Philadelphia Athletics	American Association	Baltimore Orioles	
20	Sam Barkley	June 13, 1888	Kansas City Cowboys	American Association	Cincinnati Red Stockings	
21	Jimmy Ryan (1)	July 28, 1888	Chicago White Stockings	National League	Detroit Wolverines	
22	Mike Tiernan (1)	August 25, 1888	New York Giants	National League	Philadelphia Quakers	
23	Pete Browning (2)	June 7, 1889	Louisville Colonels	American Association	Philadelphia Athletics	
24	Jack Glasscock	August 8, 1889	Indianapolis Hoosiers	National League	New York Giants	
25	Larry Twitchell	August 15, 1889	Cleveland Spiders	National League	Boston Beaneaters	
26	Mike Tiernan (2)	June 28, 1890	New York Giants	National League	Cincinnati Reds	
27	Bill Van Dyke	July 5, 1890	Toledo Maumees	American Association	Syracuse Stars	
28	Jumbo Davis	July 18, 1890	Brooklyn Gladiators	American Association	Louisville Colonels	
29	Roger Connor^{†}	July 21, 1890	New York Giants	Players' League	Buffalo Bisons	
30	Oyster Burns	August 1, 1890	Brooklyn Bridegrooms	National League	Pittsburgh Alleghenys	
31	John Reilly (3)	August 6, 1890	Cincinnati Reds	National League	Pittsburgh Alleghenys	
32	Farmer Weaver	August 12, 1890	Louisville Colonels	American Association	Syracuse Stars	
33	Jimmy Ryan (2)	July 1, 1891	Chicago Colts	National League	Cleveland Spiders	
34	Abner Dalrymple	September 12, 1891	Milwaukee Brewers	American Association	Washington Statesmen	
35	Lave Cross	April 24, 1894	Philadelphia Phillies	National League	Brooklyn Grooms	
36	Bill Hassamaer	June 13, 1894	Washington Senators	National League	St. Louis Browns	
37	Sam Thompson^{†}	August 17, 1894	Philadelphia Phillies	National League	Louisville Colonels	
38	Tom Parrott	September 28, 1894	Cincinnati Reds	National League	New York Giants	
39	Tommy Dowd	August 16, 1895	St. Louis Browns	National League	Louisville Colonels	
40	Ed Cartwright	September 30, 1895	Washington Senators	National League	Boston Beaneaters	
41	Herman Long	May 9, 1896	Boston Beaneaters	National League	Louisville Colonels	
42	Bill Joyce	May 30, 1896	Washington Senators	National League	Pittsburgh Pirates	
43	Fred Clarke^{†} (1)	July 23, 1901	Pittsburgh Pirates	National League	Cincinnati Reds	
44	Nap Lajoie^{†}	July 30, 1901	Philadelphia Athletics	American League	Cleveland Blues	
45	Fred Clarke^{†} (2)	May 7, 1903	Pittsburgh Pirates	National League	Cincinnati Reds	
46	Buck Freeman	June 21, 1903	Boston Americans	American League	Cleveland Naps	
47	Patsy Dougherty	July 29, 1903	Boston Americans	American League	New York Highlanders	
48	Bill Bradley	September 24, 1903	Cleveland Naps	American League	Washington Senators	
49	Duff Cooley	June 20, 1904	Boston Beaneaters	National League	Philadelphia Phillies	
50	Sam Mertes^{R}	October 4, 1904	New York Giants	National League	St. Louis Cardinals	
51	Johnny Bates	April 26, 1907	Boston Doves	National League	Brooklyn Superbas	
52	Otis Clymer	October 2, 1908	Washington Senators	American League	New York Highlanders	
53	Chief Wilson	July 3, 1910	Pittsburgh Pirates	National League	Cincinnati Reds	
54	Danny Murphy	August 25, 1910	Philadelphia Athletics	American League	St. Louis Browns	
55	Bill Collins^{N}	October 6, 1910	Boston Doves	National League	Philadelphia Phillies	
56	Frank Baker^{†}	July 3, 1911	Philadelphia Athletics	American League	New York Highlanders	
57	Tris Speaker^{†}	June 9, 1912	Boston Red Sox	American League	St. Louis Browns	
58	Chief Meyers	June 10, 1912	New York Giants	National League	Chicago Cubs	
59	Bert Daniels	July 25, 1912	New York Highlanders	American League	Chicago White Sox	
60	Honus Wagner^{†}	August 22, 1912	Pittsburgh Pirates	National League	New York Giants	
61	Ed Lennox	May 6, 1914	Pittsburgh Rebels	Federal League	Kansas City Packers	
62	Heinie Groh	July 5, 1915	Cincinnati Reds	National League	Chicago Cubs	
63	Cliff Heathcote	June 13, 1918	St. Louis Cardinals	National League	Philadelphia Phillies	
64	George Sisler^{†} (1)	August 8, 1920	St. Louis Browns	American League	Washington Senators	
65	George Burns	September 17, 1920	New York Giants	National League	Pittsburgh Pirates	
66	Bobby Veach	September 17, 1920	Detroit Tigers	American League	Boston Red Sox	
67	Bob Meusel (1)	May 7, 1921	New York Yankees	American League	Washington Senators	
68	Dave Bancroft^{†}	June 1, 1921	New York Giants	National League	Philadelphia Phillies	
69	George Sisler^{†} (2)	August 13, 1921	St. Louis Browns	American League	Detroit Tigers	
70	Dave Robertson	August 30, 1921	Pittsburgh Pirates	National League	Brooklyn Robins	
71	Ross Youngs^{†}	April 29, 1922	New York Giants	National League	Boston Braves	
72	Jimmy Johnston	May 25, 1922	Brooklyn Robins	National League	Philadelphia Phillies	
73	Ray Schalk^{†}	June 27, 1922	Chicago White Sox	American League	Detroit Tigers	
74	Bob Meusel (2)	July 3, 1922	New York Yankees	American League	Philadelphia Athletics	
75	Pie Traynor^{†}	July 7, 1923	Pittsburgh Pirates	National League	Philadelphia Phillies	
76	Baby Doll Jacobson	April 17, 1924	St. Louis Browns	American League	Chicago White Sox	
77	Goose Goslin^{†}	August 28, 1924	Washington Senators	American League	New York Yankees	
78	Kiki Cuyler^{†}	June 4, 1925	Pittsburgh Pirates	National League	Philadelphia Phillies	
79	Max Carey^{†}	June 20, 1925	Pittsburgh Pirates	National League	Brooklyn Robins	
80	Roy Carlyle	July 21, 1925	Boston Red Sox	American League	Chicago White Sox	
81	Bob Fothergill^{N}	September 26, 1926	Detroit Tigers	American League	Boston Red Sox	
82	Jim Bottomley^{†}	July 15, 1927	St. Louis Cardinals	National League	Philadelphia Phillies	
83	Cy Williams	August 5, 1927	Philadelphia Phillies	National League	Pittsburgh Pirates	
84	Bill Terry^{†}	May 29, 1928	New York Giants	National League	Brooklyn Robins	
85	Bob Meusel (3)	July 26, 1928	New York Yankees	American League	Detroit Tigers	
86	Mel Ott^{†}	May 16, 1929	New York Giants	National League	Boston Braves	
87	Ski Melillo	May 23, 1929	St. Louis Browns	American League	Cleveland Indians	
88	Joe Cronin^{†} (1)	September 2, 1929	Washington Senators	American League	Boston Red Sox	
89	Freddie Lindstrom^{†}	May 8, 1930	New York Giants	National League	Pittsburgh Pirates	
90	Hack Wilson^{†}	June 23, 1930	Chicago Cubs	National League	Philadelphia Phillies	
91	Chick Hafey^{†}	August 21, 1930	St. Louis Cardinals	National League	Philadelphia Phillies	
92	Babe Herman (1)	May 18, 1931	Brooklyn Robins	National League	Cincinnati Reds	
93	Chuck Klein^{†} (1)	July 1, 1931	Philadelphia Phillies	National League	Chicago Cubs	
94	Babe Herman (2)	July 24, 1931	Brooklyn Robins	National League	Pittsburgh Pirates	
95	Tony Lazzeri^{†}^{N}	June 3, 1932	New York Yankees	American League	Philadelphia Athletics	
96	Mickey Cochrane^{†} (1)	July 22, 1932	Philadelphia Athletics	American League	Washington Senators	
97	Pepper Martin	May 5, 1933	St. Louis Cardinals	National League	Philadelphia Phillies	
98	Chuck Klein^{†} (2)	May 26, 1933	Philadelphia Phillies	National League	St. Louis Cardinals	
99	Arky Vaughan^{†} (1)	June 24, 1933	Pittsburgh Pirates	National League	Brooklyn Dodgers	
100	Mickey Cochrane^{†} (2)	August 2, 1933	Philadelphia Athletics	American League	New York Yankees	
101	Pinky Higgins	August 6, 1933	Philadelphia Athletics	American League	Washington Senators	
102	Jimmie Foxx^{†}	August 14, 1933	Philadelphia Athletics	American League	Cleveland Indians	
103	Earl Averill^{†}	August 17, 1933	Cleveland Indians	American League	Philadelphia Athletics	
104	Babe Herman (3)	September 30, 1933	Chicago Cubs	National League	St. Louis Cardinals	
105	Doc Cramer	June 10, 1934	Philadelphia Athletics	American League	New York Yankees	
106	Lou Gehrig^{†} (1)	June 25, 1934	New York Yankees	American League	Chicago White Sox	
107	Moose Solters	August 19, 1934	Boston Red Sox	American League	Detroit Tigers	
108	Joe Medwick^{†}	June 29, 1935	St. Louis Cardinals	National League	Cincinnati Reds	
109	Sam Leslie	May 24, 1936	New York Giants	National League	Philadelphia Phillies	
110	Gee Walker^{R}	April 20, 1937	Detroit Tigers	American League	Cleveland Indians	
111	Joe DiMaggio^{†} (1)	July 9, 1937	New York Yankees	American League	Washington Senators	
112	Lou Gehrig^{†} (2)	August 1, 1937	New York Yankees	American League	St. Louis Browns	
113	Odell Hale	July 12, 1938	Cleveland Indians	American League	Washington Senators	
114	Sam Chapman	May 5, 1939	Philadelphia Athletics	American League	St. Louis Browns	
115	Charlie Gehringer^{†}^{N}	May 27, 1939	Detroit Tigers	American League	St. Louis Browns	
116	Arky Vaughan^{†}^{R} (2)	July 19, 1939	Pittsburgh Pirates	National League	New York Giants	
117	Harry Craft	June 8, 1940	Cincinnati Reds	National League	Brooklyn Dodgers	
118	Harry Danning	June 15, 1940	New York Giants	National League	Pittsburgh Pirates	
119	Johnny Mize^{†}	July 13, 1940	St. Louis Cardinals	National League	New York Giants	
120	Buddy Rosar	July 19, 1940	New York Yankees	American League	Cleveland Indians	
121	Joe Cronin^{†} (2)	August 2, 1940	Boston Red Sox	American League	Detroit Tigers	
122	Joe Gordon^{†}	September 8, 1940	New York Yankees	American League	Boston Red Sox	
123	George McQuinn	July 19, 1941	St. Louis Browns	American League	Boston Red Sox	
124	Leon Culberson^{N}	July 3, 1943	Boston Red Sox	American League	Cleveland Indians	
125	Bobby Doerr^{†} (1)	May 17, 1944	Boston Red Sox	American League	St. Louis Browns	
126	Bob Johnson	July 6, 1944	Boston Red Sox	American League	Detroit Tigers	
127	Dixie Walker	September 2, 1944	Brooklyn Dodgers	National League	New York Giants	
128	Bob Elliott	July 15, 1945	Pittsburgh Pirates	National League	Brooklyn Dodgers	
129	Bill Salkeld	August 4, 1945	Pittsburgh Pirates	National League	St. Louis Cardinals	
130	Mickey Vernon	May 19, 1946	Washington Senators	American League	Chicago White Sox	
131	Ted Williams^{†}	July 21, 1946	Boston Red Sox	American League	St. Louis Browns	
132	Bobby Doerr^{†} (2)	May 13, 1947	Boston Red Sox	American League	Chicago White Sox	
133	Vic Wertz	September 14, 1947	Detroit Tigers	American League	Washington Senators	
134	Joe DiMaggio^{†} (2)	May 20, 1948	New York Yankees	American League	Chicago White Sox	
135	Wally Westlake (1)	July 30, 1948	Pittsburgh Pirates	National League	Brooklyn Dodgers	
136	Jackie Robinson^{†}^{R}	August 29, 1948	Brooklyn Dodgers	National League	St. Louis Cardinals	
137	Wally Westlake (2)	June 14, 1949	Pittsburgh Pirates	National League	Boston Braves	
138	Gil Hodges^{†}	June 25, 1949	Brooklyn Dodgers	National League	Pittsburgh Pirates	
139	Stan Musial^{†}	July 24, 1949	St. Louis Cardinals	National League	Brooklyn Dodgers	
140	George Kell^{†}	June 2, 1950	Detroit Tigers	American League	Philadelphia Athletics	
141	Ralph Kiner^{†}	June 25, 1950	Pittsburgh Pirates	National League	Brooklyn Dodgers	
142	Roy Smalley	June 28, 1950	Chicago Cubs	National League	St. Louis Cardinals	
143	Elmer Valo	August 2, 1950	Philadelphia Athletics	American League	Chicago White Sox	
144	Hoot Evers	September 7, 1950	Detroit Tigers	American League	Cleveland Indians	
145	Gus Bell	June 4, 1951	Pittsburgh Pirates	National League	Philadelphia Phillies	
146	Larry Doby^{†}	June 4, 1952	Cleveland Indians	American League	Boston Red Sox	
147	Don Mueller	July 11, 1954	New York Giants	National League	Pittsburgh Pirates	
148	Lee Walls	July 2, 1957	Chicago Cubs	National League	Cincinnati Redlegs	
149	Mickey Mantle^{†}	July 23, 1957	New York Yankees	American League	Chicago White Sox	
150	Frank Robinson^{†}	May 2, 1959	Cincinnati Reds	National League	Los Angeles Dodgers	
151	Brooks Robinson^{†}	July 15, 1960	Baltimore Orioles	American League	Chicago White Sox	
152	Bill White	August 14, 1960	St. Louis Cardinals	National League	Pittsburgh Pirates	
153	Ken Boyer (1)	September 14, 1961	St. Louis Cardinals	National League	Chicago Cubs	
154	Lou Clinton	July 13, 1962	Boston Red Sox	American League	Kansas City Athletics	
155	Johnny Callison	June 27, 1963	Philadelphia Phillies	National League	Pittsburgh Pirates	
156	Jim Hickman^{N}	August 7, 1963	New York Mets	National League	St. Louis Cardinals	
157	Jim King	May 26, 1964	Washington Senators	American League	Boston Red Sox	
158	Ken Boyer^{N} (2)	June 16, 1964	St. Louis Cardinals	National League	Houston Colt .45s	
159	Willie Stargell^{†}	July 22, 1964	Pittsburgh Pirates	National League	St. Louis Cardinals	
160	Jim Fregosi (1)	July 28, 1964	Los Angeles Angels	American League	New York Yankees	
161	Carl Yastrzemski^{†}	May 14, 1965	Boston Red Sox	American League	Detroit Tigers	
162	Billy Williams^{†}^{N}	July 17, 1966	Chicago Cubs	National League	St. Louis Cardinals	
163	Randy Hundley	August 11, 1966	Chicago Cubs	National League	Houston Astros	
164	Jim Fregosi^{R} (2)	May 20, 1968	California Angels	American League	Boston Red Sox	
165	Wes Parker	May 7, 1970	Los Angeles Dodgers	National League	New York Mets	
166	Rod Carew^{†}	May 20, 1970	Minnesota Twins	American League	Kansas City Royals	
167	Tony Horton	July 2, 1970	Cleveland Indians	American League	Baltimore Orioles	
168	Tommie Agee	July 6, 1970	New York Mets	National League	St. Louis Cardinals	
169	Jim Ray Hart	July 8, 1970	San Francisco Giants	National League	Atlanta Braves	
170	Freddie Patek	July 9, 1971	Kansas City Royals	American League	Minnesota Twins	
171	Dave Kingman	April 16, 1972	San Francisco Giants	National League	Houston Astros	
172	César Cedeño (1)	August 2, 1972	Houston Astros	National League	Cincinnati Reds	
173	Bobby Murcer	August 29, 1972	New York Yankees	American League	Texas Rangers	
174	César Tovar	September 19, 1972	Minnesota Twins	American League	Texas Rangers	
175	Joe Torre^{†}	June 27, 1973	St. Louis Cardinals	National League	Pittsburgh Pirates	
176	Richie Zisk	June 9, 1974	Pittsburgh Pirates	National League	San Francisco Giants	
177	Lou Brock^{†}	May 27, 1975	St. Louis Cardinals	National League	San Diego Padres	
178	Tim Foli^{N}	April 22, 1976	Montreal Expos	National League	Chicago Cubs	
179	Larry Hisle	June 4, 1976	Minnesota Twins	American League	Baltimore Orioles	
180	Mike Phillips	June 25, 1976	New York Mets	National League	Chicago Cubs	
181	Lyman Bostock	July 24, 1976	Minnesota Twins	American League	Chicago White Sox	
182	César Cedeño (2)	August 9, 1976	Houston Astros	National League	St. Louis Cardinals	
183	Mike Hegan	September 3, 1976	Milwaukee Brewers	American League	Detroit Tigers	
184	Bob Watson (1)	June 24, 1977	Houston Astros	National League	San Francisco Giants	
185	John Mayberry	August 5, 1977	Kansas City Royals	American League	Chicago White Sox	
186	Jack Brohamer	September 24, 1977	Chicago White Sox	American League	Seattle Mariners	
187	Andre Thornton	April 22, 1978	Cleveland Indians	American League	Boston Red Sox	
188	Chris Speier (1)	July 20, 1978	Montreal Expos	National League	Atlanta Braves	
189	Mike Cubbage	July 27, 1978	Minnesota Twins	American League	Toronto Blue Jays	
190	George Brett^{†} (1)	May 28, 1979	Kansas City Royals	American League	Baltimore Orioles	
191	Dan Ford	August 10, 1979	California Angels	American League	Seattle Mariners	
192	Bob Watson^{N} (2)	September 15, 1979	Boston Red Sox	American League	Baltimore Orioles	
193	Frank White (1)	September 26, 1979	Kansas City Royals	American League	California Angels	
194	Iván DeJesús	April 22, 1980	Chicago Cubs	National League	St. Louis Cardinals	
195	Fred Lynn	May 13, 1980	Boston Red Sox	American League	Minnesota Twins	
196	Mike Easler	June 12, 1980	Pittsburgh Pirates	National League	Cincinnati Reds	
197	Gary Ward	September 18, 1980	Minnesota Twins	American League	Milwaukee Brewers	
198	Charlie Moore	October 1, 1980	Milwaukee Brewers	American League	California Angels	
199	Frank White (2)	August 3, 1982	Kansas City Royals	American League	Detroit Tigers	
200	Cal Ripken Jr.^{†}	May 6, 1984	Baltimore Orioles	American League	Texas Rangers	
201	Carlton Fisk^{†}	May 16, 1984	Chicago White Sox	American League	Kansas City Royals	
202	Willie McGee	June 23, 1984 (Note: See also Sandberg Game.)	St. Louis Cardinals	National League	Chicago Cubs	
203	Dwight Evans	June 28, 1984	Boston Red Sox	American League	Seattle Mariners	
204	Jeffrey Leonard	June 27, 1985	San Francisco Giants	National League	Cincinnati Reds	
205	Keith Hernandez	July 4, 1985	New York Mets	National League	Atlanta Braves	
206	Oddibe McDowell	July 23, 1985	Texas Rangers	American League	Cleveland Indians	
207	Rich Gedman	September 18, 1985	Boston Red Sox	American League	Toronto Blue Jays	
208	Tony Phillips	May 16, 1986	Oakland Athletics	American League	Baltimore Orioles	
209	Kirby Puckett^{†}	August 1, 1986	Minnesota Twins	American League	Oakland Athletics	
210	Andre Dawson^{†}	April 29, 1987	Chicago Cubs	National League	San Francisco Giants	
211	Candy Maldonado	May 4, 1987	San Francisco Giants	National League	St. Louis Cardinals	
212	Tim Raines^{†}	August 16, 1987	Montreal Expos	National League	Pittsburgh Pirates	
213	Albert Hall	September 23, 1987	Atlanta Braves	National League	Houston Astros	
214	Robin Yount^{†}	June 12, 1988	Milwaukee Brewers	American League	Chicago White Sox	
215	Chris Speier (2)	July 9, 1988	San Francisco Giants	National League	St. Louis Cardinals	
216	Mike Greenwell	September 14, 1988	Boston Red Sox	American League	Baltimore Orioles	
217	Kelly Gruber	April 16, 1989	Toronto Blue Jays	American League	Kansas City Royals	
218	Eric Davis	June 2, 1989	Cincinnati Reds	National League	San Diego Padres	
219	Kevin McReynolds	August 1, 1989	New York Mets	National League	St. Louis Cardinals	
220	Gary Redus	August 25, 1989	Pittsburgh Pirates	National League	Cincinnati Reds	
221	George Brett^{†} (2)	July 25, 1990	Kansas City Royals	American League	Toronto Blue Jays	
222	Robby Thompson	April 22, 1991	San Francisco Giants	National League	San Diego Padres	
223	Paul Molitor^{†}	May 15, 1991	Milwaukee Brewers	American League	Minnesota Twins	
224	Dave Winfield^{†}	June 24, 1991	California Angels	American League	Kansas City Royals	
225	Ray Lankford	September 15, 1991	St. Louis Cardinals	National League	New York Mets	
226	Andújar Cedeño	August 25, 1992	Houston Astros	National League	St. Louis Cardinals	
227	Mark Grace	May 9, 1993	Chicago Cubs	National League	San Diego Padres	
228	Jay Buhner	June 23, 1993	Seattle Mariners	American League	Oakland Athletics	
229	Travis Fryman	July 28, 1993	Detroit Tigers	American League	New York Yankees	
230	Scott Cooper	April 12, 1994	Boston Red Sox	American League	Kansas City Royals	
231	Rondell White	June 11, 1995	Montreal Expos	National League	San Francisco Giants	
232	Gregg Jefferies	August 25, 1995	Philadelphia Phillies	National League	Los Angeles Dodgers	
233	Tony Fernández	September 3, 1995	New York Yankees	American League	Oakland Athletics	
234	John Mabry^{N}	May 18, 1996	St. Louis Cardinals	National League	Colorado Rockies	
235	John Valentin	June 6, 1996	Boston Red Sox	American League	Chicago White Sox	
236	Alex Ochoa	July 3, 1996	New York Mets	National League	Philadelphia Phillies	
237	Alex Rodriguez	June 5, 1997	Seattle Mariners	American League	Detroit Tigers	
238	John Olerud (1)	September 11, 1997	New York Mets	National League	Montreal Expos	
239	Mike Blowers	May 18, 1998	Oakland Athletics	American League	Chicago White Sox	
240	Dante Bichette	June 10, 1998	Colorado Rockies	National League	Texas Rangers	
241	Neifi Pérez	July 25, 1998	Colorado Rockies	National League	St. Louis Cardinals	
242	Jeff Kent^{†}	May 3, 1999	San Francisco Giants	National League	Pittsburgh Pirates	
243	Todd Helton^{†}	June 19, 1999	Colorado Rockies	National League	Florida Marlins	
244	Chris Singleton	July 6, 1999	Chicago White Sox	American League	Kansas City Royals	
245	José Valentín^{N}	April 27, 2000	Chicago White Sox	American League	Baltimore Orioles	
246	Jason Kendall	May 19, 2000	Pittsburgh Pirates	National League	St. Louis Cardinals	
247	Mike Lansing	June 18, 2000	Colorado Rockies	National League	Arizona Diamondbacks	
248	Eric Chavez	June 21, 2000	Oakland Athletics	American League	Baltimore Orioles	
249	Luis Gonzalez	July 5, 2000	Arizona Diamondbacks	National League	Houston Astros	
250	Damion Easley	June 8, 2001	Detroit Tigers	American League	Milwaukee Brewers	
251	John Olerud (2)	June 16, 2001	Seattle Mariners	American League	San Diego Padres	
252	Jeff Bagwell^{†}	July 18, 2001	Houston Astros	National League	St. Louis Cardinals	
253	Jeff Frye	August 17, 2001	Toronto Blue Jays	American League	Texas Rangers	
254	Miguel Tejada	September 29, 2001	Oakland Athletics	American League	Seattle Mariners	
255	Craig Biggio^{†}	April 8, 2002	Houston Astros	National League	Colorado Rockies	
256	Greg Colbrunn	September 18, 2002	Arizona Diamondbacks	National League	San Diego Padres	
257	Brad Wilkerson^{N} (1)	June 24, 2003	Montreal Expos	National League	Pittsburgh Pirates	
258	Eric Byrnes	June 29, 2003	Oakland Athletics	American League	San Francisco Giants	
259	Travis Hafner	August 14, 2003	Cleveland Indians	American League	Minnesota Twins	
260	Vladimir Guerrero^{†}	September 14, 2003	Montreal Expos	National League	New York Mets	
261	Chad Moeller	April 27, 2004	Milwaukee Brewers	National League	Cincinnati Reds	
262	Daryle Ward	May 26, 2004	Pittsburgh Pirates	National League	St. Louis Cardinals	
263	David Bell	June 28, 2004	Philadelphia Phillies	National League	Montreal Expos	
264	Eric Valent	July 29, 2004	New York Mets	National League	Montreal Expos	
265	Mark Teixeira	August 17, 2004	Texas Rangers	American League	Cleveland Indians	
266	Jeff DaVanon	August 25, 2004	Anaheim Angels	American League	Kansas City Royals	
267	Brad Wilkerson (2)	April 6, 2005	Washington Nationals	National League	Philadelphia Phillies	
268	Mark Grudzielanek	April 27, 2005	St. Louis Cardinals	National League	Milwaukee Brewers	
269	Randy Winn	August 15, 2005	San Francisco Giants	National League	Cincinnati Reds	
270	José Reyes	June 21, 2006	New York Mets	National League	Cincinnati Reds	
271	Luke Scott^{R}	July 28, 2006	Houston Astros	National League	Arizona Diamondbacks	
272	Carlos Guillén	August 1, 2006	Detroit Tigers	American League	Tampa Bay Devil Rays	
273	Gary Matthews Jr.^{N}	September 13, 2006	Texas Rangers	American League	Detroit Tigers	
274	Chone Figgins	September 16, 2006	Los Angeles Angels of Anaheim	American League	Texas Rangers	
275	Fred Lewis	May 13, 2007	San Francisco Giants	National League	Colorado Rockies	
276	Mark Ellis	June 4, 2007	Oakland Athletics	American League	Boston Red Sox	
277	Aubrey Huff	June 29, 2007	Baltimore Orioles	American League	Los Angeles Angels of Anaheim	
278	Carlos Gómez (1)^{R}	May 7, 2008	Minnesota Twins	American League	Chicago White Sox	
279	Mark Kotsay	August 14, 2008	Atlanta Braves	National League	Chicago Cubs	
280	Cristian Guzmán	August 28, 2008	Washington Nationals	National League	Los Angeles Dodgers	
281	Stephen Drew	September 1, 2008	Arizona Diamondbacks	National League	St. Louis Cardinals	
282	Adrián Beltré^{†} (1)	September 1, 2008	Seattle Mariners	American League	Texas Rangers	
283	Orlando Hudson	April 13, 2009	Los Angeles Dodgers	National League	San Francisco Giants	
284	Ian Kinsler	April 15, 2009	Texas Rangers	American League	Baltimore Orioles	
285	Jason Kubel	April 17, 2009	Minnesota Twins	American League	Los Angeles Angels of Anaheim	
286	Michael Cuddyer (1)	May 22, 2009	Minnesota Twins	American League	Milwaukee Brewers	
287	Melky Cabrera	August 2, 2009	New York Yankees	American League	Chicago White Sox	
288	Troy Tulowitzki	August 10, 2009	Colorado Rockies	National League	Chicago Cubs	
289	Félix Pie	August 14, 2009	Baltimore Orioles	American League	Los Angeles Angels of Anaheim	
290	B. J. Upton	October 2, 2009	Tampa Bay Rays	American League	New York Yankees	
291	Jody Gerut	May 8, 2010	Milwaukee Brewers	National League	Arizona Diamondbacks	
292	Bengie Molina	July 16, 2010	Texas Rangers	American League	Boston Red Sox	
293	Kelly Johnson	July 23, 2010	Arizona Diamondbacks	National League	San Francisco Giants	
294	Carlos González	July 31, 2010	Colorado Rockies	National League	Chicago Cubs	
295	George Kottaras	September 3, 2011	Milwaukee Brewers	National League	Houston Astros	
296	Pablo Sandoval	September 15, 2011	San Francisco Giants	National League	Colorado Rockies	
297	Scott Hairston	April 27, 2012	New York Mets	National League	Colorado Rockies	
298	Aaron Hill (1)	June 18, 2012	Arizona Diamondbacks	National League	Seattle Mariners	
299	Aaron Hill (2)	June 29, 2012	Arizona Diamondbacks	National League	Milwaukee Brewers	
300	Adrián Beltré^{†} (2)	August 24, 2012	Texas Rangers	American League	Minnesota Twins	
301	Mike Trout^{‡}	May 21, 2013	Los Angeles Angels of Anaheim	American League	Seattle Mariners	
302	Brandon Barnes	July 19, 2013	Houston Astros	American League	Seattle Mariners	
303	Alex Ríos	September 23, 2013	Texas Rangers	American League	Houston Astros	
304	Michael Cuddyer (2)	August 17, 2014	Colorado Rockies	National League	Cincinnati Reds	
305	Brock Holt (1)	June 16, 2015	Boston Red Sox	American League	Atlanta Braves	
306	Shin-Soo Choo	July 21, 2015	Texas Rangers	American League	Colorado Rockies	
307	Adrián Beltré^{†} (3)	August 3, 2015	Texas Rangers	American League	Houston Astros	
308	Matt Kemp	August 14, 2015	San Diego Padres	National League	Colorado Rockies	
309	Freddie Freeman^{‡} (1)	June 15, 2016	Atlanta Braves	National League	Cincinnati Reds	
310	Rajai Davis^{R}	July 2, 2016	Cleveland Indians	American League	Toronto Blue Jays	
311	John Jaso	September 28, 2016	Pittsburgh Pirates	National League	Chicago Cubs	
312	Wil Myers	April 10, 2017	San Diego Padres	National League	Colorado Rockies	
313	Trea Turner^{‡} (1)	April 25, 2017	Washington Nationals	National League	Colorado Rockies	
314	Carlos Gómez (2)	April 29, 2017	Texas Rangers	American League	Los Angeles Angels of Anaheim	
315	Nolan Arenado^{‡} (1)	June 18, 2017	Colorado Rockies	National League	San Francisco Giants	
316	Cody Bellinger^{‡}	July 15, 2017	Los Angeles Dodgers	National League	Miami Marlins	
317	Evan Longoria	August 1, 2017	Tampa Bay Rays	American League	Houston Astros	
318	José Abreu	September 9, 2017	Chicago White Sox	American League	San Francisco Giants	
319	Mookie Betts^{‡}	August 9, 2018	Boston Red Sox	American League	Toronto Blue Jays	
320	Christian Yelich^{‡} (1)	August 29, 2018	Milwaukee Brewers	National League	Cincinnati Reds	
321	Christian Yelich^{‡} (2)	September 17, 2018	Milwaukee Brewers	National League	Cincinnati Reds	
322	Charlie Blackmon	September 30, 2018	Colorado Rockies	National League	Washington Nationals	
323	Brock Holt^{P} (2)	October 8, 2018 (Note: See also 2018 American League Division Series#Game 3.)	Boston Red Sox	American League	New York Yankees	
324	Jorge Polanco^{‡}	April 5, 2019	Minnesota Twins	American League	Philadelphia Phillies	
325	Shohei Ohtani^{‡}	June 13, 2019	Los Angeles Angels	American League	Tampa Bay Rays	
326	Jake Bauers^{‡}	June 14, 2019	Cleveland Indians	American League	Detroit Tigers	
327	Trea Turner^{‡} (2)	July 23, 2019	Washington Nationals	National League	Colorado Rockies	
328	Jonathan Villar^{‡}	August 5, 2019	Baltimore Orioles	American League	New York Yankees	
329	Cavan Biggio^{‡}	September 17, 2019	Toronto Blue Jays	American League	Baltimore Orioles	
330	Trea Turner^{‡} (3)	June 30, 2021	Washington Nationals	National League	Tampa Bay Rays	
331	Jake Cronenworth^{‡}	July 16, 2021	San Diego Padres	National League	Washington Nationals	
332	Freddie Freeman^{‡} (2)	August 18, 2021	Atlanta Braves	National League	Miami Marlins	
333	Eddie Rosario^{‡}	September 19, 2021	Atlanta Braves	National League	San Francisco Giants	
334	Christian Yelich^{‡} (3)	May 11, 2022	Milwaukee Brewers	National League	Cincinnati Reds	
335	Eduardo Escobar^{‡}	June 6, 2022	New York Mets	National League	San Diego Padres	
336	Jared Walsh^{‡}	June 11, 2022	Los Angeles Angels	American League	New York Mets	
337	Austin Hays^{‡}	June 22, 2022	Baltimore Orioles	American League	Washington Nationals	
338	Nolan Arenado^{‡} (2)	July 1, 2022	St. Louis Cardinals	National League	Philadelphia Phillies	
339	Luis Arráez^{‡}	April 11, 2023	Miami Marlins	National League	Philadelphia Phillies	
340	Cedric Mullins^{‡}	May 12, 2023	Baltimore Orioles	American League	Pittsburgh Pirates	
341	J. T. Realmuto^{‡}	June 12, 2023	Philadelphia Phillies	National League	Arizona Diamondbacks	
342	Elly De La Cruz^{‡}	June 23, 2023	Cincinnati Reds	National League	Atlanta Braves	
343	Jose Altuve^{‡}	August 28, 2023	Houston Astros	American League	Boston Red Sox	
344	Wyatt Langford^{‡}	June 30, 2024	Texas Rangers	American League	Baltimore Orioles	
345	Yordan Alvarez^{‡}	July 21, 2024	Houston Astros	American League	Seattle Mariners	
346	Xavier Edwards^{‡}	July 28, 2024	Miami Marlins	National League	Milwaukee Brewers	
347	Weston Wilson^{‡}	August 15, 2024	Philadelphia Phillies	National League	Washington Nationals	
348	Carson Kelly^{‡}	March 31, 2025	Chicago Cubs	National League	Athletics	
349	Byron Buxton^{‡}	July 12, 2025	Minnesota Twins	American League	Pittsburgh Pirates	
350	Pete Crow-Armstrong^{‡}^{R}	June 15, 2026	Chicago Cubs	National League	Colorado Rockies	
351	Bryce Harper^{‡}	June 20, 2026	Philadelphia Phillies	National League	New York Mets	
352	Tristan Peters^{‡}	July 10, 2026	Chicago White Sox	American League	Athletics	
353	JJ Bleday^{‡}	August 22, 2026	Cincinnati Reds	National League	Arizona Diamondbacks	

== Cycles by franchise ==
Bold text indicates the current name of an active MLB franchise; normal text indicates prior team names or defunct franchises. Teams are listed only as major league squads; minor league teams promoted to major-league status do not have minor league names or tenures listed. Table sorting is by larger number of cycles hit by each franchise, and then if tied, by smaller number of cycles allowed.

List of franchises, showing major-league seasons and numbers of cycles achieved and allowed
Franchise	Seasons	Cycles hit	Cycles allowed
Allegheny (AA) / Pittsburgh Alleghenys / **Pittsburgh Pirates**	1882–present	24	21
Boston Americans / **Boston Red Sox**	1901–present	23	13
New York Gothams / New York Giants / **San Francisco Giants**	1883–present	23	16
St. Louis Browns (AA/NL) / St. Louis Perfectos / **St. Louis Cardinals**	1882–present	20	24
Philadelphia Athletics / Kansas City Athletics / Oakland Athletics / **Athletics**	1901–present	17	10
Washington Senators (1901–1960) / **Minnesota Twins**	1901–present	16	13
New York Highlanders / **New York Yankees**	1903–present	15	11
Chicago White Stockings / Chicago Colts / Chicago Orphans / **Chicago Cubs**	1876–present	13	16
Washington Senators (1961–1971) / **Texas Rangers**	1961–present	12	7
Milwaukee Brewers (1901) / St. Louis Browns / **Baltimore Orioles**	1901–present	12	18
**New York Mets**	1962–present	11	5
Montreal Expos / **Washington Nationals**	1969–present	11	7
Philadelphia Quakers / Philadelphia Phils / **Philadelphia Phillies**	1883–present	11	19
Cincinnati Red Stockings (AA) / Cincinnati Redlegs / **Cincinnati Reds**	1882–present	11	20
Seattle Pilots / **Milwaukee Brewers**	1969–present	10	6
Houston Colt .45s / **Houston Astros**	1962–present	10	9
**Detroit Tigers**	1901–present	10	12
Brooklyn Atlantics / Brooklyn Grays / Brooklyn Grooms / Brooklyn Bridegrooms / Brooklyn Superbas / Brooklyn Robins / Brooklyn Dodgers / **Los Angeles Dodgers**	1883–present	10	14
Los Angeles Angels / California Angels / Anaheim Angels / Los Angeles Angels of Anaheim / **Los Angeles Angels**	1961–present	9	6
Boston Red Caps / Boston Beaneaters / Boston Doves / Boston Rustlers / Boston Bees / Boston Braves / Milwaukee Braves / **Atlanta Braves**	1876–present	9	10
**Colorado Rockies**	1993–present	9	11
Cleveland Blues / Cleveland Bronchos / Cleveland Naps / Cleveland Indians / **Cleveland Guardians**	1901–present	9	10
**Chicago White Sox**	1901–present	7	15
**Arizona Diamondbacks**	1998–present	6	5
**Kansas City Royals**	1969–present	6	7
Philadelphia Athletics (AA)	1882–1890	4	2
**Seattle Mariners**	1977–present	4	8
Washington Senators (1891–1899)	1891–1899	3	1
Detroit Wolverines	1881–1888	3	2
**Toronto Blue Jays**	1977–present	3	5
Louisville Eclipse / Louisville Colonels (AA/NL)	1882–1891	3	5
**San Diego Padres**	1969–present	3	7
Buffalo Bisons (NL)	1879–1885	2	0
St. Louis Maroons / Indianapolis Hoosiers	1884–1889	2	0
New York Metropolitans	1883–1887	2	2
Florida Marlins / **Miami Marlins**	1993–present	2	3
Tampa Bay Devil Rays / **Tampa Bay Rays**	1998–present	2	3
Kansas City Cowboys	1888–1889	1	0
Brooklyn Gladiators	1890	1	0
New York Giants (PL)	1890	1	0
Toledo Maumees	1890	1	0
Milwaukee Brewers (AA)	1891	1	0
Pittsburgh Rebels	1914–1915	1	0
Cleveland Forest Citys / Cleveland Blues (AA) / Cleveland Spiders	1887–1899	1	2
Providence Grays	1878–1885	0	1
Cleveland Blues (NL)	1879–1884	0	1
Buffalo Bisons (PL)	1890	0	1
Kansas City Packers	1914–1915	0	1
Syracuse Stars	1890	0	2
Baltimore Orioles (1882–1899)	1882–1899	0	3

Notes

- The Milwaukee Brewers were members of the American League through the 1997 season. The team then switched leagues due to an expansion-driven realignment of Major League Baseball's divisions. The Brewers have been members of the National League since 1998.
- The Houston Astros were members of the National League through the 2012 season. As part of the franchise's sale agreement, the team then switched leagues to create divisional balance. The Astros have been members of the American League since 2013.

== Cycles by stadiums ==
Bold text indicates the current name of an active MLB stadium; normal text indicates prior stadiums. Only cycles hit by major-league teams are listed, consistent with the prior section. All 30 current MLB stadiums are listed, along with a select few former major-league stadiums.

List of stadiums, showing major-league seasons, number of cycles, and most recent cycle
Ballpark	Seasons	Cycles	Most recent cycle		
Ballpark	Seasons	Cycles	Player, team	Date	Time since
**American Family Field**	2001–present	4	Xavier Edwards, Miami Marlins	July 28, 2024	2 years, 32 days
**Angel Stadium of Anaheim**	1966–present	7	Jared Walsh, Los Angeles Angels	June 11, 2022	4 years, 79 days
**Busch Stadium III**	2006–present	0	—	—	—
**Chase Field**	1998–present	6	JJ Bleday, Cincinnati Reds	August 22, 2026	7 days
**Citi Field**	2009–present	0	—	—	—
**Citizens Bank Park**	2004–present	7	Bryce Harper, Philadelphia Phillies	June 20, 2026	70 days
**Comerica Park**	2000–present	3	Jake Bauers, Cleveland Indians	June 14, 2019	7 years, 76 days
**Coors Field**	1995–present	18	Charlie Blackmon, Colorado Rockies	September 30, 2018	7 years, 333 days
**Daikin Park**	2000–present	6	Evan Longoria, Tampa Bay Rays	August 1, 2017	9 years, 28 days
**Dodger Stadium**	1962–present	2	Orlando Hudson, Los Angeles Dodgers	April 13, 2009	17 years, 138 days
**Fenway Park**	1912–present	18	Jose Altuve, Houston Astros	August 28, 2023	3 years, 1 day
Globe Life Park in Arlington	1994–2019	8	Carlos Gómez, Texas Rangers	April 29, 2017	9 years, 122 days
**Globe Life Field**	2020–present	0	—	—	—
**Great American Ball Park**	2003–present	4	Elly De La Cruz, Cincinnati Reds	June 23, 2023	3 years, 67 days
**Kauffman Stadium**	1973–present	4	Scott Cooper, Boston Red Sox	April 12, 1994	32 years, 139 days
**LoanDepot Park**	2012–present	2	Freddie Freeman, Atlanta Braves	August 18, 2021	5 years, 11 days
**Nationals Park**	2008–present	4	Jake Cronenworth, San Diego Padres	July 16, 2021	5 years, 44 days
Oakland Coliseum	1966–2024	2	Mark Ellis, Oakland Athletics	June 4, 2007	19 years, 86 days
**Oracle Park**	2000–present	2	Eddie Rosario, Atlanta Braves	September 19, 2021	4 years, 344 days
**Oriole Park at Camden Yards**	1992–present	7	Wyatt Langford, Texas Rangers	June 30, 2024	2 years, 60 days
**Petco Park**	2004–present	1	Eduardo Escobar, New York Mets	June 6, 2022	4 years, 84 days
**PNC Park**	2001–present	1	John Jaso, Pittsburgh Pirates	September 28, 2016	9 years, 335 days
**Progressive Field**	1994–present	0	—	—	—
**Rate Field**	1991–present	7	Tristan Peters, Chicago White Sox	July 10, 2026	50 days
**Rogers Centre**	1989–present	4	Mookie Betts, Boston Red Sox	August 9, 2018	8 years, 20 days
**Sutter Health Park**	2025–present	1	Carson Kelly, Chicago Cubs	March 31, 2025	1 year, 151 days
**T-Mobile Park**	1999–present	2	Yordan Alvarez, Houston Astros	July 20, 2024	2 years, 40 days
**Target Field**	2010–present	1	Byron Buxton, Minnesota Twins	July 12, 2025	1 year, 48 days
**Tropicana Field**	1998–present	3	Shohei Ohtani, Los Angeles Angels	June 13, 2019	7 years, 77 days
**Truist Park**	2017–present	0	—	—	—
Turner Field	1997–2017	2	Freddie Freeman, Atlanta Braves	June 15, 2016	10 years, 75 days
**Wrigley Field**	1914–present	11	Pete Crow-Armstrong, Chicago Cubs	June 15, 2026	75 days
**Yankee Stadium II**	2009–present	1	Brock Holt, Boston Red Sox	October 8, 2018	7 years, 325 days

== See also ==
- List of Nippon Professional Baseball players to hit for the cycle – the Japanese equivalent
- List of KBO players to hit for the cycle – the Korean equivalent
