= Carlisle (disambiguation) =

Carlisle is a city in Cumbria, England.

Carlisle may also refer to:

== Places ==
=== Antigua and Barbuda ===
- Carlisle, Antigua and Barbuda, in Saint George Parish

=== Australia ===
- Carlisle, Western Australia
- Carlisle River, Victoria

=== Canada ===
- Carlisle, Edmonton, Alberta
- Carlisle, Hamilton, Ontario
- Carlisle, Middlesex County, Ontario
- New Carlisle, Quebec

=== United Kingdom ===
- Carlisle, a city and the county town of Cumbria, England, United Kingdom
  - Carlisle (district, 1974–2023), a former local government entity with city status, including Carlisle, surrounding areas, and other towns, abolished in 2023
  - The County Borough of Carlisle, a former city and local government district located within the county of Cumberland (now Cumbria), England
  - Carlisle (constituency), centred on the city of Carlisle
  - Carlisle railway station, serving the urban settlement
  - Carlisle United F.C., a professional association football
- Carlisle Park, London
- Carlisle Park, Morpeth, Northumberland
- Port Carlisle, a coastal village in Cumbria

=== United States ===
- Carlisle, Alabama
- Carlisle, Arkansas
- Carlisle, Indiana
- Carlisle, Iowa
- Carlisle, Kentucky
- Carlisle, Louisiana
- Carlisle, Massachusetts
  - Carlisle Public Schools A small school district in Carlisle, Massachusetts
- Carlisle, Minnesota
- Carlisle Township, Otter Tail County, Minnesota
- Carlisle, Mississippi
- Carlisle, Michigan (disambiguation)
- Carlisle, Nebraska
- Carlisle, New York
- Carlisle, Ohio (in Warren and southern Montgomery counties)
- Carlisle Township, Ohio (in Lorain County)
- Carlisle, Oklahoma
- Carlisle, Noble County, Ohio
- Carlisle, Pennsylvania
  - Carlisle Indian Industrial School, a Native American boarding school located in Carlisle, Pennsylvania
- Carlisle, South Carolina
- Carlisle, Tennessee, see Tennessee State Route 49
- Carlisle, Texas
- Carlisle, West Virginia
- Carlisle County, Kentucky
- Mount Carlisle, Alaska
- New Carlisle, Indiana
- New Carlisle, Ohio

== Other uses ==
- Carlisle (surname)
- Carlisle (given name)
- The Carlisle Collection, an American fashion design company
- Carlisle Companies, an American company based in Arizona making materials for construction and transportation
- Earl of Carlisle, a title in the Peerage of England
- HMS Carlisle, three ships of the Royal Navy
- Carlisle Indian Industrial School
- Carlisle Indians football

== See also ==
- New Carlisle (disambiguation)
- Carlile (surname)
- Carlyle (disambiguation)
