= Carlyle (name) =

Carlyle is a given name and surname. Surname (and place name) is derived from Carlisle. Given name may be an elaboration of Carl. Notable people with the name include the following:

== Given name ==
- Carlyle Atkinson (1892–1968), English swimmer
- Carlyle Begay, Diné-American politician
- Carlyle Blackwell (1884–1955), American silent film actor, director and producer
- Carlyle Brown, American playwright, performer and the artistic director
- Carlyle W. Crane (1914–1992), American politician
- Carlyle Crockwell (1932–2015), Bermudian football referee
- Carlyle Eubank, American writer and screenwriter
- Carlyle Glean (1932–2021), Grenadian politician
- Carlyle Harmon (1905–1997), American inventor
- Carlyle Harris (1868–1893), American medical student
- Carlyle Holiday (born 1981), American football player
- Carlyle Jones (1904–1951), Australian rules footballer
- Carlyle A. Luer (1922–2019), American botanist
- Carlyle E. Maw (1903–1987), American politician
- Carlyle Miller (born 1930), Guyanese cricketer
- Carlyle Mitchell (born 1987), Trinidadian footballer
- Carlyle Moore Jr. (1909–1977), American actor
- Carlyle Tapsell (1909–1975), Indian field hockey player
- Carlyle Thompson (born 1988), Bahamian sprinter
- Carlyle Witton-Davies (1913–1993), Welsh Anglican priest and scholar

== Middle name ==
- Robert Carlyle Byrd, fullname of Robert Byrd (1917–2010), American politician
- Thomas Carlyle Ford, fullname of Tom Ford (born 1961), American fashion designer and filmmaker
- Thomas Johnstone Carlyle Gifford (1881–1975), Scottish businessperson
- Paige Carlyle Howard, fullname of Paige Howard (born 1985), American actress
- John Carlyle Kenley (1892–1965), Australian footballer (Australian rules)
- Todd Carlyle MacCulloch, fullname of Todd MacCulloch (born 1976), Canadian basketball player
- David Carlyle Rocastle, fullname of David Rocastle (1967–2001), English professional footballer

== Surname ==
- Aelred Carlyle (1874–1955), English Benedictine monk
- Alexander Carlyle (1722–1805), Scottish church leader
- Buddy Carlyle (born 1977), American baseball player
- Cleo Carlyle (1902–1967), American baseball player
- Jane Welsh Carlyle (1801–1866), Scottish writer
- Joan Carlyle (1931–2021), British soprano
- John Carlyle (disambiguation), several people
- Joseph Dacre Carlyle (1759–1804), British orientalist
- Florence Carlyle (1864–1923), Canadian painter
- Liz Carlyle (born 1958), American writer
- Mara Carlyle (born 1970s), British singer-songwriter and arranger
- Paul Carlyle (born 1967), Northern Irish footballer and manager
- Randy Carlyle (born 1956), Canadian ice hockey player and coach
- Reuven Carlyle (born 1965), American politician
- Richard Carlyle (1914–2009), American actor
- Richard Carlyle (actor, born 1879) (1879–1942), Canadian-born actor
- Robert Carlyle (born 1961), Scottish actor
- Roy Carlyle (1900–1956), American baseball player
- Steve Carlyle (born 1950), Canadian ice hockey player and coach
- Thomas Carlyle (1795–1881), Scottish essayist, historian and philosopher
- Thomas Carlyle (lawyer) (1803–1855), Scottish lawyer and apostle of the Catholic Apostolic Church
- Walter Carlyle (1938–2007), Scottish footballer
- Warren Carlyle, English theatre director and choreographer

== Fictional characters ==
- Boone Carlyle, fictional character on the television series Lost
- Luke Carlyle, a Marvel Comic Book character
- Lucy Carlyle, main protagonist of the YA book series Lockwood & Co. by Jonathan Stroud

== See also ==
- Carlile (given name)
- Carlile (surname)
- Carlyle (disambiguation)
