= Carlyle =

Carlyle may refer to:

== Places ==
- Carlyle, Illinois, a US city
- Carlyle Lake - a lake in Illinois, US
- Carlyle, Kansas, an unincorporated place in the US
- Carlyle, Montana, a ghost town in the US
- Carlyle, Saskatchewan, a Canadian town, including:

Carlyle Airport and
Carlyle station

- Carlyle Lake Resort, Saskatchewan, a Canadian hamlet
- Carlyle Hotel, New York City
- Carlyle Restaurant, New York City
- The Carlyle, a residential condominium in Minneapolis, Minnesota
- The Carlyle (Pittsburgh), a residential condominium in Pittsburgh, Pennsylvania

== Name ==
- Carlyle (name)
  - Carlyle (given name)
  - Carlyle (surname)

== Other uses ==
- The Carlyle Group, a private equity company based in the US
- Carlyle Works, a former bus bodybuilder in the UK

== See also ==
- Carlisle (disambiguation)
- Carlile (disambiguation)
- Carlyne
