= Carlyle (given name) =

Carlyle is a masculine English-language given name. It may refer to:

- Carlyle Atkinson (1892–1968), English swimmer
- Carlyle W. Crane (1914–1992), American politician
- Carlyle Crockwell (1932–2015), Bermudian football referee
- Carlyle Eubank, American writer and screenwriter
- Carlyle Guimarães (1926–1982), Brazilian footballer
- Carlyle Harmon (1905–1997), American inventor
- Carlyle Kenley (1892–1965), Australian footballer (Australian rules)
- Carlyle E. Maw (1903–1987), American politician
- Carlyle Mitchell (born 1987), Trinidadian footballer
- Carlyle Tapsell (1909–1975), Indian field hockey player
- Carlyle Witton-Davies (1913–1993), Welsh Anglican priest and scholar

== See also ==
- Carlile (given name)
