= Carlile =

Carlile may refer to:

- Carlile (given name)
- Carlile (surname)
- Carlile baronets
- Carlile Shale, a geologic formation in the central-western United States
- Carlile Transportation, a transportation company based in Anchorage, Alaska, U.S.

== See also ==
- Carlisle (disambiguation)
