= Carlisle (surname) =

Carlisle is an English habitational surname related to the city of Carlisle. Notable people with the surname include:

- Alexandra Carlisle (1886–1936), English actress
- Anthony Carlisle (1768–1840), surgeon and discover of electrolysis
- Belinda Carlisle (born 1958), American singer, of the Go-Go's
- Bob Carlisle (born 1956), American Christian singer
- Clarke Carlisle (born 1979), English footballer
- Cliff Carlisle (1903–1983), American singer
- Cooper Carlisle (born 1977), American Football player with the Oakland Raiders
- Elsie Carlisle (1896–1977), English singer, popular in the 1920s and 1930s
- Geno Carlisle (born 1976), American basketball player
- James Carlisle (born 1937), former Governor-General of Antigua and Barbuda
- Jodi Carlisle (born 1960), American actress
- John Carlisle (disambiguation):
  - John Carlisle (actor) (1935–2011), British television and stage actor
  - John Carlisle Kilgo (1861–1922), American Methodist bishop
  - John Carlisle (British politician) (1942–2019), Conservative MP
  - John Griffin Carlisle (1834–1910), late 19th century Democratic Party politician in America
- Kenneth Carlisle (born 1941), British Conservative MP
- Kitty Carlisle (1910–2007), American singer, actress and spokeswoman for the arts
- Lindsey Carlisle (born 1969), South African field hockey player
- Lucas Carlisle (born 1988), English cricketer
- Mark Carlisle (1929–2005), British Conservative Cabinet member and MP
- Mary Carlisle (1914–2018), American actress and singer
- Mary Helen Carlisle (1869–1925), British painter
- Mary Jane Goodson Carlisle (1835–1905), political spouse from Kentucky
- Michael Carlisle (born 1929), British engineer and public servant
- Orville Carlisle (1917–1988), American inventor of model rocketry
- Peter Carlisle (born 1952), the Prosecuting Attorney of Honolulu, Hawaii
- Phyllis Cook Carlisle (1912–1954), Canadian architect
- Rick Carlisle (born 1959), American basketball player and coach
- Stuart Carlisle (born 1972), Zimbabwean cricketer

== See also ==
- Carlisle (disambiguation)
- Earl of Carlisle
- Carlyle (surname)
- Carlile (surname)
