= Carlisle (given name) =

Carlisle is a given name related to Carlyle. It may refer to the following notable people:

- Carlisle Adams, Canadian cryptographer and computer security researcher
- Carlisle Best (born 1959), Barbadian former cricketer
- Carlisle Cullen, fictional character in The Twilight Series by Stephenie Meyer
- Carlisle Floyd (1926–2021), American composer
- Carlisle Graham (1850 – 1909), American athlete
- Carlisle W. Higgins (1889–1980), American jurist
- Carlisle H. Humelsine (1915 – 1989), American diplomat and military office
- Carlisle Jarvis (1906 – 1979), Australian rules footballer
- Carlisle Moody (born 1943), American economist, criminologist, and professor
- Carlisle Perry (1893 – 1953), American baseball player
- Carlisle Runge (1920–1983), American lawyer and diplomat
- Carlisle Trost (1930–2020), American navy officer

== See also ==
- Carlile (given name)
- Carlisle (surname)
- Carlyle (name)
- Jordan Carlisle Jackson Jr. (1848–1918) American attorney, Republican party delegate, Black community leader
