= Cat train =

A Cat train is a train of one or more supply sleds/sleighs hauled by a continuous track vehicle, and is typically used in roadless areas. They are so named for the caterpillar tracks of the hauling vehicle.

In northern climates, they were used to haul supplies to isolated communities in winter before engineers such as John Denison created modern winter roads which enabled standard winterized semi-trucks and trailers to haul these loads and heavier freight.

Cat trains are still used in areas where winter roads cannot be built, such as along the Hudson Bay, as seen in Season 9 of Ice Road Truckers.
