= Darrell Ward =

American reality television personality

- Born: August 13, 1964; Deer Lodge, Montana
- Died: August 28, 2016 (aged 52); Clinton, Montana, US
- Occupation: Trucker
- Known for: Ice Road Truckers
- Spouse: Gwen Ward (married ?-2012)
- Children: 2

Darrell Ward (August 13, 1964 – August 28, 2016) was an American reality television personality. He was a truck driver featured on Ice Road Truckers from season six in 2012 until his death. He was from Deer Lodge, Montana.

Darrell took the trucking career since he was 16. Prior to the show Darrel worked as an independent trucker with his own business in Montana and during winter times was often working in Alaska with other companies such as Alaska West Express.

On the show Darrel took the opportunity to work with Carlile Transportation during the 2012 winter, being this his first main appearance on the show. Later worked for Polar Industries in Canada (2013-2014) and founded his own company alongside Lisa Kelly during the 2014-2016 seasons. After his death this company would be run by Lisa alone and his son Reno Ward 'till the end of the 2017 winter season.

Before his first main appearance on the show's season six, Darrell was invited by his cousin Jim Ward, show's art director for season four, to drive the Kenworth W900 spotted on the video for the series promotion and opening sequence, up the Beartooth Pass in north Wyoming.

On August 28, 2016, Ward died in a plane crash while travelling in a single-engined Cessna 182 Skylane with pilot Mark Melotz. They had departed from Missoula 53 minutes prior to the crash and were attempting to land at a nearby airstrip in Clinton, Montana. The National Transportation Safety Board concluded the cause of the accident to be "The sudden right turn on approach to landing for reasons that could not be determined because a post-accident examination did not reveal any anomalies that would have precluded normal operation."
