= Carlyle (surname) =

Carlyle is an English-language surname, a sept of Scottish Clan Bruce.

== People ==
- Aelred Carlyle (1874–1955), English Benedictine monk
- Alexander Carlyle (1722–1805), Scottish church leader
- Alexander James Carlyle (1861–1943), British cleric, historian and social reformer
- Allyson Carlyle (1954–2020), American library and information scientist
- Buddy Carlyle (born 1977), American baseball pitcher and coach
- Cleo Carlyle (1902–1967), American baseball player
- David Carlyle (born 1988), Scottish actor
- Doug Carlyle (1954–2017), Canadian dirt-modified racing driver
- E. I. Carlyle (Edward Irving Carlyle) (1871–1952), British author and historian
- Florence Carlyle (1864–1923), Canadian painter
- F. Ertel Carlyle (Frank Ertel Carlyle) (1897–1960), American politician from North Carolina
- Grace Carlyle (1877–1953), American stage and film actress
- Irving E. Carlyle (Irving Edward Carlyle) (1896–1971), American lawyer and politician
- Jane Welsh Carlyle (1801–1866), Scottish writer, spouse of Thomas Carlyle
- Joan Carlyle (1931–2021), Welsh operatic soprano
- John Carlyle (merchant) (1720–1780), Scottish merchant in Virginia
- Johnny Carlyle (1929–2017), British ice hockey player and coach
- Joseph Dacre Carlyle (1759–1804), British cleric, academic and orientalist
- Kanaan Carlyle (born 2004), American basketball player
- Liz Carlyle (born 1958), American writer of romance novels
- Mara Carlyle (born 1974/5), British singer-songwriter and arranger
- Paul Carlyle (born 1967), Northern Irish footballer and manager
- Randy Carlyle (born 1956), Canadian ice hockey player and coach
- Reuven Carlyle (born 1965), American businessman and politician
- Richard Carlyle (1914–2009), American actor
- Richard Carlyle (actor, born 1879) (1879–1942), Canadian-born actor
- Robert Carlyle (born 1961), Scottish actor
- Robert Warrand Carlyle (1859–1934), British colonial administrator and medieval historian
- Roy Carlyle (1900–1956), American baseball player
- Ryan Carlyle (born 1989), American rugby sevens player
- Spike Carlyle (born 1993), American mixed martial artist
- Steve Carlyle (born 1950), Canadian ice hockey player and coach
- Thomas Carlyle (1795–1881), Scottish essayist and historian
- Thomas Carlyle (lawyer) (1803–1855), Scottish lawyer and apostle of the Catholic Apostolic Church
- Walter Carlyle (1938–2007), Scottish footballer
- Warren Carlyle, English theatre director and choreographer
- William Carlyle (died 1329) was a Scottish nobleman

== Characters ==
- Boone Carlyle, fictional character on the television series Lost
- Luke Carlyle, a Marvel Comic Book character
- Lucy Carlyle, main protagonist of the YA book series Lockwood & Co. by Jonathan Stroud

== See also ==
- Carlisle (surname)
- Carlile (surname)
