= Down in Mississippi =

Down in Mississippi may refer to:

- Down in Mississippi, album by blues guitarist J. B. Lenoir and title song with Fred Below on drums
- Down in Mississippi, song performed by Jimmy Reed
- Down in Mississippi, song recorded by Pops Staples
- Down in Mississippi, a song recorded by Mavis Staples on her 2007 album We'll Never Turn Back, written by J. B. Lenoir
- Down in Mississippi (Up to No Good), a song by Sugarland
- Down in Mississippi a 2008 play by Carlyle Brown
