= Lisa Kelly =

Lisa Kelly may refer to:

- Lisa Kelly (singer) (born 1977), Irish singer
- Lisa Kelly (trucker) (born 1980), American truck driver
- Lisa Robin Kelly (1970–2013), American actress

== See also ==
- Kelly (surname)
