= John Carlile =

John Carlile may refer to:

- John S. Carlile (1817–1878), United States Senator from Virginia
- John Charles Carlile (?–1941), British Baptist minister.
- John Carlile (footballer) (born 1942), Australian rules footballer for South Melbourne

== See also ==
- John Carlisle (disambiguation)
- John Carlyle (disambiguation)
