= Crescent Area Historic District =

- U.S. National Register of Historic Places
- U.S. Historic district
- New Jersey Register of Historic Places
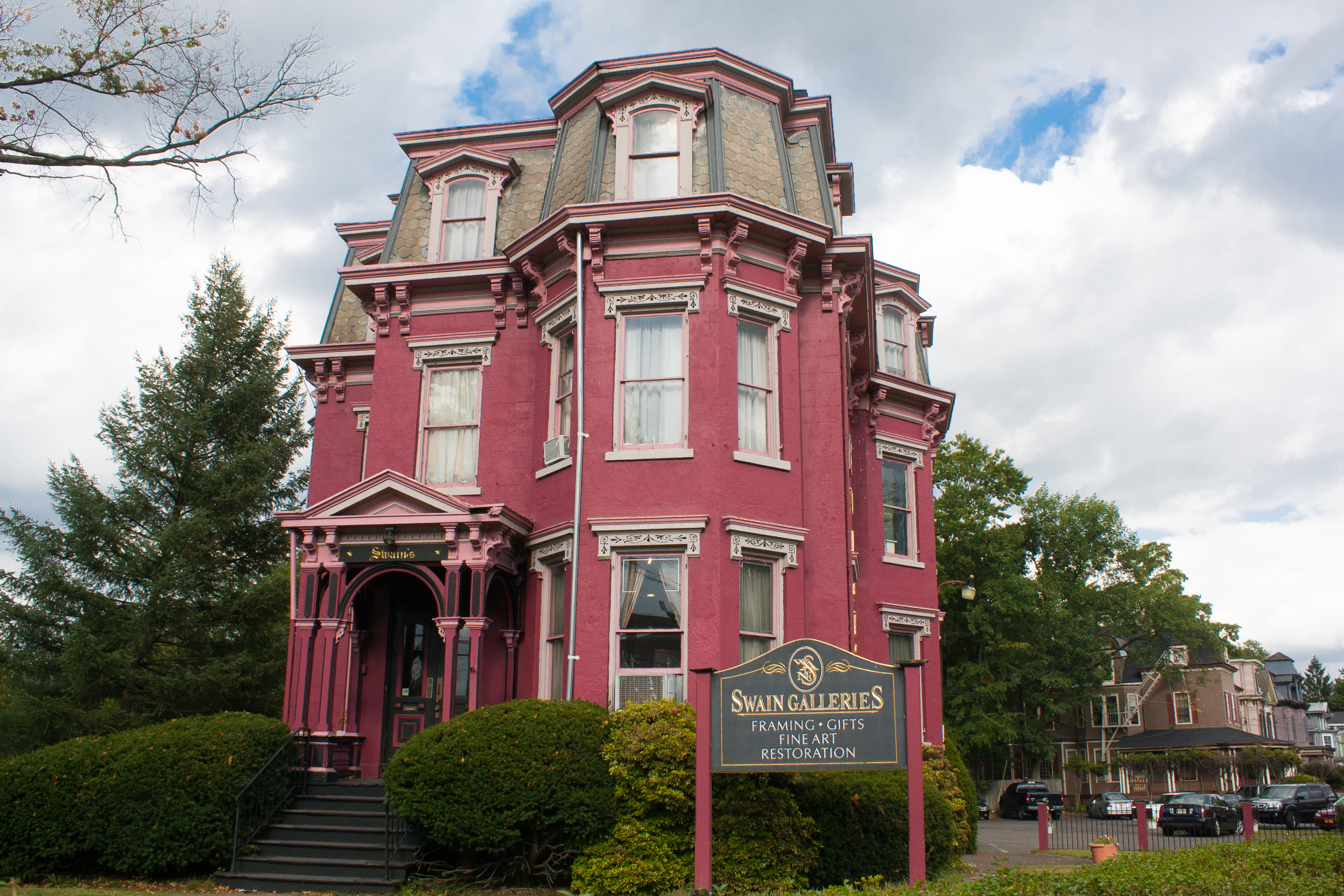
- Swains Galleries at 703 Watchung Avenue

- Location within Union County, New Jersey Location within New Jersey Location within the United States
- Location: Roughly bounded by Park, Prospect, and Carnegie Avenues, 7th and Richmond Streets; Plainfield, New Jersey
- Coordinates: 40°36′35″N 74°25′6″W
- Area: 47 acres (19 ha)
- Architectural style: Second Empire, Italianate, Queen Anne
- NRHP reference No.: 80002523
- NJRHP No.: 2694

Significant dates
- Added to NRHP: December 12, 1980
- Designated NJRHP: October 15, 1980

The Crescent Area Historic District is a 47-acre (19 ha) historic district located in the city of Plainfield in Union County, New Jersey. It was added to the National Register of Historic Places on December 12, 1980 for its significance in architecture, featuring Victorian houses built from 1870 to 1900. The district includes 111 contributing buildings.

== History and description ==
The area was initially developed by philanthropist Job Male, who moved to Plainfield in 1867, and would become the first major of the city in 1869. He designed and built several of the houses in the district and lived on Crescent Avenue.

The Crescent Avenue Presbyterian Church is located at the intersection of Crescent Avenue, Watchung Avenue, and 7th Street on land donated by Male. It was built in 1871 with English Gothic style. Fire damaged the church in 1888 and 1931. Swains Galleries at 703 Watchung Avenue was built c. 1870 and features Second Empire style, as seen in its mansard roof. The Goddard House at 213 East Ninth Street was built c. 1890 and features a domed tower and a variety of styles, including Queen Anne and Richardsonian Romanesque.

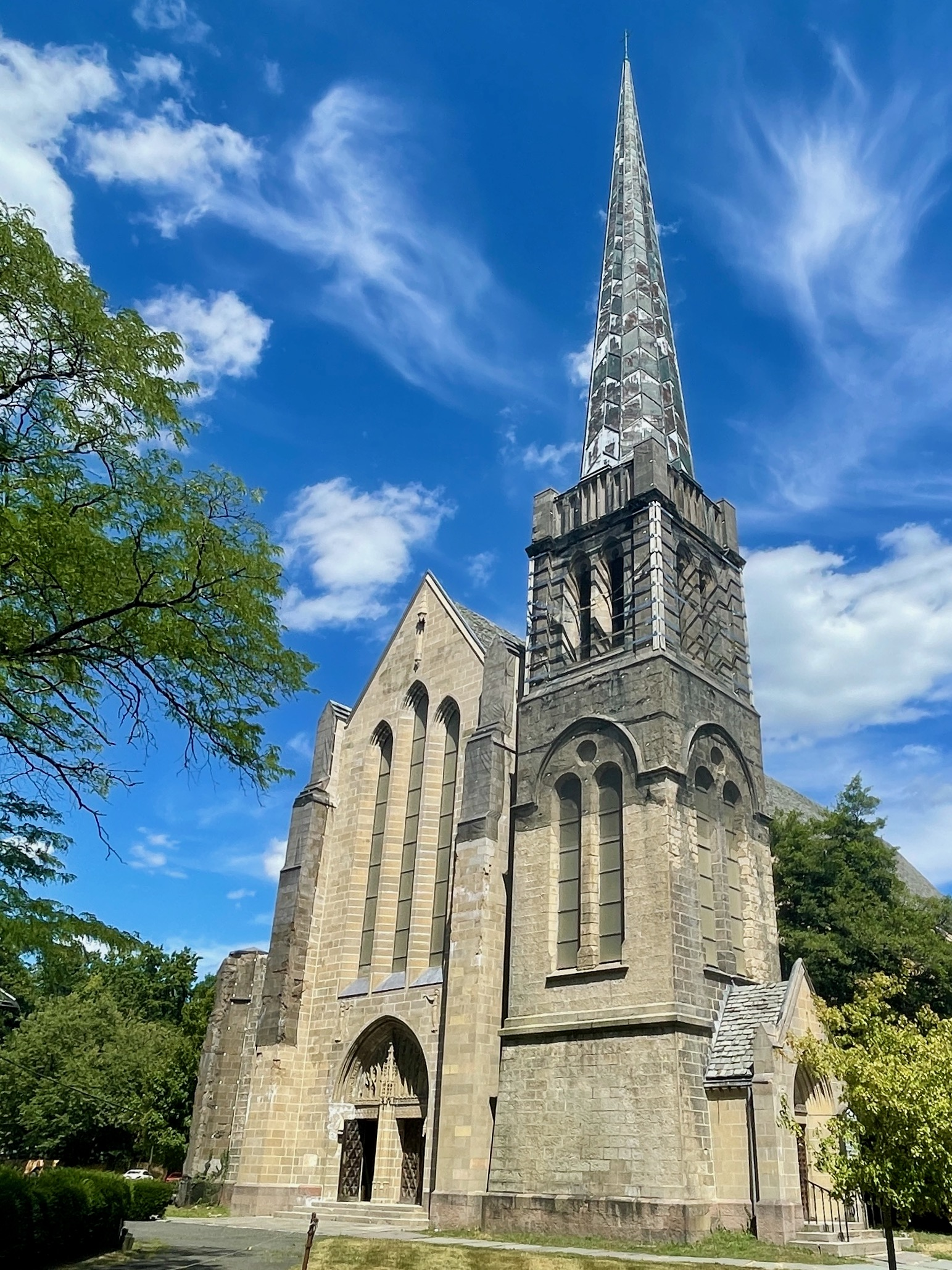
Crescent Avenue Presbyterian Church

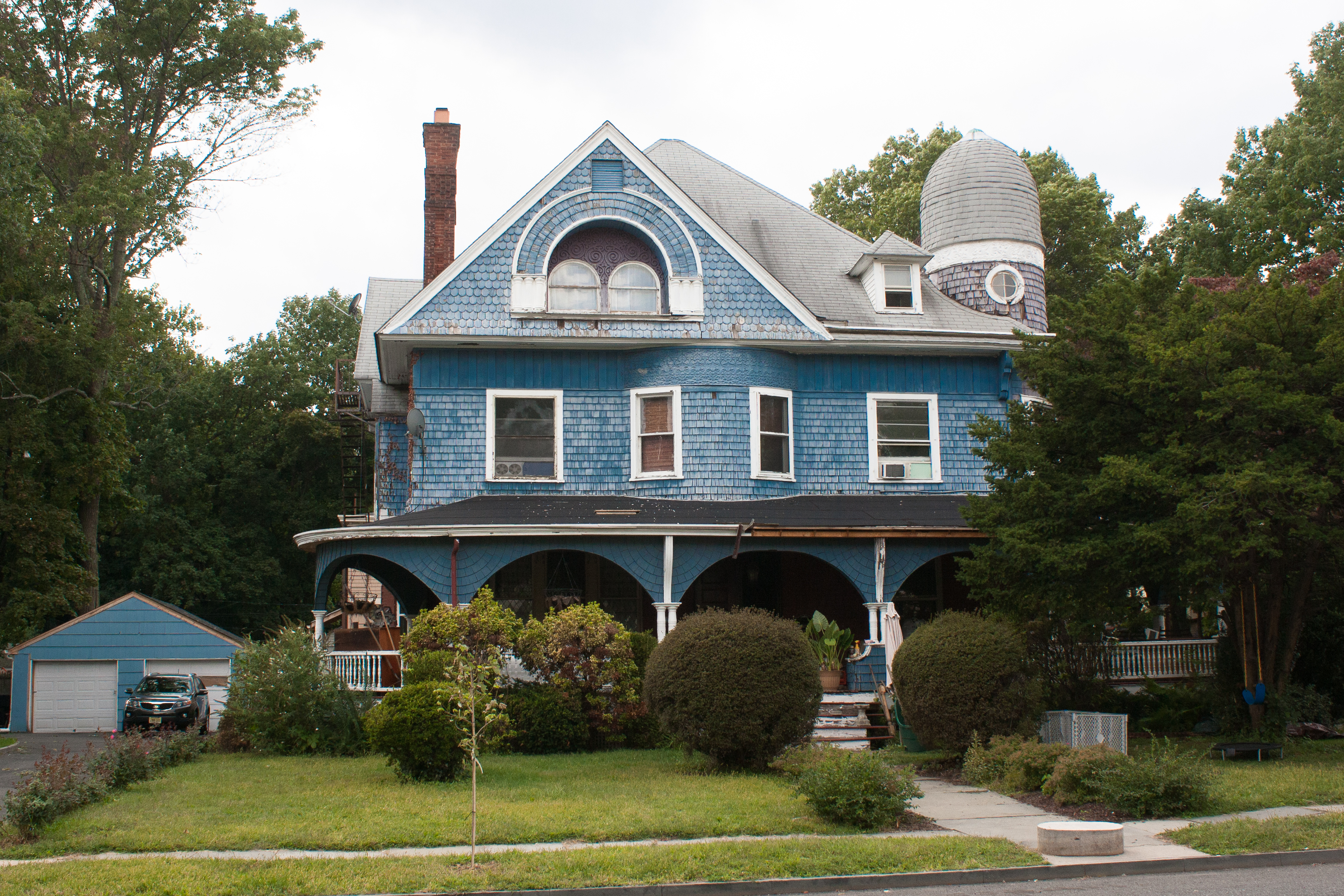
Goddard House at 213 East Ninth Street

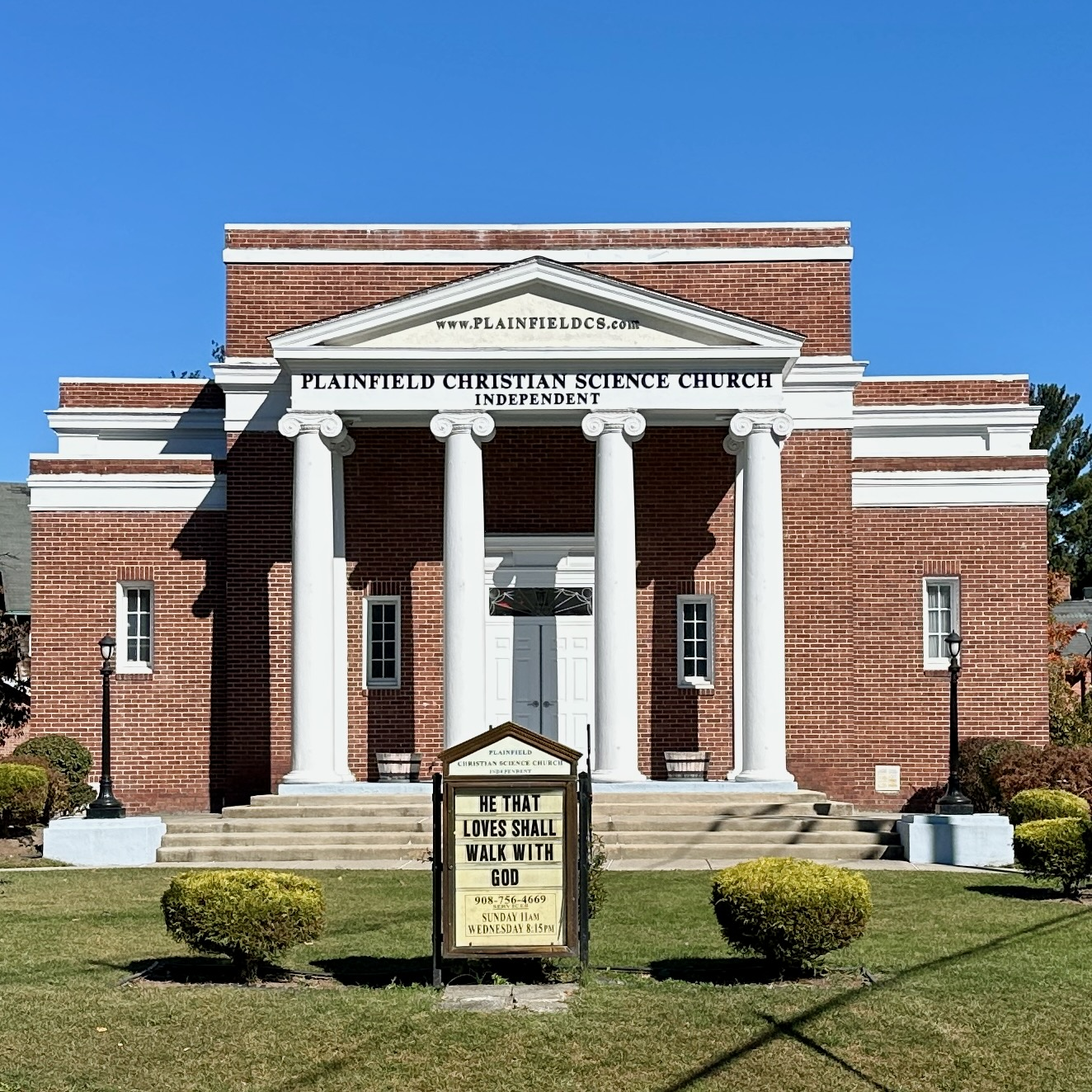
Plainfield Christian Science Church

== See also ==
- National Register of Historic Places listings in Union County, New Jersey
