= List of IRT: Deadliest Roads episodes =

This is a list of TV episodes for the History Channel reality TV series IRT: Deadliest Roads, a spinoff series of Ice Road Truckers.

== Series overview ==
Season	Episodes	Originally released	
Season	Episodes	First released	Last released
1	10	October 3, 2010	December 5, 2010
2	13	September 25, 2011	December 18, 2011

== Episodes ==
=== Season 1 ===
No. overall	No. in season	Title	Original release date
1	1	"Freefall Freeway"	October 3, 2010
Ice Road Truckers Alex Debogorski, Rick Yemm, and Lisa Kelly make a living driving the deadly ice roads of North America, but they've never seen anything like this. To prove they're the best drivers in the world, the truckers head to India to take on the extreme mountain roads of the Himalayas. As Lisa battles the heat and struggles to make the transition from Alaska, Alex slams into not one, but two vehicles out on the crowded roadways. Rick risks a head-on collision with multiple buses that refuse to give up an inch of road as they fly toward him at top speed. Note: this is the only episode with Alex Debogorski, who leaves for home after his first day in India's driving conditions.
2	2	"Pushed to the Ledge"	October 11, 2010
After surviving their first few days in India, the truckers face the most dangerous journey of their lives. Rick and Lisa go deeper into the Himalayas and up a new stretch of road called The Ledge--a one lane cliff-side path with a rock wall on one side and a sheer thousand-foot drop on the other. On the perilous journey up, Rick is bullied by local drivers, and Lisa panics while being forced to the edge of a cliff. Alabama highway trucker Dave Redmon joins the team and quickly has the most terrifying ride of his career. With one trucker already beaten by these roads, one of these three veterans may be the next to surrender.
3	3	"Facing Fears"	October 17, 2010
Alabama trucker Dave Redmon stares down the notorious Freefall Freeway in a truck that is in horrible need of repair. Roadside maintenance costs him valuable time and he must face driving the roads with terrifying drop-offs at night or risk being late with his very first load. Lisa heads back up to The Ledge, the narrow stretch of road that caused her to quit the last time she drove it. But this time, a flat tire leaves her teetering on the edge of the abyss. And the crowded roads finally bring Rick to the breaking point. The oncoming traffic sends him into an angry fit on the side of the road and when his greatest rival--the aggressive bus driver--attempts to pass him on a narrow stretch, Rick refuses to back down, even with oncoming traffic bearing down on them both.
4	4	"Death is a Blind Corner Away"	October 24, 2010
When the mountain begins to crumble underfoot, Lisa is in grave danger with an oversized nine-ton load in tow. The unstable road gives way and claims its first victims. Fearing the worst about Lisa, Rick gets news from home that forces him to make a decision that will determine his fate in the Himalayas. Dave's close scrape with the side of an oncoming bus causes the angry occupants to surround his vehicle in a showdown on a narrow ledge, a thousand feet up.
5	5	"Crumbling Roads"	October 31, 2010
After receiving more good news from home, Rick decides to stay. He and Lisa drive higher into the Himalayas than ever before with fragile statues of a Hindu goddess. Rockslides and tight roads force the drivers into dangerous situations, and risk breaking the sacred statue--making the whole trip worthless. Dave tackles the notorious "Ledge" for the first time, all while dealing with an oversized load and oncoming traffic.
6	6	"Thin Air"	November 7, 2010
After conquering the Freefall Freeway, the Cutouts, and the Ledge, all three drivers climb higher, to over 13,000 feet, as they tackle the Rohtang Pass for the first time. Rick delivers a sacred Buddha statue between monasteries. Lisa brings much needed supplies into Keylong--a city normally cut off by snowy winters. Now the snow's melting, and roads are falling apart under rivers and gushing waterfalls.
7	7	"Cut Off!"	November 14, 2010
After a severe storm strands Rick, Lisa, and Dave in Keylong, Rick leads the charge back over the Rohtang Pass, betting against Mother Nature and the dangerous road. Dave and Rick deal with an aggressive Indian driver, and after the drivers hit their boiling point, they all get caught in a landslide.
8	8	"Overloaded!"	November 21, 2010
Tensions hit a high point between Lisa her spotter Tashi, forcing Lisa to think about saying goodbye to Tashi and forging ahead alone. Dave's forced to stop in the middle of his run to deal with his overweight load. Rick battles through illness to make his trip on time, giving everything he can into delivering on time.
9	9	"Pile of Corpses"	November 28, 2010
A snowstorm threatens to cut the drivers' runs short atop the Rohtang pass. Rick's spotter Boyo leaves Rick for a better job, forcing Rick to go it alone. Lisa and Dave drive as fast as they can to beat the storm, but are slowed by mobs of people on the pass. All three drivers get caught driving in darkness and Lisa battles fatigue--struggling to stay awake.
10	10	"Explosive Cargo"	December 5, 2010
As the season comes to a close, the drivers have one last assignment, and it's their most dangerous and important: deliver barrels of aviation fuel for helicopter rescue missions. Rick and Lisa are going on alone, with no spotters to help on the snowy roads. Dave learns he's not out of the woods yet and gets in yet another accident. And at the end, only one driver completes the final load.

=== Season 2 ===
No. overall	No. in season	Title	Original release date
11	1	"The Death Road"	September 25, 2011
Three teams of North American truckers take on South America's Andes Mountains, where they're out to prove they have what it takes to haul any load over any road. Veterans and rookie drivers alike will have to battle thick Amazon jungles, landslides, and cliffside routes where any mistake can be fatal. It's only the first trip, but already the roads are forcing even the most seasoned veterans to second-guess their decision to challenge "The Death Road."
12	2	"Rise of the Rookies"	October 2, 2011
Patience and tempers are stretched to the limits on the Bolivian Death Road day after day. Dave and Lisa deal with their malfunctioning truck, racing against the clock to make sure they can still deliver their load on time. Hugh and Rick battle both the international language barrier and muddy roads as tempers boil. Inexperience catches up to rookies Tim and Tino, where they'll have to second-guess their ability to drive the deadly, cliffside roads. And at the end of the day, two truckers, pushed to their limits, call it quits.
13	3	"Lisa vs. The Devil's Bridge"	October 9, 2011
After two veteran truckers give up and head home, Hugh Rowland and Lisa Kelly are forced to take on the Death Road without spotters. Lisa moves to the Southern Death Road, where she faces her biggest challenge so far--alone. The rookie team of Tim and Tino have to navigate treacherous cliffs as well as tight fits in town, where navigating around cars and buildings may prove as challenging as dodging landslides, all to get their load to a community in need.
14	4	"The Replacement Trucker"	October 16, 2011
Trucker Lisa Kelly gets a look at her new partner, Texan long-hauler G.W. Boles, and G.W. gets a look at some of the deadliest roads on the planet in his first outing as Lisa's spotter. Hugh Rowland, still trucking solo, does his best not to play demolition derby in a local market with his giant truck. Rookie Tim Zickuhr gets his first shot at the Death Road, and with rookie spotter Tino Rodriguez riding shotgun, the young team struggles to keep their over-sized load from falling off the truck, or worse, pulling them off the cliff.
15	5	"Death Race"	October 23, 2011
The rookie team of Tim and Tino are feeling more confident than ever, and are out to prove they can drive with the veterans by challenging trucker Hugh Rowland to a race down the Death Road. But Hugh isn't ready to hand over his title as "fastest man," and is forced to make up lost time and miles on one of the deadliest roads on the planet. Lisa Kelly settles in with new partner G.W. Boles, doing whatever they can to deliver their load--local crops and the farmers that grew them--to market in time.
16	6	"The Flattest Place on Earth"	October 30, 2011
Taking a break from the high-mountain passes, Lisa and G.W. take a load of live animals over the world's largest salt flat, where they'll have to rely on a faulty GPS and a bit of luck to find their way across one of the flattest places on Earth. Tim and Tino take on the death road, and Tim's out for a new, high-adrenaline experience, finding there's plenty of room to ride on the roof of the truck. Hugh's gone about just as far as he can, too, finally learning that you can't deliver your load any faster if you don't keep your truck on the road.
17	7	"Oxygen Required"	November 6, 2011
All three trucking teams get a little entertainment in on the side when truckers Tim Zickuhr and G.W. Boles show what they've got in a Bolivian Cholita Wrestling ring. Back on the road, it's the team's last chance to prove they have what it takes to conquer the death road before moving on to Peru. Lisa again relegates G.W. to the spotter's role, still hesitant to let him take the wheel. As Tino and Tim climb higher and higher into the mountains, their emergency tank of oxygen comes in handy. Hugh struggles with the altitude and attitude trying to get his truck through tight squeezes and narrow roads. Finally, all the drivers meet up for dinner and recount their weeks on Bolivia's Death Road.
18	8	"Desert Disaster"	November 13, 2011
The three teams of truckers leave Bolivia in their dust as they make tracks for Peru's deadly Andes Mountains passageways. Lisa Kelly finally hands the reins over to G.W. Boles, and he's ready to prove he's got what it takes on some of the worst roads on the planet but he nearly goes over the edge. A road race between Hugh Rowland and the rookie team of Tim Zickuhr and Tino Rodriguez leaves both teams on the side of the road with mechanical failures, but while Hugh's able to find a quick fix, "T and T" are left stranded overnight in the desert.
19	9	"The Hangover"	November 20, 2011
Lisa Kelly and G.W. take on the same road that almost sent G.W. over the edge the day before, but now, with Lisa behind the wheel and a heavier load, the same mountain's rigged with demolition dynamite and ready to explode. Hugh gets his old truck back and hauls a load of sheep through the dark Peruvian night, where sharp switchbacks and cliffs come out of nowhere. A rough day for Tino means partner Tim is forced to drive and maneuver on his own, and Tim learns how quickly he can go from "hero" to "zero."
20	10	"Dead Man's Canyon"	November 27, 2011
Trucker Hugh Rowland takes on an old donkey trail with some dynamite during his nearly impossible climb into the Andes. The trucking team of Lisa Kelly and G.W. Boles drive head-first into "Dead Nun Canyon," praying their truck isn't too big for the miles and miles of hand-carved tunnels in front of them. Tim Zickuhr and Tino Rodriguez aim to take on the canyons as well... if their mishaps don't stop them cold again.
21	11	"King of the Road"	December 4, 2011
The truckers tackle the Peruvian Andes with their most fragile loads yet. G.W. takes a turn behind the wheel as he and Lisa tackle "Dead Nun Canyon" with a load of dinosaurs too tall for the tiny tunnels. Rookies Tim and Tino challenge veteran Hugh Rowland for his self-proclaimed "King of the Road" title, and they're willing to trade words--and paint--to beat Hugh this time around.
22	12	"Landslide!"	December 11, 2011
The rookie team of Tino Rodriguez and Tim Zickuhr haul barrels of gasoline over roads wired with dynamite, and Tim's ready to challenge local police to get the job done. Lisa and G.W. have to cross treacherous, decaying bridges to get to their destination, and hope the boards can hold their truck out of the raging rivers below. Hugh races the clock--transporting a truck full of perishable, frozen fish--and braves a dangerous, cliff-side short-cut.
23	13	"Bull Run"	December 18, 2011
On their last runs in Peru, all three trucking teams are charged with delivering loads to a large, local festival, high into the Andes. Lisa and G.W. haul a load of bulls, some of which have G.W. running and diving out the bulls horns' reach. Veteran Hugh Rowland hauls a truck full of fireworks and firework towers, forcing his truck through fire and flames in the process. Tim and Tino also haul bulls, and Tim tests his speed in the ring against the dangerous animals.
