= Lisa Kelly (trucker) =

American truck driver and reality TV personality

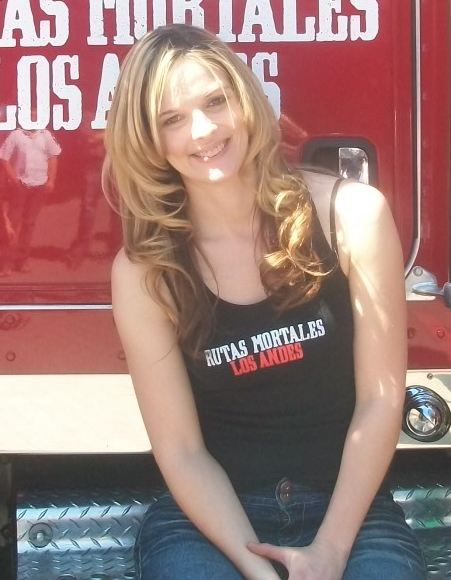
- Kelly in Chile.
- Born: December 8, 1980 (age 45); Grand Rapids, Michigan, U.S.
- Occupation: Trucker
- Known for: Ice Road Truckers; IRT: Deadliest Roads
- Spouse: Traves (Travis) Kelly (m. 2008)

Lisa Kelly (born December 8, 1980) is an American trucker who has been featured on the History channel reality television series Ice Road Truckers where drivers make their way along the icy Dalton Highway from Fairbanks to Prudhoe Bay, frequently hauling "oversized" loads. Kelly was featured as part of the main cast during seasons 3–5 (2009-2011) and 7–12 (2013-2017; 2025) Kelly has also made appearances in Seasons 1–2 of spin-off series IRT: Deadliest Roads. Kelly was notable as the only female trucker featured in the series until Maya Sieber joined in Season 5, and Stephanie "Steph" Custance in season 10. Originally from Grand Rapids, Michigan, she now resides in Wasilla, Alaska.

== Early life ==
Kelly was born on December 8, 1980, in Grand Rapids, Michigan. Her family moved to a mini farm in Sterling, Alaska, when she was six years old. She returned to Grand Rapids for college, attending Cornerstone University for one semester before deciding it was not for her.

== Career ==
Prior to her appointment as an Ice Road Trucker, Kelly worked as a school bus driver and motocross rider. She also worked at gas stations, and a pizza company and was a state freestyle motocross champion. After these ventures, she decided to settle on a long term-career and trained as a trucker because it 'looked interesting'. She subsequently got a job driving for Carlile Transportation, an Alaskan haulage company. Being a woman, Kelly says this was a difficult achievement. "I had to work twice as hard. I had to pull my weight and everybody else's and get the job done as fast, or faster."

== TV appearances ==
Kelly is one of the truckers for the History Channel's Ice Road Truckers. She first appeared in season 3 (Seasons 1 and 2 had been set in Canada) in 2009, as the only woman. She subsequently took part in seasons 4 and 5 (early 2010—early 2011) and further seasons 7-12 (2013—2017; 2025), with the exception of the series season 6 (2012).

Journalist Kaye O'Hara claims that Kelly was offered a contract to return to the show for season six, but she declined it. According to the show's producer, Kelly was taking a year off.

In 2013, Kelly quit Carlile and returned to the show's season 7, which returned to run only in Canada, working now for Polar Industries, company owned by Mark Kohaykewych who also appeared on the series.

Starting with season 9 (2015), she worked with Darrell Ward in a self-owned trucking company for 2 years (seasons 9-10) before his death in 2016. Kelly ran the company on her own during early 2017 (season 11) before the arrival of Darrel's younger son, Reno Ward, with whom she ran the company until the end of the season.

She also took part in the History Channel's Ice Road Truckers: Deadliest Roads in later 2010, along with Rick Yemm, Dave Redmon and Alex Debogorski, trucking in the Himalayas in India during the first season, being the only one to conquer the journey through the Himalaya's mountain range. In a later season (late 2011), she drove on the Andes' Death Road (Yungas Road) in Bolivia and southern Peru roads, along with part of the first season cast (Rick and Dave) and newcomers Hugh Rowland, G.W. Boles, Augustin "Tino" Rodriguez and Timothy "Tim" R. Zickuhr.

In 2023, Kelly also provided the intro voiceover for Alaskan Road Truckers, a PC game on Steam.

She has a YouTube channel under her name.

In 2025 Kelly's returning for the Ice Road Truckers rerun in season 12 along the veteran Todd Dewey and newcomers Bill Danh, Scott Yuil, Shaun Harris, Zach Harris, Riley Harris and Todd Friesen .

== Personal life ==
In 2008, Lisa married Traves Kelly, after dating him for four years. He is full Aleut Native Alaskan and an avid dirtbiker. Her hobbies include motocross, horse riding, skydiving, hang gliding, and snowboarding. She owns a miniature horse named Rocky and a cat named Tanzi.
