= Edith Iglauer =

American journalist

Edith Iglauer Daly (formerly Hamburger; March 10, 1917 – February 13, 2019) was an American writer who wrote several nonfiction books, including The New People: The Eskimo's Journey Into Our Time (1966); Denison's Ice Road (1974), a profile of the ice road engineer John Denison; and Seven Stones (1981), a profile of the architect Arthur Erickson. She was also a freelance writer for The New Yorker, Harper's, The Atlantic Monthly, and Geist magazines.

== Early life and career ==
Edith Iglauer was born in Cleveland, Ohio, on March 10, 1917, to a family of German Jewish descent. She transferred to the Hathaway Brown School for Girls and subsequently pursued a bachelor's degree in political science at Wellesley College, followed by further education at the Columbia University School of Journalism. Her interest in Eskimo culture led her to travel the northern climates extensively. Iglauer appeared as herself, along with John Denison, in the History Channel presentation, Ice Road Truckers.

== Personal life ==
Edith Iglauer Hamburger's second husband was Canadian fisherman John Daly, who she featured in the book Fishing With John (1988), which was shortlisted for a Governor General's literary award. Widowed by Daly's sudden death on the dance floor, Iglauer later married widower Frank White, another self-reliant Canadian in the same coastal community where she had settled permanently. White died on October 18, 2015, aged 101, in Garden Bay, BC. Iglauer turned 100 in March 2017, and died in Sechelt, British Columbia on February 13, 2019, aged 101.
