= Charles E. Loizeaux =

American politician

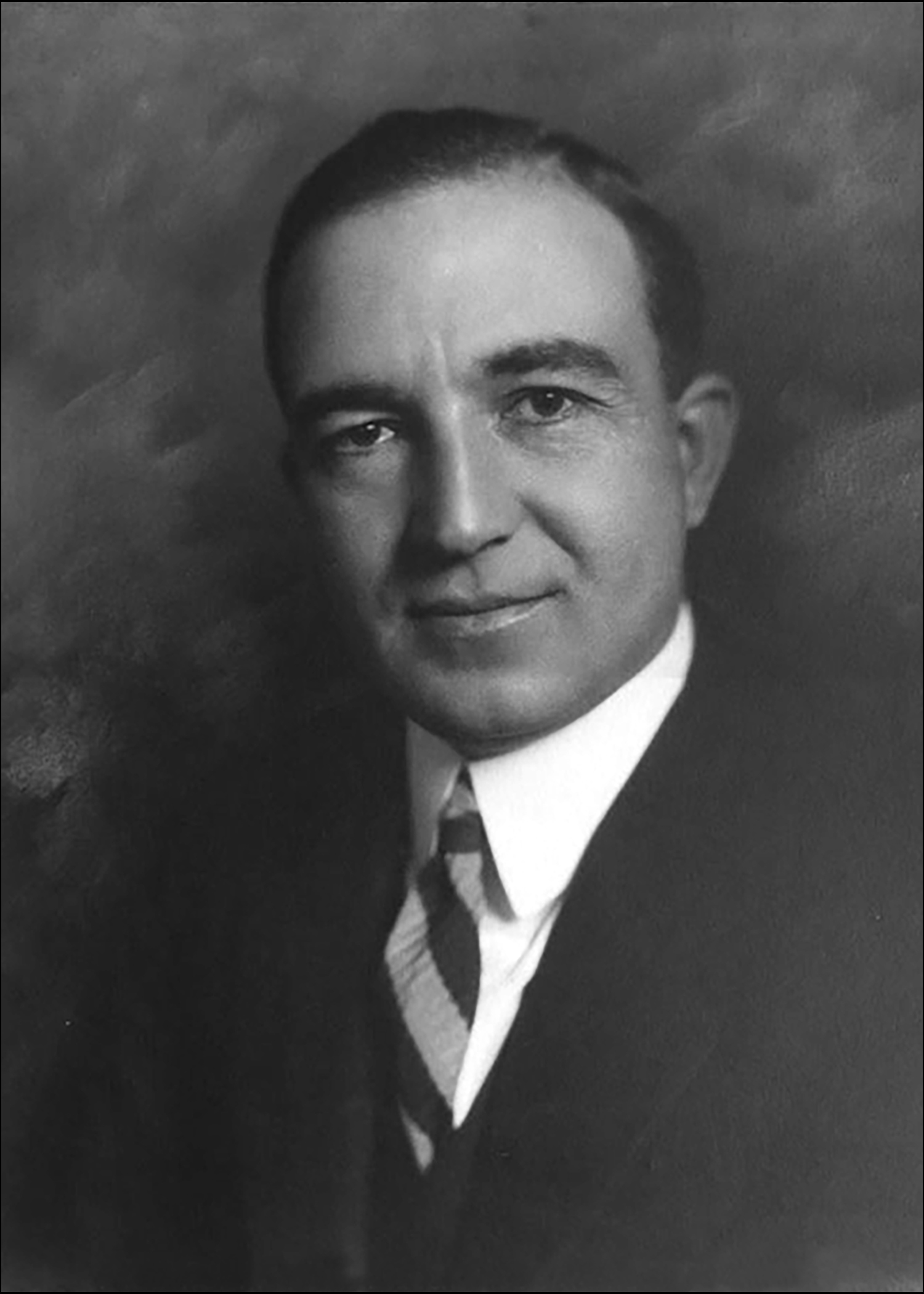

Member of the New Jersey Senate from the Union district
- In office 1933–1941
- Preceded by: Arthur N. Pierson
- Succeeded by: Herbert J. Pascoe

Mayor of Plainfield
- In office 1921–1924
- Preceded by: Leighton Calkins
- Succeeded by: James T. MacMurray

Personal details
- Born: January 22, 1889 Vinton, Iowa
- Died: March 7, 1947 (aged 58) Plainfield, New Jersey
- Party: Republican

Charles E. Loizeaux (January 22, 1889 – March 7, 1947) was an American politician who served in the New Jersey Senate from 1933 to 1941.
