= Mayor of Plainfield, New Jersey =

Political office in the United States

Plainfield, New Jersey was incorporated on April 21, 1869. Mayors are sworn in on January 1 of the new year, so there are no overlaps in years unless someone has died in office or resigned.

Years	Image	Mayor	Birth/death	Party	Notes
1869–1870		Job Male	(1808–1891)	Republican	Job Male was the first mayor of Plainfield, New Jersey. He took office on April 21, 1869.
1871–1872		John H. Evans		Anti-Bond party	
1873–1874		Dr. Charles Henry Stillman	(1817–1881)	Republican	
1875–1876		Dr. John C. Sutphen		Law & Order party or Citizen's Ticket	
1877–1878		Job Male	(1808–1891)	Republican	He also received the Democratic endorsement.
1879–1880		Nathan Harper		Democrat	
1881–1882		Lewis Van Syckel Fitz Randolph	(1838–1921)	Republican	
1883–1884		William B. Maxson		People's Union (United States)	
1885–1886		George W. Rockefellow		Citizens party	
1887–1890		Job Male		Republican	
1891–1896		Alexander Gilbert		Republican	
1897–1898		Charles J. Fisk		Republican	
1899–1900		George W. Rockefellow		Republican	
1901–1904		Dr. Olin L. Jenkins		Republican	
1905–1906		James F. Buckle		Republican	
1907–1910		Charles J. Fisk		Republican	
1911–1912		George W. V. Moy	(1866–?)	Democrat	
1913–1914		Percy Hamilton Stewart	(1867–1951)	Democrat	
1915–1920		Leighton Calkins	(1868–1955)	Republican	
1921–1924		Charles E. Loizeaux		Republican	
1925–1930		James T. MacMurray		Republican	
1931–1932		Martin B. Stutsman		Republican	
1933–1934		Charles Benson Wigton	(1885-?)	Republican	
1935–1936		Martin B. Stutsman		Republican	
1937–1938		DeWitt Dukes Barlow		Republican	
1939–1942		Harvey R. Linbarger		Republican	
1943–1946		Dixon C. Phillips		Republican	
1947–1948		John W. Zerega		Republican	
1949–1954		Carlyle W. Crane		Republican	
1955–1958		Allen D. Tompkins		Republican	
1959–1962		Richard P. Dyckman		Republican	
1963–1966		Robert C. Maddox		Republican	
1967–1968		George F. Hetfield		Republican	
1969–1973		Frank F. Blatz, Jr.		Republican	
1974–1981		Paul J. O'Keeffe		Republican	
1982–1984		Everett C. Lattimore		Democrat	First African-American mayor
1984–1989		Richard L. Taylor		Democrat	
1990–1993		Harold D. Mitchell		Democrat	
1994–1997		Mark A. Fury		Democrat	
1998–2005		Albert T. McWilliams		Democrat	
2006–2013		Sharon Robinson-Briggs		Democrat	Sharon Robinson-Briggs was the first female mayor of Plainfield, New Jersey.
2014–Present		Adrian Mapp		Democrat	
