= List of Ice Road Truckers episodes =

This is a list of TV episodes for the History Channel reality TV series Ice Road Truckers.

== Series overview ==
Season	Episodes	Originally released	
Season	Episodes	First released	Last released
1	10	June 17, 2007	August 19, 2007
2	13	June 8, 2008	September 7, 2008
3	13	May 31, 2009	August 23, 2009
4	16	June 6, 2010	October 3, 2010
5	16	June 5, 2011	September 25, 2011
6	16	June 3, 2012	September 23, 2012
7	12	June 9, 2013	August 25, 2013
8	12	July 7, 2014	September 28, 2014
9	10	August 2, 2015	October 18, 2015
10	10	August 4, 2016	October 6, 2016
11	10	August 24, 2017	November 9, 2017
12	8	October 1, 2025	November 19, 2025

== Episodes ==
=== Season 1 (2007) ===
No. overall	No. in season	Title	Original release date
1	1	"Ready to Roll"	June 17, 2007
2	2	"Diamond Mine"	June 24, 2007
3	3	"Dash for the Cash"	July 1, 2007
4	4	"The Big Chill"	July 8, 2007
5	5	"Midseason Mayhem"	July 15, 2007
6	6	"Driving on Thin Ice"	July 22, 2007
7	7	"The Rookie Challenge"	July 29, 2007
8	8	"Into the Whiteout"	August 5, 2007
9	9	"The Big Melt"	August 12, 2007
10	10	"The Final Run"	August 19, 2007

=== Season 2 (2008) ===
No. overall	No. in season	Title	Original release date
11	1	"Edge of the Earth"	June 8, 2008
12	2	"Mechanical Mayhem"	June 15, 2008
13	3	"The Big Blizzard"	June 22, 2008
14	4	"Arctic Whiteout"	June 29, 2008
15	5	"Lost on the Ice"	July 6, 2008
16	6	"Hundred Ton Haul"	July 13, 2008
17	7	"Man Down"	July 20, 2008
18	8	"A Trucker's Farewell"	July 27, 2008
19	9	"A Rookie Fumbles"	August 3, 2008
20	10	"Highway Maggots"	August 10, 2008
21	11	"Man vs. Ice"	August 17, 2008
22	12	"The Big Thaw"	August 24, 2008
23	13	"The World Crumbles"	September 7, 2008

=== Season 3 (2009) ===
No. overall	No. in season	Title	Original release date
24	1	"Deadliest Ice Road"	May 31, 2009
25	2	"Rookie Run"	June 9, 2009
26	3	"Canadian Invasion"	June 14, 2009
27	4	"Blinding Whiteout"	June 21, 2009
28	5	"Accident Alley"	June 28, 2009
29	6	"Arctic Ice"	July 5, 2009
30	7	"Wicked Weather"	July 12, 2009
31	8	"Killer Pass"	July 19, 2009
32	9	"Turn and Burn"	July 26, 2009
33	10	"Ocean Run"	August 2, 2009
34	11	"Busted Parts & Breakdowns"	August 9, 2009
35	12	"Race for the Finish"	August 29, 2009
36	13	"Arctic Thaw"	August 23, 2009

=== Season 4 (2010) ===
No. overall	No. in season	Title	Original release date
37	1	"Breaking Through"	June 6, 2010
38	2	"The Polar Bear Returns"	June 13, 2010
39	3	"Facing Down the Blow"	June 20, 2010
40	4	"Monster Storm Over Atigun"	June 27, 2010
41	5	"Trapped on Thin Ice"	July 11, 2010
42	6	"Danger at 55 Below"	July 18, 2010
43	7	"Avalanche!"	July 25, 2010
44	8	"Lisa's Monster Megahaul"	August 1, 2010
45	9	"Blood on the Dalton"	August 8, 2010
46	10	"The Ace vs. the Ice"	August 15, 2010
47	11	"A Rookie's Nightmare"	August 22, 2010
48	12	"The Dalton Strikes Back"	August 29, 2010
49	13	"Convoy to Hell"	September 12, 2010
50	14	"A Legend Meets His End"	September 19, 2010
51	15	"Deadly Melt"	September 26, 2010
52	16	"New King of the Dalton"	October 3, 2010

=== Season 5 (2011) ===
No. overall	No. in season	Title	Original release date
53–54	1–2	"Pushing the Edge"	June 5, 2011
53–54	1–2	"Ice Road Rage"	June 5, 2011
55	3	"Wrong Turn & Burned"	June 12, 2011
56	4	"Fire on Ice"	June 19, 2011
57	5	"Under the Hammer"	June 26, 2011
58	6	"The Braking Point"	July 10, 2011
59	7	"A Banged-Up Job"	July 17, 2011
60	8	"Meltdown!"	July 24, 2011
61	9	"Road to Nowhere"	July 31, 2011
62	10	"Rookie Rebellion"	August 7, 2011
63	11	"Hittin' the Skids"	August 14, 2011
64	12	"No More Mr. Nice Guy"	August 21, 2011
65	13	"Ice Rogue Trucker"	August 28, 2011
66	14	"The Heat Is On"	September 4, 2011
67	15	"Judgement Day"	September 18, 2011
68	16	"The Last Dash"	September 25, 2011

=== Season 6 (2012) ===
No. overall	No. in season	Title	Original release date
69	1	"Aces and Jokers"	June 3, 2012
70	2	"Sink or Swim"	June 10, 2012
71	3	"Hammer Down"	June 17, 2012
72	4	"No Way Out"	June 24, 2012
73	5	"Desperate Measures"	July 1, 2012
74	6	"Blood, Sweat, and Gears"	July 8, 2012
75	7	"Hard Road Ahead"	July 15, 2012
76	8	"Proving Ground"	July 22, 2012
77	9	"Braking Bad"	July 29, 2012
78	10	"Stacking the Deck"	August 5, 2012
79	11	"Hurricane Alley"	August 12, 2012
80	12	"Battle Lines"	August 19, 2012
81	13	"Cold-Blooded"	August 26, 2012
82	14	"Chopping Block"	September 9, 2012
83	15	"Race the Melt"	September 16, 2012
84	16	"The Final Showdown"	September 23, 2012

=== Season 7 (2013) ===
No. overall	No. in season	Title	Original release date
85	1	"Collision Course"	June 9, 2013
86	2	"Art Attack"	June 16, 2013
87	3	"Fear the Crack"	June 23, 2013
88	4	"Ice Rodeo"	June 30, 2013
89	5	"World War Hugh"	July 7, 2013
90	6	"Hail to the King!"	July 14, 2013
91	7	"Load Rules"	July 21, 2013
92	8	"Art of War"	July 28, 2013
93	9	"Haul of the Wild"	August 4, 2013
94	10	"Jagged Little Hill"	August 11, 2013
95	11	"The Wrecking Crew"	August 18, 2013
96	12	"Winter Takes All"	August 25, 2013

=== Season 8 (2014) ===
No. overall	No. in season	Title	Original release date
97	1	"The Gathering Storm"	July 7, 2014
98	2	"Rushin' Roulette"	July 14, 2014
99	3	"Into the Vortex"	July 21, 2014
100	4	"Snow Bound"	July 28, 2014
101	5	"The Storm Troopers"	August 3, 2014
102	6	"The Lone Wolf"	August 10, 2014
103	7	"Blazing the Trail"	August 17, 2014
104	8	"Highway to Hell"	August 24, 2014
105	9	"Flirtin' with Disaster"	September 7, 2014
106	10	"Icing on the Lake"	September 14, 2014
107	11	"Journey to the End of the Earth"	September 21, 2014
108	12	"World's End"	September 28, 2014

=== Season 9 (2015) ===
No. overall	No. in season	Title	Original release date
109	1	"Crossing Enemy Lines"	August 2, 2015
110	2	"Icy Grave"	August 9, 2015
111	3	"Trail Blazers"	August 16, 2015
112	4	"New Cold Blood"	August 23, 2015
113	5	"Power Trip"	August 30, 2015
114	6	"Break On Through"	September 13, 2015
115	7	"The Art of Survival"	September 20, 2015
116	8	"Mother Nature Scorned"	October 4, 2015
117	9	"Hell Freezes Over"	October 11, 2015
118	10	"Icy Alliance"	October 18, 2015

=== Season 10 (2016) ===
No. overall	No. in season	Title	Original release date
119	1	"Against All Odds"	August 4, 2016
120	2	"Feeling the Heat"	August 11, 2016
121	3	"Breakdown"	August 18, 2016
122	4	"Trial by Ice"	August 25, 2016
123	5	"The Rookie"	September 1, 2016
124	6	"Bridge to Nowhere"	September 8, 2016
125	7	"Into the Fire"	September 15, 2016
126	8	"Hell Niño"	September 22, 2016
127	9	"The Convoy"	September 29, 2016
128	10	"The Final Ride"	October 6, 2016

=== Season 11 (2017) ===
No. overall	No. in season	Title	Original release date
129	1	"The Ice Is Right "	August 24, 2017
130	2	"Jackknife Jeopardy "	August 31, 2017
131	3	"Helter Melter "	September 7, 2017
132	4	"Meltdown Blues "	September 14, 2017
133	5	"The Son Rises "	October 5, 2017
134	6	"A Bridge Too Far"	October 12, 2017
135	7	"Of Ice and Men"	October 19, 2017
136	8	"The Big Skid"	October 26, 2017
137	9	"Double Trouble"	November 2, 2017
138	10	"One Last Lick"	November 9, 2017

=== Season 12 (2025) ===
No. overall	No. in season	Title	Original release date
139	1	"The Northern Frontier"	October 1, 2025
140	2	"The Bet"	October 8, 2025
141	3	"Ice and Fire"	October 15, 2025
142	4	"Enemy Roads"	October 22, 2025
143	5	"Game On"	October 29, 2025
144	6	"Recovery Mission"	November 5, 2025
145	7	"Last Chance Convoy"	November 12, 2025
146	8	"End of the Road"	November 19, 2025

== Home and International Releases ==
Ice Road Truckers: The Complete Season 1
Set details			Additional Info
10 episodes; 3-disc DVD set; 1.33:1 non-anamorphic aspect ratio; Languages: English (Dolby Digital 2.0 Stereo)			7 Hours and 50 minutes; Ice Road Truckers episode of Dangerous Missions; 5 Featurettes: Meet the Truckers, Overcoming the Challenges, Perils of the Ice Road, Behind-The-Scenes, The Countdown
DVD release dates			7 Hours and 50 minutes; Ice Road Truckers episode of Dangerous Missions; 5 Featurettes: Meet the Truckers, Overcoming the Challenges, Perils of the Ice Road, Behind-The-Scenes, The Countdown
Region 1	Region 2	Region 4	7 Hours and 50 minutes; Ice Road Truckers episode of Dangerous Missions; 5 Featurettes: Meet the Truckers, Overcoming the Challenges, Perils of the Ice Road, Behind-The-Scenes, The Countdown
June 17, 2007	May 26, 2008	—N/a	7 Hours and 50 minutes; Ice Road Truckers episode of Dangerous Missions; 5 Featurettes: Meet the Truckers, Overcoming the Challenges, Perils of the Ice Road, Behind-The-Scenes, The Countdown

Ice Road Truckers: The Complete Season 2
Set details			Additional Details
13 episodes; 4-disc DVD set; 1.33:1 non-anamorphic aspect ratio; Languages: English (Dolby Digital 2.0 Stereo)			DISC 1: Edge of the Earth / Mechanical Mayhem / The Big Blizzard / Arctic Whiteout / BONUS(About the Ice Road); DISC 2: Lost on the Ice / Hundred Ton Haul / Man Down / A Trucker's Farewell / BONUS(Meet the Truckers); DISC 3: A Rookie Fumbles / Highway Maggots / Man vs. Ice / The Big Thaw / BONUS(Life in Northern Canada); DISC 4: Road to the Finale / The World Crumbles / BONUS(Road to Season 2, Off the Ice, Dangers on the Ice Road, Arctic Animals)
DVD release dates			DISC 1: Edge of the Earth / Mechanical Mayhem / The Big Blizzard / Arctic Whiteout / BONUS(About the Ice Road); DISC 2: Lost on the Ice / Hundred Ton Haul / Man Down / A Trucker's Farewell / BONUS(Meet the Truckers); DISC 3: A Rookie Fumbles / Highway Maggots / Man vs. Ice / The Big Thaw / BONUS(Life in Northern Canada); DISC 4: Road to the Finale / The World Crumbles / BONUS(Road to Season 2, Off the Ice, Dangers on the Ice Road, Arctic Animals)
Region 1	Region 2	Region 4	DISC 1: Edge of the Earth / Mechanical Mayhem / The Big Blizzard / Arctic Whiteout / BONUS(About the Ice Road); DISC 2: Lost on the Ice / Hundred Ton Haul / Man Down / A Trucker's Farewell / BONUS(Meet the Truckers); DISC 3: A Rookie Fumbles / Highway Maggots / Man vs. Ice / The Big Thaw / BONUS(Life in Northern Canada); DISC 4: Road to the Finale / The World Crumbles / BONUS(Road to Season 2, Off the Ice, Dangers on the Ice Road, Arctic Animals)
December 16, 2008	November 23, 2009	—N/a	DISC 1: Edge of the Earth / Mechanical Mayhem / The Big Blizzard / Arctic Whiteout / BONUS(About the Ice Road); DISC 2: Lost on the Ice / Hundred Ton Haul / Man Down / A Trucker's Farewell / BONUS(Meet the Truckers); DISC 3: A Rookie Fumbles / Highway Maggots / Man vs. Ice / The Big Thaw / BONUS(Life in Northern Canada); DISC 4: Road to the Finale / The World Crumbles / BONUS(Road to Season 2, Off the Ice, Dangers on the Ice Road, Arctic Animals)

Ice Road Truckers: The Complete Season 3
Set details			Additional Details
13 episodes; 4-disc DVD set; 1.33:1 non-anamorphic aspect ratio; Languages: English (Dolby Digital 2.0 Stereo)			DISC 1: Deadliest Ice Road / Rookie Run / Canadian Invasion / Blinding Whiteout; DISC 2: Accident Alley / Arctic Ice / Wicked Weather; DISC 3: Killer Pass / Turn and Burn / Ocean Run; DISC 4: Busted Parts & Breakdowns / Race for the Finish / Arctic Thaw / Bonus Footage
DVD release dates			DISC 1: Deadliest Ice Road / Rookie Run / Canadian Invasion / Blinding Whiteout; DISC 2: Accident Alley / Arctic Ice / Wicked Weather; DISC 3: Killer Pass / Turn and Burn / Ocean Run; DISC 4: Busted Parts & Breakdowns / Race for the Finish / Arctic Thaw / Bonus Footage
Region 1	Region 2	Region 4	DISC 1: Deadliest Ice Road / Rookie Run / Canadian Invasion / Blinding Whiteout; DISC 2: Accident Alley / Arctic Ice / Wicked Weather; DISC 3: Killer Pass / Turn and Burn / Ocean Run; DISC 4: Busted Parts & Breakdowns / Race for the Finish / Arctic Thaw / Bonus Footage
December 15, 2009	April 26, 2010	—N/a	DISC 1: Deadliest Ice Road / Rookie Run / Canadian Invasion / Blinding Whiteout; DISC 2: Accident Alley / Arctic Ice / Wicked Weather; DISC 3: Killer Pass / Turn and Burn / Ocean Run; DISC 4: Busted Parts & Breakdowns / Race for the Finish / Arctic Thaw / Bonus Footage

Ice Road Truckers: The Complete Season 4
Set details			Additional Details
16 episodes; 4-disc DVD set; 1.33:1 non-anamorphic aspect ratio; Languages: English (Dolby Digital 2.0 Stereo)			DISC 1: Breaking Through / The Polar Bear Returns / Facing Down The Blow / Monster Storm Over Atigun; DISC 2: Trapped on Thin Ice / Danger at 55 Below / Avalanche! / Lisa s Monster Megahaul; DISC 3: Blood on the Dalton / The Ace vs. The Ice / A Rookie s Nightmare / The Dalton Strikes Back; DISC 4: Convoy to Hell / A Legend Meets His End / Deadly Melt / New King of the Dalton / Bonus
DVD release dates			DISC 1: Breaking Through / The Polar Bear Returns / Facing Down The Blow / Monster Storm Over Atigun; DISC 2: Trapped on Thin Ice / Danger at 55 Below / Avalanche! / Lisa s Monster Megahaul; DISC 3: Blood on the Dalton / The Ace vs. The Ice / A Rookie s Nightmare / The Dalton Strikes Back; DISC 4: Convoy to Hell / A Legend Meets His End / Deadly Melt / New King of the Dalton / Bonus
Region 1	Region 2	Region 4	DISC 1: Breaking Through / The Polar Bear Returns / Facing Down The Blow / Monster Storm Over Atigun; DISC 2: Trapped on Thin Ice / Danger at 55 Below / Avalanche! / Lisa s Monster Megahaul; DISC 3: Blood on the Dalton / The Ace vs. The Ice / A Rookie s Nightmare / The Dalton Strikes Back; DISC 4: Convoy to Hell / A Legend Meets His End / Deadly Melt / New King of the Dalton / Bonus
February 22, 2011	May 23, 2011	—N/a	DISC 1: Breaking Through / The Polar Bear Returns / Facing Down The Blow / Monster Storm Over Atigun; DISC 2: Trapped on Thin Ice / Danger at 55 Below / Avalanche! / Lisa s Monster Megahaul; DISC 3: Blood on the Dalton / The Ace vs. The Ice / A Rookie s Nightmare / The Dalton Strikes Back; DISC 4: Convoy to Hell / A Legend Meets His End / Deadly Melt / New King of the Dalton / Bonus

Ice Road Truckers: The Complete Season 5
Set details			Additional Details
16 episodes; 4-disc DVD set; 1.33:1 non-anamorphic aspect ratio; Languages: English (Dolby Digital 2.0 Stereo)			DISC 1: Pushing the Edge/Ice Road Rage / Wrong Turn & Burned / Fire on Ice; DISC 2: Under the Hammer / The Braking Point / A Banged-Up Job / Meltdown!; DISC 3: Road to Nowhere / Rookie Rebellion / Hittin The Skids / No More Mr. Nice Guy; DISC 4: Ice Rogue Trucker / The Heat Is On / Judgement Day / The Last Dash / Bonus
DVD release dates			DISC 1: Pushing the Edge/Ice Road Rage / Wrong Turn & Burned / Fire on Ice; DISC 2: Under the Hammer / The Braking Point / A Banged-Up Job / Meltdown!; DISC 3: Road to Nowhere / Rookie Rebellion / Hittin The Skids / No More Mr. Nice Guy; DISC 4: Ice Rogue Trucker / The Heat Is On / Judgement Day / The Last Dash / Bonus
Region 1	Region 2	Region 4	DISC 1: Pushing the Edge/Ice Road Rage / Wrong Turn & Burned / Fire on Ice; DISC 2: Under the Hammer / The Braking Point / A Banged-Up Job / Meltdown!; DISC 3: Road to Nowhere / Rookie Rebellion / Hittin The Skids / No More Mr. Nice Guy; DISC 4: Ice Rogue Trucker / The Heat Is On / Judgement Day / The Last Dash / Bonus
April 17, 2012	May 7, 2012	—N/a	DISC 1: Pushing the Edge/Ice Road Rage / Wrong Turn & Burned / Fire on Ice; DISC 2: Under the Hammer / The Braking Point / A Banged-Up Job / Meltdown!; DISC 3: Road to Nowhere / Rookie Rebellion / Hittin The Skids / No More Mr. Nice Guy; DISC 4: Ice Rogue Trucker / The Heat Is On / Judgement Day / The Last Dash / Bonus

== See also ==
- Ice Road Truckers
- Ice Pilots NWT
