= Young Brothers Hawaii =

Shipping company

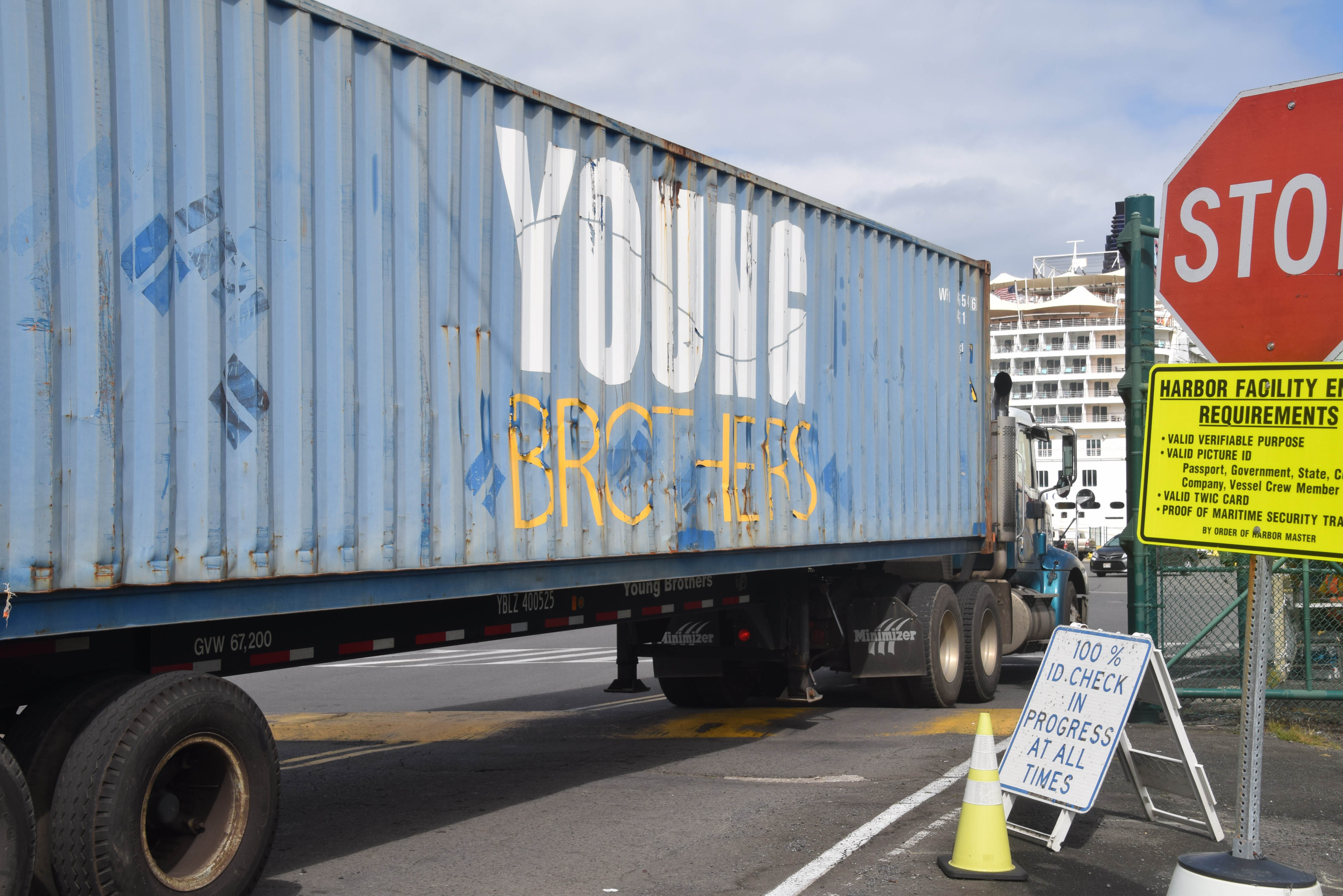
Young Brothers truck

Young Brothers, Ltd. is a shipment company, mainly doing inter island shipments business in Hawaii, U.S. It was established in 1913 in Honolulu, and is now a subsidiary of Foss Maritime, under Saltchuk Resources of Seattle, Washington.

== Timeline ==
In 1900, brothers Herb and William Young left San Francisco and arrived in Honolulu, Hawaii. Within a year, they started business in Honolulu Harbor. Soon after, a third brother, Jack, joined them.

In 1913, the three brothers established Young Brothers, Ltd., with its main business of ocean towing, rescue service and barge transportation between the islands. About that time they were awarded with the contract of shipping pineapples from Molokai to Honolulu for canning.

In 1961, Young Brothers separated harbor support service from shipping service by establishing a subsidiary, Hawaiian Tug & Barge.

In 1999, Young Brothers was sold to Saltchuk Resources of Seattle, Washington, and, since 2013, has been part of Saltchuk' Foss Maritime subsidiary.

Hawaii's interisland shipment service had been by Young Brothers only until 2018, when Pasha Hawaii Transport Lines LLC was approved as an additional shipper.

== See also ==
- Matson, Inc.
- Pasha Hawaii
