= Lewis Van Syckle Fitz Randolph =

American politician

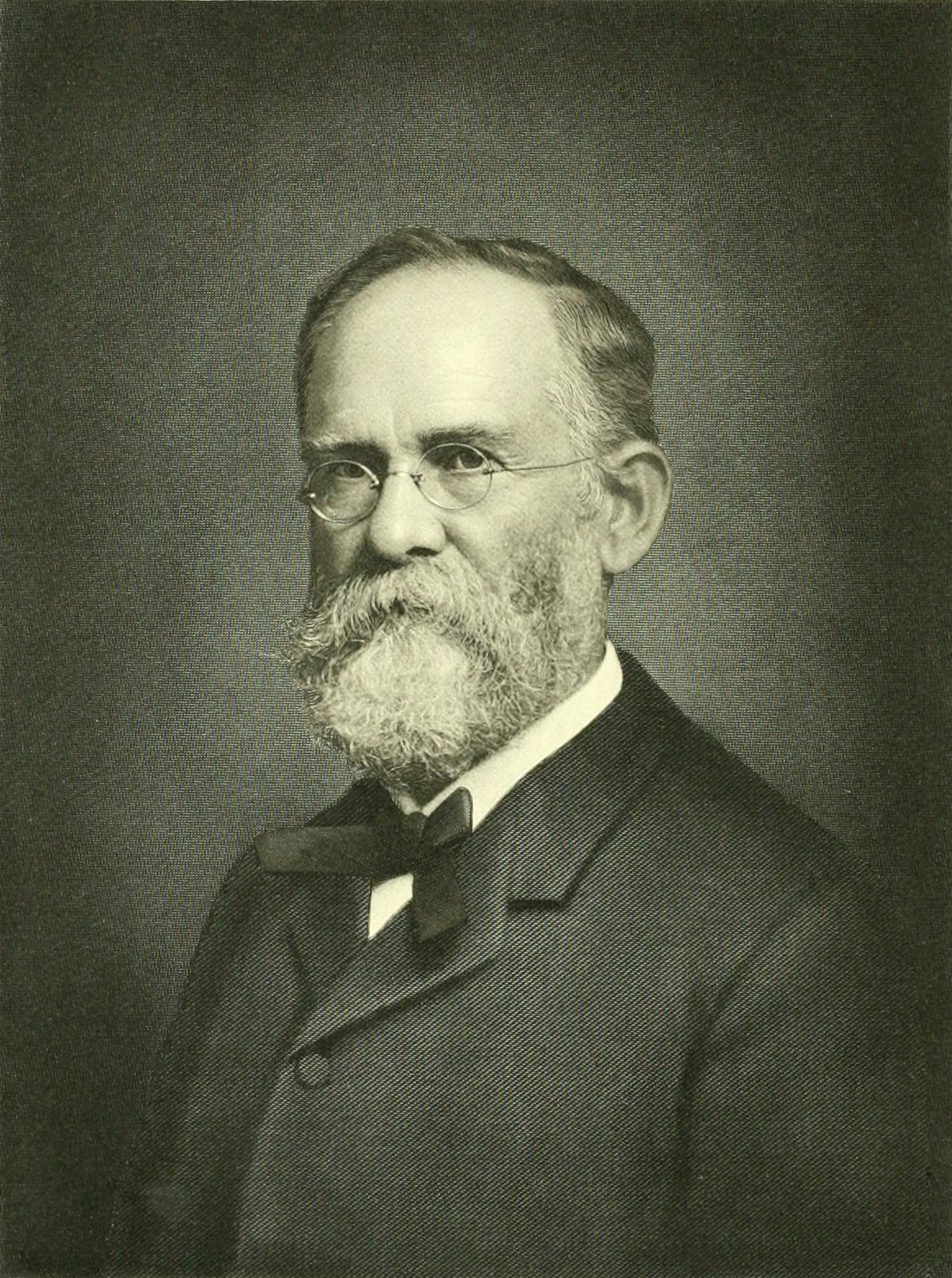
Lewis V. F. Randolph

Lewis Van Syckle Fitz Randolph (May 16, 1838 – January 2, 1921) was an American businessman and Mayor of Plainfield, New Jersey from 1881 to 1882.

== Biography ==
Lewis Van Syckle Fitz Randolph was born on May 16, 1838, in Somerville, New Jersey to Enoch Manning Fitz Randolph and Mary A. Van Syckle.

He served in the Union Army during the United States Civil War. He became a director of the Illinois Central Railroad in 1875. He resigned in 1885 and moved to Texas to work in the cattle business. In 1886, he joined the Tilden Trust.

He was the Mayor of Plainfield, New Jersey from 1881 to 1882. From 1895 to 1903 he was president of the Atlantic Trust Company.

In 1903 he became president of the Consolidated Stock Exchange.

He died on January 2, 1921, in Plainfield, New Jersey.

His widow, Emily Caroline Price (1840–1937) died in 1937.
