= Job Male =

American mayor (1808–1891)

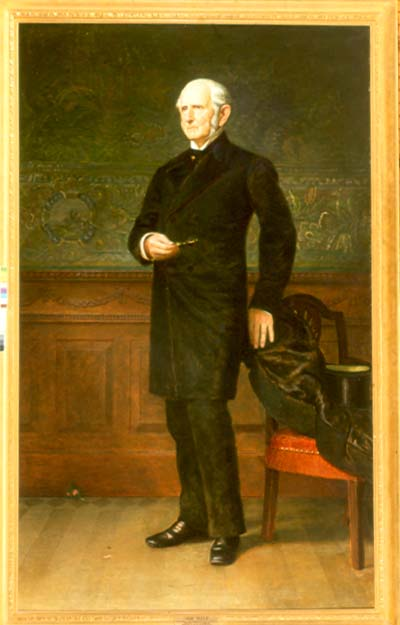

Mayor of Plainfield, New Jersey
- In office 1869 – 1870
- Succeeded by: John H. Evans

Mayor of Plainfield, New Jersey
- In office 1877 – 1878
- Preceded by: Dr. John C. Sutphen
- Succeeded by: Nathan Harper

Mayor of Plainfield, New Jersey
- In office 1887 – 1890
- Preceded by: George W. Rockefellow
- Succeeded by: Alexander Gilbert

Personal details
- Born: August 24, 1808 Somersetshire, England
- Died: January 29, 1891 (aged 82) Plainfield, New Jersey
- Party: Republican
- Spouse: Maria Glaze
- Occupation: Union Ferry Company, 1838-1845; New Jersey Railroad and Transportation Company, 1853-1859
- Profession: President of Hudson County National Bank, 1873-1878

Job Male (August 24, 1808 – 1891) was the first Mayor of Plainfield, New Jersey, serving from 1869 to 1870 and 1877–1878 and finally 1887–1890.

== Biography ==
Male was born on August 24, 1808, in Somersetshire, England. He emigrated to the United States in 1816 at age 8, with his parents. He worked at a toll booth on the road between Jersey City and Newark, New Jersey, later becoming a carpenter and then a superintendent of construction. He was appointed to the board of the Hudson County National Bank, in 1873 becoming president, which post he held until 1878. He built the original Plainfield library, and donated the building and land, and later joined the board. In 1875, he donated land for the building of Muhlenberg Hospital.

He died in 1891, and left an unsigned will.

== Legacy ==
Male donated land for the Plainfield Public Library and built the library building in 1886. It was then named the Job Male Public Library, Art Gallery and Museum. His home on Crescent Avenue and many of the houses he designed and built are in the Crescent Area Historic District, which was added to the National Register of Historic Places in 1980.
