= Tom Cotcher =

Scottish actor (born 1950)

- Born: 28 July 1950 (age 75); Scotland
- Occupation: Actor

Tom Cotcher (born 28 July 1950) is a Scottish actor.

== Early life and career ==
Tom Cotcher was born on 28 July 1950 in Scotland. He played DC Alan Woods in the long-running ITV police drama The Bill from 1992 to 1996. He also appeared briefly in an earlier episode of the police drama (as did several of the cast) as a local resident with a missing dog. Since then he has appeared in Taggart and Night and Day, and in October 2007 as a doctor in EastEnders. He has also made recurring appearances as Chief Superintendent Hobbs in the BBC Scotland soap opera River City. and as Mr. Mann in Ted Lasso. He appeared as Daniel Brown in the 2017 Holby City episode "Sleep Well" and is the narrator of the UK editions of Ice Road Truckers.

Cotcher voiced the character of Rick, the spotter in the racing video games TOCA Race Driver 2 and 3, in 2004 and 2006, respectively, as well as the characters of Benhart of Jugo and Cromwell the Pardoner in the action role-playing video game Dark Souls II in 2014.

He is a husband and father and lives in Brighton, England. In 2018, he recorded a two-part edition of The Bill Podcast to discuss his life and career.
