= Muhlenberg Regional Medical Center =

Coordinates: 40.607°N 74.403°W

- Solaris Health System

Geography
- Location: Plainfield, New Jersey, United States

Organization
- Funding: Non-profit hospital
- Type: Teaching
- Affiliated university: Robert Wood Johnson Medical School

Services
- Emergency department: Yes, limited
- Beds: 355

History
- Opened: 1877
- Closed: August 13, 2008

Links
- Lists: Hospitals in New Jersey

Muhlenberg Regional Medical Center was a community-based acute care hospital in Plainfield, New Jersey.

== History ==
It was founded in 1877 by the residents of Plainfield after a railroad accident. Job Male, the first mayor of Plainfield, donated the land.

The hospital was first located on Muhlenberg Place, now West Third Street.

The hospital is named after Reverend William Augustus Muhlenberg, who was a rector at the Protestant Episcopal Church of the Holy Communion in New York. William Muhlenberg was also the founder of St. Luke's Hospital in New York City.

Muhlenberg School of Nursing was founded in 1894 with two students. In 1971 the School of Nursing established an affiliation with Union County College in Cranford.

In 1994 the hospital celebrated its 100th anniversary.

In 1997 Solaris Health System was formed by joining Muhlenberg Regional Medical Center and JFK Medical Center in Edison. In November, 2007, Solaris Health System announced that it was intending to sell Muhlenberg.

Muhlenberg Regional Medical Center closed its 355-bed facility on August 13, 2008. JFK Medical Center continues to operate a satellite emergency department as well as other outpatient care from the facility.

Verifications for Muhlenberg Regional Medical Center have become available through the Federation Credentials Verification Service (FCVS) Closed Residency program records.

== Deaths ==
- Marie Luhring (1892-1939), automotive engineer, after a six month illness.
- Edward K. Gill (1917–1985), politician, heart ailment
