= Saltchuk =

United States logistics company

- Type: Private
- Industry: Navigational Services to Shipping; Towing and Tugboat Services
- Founded: 1982
- Headquarters: Seattle, Washington, U.S.
- Area served: North America
- Revenue: US$4.85 billion (2023)
- Website: www.saltchuk.com

Saltchuk is a family of transportation and distribution companies headquartered in Seattle, Washington, United States. As of September 2026, Puget Sound Business Journal listed it as the largest family owned company in Washington state, with 2025 revenues of $5.5 billion, employment of 1,150 in Washington and an additional 7,650 employees elsewhere in the world.

Throughout North America, Saltchuk companies provide air cargo, marine services, energy distribution, energy shipping, domestic shipping, international shipping, and logistics.

== History ==
The company was co-founded by eight investors, including Mike Garvey, in 1982. Of the eight original investors, four of their families remain partners today. Nicole Engle, Michele Seaver, and Denise Tabbutt took majority ownership roles in 2009.

== Lines of business ==
Saltchuk is organized in seven lines of business that are responsible for the operation and growth of a related portfolio of businesses:

- Saltchuk Marine: Consists of four operating companies.
  - Foss Maritime - A Tug company founded in 1889 and joined Saltchuk Marine in 1987.
- Great Lakes Dredge and Dock
- 450 Direct
  - Young Brothers - founded in 1900
- NorthStar Energy
- TOTE Group
- Tropical Shipping
- Overseas Shipholding Group (OSG)

== Regions served ==
Saltchuk stated goal is "building the best family of transportation and distribution companies in North America." Saltchuk companies specialize in serving non-contiguous regions of the country by having operational density in key US Markets, in particular Alaska, Washington, Hawaii and Florida/Caribbean markets.

=== Alaska ===
Across Alaska, Saltchuk companies provide fuel and cargo transportation. Saltchuk collectively is one of the state's largest private employers with more than 1,000 employees.

- Carlile Transportation
- Cook Inlet Tug & Barge
- Delta Western
- Foss Maritime Alaska
- Inlet Energy (merged with Delta Western Oct. 1, 2026)
- Northern Air Cargo
- Northern Air Maintenance Services (NAMS)
- TOTE Maritime
- Alaska Petroleum Distributing (merged with Delta Western Oct. 1, 2026)
- Naniq Global Logistics (Merged with Carlile Transportation 2026)
- Ryan Air Services

=== Florida and the Caribbean ===
Saltchuk's operations in Florida and the Caribbean include service to 28 ports, including service from Jacksonville to Puerto Rico and scheduled and on-demand air cargo service throughout the Caribbean. Saltchuk companies employ more than 1,900 in the region.

- TOTE Maritime Puerto Rico (formerly Sea Star Lines)
- Tropical Shipping
- Puerto Rico Terminals
- First Coast Terminals
- Overseas Shipholding Group
- Aqua Gulf Supply Chain Solutions (Shoreside Logistics merged in 2026)

== Acquisitions ==
=== Saltchuk Resources ===
In May 2024, Saltchuk Resources purchased Overseas Shipholding Group (OSG), a US-based deepwater and coastal tanker operator, for a reported $950 million.

CITB, an Alaska-based marine transportation company, was acquired in 2011.

Young Brothers was acquired in 1999 for an undisclosed amount.

Great Lakes Dredge and Dock was acquired in 2026.

=== Hawaii ===
Saltchuk acquired Young Brothers in 1999 and The Haynes Companies (Hawaii Petroleum companies) in 2006, expanding into energy distribution on Maui and the Big Island. In 2008, Saltchuk took over Aloha Airlines's cargo division after the airline went into bankruptcy.

- Aloha Air Cargo
- Hawaii Petroleum
- Ohana Fuels
- Maui Petroleum
- Minit Stop stores
- Young Brothers, Limited
