= John Carlisle =

John Carlisle may refer to:

- John Griffin Carlisle (1834–1910), United States Representative from Kentucky
- John Carlisle (Australian politician) (1863–1929), member of the Victorian Parliament
- John Nelson Carlisle (1866–1931), secretary of the New York Democratic Party
- John Carlisle (actor) (1935–2011), British actor
- John Carlisle (British politician) (1942–2019), British Conservative Party Member of Parliament and member of the Conservative Monday Club

== See also ==
- John Carlile (disambiguation)
- John Carlyle (disambiguation)
