= Carlile (given name) =

Carlile is a given name. It may refer to the following notable people:

- Carlile Aylmer Macartney (1895–1978), British academic specialising in the history and politics
- Carlile Henry Hayes Macartney (1842–1924), British painter and Orientalist
- Carlile Pollock Patterson (1816–1881), superintendent of the United States Coast Survey
  - USC&GS Carlile P. Patterson

== See also ==
- Carlile (surname)
- Carlisle (given name)
- Carlyle (name)
