= John Denison (engineer) =

Canadian ice road engineer (1916–2001)

John Burton Denison CM (June 30, 1916 – January 6, 2001) was a Canadian ice road engineer who operated in the Northwest Territories in the 1950s to 1970s.

== Biography ==
Denison was born in British Columbia in 1916. His father Norman Lippincott Denison was descended from the affluent Denison family of Toronto. After training in mechanics, Denison joined the Canadian Army during World War II. After the war, Denison joined the Royal Canadian Mounted Police, and was then attached from 1946 to the RCMP as a constable in Yellowknife.

A year later, he was involved in a search for a missing fur trapper on the Barren Lands First Nation, and after freezing his fingers, feet, and face, decided the RCMP was not the career for him. A year later, he resigned from the RCMP, and his fiancée Hannah and he left Yellowknife for Edmonton, where they married.

In search of work, Denison returned to the north in 1947 and worked on the cat trains supplying the mining camps with equipment. He eventually became associated with Byers Transport Limited, with whom he engineered a network of winter ice roads throughout the Northwest Territories to service various mines (including Port Radium, Discovery Mine, and Tundra Mine).

While Denison was not the first to attempt truck freighting on winter roads into Yellowknife (that honour goes to Al Hamilton of Grimshaw Trucking in the mid-1950s), he perfected the art of constructing ice roads and built them into some of the most isolated parts of the subarctic. His major interest was hauling around large buildings on ice roads between mining camps. Denison's exploits were the topic of Edith Iglauer's nonfiction book, Denison's Ice Road (1974).

On May 6, 1998, John Denison was awarded the Order of Canada for his work on the ice roads in the 1950s-1970s.

== Death ==
Denison died at his home in Kelowna on January 6, 2001, aged 84, survived by his widow Hannah and four children.
