= Carlisle, Michigan =

Carlisle, Michigan may refer to two unincorporated, mostly historic settlements in the U.S. state of Michigan:

- in Kalamo Township, Eaton County, Michigan
- in Byron Township, Kent County, Michigan, also known as West Carlisle
