= Carlisle, Antigua and Barbuda =

Coordinates: 17°8′14.76″N 61°48′2.48″W

Carlisle
- Village
- Location within Antigua and Barbuda
- Country: Antigua and Barbuda
- Island: Antigua
- Civil parish: Saint George

Government
  - Type: Village Council (possibly dissolved)

Population (2011)
  - Total: 545
- Time zone: UTC-4 (AST)

Carlisle is a village in Saint George Parish, Antigua and Barbuda.

== Demographics ==
Carlisle has one enumeration district, ED 41700.

=== Census data (2011) ===
Q48 Ethnic	Counts	%
African descendent	493	90.49%
Caucasian/White	10	1.75%
East Indian/India	10	1.75%
Mixed (Black/White)	14	2.52%
Mixed (Other)	14	2.52%
Other	2	0.39%
Don't know/Not stated	3	0.58%
Total	545	100.00%

Q49 Religion	Counts	%
Adventist	62	11.48%
Anglican	173	31.71%
Baptist	6	1.17%
Church of God	14	2.53%
Evangelical	3	0.58%
Jehovah Witness	6	1.17%
Methodist	12	2.14%
Moravian	38	7.00%
None/no religion	51	9.34%
Pentecostal	79	14.59%
Rastafarian	2	0.39%
Roman Catholic	47	8.56%
Weslyan Holiness	26	4.86%
Other	15	2.72%
Don't know/Not stated	10	1.75%
Total	544	100.00%
NotApp :	1	

Q58. Country of birth	Counts	%
Africa	3	0.58%
Other Latin or North American countries	1	0.19%
Antigua and Barbuda	397	72.82%
Other Caribbean countries	8	1.55%
Canada	6	1.17%
Other Asian countries	7	1.36%
Other European countries	1	0.19%
Dominica	13	2.33%
Guyana	24	4.47%
Jamaica	15	2.72%
Monsterrat	4	0.78%
St. Kitts and Nevis	4	0.78%
St. Lucia	3	0.58%
St. Vincent and the Grenadines	6	1.17%
Trinidad and Tobago	5	0.97%
United Kingdom	7	1.36%
USA	25	4.66%
USVI United States Virgin Islands	2	0.39%
Not Stated	11	1.94%
Total	545	100.00%

Q55 Internet Use	Counts	%
Yes	309	56.70%
No	231	42.33%
Don't know/Not stated	5	0.97%
Total	545	100.00%

Q71 Country of Citizenship 1	Counts	%
Antigua and Barbuda	438	80.39%
Other Caribbean countries	13	2.33%
Canada	3	0.58%
Other Asian and Middle Eastern countries	7	1.36%
Dominica	10	1.75%
Guyana	18	3.30%
Jamaica	13	2.33%
Monsterrat	1	0.19%
St. Lucia	3	0.58%
St. Vincent and the Grenadines	6	1.17%
Trinidad and Tobago	3	0.58%
United Kingdom	2	0.39%
USA	16	2.91%
Other countries	3	0.58%
Not Stated	8	1.55%
Total	545	100.00%

Q71 Country of Citizenship 2	Counts	%
Other Caribbean countries	6	9.23%
Canada	7	10.77%
Other Asian and Middle Eastern countries	2	3.08%
Dominica	4	6.15%
Guyana	7	10.77%
Jamaica	2	3.08%
Monsterrat	3	4.62%
St. Vincent and the Grenadines	1	1.54%
Trinidad and Tobago	1	1.54%
United Kingdom	12	16.92%
USA	18	26.15%
Other countries	4	6.15%
Total	69	100.00%
NotApp :	476	

Employment status	Counts	%
Employed	267	61.76%
Unemployed	20	4.66%
Inactive	141	32.60%
Not stated	4	0.98%
Total	432	100.00%
NotApp :	113	
