= Carlisle Public Schools =

School district in Massachusetts, United States

Carlisle Public Schools is a school district in Carlisle, Massachusetts, United States. The superintendent and middle school principal is Brad Croizer As of 2018, the district employed 79 faculty members and served 790 students in grades pre-K–8.

The district manages an elementary school and middle school collectively known as Carlisle Public School. The principal of the elementary school is Dennet Sidell. The middle school principal, Matt Mehler retired in 2025, and Brad Crozier is temporarily taking his spot as the school finds a new principal. Croizer became the principal of the school in 2026. Before Croizer was Jim O'Shea, who recently retired. he school was established in 1848 as a one-room school house.

== See also ==
- Concord-Carlisle High School
