= Carlisle Park =

Park in Richmond, London, England

Coordinates: 51°25′19″N 0°21′56″W

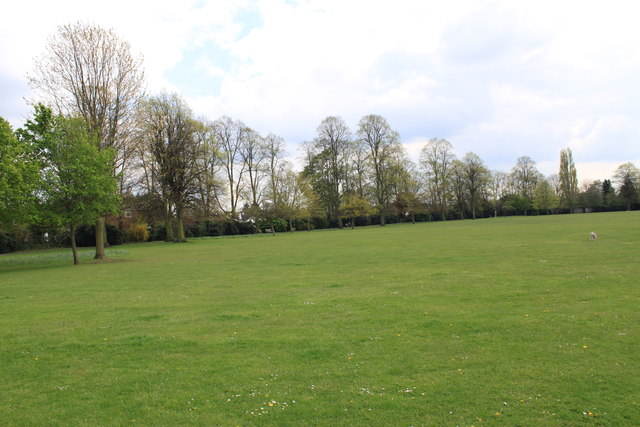
The park in 2012

Carlisle Park, at Wensleydale Road, Hampton TW12 2LY is a compact multi-use recreational area in West London, in the London Borough of Richmond upon Thames. It is about 600m north-east from Hampton railway station. Facilities include a bowling club, seven tennis courts, a children's playground, an adult aerobic exercise area, and sports pavilion. Two local cricket teams Hampton Hill CC and Woodlawn CC play there during the season. The park covers an area of 22 acres (0.1 km^{2}). Opening times vary by season: park gates are opened at 07:00am and closed at/after dusk e.g. at around 16:00pm in mid-winter, and in the summer it can stay open 'til as late as 21:00pm; notices re park closing-times are posted on all three park entrances. Car parking is available within the main (Wensleydale Road) entrance gates; pedestrians and cyclists can also gain access from single gateways in Carlisle Road and in Wensleydale Gardens.
