= John Nelson Carlisle =

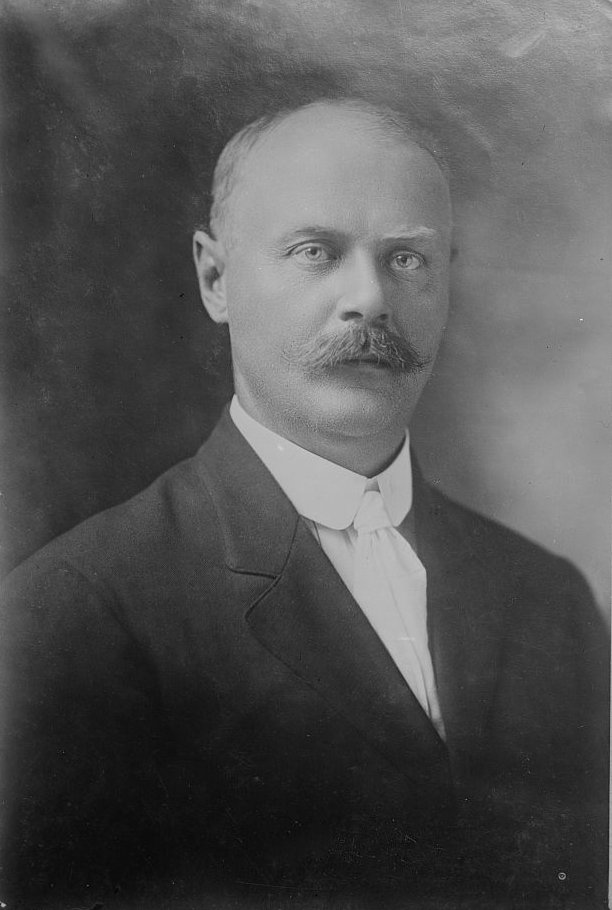

John Nelson Carlisle ( August 24, 1866 - July 21, 1931) was secretary of the New York Democratic Party from 1898 to 1905 and was a delegate to Democratic National Convention from New York in 1904.

== Biography ==
He was born in Preble, New York on August 24, 1866, to Catherine Rose Burdick and William S. Carlisle. He was the great-grandson of William Carlisle and the grandson of Nelson Burdick. He married, January 17, 1894, to Carrie C. Brown. Democrat. Lawyer; chair of Jefferson County Democratic Party, 1891–96; secretary of New York Democratic Party, 1898–1905; delegate to Democratic National Convention from New York, 1904. He died on July 21, 1931.
