= Allyson Carlyle =

American library science scholar and educator (1954–2020)

- Born: February 1954; Detroit, Michigan
- Died: April 4, 2020 (aged 66)

Allyson Carlyle (February 1954 – April 4, 2020) was a United States of America library and information science scholar, considered a leading scholar in the field of cataloging.

Carlyle was one of the initial faculty members of the University of Washington Information School, and served as the school’s first Associate Dean for Academics under Dean Michael Eisenberg. Carlyle worked to increase the diversity of the library profession, and established the Sherman Alexie and Lethene Parks Endowed Fellowship in Tribal and Rural Librarianship at the iSchool.

She was known for innovative cataloging research that focused on how users would find items, not just how librarians would organize them. In 1998 she was the recipient of the Jesse H. Shera Award for Excellence in Published Research for her article Fulfilling the Second Objective in the Online Catalog: Schemes for Organizing Author and Work Records into Usable Displays. She joined the editorial board of The Library Quarterly in 2009. She also won the OCLC/ALISE Research Paper Award in 2000, for Developing Organized Information Displays for Voluminous Works: A Study of User Clustering Behavior. She retired from the iSchool in 2018 but continued to teach cataloging there. An issue of Cataloging & Classification Quarterly was a dedicated festschrift to her.

Carlyle was born in Detroit, Michigan and raised in Montana. She earned her MLS and Ph.D. from the Graduate School of Library and Information Science at the University of California, Los Angeles, in 1994. Elaine Svenonius was her Ph.D. advisor. She served with the Peace Corps in Africa. Her longtime partner was Lisa Fusco, also a librarian and professor at UW.
