= Ice Road Truckers =

US-Canadian reality television series

- Genre: Reality
- Created by: Thom Beers
- Based on: Denison's Ice Road by Edith Iglauer
- Starring: Truckers
- Narrated by: Thom Beers; Tom Cotcher (UK); Bob Steele (season 12)
- Theme music composer: Steven Tyler, Joe Perry, Mark Hudson, Bruce Hanifan, Andy Kubiszewski, Gregg Montante with additional music by Amygdala Music Library
- Opening theme: "Livin' on the Edge" by Aerosmith (seasons 1 – 4 only) (US airings) "Ice Road Truckers Theme" by Bruce Hanifan, Gregg Montante (season 5 only) (US airings); (seasons 1 – 5 only) (international airings) "Maiden Voyage" by Andy Kubiszewski (seasons 7 – 11 only)
- Composers: Bruce Hanifan, Gregg Montante, Andy Kubiszewski, Grayson Matthews with additional music by Amygdala Music Library.
- Countries of origin: Canada; United States
- Original language: English
- No. of seasons: 12
- No. of episodes: 146 (list of episodes)

Production
- Producers: David McKillop; Dolores Gavin; Thom Beers; Philip Segal; Dawn Fitzgerald; Adam Martin; Aron Plucinski Dave Freed Jeff Meredith
- Running time: 45 – 48 minutes
- Production companies: Original Productions; Prospero Media (season 8); Shaw Media (season 8); Eagle Vision Productions (season 12); Corus Entertainment (season 12)

Original release
- Network: History
- Release: June 17, 2007 – November 9, 2017
- Release: October 1 – November 19, 2025

Related
- IRT Deadliest Roads; Ice Road Truckers: Breaking the Ice

Ice Road Truckers (commercially abbreviated IRT) is a reality television series that originally aired on History Channel from 2007 to 2017 until returning from hiatus in 2025. It features the activities of drivers who operate trucks on ice roads crossing frozen lakes and rivers, in remote territories in Canada and the U.S. state of Alaska. Seasons three to six also featured Alaska's improved but still remote Dalton Highway, which is mainly snow-covered solid ground.

== History ==
In 2000, History aired a 46-minute episode titled "Ice Road Truckers" as part of the Suicide Missions (later Dangerous Missions) series. Based on Edith Iglauer's book Denison's Ice Road, the episode details the treacherous job of driving trucks over frozen lakes, also known as ice roads, in Canada's Northwest Territories. After 2000, reruns of the documentary were aired as an episode of the series Modern Marvels, instead. Under this banner, the Ice Road Truckers show garnered very good ratings.

In 2006, the History Channel hired Thom Beers, owner of Original Productions and executive producer of Deadliest Catch, to create a series based on the Ice Road book. Shot in high-definition video (although the season ended before History HD was launched in the US), the show "charts two months in the lives of six extraordinary men who haul vital supplies to diamond mines and other remote locations over frozen lakes that double as roads".

The show ran for 11 seasons until 2017. In September of 2025, History Channel announced a new season, the first in seven years.

=== Airings ===
Season one of Ice Road Truckers was shown on the British national commercial channel Channel Five in February/March 2008. In Australia, it aired on Austar and Foxtel in early 2008, and from June 18 it also began being shown on Network Ten. In autumn 2008 season one aired on RTL 7 in the Netherlands. In Italy. the first season premiered on History Channel on January 7, 2010 as "Gli eroi del ghiaccio" ('Heroes of the ice').

The second season premiered on June 8, 2008, in the US; October 9, 2008 on History in the UK and in Australia; November 12, 2008, in New Zealand; and January 7, 2009, on Channel 5 in the UK. The first season was not aired in Canada until March 4, 2009, on History Television. The third season premiered on May 31, 2009, in the US; September 10 in the UK. Channel Five debuted series 3 on January 5, 2010.

== Reception ==
The series' premiere was seen by 3.4 million viewers, to become the most-watched original telecast in the History Channel's 12-year history at that time. Among critics, Adam Buckman of the New York Post said, "Everything about 'Ice Road Truckers' is astonishing". Virginia Heffernan of The New York Times said, "Watching these guys ... make their runs, it's hard not to share in their cold, fatigue and horrible highway hypnosis, that existential recognition behind the wheel late at night that the pull of sleep and the pull of death are one and the same. ... [I]t gets right exactly what Deadliest Catch got right, namely that the leave-nothing-but-your-footprints, green kind of eco-travelers are too mellow and conscientious to be interesting to watch. Instead, the burly, bearded, swearing men (and women) who blow methyl hydrate into their own transmissions and welcome storms as breaks from boredom ... are much better television." During 2007 the series was shown in the United Kingdom, Australia and various countries in Africa.

The show opening features a truck falling through the ice. While real accidents with fatal outcomes might be mentioned, the show has never featured them; the show opening is a miniature model filmed inside a studio. A season-one rumor that the sequence was staged using a real truck and dynamite caused discontent among the drivers.

== Episodes ==
Season	Episodes	Originally released	
Season	Episodes	First released	Last released
1	10	June 17, 2007	August 19, 2007
2	13	June 8, 2008	September 7, 2008
3	13	May 31, 2009	August 23, 2009
4	16	June 6, 2010	October 3, 2010
5	16	June 5, 2011	September 25, 2011
6	16	June 3, 2012	September 23, 2012
7	12	June 9, 2013	August 25, 2013
8	12	July 7, 2014	September 28, 2014
9	10	August 2, 2015	October 18, 2015
10	10	August 4, 2016	October 6, 2016
11	10	August 24, 2017	November 9, 2017
12	8	October 1, 2025	November 19, 2025

== Truckers ==
Trucker	Seasons											
Trucker	1	2	3	4	5	6	7	8	9	10	11	12
Alex Debogorski	Main											
Hugh Rowland	Main											
Rick Yemm	Main				Main							
Drew Sherwood	Main											
Jay Westgard	Main											
T.J. Tilcox	Main											
Eric Dufresne		Main										
Jerry Dusdal		Main										
Lisa Kelly			Main				Main					
Jack Jessee			Main			Main						
George Spears			Main									
Timothy "Tim" Freeman Jr.			Main									
Greg Boadwine				Main								
Ray Veilleux				Main		Recurring						
Dave Redmon					Main							
Tony Molesky			Recurring		Main	Recurring						
Maya Sieber					Main							
Darrell Ward						Main						
Austin Wheeler						Main						
Ronald "Pork Chop" Mangum						Main						
Mark Kohaykewych					Recurring		Main					
Art Burke							Main					
Todd Dewey							Main					
Joey Barnes							Main	Guest	Guest			
Mike Simmons									Main			
Steph Custance										Main		
Reno Ward						Guest		Guest			Main	
Bill Danh												Main
Shaun Harris												Main
Riley Harris												Main
Zach Harris												Main
Scott Yuil												Main
Bear Swensen		Recurring										
Cody Hyce			Recurring									
Jack McCahan			Recurring									
Carey Hall			Recurring									
Phil Kromm			Recurring									
Lane Keator			Recurring									
Vlad Pleskot					Recurring							
David Horbas					Recurring							
Todd Friesen												Recurring

== IRT: Deadliest Roads ==
Ice Road Truckers: Deadliest Roads
- Also known as: I.R.T.: Deadliest Roads
- Genre: Reality documentary
- Created by: Thom Beers
- Based on: Ice Road Truckers
- Starring: Truckers (Deadliest Roads)
- Narrated by: Thom Beers; Tom Cotcher (UK)
- Opening theme: "Livin' on the Edge" by Aerosmith (season 1 only) (US airings) "Black Mo" by Blues Saraceno (season 1 only) (international airings) "Ice Road Truckers Theme" by Bruce Hanifan, Gregg Montante (season 1 only) (digital / streaming) "Over the Line" by Andy Kubiszewski (season 2 only)
- Composers: Steven Tyler, Joe Perry, Mark Hudson, Bruce Hanifan, Gregg Montante, Andy Kubiszewski, Paul Hepker
- Countries of origin: Canada; United States
- Original language: English
- No. of seasons: 2
- No. of episodes: 23 (list of episodes)

Production
- Producers: David McKillop; Dolores Gavin; Thom Beers; Philip Segal; Dawn Fitzgerald; Adam Martin; Aron Plucinski
- Production locations: India and South America
- Running time: 45 – 48 minutes
- Production company: Original Productions

Original release
- Network: History
- Release: October 3, 2010 – December 18, 2011

=== Season 1: Himalayas ===
On October 3, 2010, a spinoff series, titled IRT: Deadliest Roads, premiered immediately after the season-four finale. Rick Yemm, Alex Debogorski, and Lisa Kelly traveled to India and put their driving skills to the test on the narrow, treacherous mountain roads that lead from Delhi to Shimla, then up to the Karchan and Kuppa hydroelectric dam construction sites in the Himalayas.

The truckers were accompanied by spotters, who were responsible for making the negotiations in case of problems with other drivers in the city and keeping them safe during their routes and difficult spots on the road.

In season 1, three spotters were present, each one for one respective trucker. Tashi was Lisa's spotter. Sanjeev was Alex's spotter during his first day and helped him during his problems and accidents in New Delhi. Later Dave's spotter with Alex's quit and his arrive. Hameed was Rick's spotter.

Debogorski quit in the first episode due to fear of angry mobs if he were involved in an accident and the pressure of city chaos, and was replaced by Alabama's trucker Dave Redmon (who has since been featured in season five of Ice Road Truckers). As the season continued, the drivers were dispatched to carry supplies over the stormy Rohtang Pass to the town of Keylong, which had been cut off for months due to the bad weather. The season finale aired on December 5, 2010, with the truckers attempting to deliver loads of jet fuel for helicopter crews who were working to rescue people stranded in the mountains by the storms. Yemm and Redmon turned back, deciding that the conditions were too hazardous for the volatile cargo; the next day, Kelly hauled the entire shipment herself and delivered it to the crews, becoming the only North American trucker to complete the entire season.

The roads were often hacked out of vertical cliffs like a tunnel with one side open to the air, with rock overhangs overhead and drops of several hundred feet below. One part of the road was called "the Freefall Freeway".

- In episode 5: "Crumbling Roads", Kelly and Yemm delivered two images (one each, well-packed with sandbags, sand, and straw) of the goddess Kali (shown as treading on her husband Shiva) along a risky mountain road hacked out of cliff sides to a temple at a town called Kalpa, Himachal Pradesh.
- In episode 6: "Thin Air", they struggled with a worse road and altitude hypoxia on the Rohtang Pass, and one of them delivered an image of Buddha and some Buddhist scriptures to a Tibetan-type Buddhist monastery in the mountains.

Early promotional spots for the series listed the title as IRT: Himalayas.

=== Season 2: South America ===
The second season of IRT: Deadliest Roads premiered on September 25, 2011. Six North American drivers are sent to Bolivia to haul cargo along the Yungas Road, notorious for its extreme hazards. The drivers work in pairs, as in the first season, but this time, instead of taking locals as spotters, the drivers also acted as them, where one driver would be the main driver for that run (drives the truck most part or the entire run) and the other would be the spotter, taking turns between them. – Hugh Rowland and Rick Yemm, Lisa Kelly and Dave Redmon, and newcomers Timothy "Tim" R. Zickuhr and Augustin "Tino" Rodriguez. Redmon and Yemm quit in episode 2; Rowland continues driving alone, while Texas trucker G.W. Boles arrives to ride with Kelly and replace Dave in episode 4. Making "Tim & Tino" the only original pair to stay together the entire season. Starting with episode 8, the truckers relocate to Peru and begin transporting loads to sites high in the Andes mountain range.

In episode 6, Kelly and Boles transport 32 breeding llamas across the Salar de Uyuni, the world's biggest salt flat, 12,000 ft (3,700 m) above sea level. On the way, their truck's radiator begins to leak; after they mend it, they must empty all their drinking water into the radiator to replace the loss. Abundant lithium deposits cause their magnetic compasses to read incorrectly, and for a time, their global positioning system malfunctions.

In February 2015, Tim Zickuhr pleaded guilty to kidnapping and extortion, then was sentenced to a maximum of 15 years prison. Zickuhr's current incarceration and/or parole status are uncertain.

Early promotional spots for the series listed the title as IRT: The Andes.

== Episodes ==
Season	Episodes	Season premiere	Season finale
1	10	October 3, 2010	December 5, 2010
2	13	September 25, 2011	December 18, 2011

== Truckers (Deadliest Roads) ==
Truckers	Seasons	
Truckers	1	2
Lisa Kelly	Main	
Hugh Rowland		Main
Timothy "Tim" R. Zickuhr		Main
Augustin "Tino" Rodriguez		Main
"G.W." Boles		Main
Dave Redmon	Main	Recurring
Rick Yemm	Main	Recurring
Alex Debogorski	Recurring	
Tashi Chombel (Lisa's Spotter)	Recurring	
Abdul Hameed (Rick's Spotter)	Recurring	
Sanjeev Kumar (Alex's/Dave's Spotter)	Recurring	

== Soundtrack ==
The Ice Road Truckers and Ice Road Truckers: Deadliest Roads soundtracks are composed and produced mainly by Bruce Hanifan. The series also includes music from other artists such as Gregg Montante, Andy Kubiszewski, Grayson Matthews, Paul Hepker, and many others. The additional music and sound effects are licensed by Amygdala Music Library owned by the American recording studios company Amygdala Records, which have a partnership with Original Productions (series production company).

The series' original theme song was Aerosmith's 1993 song "Livin' on the Edge", composed by Steven Tyler, Joe Perry, and Mark Hudson. The song was used in the openings of the series four initial seasons (2007 – early 2010) in the United States and Canada dubbing (original audio); in 2011, it was replaced by the song "Ice Road Truckers Theme", written specifically for the show's soundtrack by Bruce Hanifan and Gregg Montante. Hanifan's and Montante's song was used in the series worldwide premiere and distribution as the opening theme, replacing the Aerosmith song even for the initial seasons of the series outside the United States and Canada.

The song was also used as replacement in the digital / streaming versions of the first season of I.R.T.: Deadliest Roads (late 2010), which also used "Livin' on the Edge" as its original theme song in the United States and Canada. In the worldwide television premiere, the song "Black Mo" by Blues Saraceno was used as theme and background music in promotional videos of the spin-off's first season.

For season 2 of the spin-off series (late 2011), the song "Over the Line"—originally composed for the series soundtrack by Andy Kubiszewski—was used in the opening sequence, both in U.S. and worldwide airings.

Season 6 (2012) also uses a song composed by Kubiszewski as its theme, which was never released by Amygdala or Andrew.

In 2013, during the production of season 7, Original Productions contracted VARIPIX to rebuild the series' opening sequence. This led to the main theme changing once again, to the song "Maiden Voyage" by Andy Kubiszewski; "Maiden Voyage" remained as the theme song for the show's next five seasons (2013–2017).

== Other media ==
In 2008, 20th Century Fox acquired the rights from the History Channel to create a scripted, theatrical action film based on the series, with a script penned by William Wisher Jr., and John Moore attached as director.

In 2010, a video game for the PlayStation Portable was released by Slitherine Software.

In 2020, the show was mentioned in "Godzilla" by Eminem and Juice WRLD.

== See also ==
- Highway Thru Hell
- Ice Pilots NWT
