= Carlyle Jones =

Australian rules footballer, born 1904

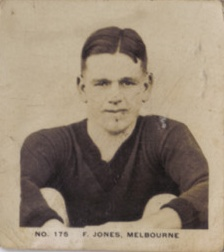

Personal information
- Full name: Carlyle Thornton Jones
- Born: 3 April 1904; Stawell, Victoria
- Died: 2 June 1951 (aged 47); Hamilton, Victoria
- Height: 165 cm (5 ft 5 in)
- Weight: 64 kg (141 lb)

Playing career^{1}
Years	Club	Games (Goals)
1925–26, 1929	Melbourne	11 (14)
1931	St Kilda	1 (1)
- ^{1} Playing statistics correct to the end of 1931.

Carlyle Thornton Jones (3 April 1904 – 2 June 1951, referred to as Tom Jones in some sources) was an Australian rules footballer who played with Melbourne and St Kilda in the Victorian Football League (VFL).

== Death ==
He died on 2 June 1951 in Hamilton, Victoria, and he was buried at Box Hill Cemetery.
