= New Carlisle =

New Carlisle may refer to:

== Communities ==
- New Carlisle, Indiana, United States
- New Carlisle, Ohio, United States
- New Carlisle, Quebec, Canada

== Transportation ==
- New Carlisle station (South Shore Line), a former railroad station in New Carlisle, Indiana, United States
- New Carlisle station (Quebec), a former railway station in New Carlisle, Quebec, Canada
