= John Carlyle =

John Carlyle may refer to:

- John Carlyle (merchant) (1720–1780), Scottish merchant in Virginia
- John Aitken Carlyle (1801–1879), Scottish doctor and brother of Thomas Carlyle
- Johnny Carlyle (1929–2017), British ice hockey player and coach
- John Carlyle, a character in the 2013 film Elysium

== See also ==
- John Carlile (disambiguation)
- John Carlisle (disambiguation)
