= Phyllis Cook Carlisle =

Canadian architect (1912–1954)

- Born: 1912; Toronto, Ontario, Canada
- Died: 1954 (aged 41–42); Toronto, Canada
- Known for: Architecture
- Spouse: Kenneth Carlisle (m. 1937)

Phyllis Cook Carlisle (1912 – 1954) née Phyllis Willson Cook was a Canadian architect.

== Biography ==
Cook was born in Toronto in 1912. She attended the University of Toronto and graduated with honors in 1935 earning a B.Arch. While at university she became the first woman to win the annual student design competition by the Royal Architectural Institute of Canada (RAIC). In 1934, that design for An Embassy in the Capital City of a Country in the Temperate Zon was published in the RAIC Journal.

Additional awards won during her school years included the Toronto Brick Company Award, Architectural Guild Bronze Medal, and the Darling and Pearson prize.

In 1935 Cook wrote an article for RAIC Journal called The Modern Kitchen.

From 1935 to 1937 Cook worked at Eaton’s Department Store in Toronto, where she was part of the Interior Decorating Department.

In 1937 Cook married Kenneth Carlisle. They had three children.

As her career continued, Cook (now Carlisle) designed kitchens that appeared in the Formica promotional materials.

Carlisle also designed several residences in Ontario.

Around 1945 Carlisle appeared in a series on the Canadian Broadcasting Corporation about home renovations.

She died in 1954 at the age of 42.
