= HMS Carlisle =

Three ships of the Royal Navy have borne the name HMS Carlisle, after Carlisle, Cumbria:

- HMS Carlisle (1693) was a 60-gun fourth rate launched in 1693 and wrecked in 1696.
- HMS Carlisle (1698) was a 48-gun fourth rate launched in 1698 and accidentally blown up in 1700.
- HMS Carlisle (D67) was a C-class cruiser launched in 1918 and scrapped in 1949.
