= John Carlile (footballer) =

Australian rules footballer

Personal information
- Full name: John Carlile
- Born: 8 January 1942 (age 84)
- Original team: Port Melbourne District
- Height: 183 cm (6 ft 0 in)
- Weight: 90 kg (198 lb)

Playing career^{1}
Years	Club	Games (Goals)
1961	South Melbourne	4 (0)
- ^{1} Playing statistics correct to the end of 1961.

John Carlile (born 8 January 1942) is a former Australian rules footballer who played with South Melbourne in the Victorian Football League (VFL).
