= Carlyle Harmon =

American businessman (1905–1997)

Frank Carlyle Harmon (January 17, 1905 – March 25, 1997) was an American former head of fabrics research for Johnson and Johnson. He is best known for his patent, held jointly with Billy Gene Harper of Dow Chemical, that made the possible the production of modern "superabsorbent" disposable diapers.

== Background ==
Harmon was born in Sugar City, Idaho, to Frank Milton Harmon and Sophia Jones. He spent most of his childhood in Santa Clara, California, and he was a lifelong Mormon. At age ten he took a job at a printing office for a man named Henry Roth. In October, 1923 he attended Stanford University, receiving a bachelor's degree in 1927, a master's degree in 1928, and a Ph.D. in 1930. He married the former Delta Arbon on March 22, 1929. After working for the Marathon Paper co. of Wausau, Wisconsin, for a time, Harmon was employed by the Chicopee division of Johnson and Johnson in 1947.

== "Superabsorbent" disposable diapers ==
The disposable diaper, in its original form invented by Victor Mills of Procter & Gamble, required a core of thick rolls of paper in order to adequately contain fluid and guard against diaper rash. This made the diapers undesirably heavy and bulky. In 1966, Harmon and Harper each independently discovered that a small amount of a highly absorbent polymer could be more effectively used in place of rolls of paper in the diaper's core. The two men each filed substantively identical patents on the polymer at the same time.

Because diapers are a low-margin product, it was deemed economically unfeasible to put Harmon and Harper's idea into mass production while the polymer was still under their patent protection. After the patent expired in the mid-1980s, however, manufacturers began to introduce "superabsorbent" disposable diapers, made with the polymers in place of excess paper in the diaper's core. The size and weight of disposable diapers then dropped substantially. This resulted in significant savings, both with regard to the cost of shipping large quantities of diapers from manufacturers to stores, and in the shelf space needed for the diapers in those stores. Additionally, newer studies on superabsorbent disposable diapers indicated that babies who wear those diapers experience diaper rash at a lower general rate than do those who wear cloth diapers.

== Later life ==
Harmon worked for Johnson and Johnson for 23 years. At the time of his 1970 retirement, he held 39 patents. He then went on to join the research department of Brigham Young University and later to found Eyring Research Institute.

Harmon was widowed in 1987, remarried in 1988 and died in 1997 after a lengthy illness.
