= Carlyle Kenley =

Australian rules footballer

Personal information
- Full name: John Carlyle Kenley
- Born: 26 February 1892; Caulfield, Victoria
- Died: 23 July 1965 (aged 73); Brighton, Victoria
- Original team: Elsternwick (VAFA)

Playing career^{1}
Years	Club	Games (Goals)
1913–14	Melbourne	7 (3)
1918–19	St Kilda	18 (5)
Total		25 (8)
- ^{1} Playing statistics correct to the end of 1919.

John Carlyle Kenley (26 February 1892 – 23 July 1965) was an Australian rules footballer who played with Melbourne and St Kilda in the Victorian Football League (VFL).
