= Carlyle Brown =

American playwright, performer and artistic director

Carlyle Brown is an American playwright, performer and the artistic director and founder of the Minneapolis-based Carlyle Brown & Company. His notable plays include The African Company Presents Richard the Third, Pure Confidence, The Beggar's Strike, The Negro of Peter the Great, A Big Blue Nail, The Pool Room, Dartmoor Prison, Yellow Moon Rising, Down in the Mississippi and others.

Brown is a core writer and board member of the Playwrights' Center in Minneapolis. He is an alumnus of New Dramatists in New York and the recipient of commissions from the Houston Grand Opera, The Children's Theatre Company, Arena Stage, Alabama Shakespeare Festival, Actors Theatre of Louisville, The Goodman Theatre and others.

== Awards and honors ==
He is the 2018 William Inge Theater Festival Honoree, a 2010 United States Artists Fellow, a 2010 recipient of the Otto Rene' Castillo Award for Political Theatre, a 2008 Guggenheim Fellow, and a recipient of the 2006 The Black Theatre Network's Winona Lee Fletcher Award for outstanding achievement and artistic excellence.

== Plays ==
=== Original plays ===
- Little Tommy Parker Celebrated Colored Minstrel Show (1992)
- The African Company Presents Richard III (1994)
- Buffalo Hair (1995)
- The Beggar's Strike (2004)
- The Pool Room (2004)
- The Fula From America
- Pure Confidence (2005)
- Are You Now or Have You Ever Been... (2012)
- The Amen Corner (2013)
- Abe Lincoln and Uncle Tom in the White House (2014)
- Down in Mississippi (2017) first edition 2008
