= Carlile Transportation =

Alaskan transportation company

Carlile Transportation Systems
- Type: Subsidiary (since 2013)
- Industry: Transportation
- Founded: 1980; 46 years ago in Anchorage, Alaska, U.S.
- Founders: Harry McDonald; John McDonald
- Headquarters: Anchorage, Alaska, U.S.
- Area served: United States, Canada
- Key people: Terry Howard (president)
- Number of employees: approx. 700
- Parent: Saltchuk
- Website: www.carlile.biz

Carlile Transportation Systems is an American transportation company based in Anchorage, Alaska. Their primary specialty is transporting freight and supplies related to the oil exploration industry, most notably to the Prudhoe Bay oil field.

== History ==
The company was founded in 1980 as Carlile Enterprises by brothers Harry and John McDonald with their two trucks. In 1985, they made their first haul to Prudhoe on the Dalton Highway.

Carlile developed an "approach" in transporting loads on the Dalton, which Harry McDonald described in a 2010 interview, that keeps his drivers safe, his trucks rolling, and gets the freight delivered on time and in one piece.

The company was purchased by Seattle, Washington-based Saltchuk on May 31, 2013.

Tom Hendrix Jr., Carlile's Vice President of Oil and Gas, tells in a 2017 interview how one of their most important clients and key partners influenced this approach: the Trans-Alaska Pipeline System.

== Operation ==
The company currently operates facilities in Anchorage, Deadhorse (Prudhoe), Fairbanks, Kenai, Kodiak, and Seward (all in Alaska), as well as in Edmonton, Alberta, and the port cities of Tacoma, Washington and Houston, Texas.

== In media ==
Carlile made their first appearance on The History Channel in a July 2006 documentary called Alaska: Dangerous Territory. When they returned to History in the television series Ice Road Truckers in 2009, they were hauling approximately 30% of all loads bound for Prudhoe Bay. Carlile would be one of the featured companies of the series from Season 3 (2009) through Season 6 (2012).
