= Carlyle W. Crane =

American politician (1914–1992)

Carlyle Wohlbrook Crane (July 21, 1914 - February 22, 1992) was a Republican Party politician who served as the Mayor of Plainfield, New Jersey and as a member of the New Jersey General Assembly.

== Biography ==
He was born on July 21, 1914. Crane graduated from Dartmouth College in 1935. He was the Mayor of Plainfield, New Jersey from 1949 to 1954. He was elected to State Assembly in 1953 and was re-elected in 1955. In 1956, State Senator Kenneth Hand resigned to become a Superior Court Judge. Crane became a candidate to fill Hand's unexpired term. He lost a hotly contested Republican Primary to Elizabeth Daily Journal publisher Robert C. Crane by 5,333 votes, with Assemblyman G. Clifford Thomas finishing 3,870 votes behind him. Crane did not seek re-election to a third term as an Assemblyman in 1957. He died on February 22, 1992.

He is buried at the Hillside Cemetery in Scotch Plains.
