= Carlile (surname) =

Carlile is an English habitational surname related to the city of Carlisle. Notable people with the surname include:

- Alex Carlile, Baron Carlile of Berriew, British politician
- Alipate Carlile, Australian Rules Football player
- Austin Carlile, lead singer for American metalcore band Of Mice & Men
- Brandi Carlile, American folk music singer/songwriter
- Declan Carlile, American ice hockey player
- Forbes Carlile, Australian Olympic swimming coach
- Hildred Carlile, British politician
- John S. Carlile, American senator
- Richard Carlile, British free press and universal suffrage advocate
- Wilson Carlile, British evangelist who founded Church Army

== See also ==
- Carlie
- Carlisle (surname)
- Carlyle (name)
