= Finger (disambiguation) =

A finger is an appendage found on the hands of humans and primates.

Finger or fingers may also refer to:

- The finger, a vulgar hand gesture
- Finger (unit), several units of measurement based on the width of a finger

== Places ==
=== Canada ===
- The Finger (Alberta), a mountain in the Canadian Rockies
- Finger, Manitoba, a community
- Finger Lake, Finger-Tatuk Provincial Park, British Columbia

=== United States ===
- Finger, North Carolina
- Finger, Tennessee
- Finger Lakes, a group of lakes in New York
- Finger Lake (Alaska)
- Finger Mountain, Alaska
- Finger Peaks

=== Antarctica ===
- Finger Mountain

== Arts and entertainment ==
- Fingers (1941 film), a British drama
- Fingers (1978 film), an American drama
- The Finger (band), a hardcore punk band
- Fingers (album), by Airto Moreira, 1973
- The Finger (album), by Babyland, 2004
- "Fingers", a song by Pink from the 2006 album I'm Not Dead
- "Fingers" (song), a song by Zayn from the 2018 album Icarus Falls
- "Finger" (Bottom), a 1995 television episode
- "Fingers" (C.A.T.S. Eyes), a 1985 television episode
- "The Finger" (CSI), a 2002 television episode

== People ==
- Finger (surname), including a list of people with the name
- Rollie Fingers (born 1946), American baseball player
- Johnnie Fingers (John Peter Moylett, born 1956), Irish pianist, founding member The Boomtown Rats
- Michael Fingleton (born 1938), Irish businessman, known as Fingers in the banking community
- Greg "Fingers" Taylor, American harmonica player
- Larry Heard (born 1960), American DJ, record producer and musician known as Mr. Fingers

== Other uses ==
- Cadbury Fingers, a biscuit
- Finger (protocol), in computer networking
- Fingers (game), a drinking game
- IAI Finger, an upgraded version of the IAI Nesher aircraft
- Finger, or jet bridge, an airport passenger boarding bridge
- Ladies' fingers, another name for okra
- Finger (spider), a genus of spiders in the family Salticidae
- Finger (horse), a Japanese racehorse

== See also ==
- Fingering (disambiguation)
- Finger Lake (disambiguation)
- Finger Point (disambiguation)
