= Ice Road Truckers season 4 =

Season of television series

Ice Road Truckers
- Season 4
- No. of episodes: 16

Release
- Original network: History
- Original release: June 6 – October 3, 2010

Season chronology
- ← Previous; Season 3 Next → Season 5

This is a list of Ice Road Truckers Season 4 episodes.

At the top of the world, there's a job only a few would dare. The ice road truckers are back. Last year, they chased their fortunes over the frozen gauntlet of the Dalton. But this season, Alaska's most fearsome road is just the beginning, as the new riders of the last frontier head off the Dalton and over the frozen rivers of Alaska's outback. This year, the ice road truckers finally break through.

— Thom Beers, opening of the show, season 4

Season 4 of Ice Road Truckers premiered on June 6, 2010.

== Returning drivers ==
Debogorski, Rowland, Jessee, Hall, and Kelly continue driving the Dalton Highway for Carlile this season. Debogorski had a good season, stopping to help drivers in trouble on multiple occasions. Rowland spent the season trying to avoid the Department of Transport (DOT) Weigh station. Jessee was assigned some of the toughest loads, to be taken over some of the roughest roads. Kelly started out the season with goals to achieve: she wanted to try hauling heavier, bigger loads and have a go at push-truck driving; she also aimed to save enough money to buy back her horse. Both goals she eventually achieved.

== New drivers ==
- Greg Boadwine: At 27, Boadwine is starting his second season with Carlile, after his first one ended early due to his overturning his truck. He is grateful that his employers have given him another chance; at the same time, he feels he has a long way to go in order to regain their full trust.
- Ray Veilleux: Veilleux, 44, ran his own construction business in Kalispell, Montana until it failed as a result of the U.S. housing industry crash. He signed on with Carlile and has worked his way up from freight yard duty to making ice road runs.
- Merv Gilbertson: Gilbertson is a second-generation haul road trucker, running Big State Logistics based out of Fairbanks. Except for one Carlile delivery by Jessee late in the season, Gilbertson and his convoys make all the supply runs to Bettles shown this season.

== Route and destinations ==
Dalton Highway: The truckers make stops at Fairbanks, Coldfoot, Deadhorse and the oilfields of Prudhoe Bay as in Season 3, as well as the following new destinations:

- Bettles, Alaska: Located near the center of Alaska along the remains of the Hickel Highway, this small town is accessible from the Dalton only by driving over frozen swampland.
- Nuiqsut, Alaska: Located west of Deadhorse, Nuiqsut is accessible by an ice road connecting it to the Dalton Highway during the winter.

Some heavy haul loads bound for Prudhoe Bay originated in Anchorage and reached Fairbanks via the Glenn Highway and George Parks Highway before going on the Dalton.

== Final load counts ==
- Veilleux – 19
- Rowland – 18
- Jessee – 17
- Kelly – 17
- Debogorski – 16
- Boadwine – 11

== Episodes ==
No. overall	No. in season	Title	Original release date
37	1	"Breaking Through"	June 6, 2010
The truckers on the Dalton Highway must move 2500 loads totaling nearly 50 million pounds within 90 days. This year, though, they have to make runs to the isolated towns of Bettles and Nuiqsut, crossing frozen rivers and swamps to deliver vital supplies. Jack is the first to start out of Fairbanks, taking a 100-foot pipe rack that has been needed at Prudhoe Bay since last year. Accompanied by a fleet of pilot cars, he eases his truck out of town and starts north. Even before Lisa gets moving, she hears of an accident at the north end of the road that has traffic blocked in both directions. She takes on a car carrier loaded with pickup trucks, but her convoy partner is unhappy with her slow speed and trades loads with her, much to her dissatisfaction. The accident is cleared in time for her to reach Prudhoe without any more delay. Two newer drivers, Greg Boadwine and Ray Veilleux, each take a load of pipes north from Fairbanks. Greg tries to beat Jack to Prudhoe but comes up just short at the end, while Ray tries to go over Atigun Pass at night without tire chains. Sliding to a stop, he realizes his mistake and chains up before starting again and finishing the trip. Other truckers make a first attempt to reach Bettles and break their tires partway through the river ice, but they manage to ease across and finish the supply run. After checking in at Fairbanks and receiving a priest's blessing for both himself and his truck, Alex sets out with a load of pipes. He runs into a thermal inversion on Atigun that affects his tires' traction and threatens to set off an avalanche, but comes over the top safely and is the first trucker to reach Prudhoe Bay. The next morning, he makes a side trip over the Colville River to Nuiqsut, delivering tires and lumber as Hugh arrives in Fairbanks to start work.
38	2	"The Polar Bear Returns"	June 13, 2010
A whiteout south of Prudhoe presents a hazard for both Jack and Greg, heading south with a damaged fuel storage tank and a load of lumber, respectively. As Greg gets clear of it, he learns of a fuel tanker that has gone off the road and must be pumped out; seeing the wreck makes him rethink his need to outrun Jack, and he stops at Coldfoot for the night. Jack drives on through the night to bring the tank to Fairbanks for urgent repairs. Lisa goes north with a load of odds and ends - lumber, steel, a pickup truck - and develops brake trouble soon after starting out. After trying unsuccessfully to fix the problem herself, she starts back toward town only to come across her previous convoy partner, who quickly gets her running again. Though her self-esteem suffers at the need to have someone help her twice in a row, she soon comes to the rescue of a trucker stuck in the snowdrifts. As Ray takes a load of pipes north, he develops an antifreeze leak that becomes a severe problem just short of Prudhoe. Once he nurses his truck into town, he learns at the repair shop that he will either have to wait for parts to be delivered or get the truck towed back to Fairbanks. After Hugh checks in and takes some pipes from Fairbanks, well behind Alex and his own cargo of pipes, a pickup passes him and almost skids off the road. Alex hits the whiteout near Prudhoe and goes over a hill too fast, knocking over some road markers, but reaches Prudhoe safely. Hugh, meanwhile, tries to climb a steep grade without tire chains and ends up sliding to a stop; traffic backs up behind him as he struggles to chain up, and he eventually gets moving and arrives at Prudhoe just behind Alex.
39	3	"Facing Down the Blow"	June 20, 2010
The first major storm of the season brings dangerous wind chills and severely reduced visibility on the road. In Fairbanks, Greg and Ray roll into town with their loads; the problem with Ray's truck proved to be easily fixable in Prudhoe Bay. Greg waits out the storm and takes his truck in for inspection, but learns that he needs new tires. Ray heads out with a load of pipes. Twice during the trip, he slides to a stop while trying to climb hills without his tire chains; embarrassed, he puts them on as traffic backs up behind him. Dashboard warnings of engine trouble prompt him to consider quitting. Lisa, still eager to prove herself as a potential heavy hauler, gets a load of pipes that is her heaviest one of the season to date. She heads out from Fairbanks into the storm and develops mechanical trouble, which turns out to be a bad speed sensor, but decides to push on. Before reaching Atigun, she stops to chain up and makes it safely through the second spot that brought Ray to a standstill. Jack picks up two CONEX containers and heads south from Prudhoe with Hugh and Alex, both hauling trailer flatbeds. As they hit the storm, Jack's air line becomes clogged with snow and he makes a risky stop to change the filter, starting up again just before his battery completely drains from the cold. At Coldfoot, Hugh stops for the night while Jack receives orders to drop his load and take a full fuel tanker up to Prudhoe - back into the storm. Along the way, he helps to get a stranded pilot car moving again. At the weigh station near Fairbanks, Hugh learns that his log book is out of compliance but is let off with a warning. Alex has to go in for a performance review and medical exam in Fairbanks due to knocking over the road markers, and is soon cleared to return to work.
40	4	"Monster Storm Over Atigun"	June 27, 2010
In Fairbanks, Lisa picks up a load of oil pipeline supports and must get them to Prudhoe within 48 hours as a huge storm settles in near Atigun. She spends the night at Coldfoot and heads out with several other truckers; eventually they pull off the road and wait for the weather to clear, then punch through the fresh snowdrifts to get over Atigun and finish their run. In Prudhoe, Ray loses some time chaining down a pair of flatbeds, then has to wait until the next day to start his run with a convoy. They pass a new wreck while fighting through the drifts, and soon get off the road to wait out the worst of the storm before making it to Fairbanks safely. Greg takes a load of pipes north from Fairbanks, intending to drop it off at Coldfoot and go back down for a second load; he skids out briefly on a steep downhill stretch, but gets control again and completes the first run. In Prudhoe, Alex goes south with a flatbed and eases through the poor visibility at Atigun before stopping briefly at Coldfoot, where one of the road markers he knocked over has been left for him as a joke. Hugh is told to take a load of pipes and follow Jack north from Fairbanks, but sets out on his own after waiting three hours for Jack to show up. Jack later starts north with a vacuum truck, intending to reach Prudhoe that night. They both end up at Coldfoot that night; the next morning, Hugh again becomes impatient, leaves his load there, and returns to Fairbanks for another one. Jack goes on ahead and gets to Prudhoe one day later than he planned. Meanwhile, Bettles needs 12 loads of supplies within 30 days, but the ice over the Jim River is in poor shape and must be tested before every run. A pickup truck breaks partway through, so the latest shipment must be delayed.
41	5	"Trapped on Thin Ice"	July 11, 2010
In Fairbanks, Hugh and Alex each pick up a load of pipes bound for Prudhoe; Alex rolls out well ahead of Hugh, who is still determined to outdo him in loads delivered. That night, Alex arrives in Coldfoot first, but Hugh parks his own truck so as to keep Alex's blocked in and unable to leave. Alex gets an early start, breaking a pickup truck's side view mirror as he noses out, but Hugh soon catches up and brings his load in first when Alex takes a wrong turn at the end of the road. Jack takes on a load of fuel that is urgently needed in Nuiqsut. The sloshing contents threaten to pitch him off the road as he climbs Atigun Pass, but he comes over the peak safely and turns off onto the slick ice of the Colville River. A windstorm kicks up, reducing visibility to near-zero and forcing him to make a long, risky stop on the ice before moving on to his destination. Lisa gets her first oversize load, a pipe rack meant for Prudhoe, and eases out of Fairbanks with the help of a pilot car. The combination of fresh snowdrifts and the wide cargo force her into close calls as southbound trucks pass her. Crossing Atigun, she drives through a long patch of ice fog and then is almost pulled over by the North Slope police before delivering the rack. In Fairbanks, Ray gets an overnight rush job: deliver oil pipeline supports to Prudhoe by the next morning. Shortly into this night run, he stops to check his brakes and finds that one of them appears to have caught fire. He cannot smell any smoke, so he guesses that the problem is a buildup of snow, melting and vaporizing from the friction heat. He moves on without stopping at Coldfoot and fights to stay awake through the late hours; a momentary lack of attention nearly sends him off the road, but he recovers and rolls on to Prudhoe.
42	6	"Danger at 55 Below"	July 18, 2010
As extreme cold strikes the state, Alex - northbound from Fairbanks with a load of pipes - stops to pick up a hitchhiker. After putting up with the man's incessant talking, Alex drops him off at the Yukon River Bridge and soon develops steering wheel trouble. He switches loads at Coldfoot with a southbound driver and takes on flatbeds, so he can get his truck to the shop, but has to free up that trailer's brakes before he can go. Once he gets to Fairbanks, he learns that his steering column needs repair. As Hugh goes north with his own pipes, he finds them not strapped down to his liking, and later trades barbs with a driver who is annoyed at his presence on the road. He later brings flatbeds south from Prudhoe, still smarting over the exchange. Lisa, eager to make up for time lost due to storm delays, stops at the weigh station on her way to Fairbanks. A truck inspection reveals missing emergency equipment and leads to a $160 fine; after paying this, she goes in for a medical exam to keep her certification up to date. Jack picks up his next load, a pipe rack, and starts for Prudhoe with a rookie pilot car driver. Miscommunication leads to close calls along the way, involving blind corners and a flock of white-tailed ptarmigan on the road, but their teamwork improves and Jack has an encouraging word for the driver at Prudhoe. Ray, coming north toward Atigun with a load of pipes, decides not to chain his tires in order to save time; he spins out close to the edge of the road, but comes over the peak and delivers his cargo. He then gets a load of groceries bound for Nuiqsut and must take his time on the slick ice of the Colville River to bring it in safely. A convoy of fuel tankers makes a side run to Bettles, first making sure that the Jim River ice will support the weight, and avalanche control crews go to work clearing out trouble spots on the slopes overlooking Atigun
43	7	"Avalanche!"	July 25, 2010
Truckers in Fairbanks are scrambling to get on the road and stay ahead of an approaching storm, as the heavy snowfall near Atigun increases the danger of avalanches. Hugh, Greg, and Ray each take a load of pipes toward Prudhoe; Greg tries unsuccessfully to get a different load, while Hugh has to knock his trailer brakes loose before he can go. Many drivers stop at Coldfoot for the night, but Ray pushes on and brings his cargo in safely. Not long after he clears Atigun Pass, an avalanche closes the road. Traffic backs up in both directions as a heavy-duty snowblower is brought in to clear the slide. The next morning, Greg - having stopped at Coldfoot - eases his way past the danger zones and goes on to Prudhoe. Jack, coming north with structural steel panels, finds himself stopped dead south of Atigun when a second avalanche occurs. He soon gets a clear road and continues to Prudhoe, as does Hugh, who risks a head-on collision by moving into the southbound lane to stay out of the snowdrifts. Once he delivers his load, he picks up trailer flatbeds to take back to Fairbanks. Meanwhile, Lisa takes her truck to the Fairbanks shop to have the speed sensor replaced, expecting to get back on the road quickly. However, the mechanic finds a more serious problem: an oil leak from her differential. Once the repairs are done, it is too late for her to start a run that day.
44	8	"Lisa's Monster Megahaul"	August 1, 2010
Jack and Lisa are sent down to Anchorage to help veteran driver Carey Hall transport the season's heaviest load to date: a modular building weighing 209,450 pounds. It is too heavy for a single truck to handle, so Carey plans to steer it in front while Jack and Lisa push from behind. The three must carefully coordinate their maneuvering, engine speed, and gear selection in order to get the building to Prudhoe. After a rough start that fails to impress Carey and Jack, Lisa gets a better feel for this type of trucking and helps deliver the power needed to move the load over Atigun. After three days and 850 miles, the trio brings it to Prudhoe safely. Ray spins out on a hill while hauling a refrigerated van toward Prudhoe. Once he chains his tires, he finds that his trailer brakes are now stuck due to a frozen air line. It takes him four hours to free them, during which he voices his frustration to the camera crew riding with him. Meanwhile, Greg and Alex are each taking pipes north; Alex eases past the spot where Ray spun out, while Greg hears his pipes rattling and shifting and stops to strap them down more securely. Once he delivers his load, he heads toward Fairbanks with a load of lumber only to come across a stopped northbound fuel tanker, which he offers to haul the rest of the way. It is his first such load and poses risks due to sloshing liquid, but he gets it to Prudhoe without incident.
45	9	"Blood on the Dalton"	August 8, 2010
Alex takes a load of lumber north from Fairbanks, trying to beat a deadline of 5:00 the next afternoon. Shortly after starting out, he encounters a pickup truck that has rolled off the road. Stopping to give first aid to the two passengers, he learns that a third one has apparently gone missing. As paramedics arrive to take the victims to the hospital, Alex gives the police as much information as he can and then goes on his way. He stops at Coldfoot for the night and reaches Prudhoe the next day, with minutes to spare before the deadline. At the Prudhoe outskirts, Lisa swerves to avoid a plow truck and ends up sliding into a ditch. Though the plow pulls her out and there is no damage to her truck, she worries about getting fired. After pulling in and filing a report on herself, she is told that the incident was minor and will not affect her record; however, her pride is wounded and she fears that her reputation will be damaged. In Fairbanks, Ray picks up a pipe sleigh that needs to be in Prudhoe that night, but his truck has frozen up due to being shut off overnight; it takes six hours for him to get it thawed out. He drives late into the night, not stopping at Coldfoot, but eventually pulls over to get a little sleep. He wakes up to find that his arm has gone numb, then has himself checked out at the hospital once he reaches Prudhoe. The problem turns out to be a pinched nerve caused by his sleeping position, and he is soon back on the road. Greg stops at the Fairbanks shop to check on the repairs to his truck, and is called in to talk with the boss because its onboard computer indicates that he has been speeding. He is eventually let off with a warning, but wonders if he is running out of second chances at Carlile. Hugh gets an early start out of Fairbanks with a load of pipes, but the glare of the morning sun creates visibility hazards and nearly leads him into a collision. He takes a risk by trying to climb a steep run without chains and starts to slide, but makes it over the top and on to Prudhoe, 50 miles ahead of Alex. By the time Alex comes in, Hugh has taken a flatbed intended for him and headed south.
46	10	"The Ace vs. the Ice"	August 15, 2010
In Fairbanks, Jack gets a late-afternoon call to haul a load of pipes to Bettles, only the third such run of his ice road career. Once he gets to the start of the side road, he stops for the night; the next morning, he negotiates animal and driving hazards until coming to the Jim River. After carefully scouting the weakened ice, he pushes ahead and starts to break through before reaching the other side. Once he gets to Bettles and finds someone to accept the cargo, he injures his head while unloading it and gets bandaged up, then starts back to Fairbanks. Coming south from Prudhoe, Greg stops to pick up a manlift, abandoned by another driver, and take it to Fairbanks. It is his first oversized load, and he has a few close calls with oncoming trucks before continuing on toward his destination. Lisa tries for an early start to take pipes north from Fairbanks, but her truck's door locks have frozen up and she loses some time thawing them out. After driving long stretches of slick roads, she pulls into Prudhoe but runs into trouble again, this time with frozen landing gear on her trailer; a freight yard worker helps her unload and get on her way. In Fairbanks, Alex starts north with a load of pipes before Hugh reports in; Hugh picks up two huge reels of electrical cable, his heaviest load to date at 90,000 pounds, and moves out as well. The same slick uphill run brings both men to a brief stop, causing Alex to briefly slide backwards down the slope and Hugh to spin out without his tire chains. Alex gets to Prudhoe ten minutes ahead and takes a load of motors south, while Hugh picks up a refrigerated van for the return trip and passes Alex when the latter stops to check the straps on his load.
47	11	"A Rookie's Nightmare"	August 22, 2010
In Prudhoe, Alex looks for a load to take back to Fairbanks, but there are none, as Ray got the last one (a set of flatbeds) just before he came in. Trying to stay ahead of Alex, Ray skids into the ditch and ends up burying his truck's wheels deep in the loose snow. Other drivers try to pull him loose, but the tow chains break and they resort to digging him out. Alex stops to help with the effort; after four hours of digging, the group is able to pull him back up onto the road. After calling in at Coldfoot to report the incident, he has to go in for a drug test and driving review once he arrives in Fairbanks. The meeting ends without any penalty against him, though he must take his truck to the shop to be checked out before he can resume work. In Fairbanks, Hugh picks up a load of heaters, noting that they are not securely strapped down but starting off quickly to save time. He passes his trainer from the previous season, who notices part of the load coming loose, and both pull over to secure it. They then see that one of the heaters has become damaged due to scraping against another one. When Hugh reaches Prudhoe, he quickly unloads and heads south; however, word of the damaged load soon reaches Fairbanks and he is called in to discuss the matter. Hugh claims that the straps were always tight and is let off with a caution, but the dispatchers take the matter far more seriously and plan to watch him more closely in the future, mentioning that Hugh may be charged for the damage. Lisa goes north from Fairbanks with a reel of electrical cable and a cage intended to keep bears from entering the oil fields. The sheer size of the cage gives her trouble with straps and chains coming loose on the road, and she even finds one of her straps breaking along the way. After repeated stops to secure the load, she delivers it to Prudhoe safely.
48	12	"The Dalton Strikes Back"	August 29, 2010
Carey comes up from Anchorage with a 114,000-pound "pig launcher" module, used for cleaning and inspecting oil pipelines. The load requires two additional trucks to help push it, but one of them - Jack - is late reporting in and the run starts without him. While Carey is stopped to help fix a flat tire on the other push truck, Jack turns up and the team starts into the first big uphill runs. Jack comes loose from the rear bumper, having missed a gear, and rushes to get back in place so Carey can make it over the hill. After a night's stay at Coldfoot, Jack is again late to get started, but he catches up in time for the run to Atigun. Once the load is at the summit, he moves in front to slow its descent on the other side, and the team reaches Prudhoe safely. Hugh starts north from Fairbanks with a load of pipes, early enough to pass the not-yet-open weigh station, and soon catches up to Ray, who is taking his own pipes north. They race each other to Coldfoot - an activity frowned upon by their superiors - and Ray briefly spins out in the southbound lane while trying to pull ahead. Hugh wins the race and continues on through the night to reach Prudhoe; Ray stops at Coldfoot, buys a meal gift certificate for Hugh as a prize, and continues to Prudhoe the next morning. He then picks up a drill rig and two explosives containers for the trip south. Coming north with a load of pipes, Alex hears of a state Department of Transportation inspection up ahead and worries about getting a ticket for a burned-out headlight. His truck passes, though, and he stops in Coldfoot to replace the bulb. Lisa, bringing her own pipes north, worries about encountering wildlife on the road after dark and spends the night in Coldfoot; once she reaches Prudhoe, she picks up a van of flammable materials for the return trip. Greg finds that his truck has sat in the shop all weekend without having its antifreeze leak checked. This is soon fixed and he takes some pipes north, but before long he smells burning oil. The problem is a bad wheel bearing that can cause the wheel to seize up if left untreated, so he drops his load and returns to Fairbanks.
49	13	"Convoy to Hell"	September 12, 2010
With spring approaching and temperatures rising, the ice road to Nuiqsut will soon disintegrate, cutting its only supply line. All six truckers are assigned to bring the village its last loads for the season; four of them have to drop off cargo at Prudhoe first. Shortly after the convoy sets out from Fairbanks, Lisa learns that she has been given the wrong load and must return to the Carlile yard to get the right one - a snowmobile bound for Nuiqsut. Jack is hauling a load of fuel that is needed there as well. With Greg in front, hauling structural steel members, the rest of the convoy inches past the site of a truck that has rolled off the road. Alex becomes impatient at Greg's slow pace and starts to speed up toward him, while Hugh tries to get ahead of Alex and Greg becomes annoyed with the latter's CB banter. By midday, they have passed Coldfoot and Lisa has caught up with them in time to hear of a storm up ahead. Eventually Alex drops to the rear of the group as visibility falls to almost zero in the blowing snow, and everyone slows down as night falls. They reach Prudhoe and Alex, Hugh, Greg, and Ray pick up their Nuiqsut loads, but the bad weather forces everyone to wait 36 hours until they can start off again. They have a rare meal together, passing time as best they can, and Jack teaches Lisa how to change out an air filter. Once the storm breaks, the truckers ease onto the Colville River for the last stretch - an ice road that reminds Alex and Hugh of the ones they drove in Canada. As they reach Nuiqsut and deliver their loads, they get a chance to look around town, including Greg's visit to the school whose classroom supplies he has just hauled in. Alex has transported paint and furniture for a church; Hugh, a riverboat and some lumber; Ray, a boat motor and some furniture. Jack and Lisa head back to Fairbanks while the other four participate in a potlatch ceremony thrown by the village, sharing a meal and traditional dances.
50	14	"A Legend Meets His End"	September 19, 2010
As Lisa sets up for a push-trucking job to move a 100-ton modular building from Fairbanks to Prudhoe, a bad air valve puts her several hours behind schedule getting out of town. As soon as she starts up the road, another malfunction occurs, but she quickly finds the problem - a loose air hose - and fixes it so she can keep moving. Once she catches up to the other two drivers on the job, one of them has to stop briefly for suspected engine trouble; it turns out to be only vaporizing snow and they continue on. Slush and flying snow dust on Atigun pose hazards for the trio, but they bring the load in safely and the other two express their respect for Lisa's developing skill as a push trucker. Headed north to Prudhoe with a load of pipes, Jack is escorting Doug, a trucker who wants to scatter the ashes of his father - himself a veteran of the haul road - up on Atigun. Doug has not driven the road in 20 years, and he makes a risky stop on a hill to check his own pipes. As they stop on Atigun so that Doug can spread the ashes, Greg rolls past with a large reel of plastic pipe, not knowing about the reason for the stop. Ray sees Greg's behavior as disrespectful, sparking an argument as all three truckers move on to Prudhoe. Meanwhile, Alex stops at Finger Mountain while bringing a set of flatbeds south to Fairbanks, and collects a rock sample that appears to contain some gold. At the weigh station outside of town, his truck and logbook are inspected, leading to a citation but no fine.
51	15	"Deadly Melt"	September 26, 2010
With the season in its final week, truckers are rushing to move loads as the ice on the Dalton melts away. A bridge over the Dietrich River is threatened by a buildup of water pressure behind the remaining ice; crews are dispatched to bore tunnels through that layer to relieve the stress. Elsewhere, the thawing of the Yukon River puts homes near its banks at risk of flooding. As Jack and Lisa head north with jet fuel and pipes, respectively, they hear of a truck that slid into a ditch and stop to chain up so they can better approach the slick roads. They reach Prudhoe that night, but not before Jack receives a citation for not having the proper hazardous-materials paperwork on his load. Once Hugh starts out of Fairbanks with a load of pipes, he stops at the weigh station and is told that his log book is out of compliance and shows evidence of speeding. He denies the latter, is let off with a warning, and continues to Prudhoe at his usual fast pace. Greg picks up a load of groceries, left by another trucker, and heads north to follow Ray, who has pipes and nitrogen containers. Crossing Atigun, they face water overflows and an oncoming convoy that refuses to give up the right of way. After reaching Prudhoe, they join Jack, Lisa, and Alex for a drink and start a friendly wager over who can haul the most loads by season's end.
52	16	"New King of the Dalton"	October 3, 2010
On the final day of the ice road season, Ray and Greg are each hauling a pair of cement powder tanks south from Prudhoe. Only Ray stops to chain his tires as they approach Atigun; Greg tries to pass him during the climb, but cannot due to Ray's maneuvering in order to maintain traction. Eventually Greg spins out and stops to chain up, and the incident later leads to animosity between the two when the boss sides with Ray after they both reach Fairbanks. Jack brings a load of jet fuel south toward Fairbanks, passing a snowplow stuck in the ditch, and struggles to reach the top of Atigun on the wet, slick roads. Once he is over and down, he and Ray laugh about Greg's mishap; later he gets a flat tire and changes it before finishing the run. Lisa comes south with a pair of flatbeds, and stops at Coldfoot to buy a meal gift certificate for the plow driver who pulled her out of the ditch in "Blood on the Dalton." Once she finishes the run, she heads home with enough money to buy back a horse she had once owned as a pet. Hugh takes a reel of cable and a pickup truck north from Fairbanks and hurries to Prudhoe, intent on picking up one last load. However, the boss - who has disapproved of his driving habits all season long - refuses to give him one and comments that he may not have a future on the Dalton. Alex hauls a pickup and assorted building materials from Prudhoe to Coldfoot, his last load, then visits one of the victims from the accident he saw in "Blood on the Dalton." He learns that the third passenger, whom no one was able to find at the time, fled the scene only to be arrested some time later. Final load counts: Ray - 19; Hugh - 18; Jack - 17; Lisa - 17; Alex - 16; Greg - 11
