= Finfer =

Finfer is a surname. Notable people with the surname include:

- David Finfer (1942–2023), American film editor
- Stephen Finfer (born 1962), American music publisher, manager, attorney, television producer, and business executive

== See also ==
- Finger (surname)
