= Pointing finger =

Pointing finger may refer to:

- Index finger, in human anatomy
- Index (typography), an old punctuation mark which consists of a hand with extended index finger
- The Pointing Finger (1919 film), an American film starring Mary MacLaren
- The Pointing Finger (1922 film), a British film directed by George Ridgwell
- The Pointing Finger (1933 film), a British film directed by George Pearson
- Pointing the Finger, a 1981 album by Kevin Coyne

== See also ==
- Finger Point (disambiguation)
