= Finger minor =

Scientific classification
- Kingdom: Animalia
- Phylum: Arthropoda
- Subphylum: Chelicerata
- Class: Arachnida
- Order: Araneae
- Infraorder: Araneomorphae
- Family: Salticidae
- Genus: Finger
- Species: F. minor

Binomial name
- Finger minor Wiśniewski & Wesołowska, 2024

Species of spider

Finger minor is a species of jumping spider in the genus Finger that lives in Uganda.
