= Ice Road Truckers season 5 =

Season of television series

Ice Road Truckers
- Season 5
- No. of episodes: 16

Release
- Original network: History
- Original release: June 5 – September 25, 2011

Season chronology
- ← Previous; Season 4 Next → Season 6

This is a list of Ice Road Truckers Season 5 episodes. There were 16 episodes, originally broadcast between June 5, 2011, and September 25, 2011. During the fifth season, the show returned to Canada, with filming on the ice roads of Manitoba.

== Locations ==
The focus of this season is split between two locations. One group drives the Dalton Highway, moving freight between Fairbanks and Deadhorse with occasional side trips to Nuiqsut and Anchorage. Meanwhile, a second group transports loads between Winnipeg, Manitoba, and several remote communities over winter and ice roads.

== Returning drivers ==
Debogorski and Rowland return to Canada, and Yemm (seasons 1 and 2) joins them for this season to drive the ice roads in Manitoba, Debogorski for First Nations Transport, and Rowland and Yemm for Polar Industries (also hauling loads for First Nations for the first eight episodes under a contract through Polar). For Carlile, Kelly and three other truckers haul freight on the Dalton, and Hall appears in two episodes to deliver heavy loads. Kromm returns to train rookie drivers, notably Redmon and Sieber, and later advises Lane Keator to fire Redmon.

== New drivers ==
- Dave Redmon: Redmon, 45, is an Alabama native with 25 years of over-the-road trucking experience. In 2010, he, Yemm, and Kelly spent two months hauling loads on the dangerous roads in India (see IRT: Deadliest Roads, below). This season marks his first year of ice road trucking, but he is ultimately fired due to concerns about his driving performance and attitude toward other truckers (especially Tony Molesky, who abandoned Redmon at Coldfoot halfway through his first training run on the Dalton).
- Tony Molesky: Molesky is a 19-year veteran of the ice roads, and like Kromm, serves as a safety and driver instructor for Carlile. In the season premiere, he describes a recent accident in which he had to swerve into a ditch to avoid a head-on collision with an oncoming rookie driver. His truck took a glancing blow, scattering debris which he later returns to pick up; by the season's end, the truck is repaired and put back in service. (He was also seen briefly in Season 3 episode 3 as Rowland's co-driver.)
- Maya Sieber: Sieber is a 27-year-old resident of New York City, with three years' trucking experience on its roads. Like Redmon, this is her first year on the ice.
- Vlad Pleskot: Pleskot is one of Polar's drivers. In Season 7, he and Rowland formed their own company.
- Mark Kohaykewych: Mark owns Polar Industries, and drives a pilot car for an oversized load convoy Pleskot, Rowland and Yemm make to St. Theresa Point (episodes 4 and 5). Even though Mark is rarely seen at the wheel of a big rig, he is seen in the opening credits as one of the series’ stars by Season 7.

== Route and destinations ==
- Dalton Highway: Truckers make stops at Fairbanks, Coldfoot, and Deadhorse as before. Kelly and Molesky begin a heavy haul from Anchorage via the Glenn and George Parks Highways before reaching the Dalton (episodes 6 and 7).
- Manitoba/Ontario ice roads: Truckers haul freight on the ice roads to re-supply isolated communities that have no other economical way to bring in materials. Communities serviced by the truckers during Season 5 include Oxford House, Red Sucker Lake, Bloodvein, Little Grand Rapids, St. Theresa Point, Garden Hill, Tadoule Lake and Lac Brochet and Victoria Beach in Manitoba, and Muskrat Dam in northwestern Ontario.

== Final load counts ==
Canada

- Debogorski – 22
- Rowland – 21
- Yemm – 20

Alaska

- Kelly – 28
- Redmon – 27
- Molesky – 25
- Sieber – 22

== Episodes ==
The on-screen graphics for the type and weight of each load hauled featured in the first four seasons were discontinued in Season 5, now only showing the time of day or temperature depending on the situation.

| No. overall | No. in season | Title | Original release date |
|---|---|---|---|
| 53–54 | 1–2 | "Pushing the Edge" | June 5, 2011 |
| 53–54 | 1–2 | "Ice Road Rage" | June 5, 2011 |
The two-hour season premiere. With Carlile needing to move 1500 loads up the Dalton in 90 days, Lisa reports in and take a load of pipes up from Fairbanks. She leads a convoy of heavy haulers, including Carey Hall, who needs her help to pull his own freight up a steep incline. After a problem with tow hooks snapping in the cold, they continue on to Prudhoe, the first drivers of the season to arrive. Returning to Fairbanks, Lisa takes on a second load of pipes and pushes a spun-out truck out of the ditch on her way north. When Alabama trucker Dave Redmon arrives in Fairbanks, he is paired up with 19-year veteran Tony Molesky as an escort, to his discontent. They head out with a load of diesel fuel, Tony driving the first half and Dave the second. Dave's problem with shifting gears on the steep grades leads Tony to decide, at Prudhoe, that he needs at least one more escorted trip before doing runs on his own. This decision irritates Dave greatly; on the way back to Coldfoot, the two get into a long argument that results in Tony leaving Dave there the next morning. New York trucker Maya Sieber also reports in, takes a road test, and is cleared to start training. She rides shotgun on a fuel run, during which she sees a flipped pickup truck in a ditch, and later meets Lisa in Prudhoe. Meanwhile, Hugh, Rick, and Alex return to the Canadian ice roads, driving in Manitoba this season to re-supply local communities; Rick has gone into business for himself. In Winnipeg, Hugh and Rick sign on with Polar Industries, while Alex starts with First Nations Trucking. After watching the demolition of a beaver dam blocking the road, Hugh and Rick take on loads of emergency building supplies bound for the Cree community of Oxford House, 620 miles away. The road is rough, running over frozen swamps and rivers, and the pair negotiate thin river ice and a bent rim on Hugh's truck to bring in their loads. Alex is sent out for a 700-mile run to Red Sucker Lake with a load of groceries; he finds his own share of road hazards, including water overflows on the ice, but completes his delivery and meets Hugh on the road.
| 55 | 3 | "Wrong Turn & Burned" | June 12, 2011 |
In Fairbanks, Lisa picks up a car hauler loaded with pickup trucks and remembers the trouble she had with this load the previous season. After a day-long trip and a battle with fatigue, she delivers it to Prudhoe with a sense of vindication. While taking a load of diesel fuel north, Tony stops at the site of his recent accident to pick up debris left by his truck. Dave is still in Coldfoot after being left there by Tony, so Phil Kromm, Carlile's driver trainer, drives up to get him. Dave drives on the way back to Fairbanks as Phil offers advice; once they have returned, their boss decides to consider both Phil's and Tony's opinions and figure out what is next for Dave. After passing a drug test and taking a rough run in the trucking simulator, Maya spends a night relaxing at Chena Hot Springs in preparation for the start of her driver training the next day. In Winnipeg, Hugh and Rick report in at First Nations for their next loads - Hugh with supplies to Little Grand Rapids airport (260 miles), Rick with concrete barriers to Bloodvein (155 miles). Rick misses a turn and follows Hugh for five miles before realizing his mistake and backing up on the road, with the result that he delivers his load three hours late. Hugh is briefly delayed by a plugged air valve, but reaches the airport safely. Meanwhile, Alex picks up a load of fish at Red Sucker Lake and hauls it to Winnipeg, passing one abandoned passenger truck from an earlier year and another one in a ditch.
| 56 | 4 | "Fire on Ice" | June 19, 2011 |
In Winnipeg, Hugh and Rick team up with another driver to transport the three sections of an airport terminal building to St. Theresa Point, 550 miles away. Each section weighs 86,000 pounds, more than any other load on this road to date. Rick dents one of his rims on a bumpy stretch; by the time Hugh jury-rigs a repair job, the convoy has lost the whole afternoon. On the second day, they reach a long stretch of hairpin turns, which damage the side of Rick's section when he gets hung up in them. The third day of the trip brings them to a lake crossing whose weight limit is slightly less than the weight of each truck. Meanwhile, Alex picks up a forklift bound for St. Theresa Point and six boats for the village of Garden Hill. Once he drops off the forklift, he makes his way through a newly opened, 8-mile lake crossing and brings the boats in. In Fairbanks, Dave is cleared to start making solo runs and is assigned to Hugh's old truck. After a test drive, he heads north with a load of pipes and is surprised to hear Tony on the radio. This time, he successfully climbs the steep grade that stopped him before, then drives through blowing snow to reach Prudhoe. Maya hauls lumber and material hoppers with Phil riding shotgun, but a near miss with a southbound truck prompts her to trade places for a while. After a stop to check a flat tire, she drives again and completes the run to Prudhoe.
| 57 | 5 | "Under the Hammer" | June 26, 2011 |
In Manitoba, the airport terminal convoy eases across the lake crossing and reaches St. Theresa Point that night. The third driver clips a power line and pulls down its pole with his trailer. By the time a utility crew cuts the line and safely removes the line, it is so late that unloading the buildings must wait until morning. After the convoy complete the delivery, the drivers relax with a curling match. In Garden Hill, Alex picks up a load of recyclable materials bound for Winnipeg and hears about the downed power line before setting out. He barely misses two oncoming passenger vehicles, nearly spins out, and has his trailer come loose at night due to snow caked in the hitch. Once he clears the buildup, he hooks up again and continues the run. In Fairbanks, Lisa meets with Carey and another driver for a push-trucking job to move a 120-ton modular building. She misses a gear on the first major hill and drops out of position, but gets back in place to help move the load over Atigun Pass and through a whiteout to reach Prudhoe. Dave prepares to haul three CONEX containers to Coldfoot, but runs into multiple problems that delay his departure, including a stuck seat belt that he knocks loose with a hammer. Once he gets on the road with his convoy partner, he makes short work of the run and hurries back to Fairbanks for another load.
| 58 | 6 | "The Braking Point" | July 10, 2011 |
In Fairbanks, Dave gets a set of spool pipes as his first oversized load, but frozen trailer brakes delay his departure. He finds the Yukon River Bridge to be completely iced over and eases across, sliding badly before reaching the other side and arriving in Prudhoe that night. Maya takes a load of pipes north, with Phil riding shotgun to offer advice. She negotiates traffic and road challenges well until that evening, when she hears something rattling under the floorboard. A brief stop and under-hood check reveals nothing immediately, so Phil takes the wheel to see if he can hear it, leaving Maya disappointed at not being able to drive the entire run herself. Lisa and Tony are called down to Anchorage to move a pair of modular buildings. She learns from him that she will officially become a heavy hauler upon successful completion of this run. After easing under the freeway overpasses on their way out of town, the run proceeds without incident, with Tony leading until Lisa starts to crowd him; he then lets her take the lead. In Winnipeg, Alex, Hugh, and Rick are assigned loads of food to take on a three-day run to the settlements of Tadoule Lake and Lac Brochet, over 750 miles north. Alex is supposed to lead the group, but a brake problem (caused by an incorrectly connected air hose) delays him for an hour and allows Hugh and Rick to leave first. The police briefly pull Rick over for a logbook inspection, which he passes; late that night, he develops electrical problems on a bumpy stretch of road. He and Hugh find a broken wire that is causing a short circuit, then tape it down to continue their run. Soon afterward, Hugh has to stop and finds that his trailer is dragging on his tires, wearing them down and affecting his traction. These delays give Alex enough time to pass the two.
| 59 | 7 | "A Banged-Up Job" | July 17, 2011 |
Having spent the night in Coldfoot, Lisa and Tony head north with their modular buildings. On the tundra south of Prudhoe, Lisa barely avoids an oncoming truck and slides partway off the road. The two work together to help her get going again, and Tony drives lead as they complete the delivery. In light of this incident, the question of her transfer to the heavy haul division is left up to the Carlile bosses. In Fairbanks, Maya picks up a load of cable spools and starts out with Phil riding along. An exhaust leak into the cab sends the truck to the shop; once it is repaired later that morning, she starts the run again, ignoring disparaging radio talk from Dave. She drives the entire way to Prudhoe herself without incident. In Manitoba, Hugh and Rick have stopped at night to fix the problem with Hugh's trailer suspension. Although they reinflate its air bags enough to let him keep driving, he soon gets three flat tires on the rough roads and both stop for the night. The next morning, Rick drives the last 50 miles alone to deliver his load and bring help. Hugh, meanwhile, amuses himself by shooting at some of his old food supplies with a rifle he has brought along. Rick and other truckers drive back to pick up Hugh's load and swap trailers so he can take a usable one back to Winnipeg. Once Rick has the cargo, he makes a late-night run to bring it in. Finding an overturned passenger vehicle in a ditch, Alex gives its two occupants a ride and has to put up with their constant arguing as he finishes his run.
| 60 | 8 | "Meltdown!" | July 24, 2011 |
Reports of an approaching storm on the Dalton send drivers rushing to get on the road before conditions make the road impassable. In Fairbanks, Dave prepares to take a load of pipes, but a stuck trailer brake and a loose hitch delay his departure. By the time he approaches Atigun, the storm has forced several drivers to jettison their loads and turn back, and he does the same and returns to Coldfoot. Lisa learns that she will not become a heavy hauler at this time. Angry and disappointed, she goes north with a load of office supplies but ends up stopping at Coldfoot as well. Tony, hauling a load of explosives bound for Prudhoe, finds a truck in the ditch but does not stop to help due to the danger of his own cargo. As he encounters the worst of the storm, he decides to push on and brings the load in after fighting a near-total whiteout. Maya takes a load of pipes north on her first solo run, a load that must be delivered by day's end. She too has to deal with worsening visibility as the storm closes in and also reaches Prudhoe safely. The morning after reaching Lac Brochet, Rick unloads Hugh's cargo of groceries and voices his frustration over the events of this season. As he heads south, he spins out on a hill and is stranded until Hugh arrives in a snowcat to push him free. He gives Hugh a ride back to Hugh's truck, then keeps going south alone. As he, Hugh, and Alex return to Winnipeg, Rick's trailer suspension starts to malfunction as Hugh's did. Blaming the damage on rough driving by Hugh and Rick, the owner of First Nations fires both of them.
| 61 | 9 | "Road to Nowhere" | July 31, 2011 |
In Fairbanks, Lisa takes a pickup truck and some structural steel members north as reports of a fresh storm come in. She deals with a stubborn trailer hitch in the yard, followed by a tarp coming loose from the pickup on the road. Pushing through near-zero visibility conditions, she brings the load to Prudhoe. Dave drives up from Coldfoot to get the load of pipes he abandoned, but his cab's heater fails and makes the drive extremely uncomfortable. Finding miles of backed-up traffic due to the storm, he has to wait four hours until crews can clear a path to let trucks through. Passing ditched trucks in the backup and another after he gets clear, he picks up his load and brings it in. When Maya starts the day in Fairbanks, she learns that she has officially been issued her own truck, which is smaller and older than the one in which she trained. It has sat idle for months and must be towed into the shop to get it running; she takes advantage of the delay to buy some equipment, including a knife for protection. In Manitoba, Hugh and Rick switch to Polar Industries and pick up fuel tanks that are needed the Ontario community of Muskrat Dam, 400 miles away. When they stop at an RV park to fuel up, Rick finds that his truck's fuel tank is coming loose and straps it up as best he can before they go on. Later in the day, Hugh discovers that they have taken a wrong turn and must double back. The next morning, now half a day behind schedule, they ease across a 7-mile lake crossing only to discover on the other side that they have again gone down the wrong road. Alex, meanwhile, drives to St. Theresa Point to get a pickup truck and bring it back to Winnipeg for repairs. That evening, he finds a broken-down pickup in the ditch and takes its passengers to Winnipeg as well.
| 62 | 10 | "Rookie Rebellion" | August 7, 2011 |
After four days of winter storms, the weather clears and crews go to work reopening the road. Dave and Tony head north from Fairbanks with critical loads of groceries, and Maya goes with them to transport a pickup truck and other supplies. Tension among the three simmers as they start the run - Dave frustrated at Maya's slow pace and Tony's perception that he is disrespectful, Maya and Tony annoyed at Dave's habit of crowding them from behind. Dave eventually speeds ahead and reaches Coldfoot alone, but is ordered the next morning to regroup with them. After he again pulls away, Tony and Maya ease through the ripe avalanche conditions on Atigun. Dave reaches Prudhoe well ahead of them, picking up the only available load bound for Fairbanks (scrap material). Meanwhile, Lisa digs her truck out after spending four days stranded in Prudhoe. She gets a load destined for Anchorage, but gets a flat tire 50 miles into the trip as a result of pumping her brakes to melt built-up snow. After doubling back to Prudhoe for repairs, she makes the delivery and then takes a day off at home. In Ontario, Hugh and Rick retrace their path back from the 7-mile lake crossing and cover the last 100 miles to Muskrat Dam. Once they unload their fuel tanks and start back to Winnipeg, Rick drags his empty trailer through a ditch on the way out of the freight yard. A push from a loader puts him back on the road, but 50 miles into the return trip, he discovers that he has forgotten the paperwork for the load and must return to Muskrat Dam to get it. His truck stalls when he tries to turn around, and frustration leads him into a brief face-off with the camera crew. Hugh gives him a pull-start so he can get moving again.
| 63 | 11 | "Hittin' the Skids" | August 14, 2011 |
In Winnipeg, Hugh and Rick pick up fuel tanks destined for St. Theresa Point, but find themselves battling slick roads and hairpin turns. A jackknifed tanker is blocking the road, but Hugh pulls it straight so the run can continue. After another truck begins to spin out and nearly hits Hugh, he and Rick bring their loads in safely. Alex, on the road back to Winnipeg, sideswipes a car parked in a snowbank that is being used by the camera crew following him. In Fairbanks, Lisa gets a load of pipe sections that is so long (100 feet) that it needs a special rear dolly instead of a standard trailer to support it. That dolly soon moves out of alignment with the truck and begins to swing wildly on corners, posing a hazard to oncoming truckers. She cannot get it realigned herself, but does get help in Coldfoot; later that night, she discovers that two of the dolly's tires have completely fallen off. With help from another trucker, she straps up the axle so that it will not collapse, then limps into Prudhoe to finish the run. Tony and Maya head north from Fairbanks to pick up loads that were abandoned during the storm (pipes and cable spools, respectively) and take them on to Prudhoe. Both express their low opinions of Dave and later stop on the road to share a meal of grilled moose. Meanwhile, on his backhaul run from Prudhoe, Dave finds that his truck is losing power; the problem is that the engine is only drawing fuel from one of his two tanks. He pumps fuel from the bad tank to the good one by hand and reaches Fairbanks, only to be told that his behavior on the convoy run has landed him in trouble. Ordered off the road until the Carlile boss can meet with him later in the week, he fumes over the thought that he may be fired.
| 64 | 12 | "No More Mr. Nice Guy" | August 21, 2011 |
In Fairbanks, Lisa and Tony take steel building frames bound for Prudhoe; at 16 feet, Lisa's load is the widest of her career. The two truckers need a squad of pilot cars to help keep the road clear. That night, they maneuver carefully past several southbound convoys and trucks parked on both sides of the road, leaving little room for error. Lisa takes the lead the next day for the run over Atigun, and they reach Prudhoe that night; Tony expresses his satisfaction at her success on this run. Although Maya is sick, she reports in to get a load and heads for Prudhoe. She develops a fever that night, but successfully negotiates a slick, steep uphill climb. The next day, she encounters Phil and tries to pass him, but he jokingly keeps her from doing so. Impatient for something to do, Dave is dispatched to take a pickup-truckload of tires to a crew a few miles north of Fairbanks. He has several close calls with southbound trucks before making the delivery. In Manitoba, the approaching end of winter has made the roads slick and thinned the ice on river/lake crossings. Hugh and Rick head north from Winnipeg, with fuel tanks bound for Garden Hill; at a fuel station, they come across Alex, who is taking a load to St. Theresa Point. The three decide to convoy with a fourth driver for safety reasons, and find a wrecked truck and other signs of trouble caused by the deteriorating roads. Alex ends up at the back of the pack, but surprises the others by passing them during a roadside stop. After they ease across a lake and reach Garden Hill, Alex gives Hugh a present: a picture of Hugh's father in front of a cabin where his ashes are scattered.
| 65 | 13 | "Ice Rogue Trucker" | August 28, 2011 |
In Fairbanks, Dave picks up a load of pipes as part of Carlile's late-season drive to get urgently needed freight to Prudhoe. Told to stay close to Phil, he has trouble hooking up his trailer and finds that he may have dented one of the pipes. The load turns out to be undamaged, but Dave is cautioned to be more careful as he and Phil head out. Irritated, Dave ignores Phil's radio calls during the last stretch of the run, leaving Phil unimpressed with his attitude. Setting up to head north with a load of cable trays, Maya finds her trailer brakes stuck. Another trucker helps her fix the problem, but her brakes soon lock up again once she is on the road. Deciding to play it safe, she drops the load and returns to Fairbanks. After stopping with Tony to scatter a trucker's ashes on the Brooks Range, Lisa goes south with a load of recyclable materials and hears about Maya's trailer problems. The two discuss Dave's attitude as they head south, but a collision between a pickup truck and a big rig delays them for more than an hour. In Winnipeg, Alex has developed coughing fits and is worried that his lung trouble from three years earlier is returning. After a clinic visit, he is diagnosed with bronchitis and prescribed antibiotics. He picks up a load of groceries bound for St. Theresa Point and hurries out, anxious to deliver it before the road closes for the season. The slick road conditions and his fever complicate the trip, but he pushes on and stops briefly to observe a skunk. After fighting his illness and a stretch of treacherous lake that night, he brings the groceries in the next morning. Hugh and Rick both take their trucks in for maintenance before the final push. To keep himself busy, Hugh takes a dump truck loaded with 15 tons of boulders across Lake Winnipeg to Victoria Beach, 60 miles away. After easing across the wet, slushy lake ice, he brings in the load and returns to Winnipeg for another one. This time, he meets an oncoming truck on the lake crossing, a situation that puts both drivers at risk; they ease past each other and he delivers the boulders safely.
| 66 | 14 | "The Heat Is On" | September 4, 2011 |
In Prudhoe, Dave picks up a load and heads south. Phil, still watching his performance, has begun to think that Dave is ignoring safety rules in order to get more loads. Meanwhile, the truck Tony wrecked early in the season has been completely repaired, and he takes it up from Fairbanks with a load of diesel fuel. Once he delivers the tanker, he picks up a load of gasoline for Nuiqsut and skids badly on the slick river ice while bringing it in. As Lisa and Maya take loads north from Fairbanks, Maya is beginning to feel comfortable on the road. Stopping briefly to help a driver fix a coolant leak, they meet Tony in Coldfoot during his Prudhoe run and discuss Dave's behavior. Dave stops here, overhears some of their comments, and immediately leaves without Phil to keep himself from getting into a confrontation. He arrives in Fairbanks that night, an hour ahead of Phil; the next morning, his supervisors decide to take him off active duty until they can re-evaluate his driving. In Manitoba, Hugh and Rick take loads of fish to Winnipeg while Alex hauls road-maintenance chemicals toward Little Grand Rapids. Alex's load shifts on the trailer, breaking one of its pallets, but he brings it in and takes on a load of recyclables bound for Winnipeg. He comes to the site of a collision between a camera crew vehicle and a big rig; there are no injuries, and he moves on once the wreck is cleared.
| 67 | 15 | "Judgement Day" | September 18, 2011 |
Warming temperatures give rise to wet, slick road conditions, complicating the push to move the season's last loads. In Manitoba, Hugh and Rick get an early start to move loads up to St. Theresa Point - concrete barriers and school supplies, respectively. They stop to re-secure one barrier after it slides forward and nearly crushes Hugh's cab, then bring their loads in. Alex, taking building supplies to Garden Hill, finds dangerously thin ice on a lake crossing and detours around it, adding 200 miles to his trip. A broken drive shaft delays him until another driver brings up a replacement truck so he can continue the run. In Prudhoe, polar bear sightings on the road have temporarily blocked runs to and from the oil fields. Tony picks up a load of scrap metal and goes south, passing a northbound truck as he reaches the point where he had his accident at the start of the season. The bear later moves off the road and trucks start moving as a road crew works to relieve pressure on a frozen creek, so that the ice will not destroy its bridge. In Fairbanks, Dave is fired from Carlile and goes home after meeting with his supervisor to discuss his driving performance and behavior. Maya learns of his dismissal from Phil as she heads north with a fuel tank. Heading up Atigun without chains despite his caution about the bad road conditions, she slips on the ice but comes down safely after stopping near the peak for a southbound truck. Lisa is called in to move a shack as part of a heavy-haul convoy, but her truck's computer detects problems and cuts her engine power as a precaution. Pushing on through the bad road conditions and rush of southbound trucks near Atigun, she brings her load safely to Prudhoe.
| 68 | 16 | "The Last Dash" | September 25, 2011 |
In Fairbanks, Tony is not surprised to learn of Dave's dismissal. Heading north with a load of pipes, he ponders other drivers' reports of slick roads and passes a pickup truck in a ditch. In Prudhoe, Lisa and Maya are both dispatched to Nuiqsut with loads of assorted supplies and must deal with the slippery ice roads. The delivery puts Lisa at the top of the Alaska load count. Once all three are back in Fairbanks, the Carlile truckers get together for an end-of-season cookout. In Manitoba, Hugh has reached St. Theresa Point but finds no loads available that can fit on his trailer. He and Rick head back to Winnipeg empty-handed, but get stuck while trying to pass an abandoned double-wide truck in a storm. They have no success pulling loose until the driver returns with a second double-wide, providing enough traction to help move all the other trucks so Hugh and Rick can finish the trip. On the way to Garden Hill in his replacement truck, Alex stops briefly to pull a passenger car out of a ditch. He brings in his load and picks up a cargo of tools bound for Winnipeg; soon after starting back, though, he finds an antifreeze leak and must return to town. The problem is a broken radiator hose, and local mechanics splice in a new piece to get him back on the road. Completing this run puts Alex ahead of Hugh in the load count for the first time in five seasons. Final load count (Canada): Alex - 22; Hugh - 21; Rick - 20; Final load count (Alaska): Lisa - 28; Dave - 27; Tony - 25; Maya - 22
