= Fingering =

Fingering may refer to:

- Fingering (music), the positioning of the fingers when playing a musical instrument
- Fingering (sexual act), the use of fingers to provide sexual stimulation
- Fingering, a slang term for the identification of the subject of a criminal accusation
- Salt fingering, a mixing process that occurs when salty water overlies relatively colder, fresher water
- Viscous fingering, the formation of patterns in a morphologically unstable interface

== See also ==
- Finger (disambiguation)
- Finger numbering
- Finger-ring
- Fingerling (disambiguation)
