= Finger Lake =

Finger Lake may refer to:

- Finger lake, a narrow linear body of water occupying a glacially overdeepened valley
- Finger Lakes, New York, U.S.
- Finger Lakes AVA, wine region
- Finger Lake (Alaska), U.S.
- Finger Lake, Finger-Tatuk Provincial Park, British Columbia, Canada
