= Finger (surname) =

Finger is the surname of:

- Alan Finger (1909–1985), Australian medical practitioner and communist
- Bill Finger (1914–1974), American comic strip writer, co-creator of the Batman character
- Gottfried Finger (c. 1660–1730), Moravian Baroque composer and viol player
- Hans Michael Finger (1875–1964), German teacher and head of the district home office in Peine
- Harold Finger (born 1924), American aeronautical engineer
- Hauke Finger (born 1968), German politician
- Herman Finger (1856–1929), American-Canadian businessman
- Jeff Finger (born 1979), American hockey player
- Joseph Finger (1887–1953), Austrian-born American architect
- Julius Finger (1826–1894), Austrian ornithologist
- Peter Finger (born 1954), German guitarist, songwriter, and record producer
- Susan Finger, American engineer
