= Fingerling =

Fingerling or Fingerlings may refer to:

- Fingerling (fish), the development stage of young fish at which the fins can be extended and scales started developing
- Fingerlings (toy), line of robotic toys
- Fingerling potato, a small potato

== Fiction ==
- Pinkeltje, translated as "Fingerling", a finger-sized gnome character in 1939-1977 children's books by Dutch writer Dick Laan
  - Pinkeltje (film), a 1978 Dutch film based on the book series
- Detective Fingerling, a character in The Number 23

== Music ==
- Fingerlings (album), by Andrew Bird
- Winged Eel Fingerling, guitarist

== See also ==
- Fingering (disambiguation)
