= Finger lechi =

Scientific classification
- Kingdom: Animalia
- Phylum: Arthropoda
- Subphylum: Chelicerata
- Class: Arachnida
- Order: Araneae
- Infraorder: Araneomorphae
- Family: Salticidae
- Genus: Finger
- Species: F. lechi

Binomial name
- Finger lechi Wesołowska & Wiśniewski, 2023

Species of spider

Finger lechi is a species of jumping spider in the genus Finger that lives in Angola. It was first identified in 2023.
