= Ice Road Truckers season 3 =

Season of television series

Ice Road Truckers
- Season 3
- No. of episodes: 13

Release
- Original network: History
- Original release: May 31 – August 23, 2009

Season chronology
- ← Previous; Season 2 Next → Season 4

This is a list of Ice Road Truckers Season 3 episodes.

At the top of the world, there's a job only a few would dare. Last season, the dash for the cash was fought on the smooth playing field of Canada's Arctic ice. This season, two old pros join four of America's bravest truckers to tackle the tundra's deadliest ice passage. Just when you thought extreme trucking couldn't get more dangerous, ice road truckers take on Alaska. These are the men who make their living on thin ice.

— Thom Beers, opening of the show, season 3

Season 3 of Ice Road Truckers premiered on May 31, 2009 and covers the Dalton Highway, which connects Fairbanks, Alaska, Coldfoot, Alaska, and Deadhorse, Alaska near Prudhoe Bay, Alaska, as well as ice roads constructed over the Arctic Ocean in the Prudhoe Bay area. The Dalton Highway (Alaska Route 11) serves as the only road link between Alaska's populated areas down south and the oil rigs of the arctic north, to bring supplies nearly 500 mi (800 km) from Fairbanks to the Prudhoe Bay Oil Fields and offshore rigs. However, the combination of avalanches, strong Arctic winds leading to whiteouts, and unforgiving terrain has led to hundreds of accidents in the past years. Two thousand loads must be moved up the road within 12 weeks, before the ice melts on the Arctic Ocean. The tagline for the season is: "In the Dark Heart of Alaska, there's a road where hell has frozen over". In this season the 2009 Mount Redoubt eruptive activity caused complications; the truckers had to carry many loads which were intended for flight, but the planes could not fly because of volcanic ash in the air.

The season finale aired on August 23, 2009.

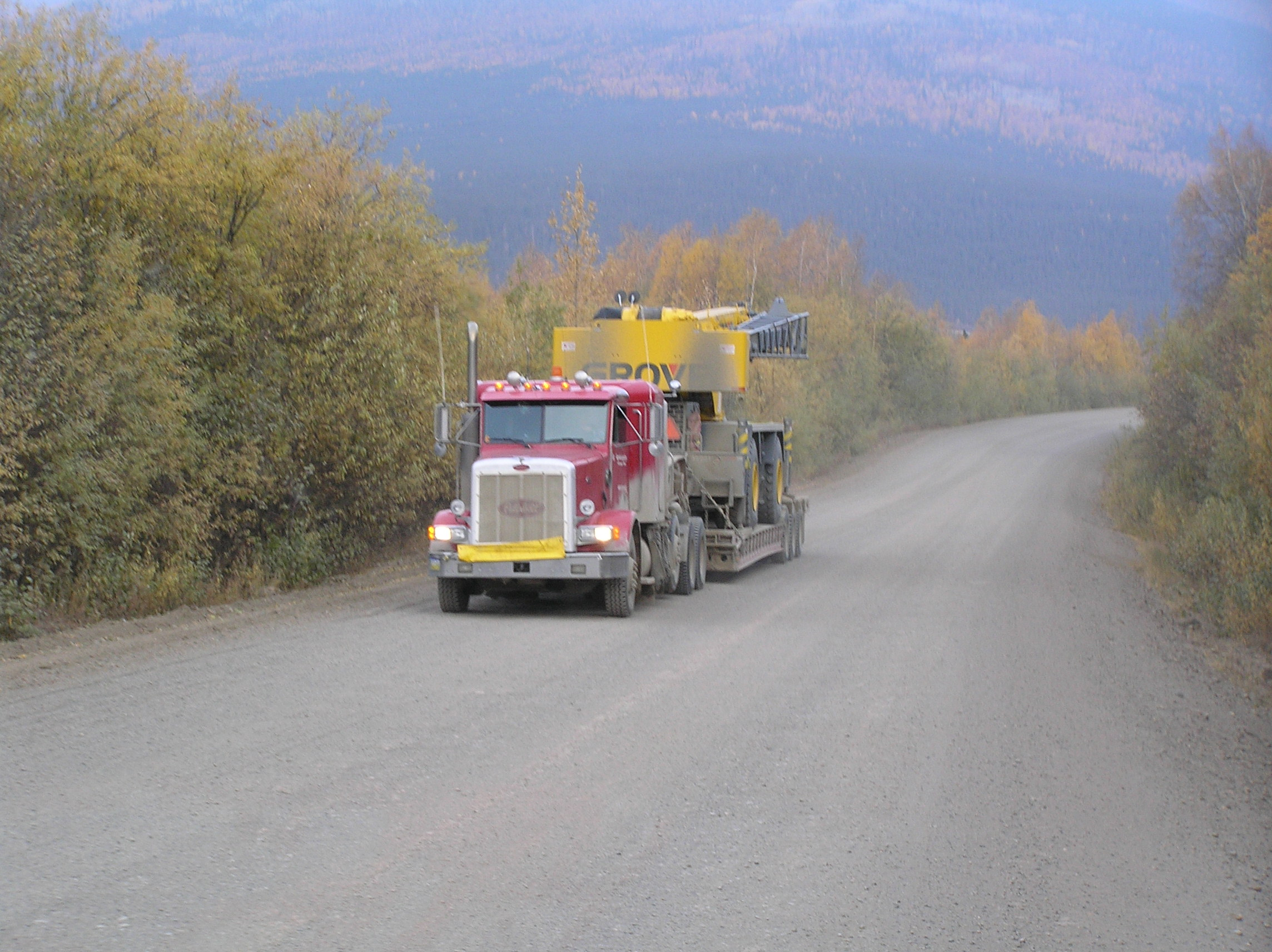
Truck traffic on the Dalton Highway in 2004.

== Drivers ==
Hugh Rowland and Alex Debogorski take part in this season as newcomers to the Dalton Highway in Alaska, working alongside the following local drivers at Carlile Transportation.

- Jack Jessee: A 38-year-old veteran driver and Virginia native, Jessee has 15 years of ice road trucking experience to his credit. He has earned a reputation as a "heavy hauler" who specializes in moving massive and/or oversized loads. In his introduction on the show's website, he offers this opinion about driving the Alaska roads: "You learn the road really fast… or you end up dead."
- George Spears: Spears, 59, is a respected veteran driver in Alaska. He has been driving the ice roads for 29 years and helping rookies get used to the hazards. In the season premiere, he remarks about an incident in which he flipped his own truck over a cliff one year. He intends to retire at the end of this season, his 30th.
- Lisa Kelly: A former school bus driver and state Freestyle Motocross champion, Kelly is starting her second year on the ice roads. At 28, she is the youngest female driver this year, and hopes to earn the veteran truckers’ respect and become Carlile's first female heavy hauler. In Season 4, the Wasilla resident stated that she had to sell the first horse she ever kept as a pet and was trying to earn enough money to buy it back, a goal she eventually accomplished.
- Tim Freeman Jr.: A 23-year-old ice road rookie from Blackduck, Minnesota, Freeman is a fourth-generation trucker with several years of over-the-road driving experience. Family friend George Spears has been helping him prepare for the challenge of driving Alaska's roads.
- Carey Hall: The son and grandson of truckers in his native Louisiana, Hall, a 45-year-old African American, is known on the Alaskan ice as "Big Daddy" and is universally respected for his professionalism. He appears in one episode, driving with Jessee to deliver a pair of enormous storage tanks.
- Phil Kromm: A 15-year veteran fuel-hauler from Alaska, Phil is also in charge of safety, recruitment, and driver training to get rookie drivers accustomed to the Dalton Highway (most notably Debogorski in Season 3, and Redmon and Sieber in Season 5). He is also Lane Keator's advisor on rookie progression. Despite his never being a main character in any of the future seasons, he plays a vital role in rookie training and has a hand in determining some of the rookies' being fired. (Fellow veteran driver Tony Molesky rides with Rowland on his first trip up the Dalton, and joined the cast in Season 5.)
- Jack McCahan: Veteran Carlile driver who serves as one of Debogorski's escorts until he gets fed up with Alex's "rookie s***" in that he takes so long to chain up his tires.

== Support personnel ==
- Lane Keator: Fairbanks Terminal Manager for Carlile. Among his responsibilities are making the final decisions on hiring, firing, promoting and demoting drivers.
- Tim Rickards: Fairbanks Dispatcher for Carlile. He assigns loads for the drivers.
- Jerid Lane: Mechanic at Carlile's Fairbanks repair shop. He keeps the trucks running.
- Roberta Klema: Driving instructor for Carlile Fairbanks. She puts new drivers through a driving simulator to familiarize them with the Kenworth tractors Carlile uses, as well as a preview of conditions they'll face when driving the Dalton.
- John McCoy: Driving instructor for Carlile Fairbanks. He gives physical road tests to new drivers behind the wheel of a typical Kenworth cab and trailer.
- Harry McDonald: Carlile CEO. In episode 1, he describes the challenge they face this season moving 2,000 loads to Prudhoe Bay in 60 days, and gives a very brief history of the company he co-founded with his brother in 1980 in episode 4.
- Greg Thompson: Carlile Heavy Haul Manager. In episode 2, he says that they need "the best of the best" drivers for hauling special loads like Jessee does, "because a lot of guys won’t do it, they’re afraid of it".
- Reid Bahnson: Alaska Department of Transportation & Public Facilities avalanche technician. He leads a crew that triggers avalanches so natural ones are less likely to impact truckers and freight on the Dalton. His weapon of choice is a Korean War-era recoilless rifle that shoots 8-lb TNT mortars into avalanche chutes.
- Donald Adkins: Grader operator for Alaska DoT&PF. He helps prepare and maintain the Dalton for the truckers, and helps pull out those who get stuck in snowdrifts.
- Ken Bear: Plow driver for Alaska DoT&PF. He is one of many who plow the Dalton after snowstorms and avalanches.
- Dan Schok: Project engineer for Flowline, supplier of the 34-inch-diameter 130-foot-long pipe being transported by Jessee in episode 2.
- Ben Kryzkowski: Owner of Ben's Towing. He has 25 years of experience removing wrecked trucks from the Dalton.
- Terrence Cole: Professor and Historian from the University of Alaska. He appears to describe the impact of oil discoveries and the construction of the Dalton and the pipeline.

== Route and destinations ==
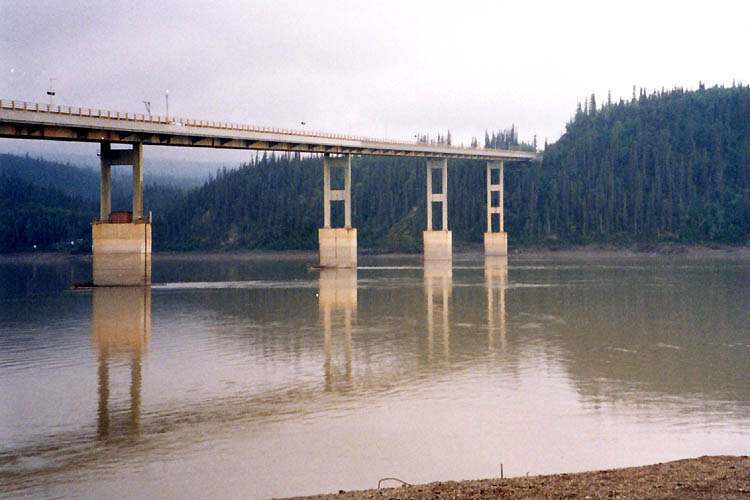
The E. L. Patton Yukon River Bridge carries the Dalton Highway over the Yukon River

Dalton Highway:

- Fairbanks, Alaska: Home of Carlile Transportation's Fairbanks terminal, the main trucking company featured in Seasons 3 and 4, and one of several featured in Seasons 5 and 6.
- Coldfoot, Alaska: Home of the only rest stop on the Dalton Highway, serving as a stopping point for truckers when bad weather closes the road and the only services on the Dalton between Fairbanks and Deadhorse.
- Deadhorse, Alaska: Home of Carlile's Prudhoe Bay terminal and the northern terminus of the Dalton Highway. Ice roads extend from here over the Arctic Ocean and adjoining rivers, allowing truckers to reach the offshore oil rigs in Prudhoe Bay as well as other communities to the west.

== Final load counts ==
- Jessee — 20
- Spears — 15
- Kelly — 15
- Rowland — 13
- Debogorski — 12
- Freeman — 11

== Episodes ==
No. overall	No. in season	Title	Original release date
24	1	"Deadliest Ice Road"	May 31, 2009
The Dalton Highway (Alaska Route 11) serves as a major ice road to bring supplies nearly 500 miles from Fairbanks to the Prudhoe Bay oil fields and offshore rigs. However, the combination of avalanches, strong Arctic winds leading to whiteouts, and unforgiving terrain has led to hundreds of accidents in past years. Six thousand loads must be moved up the road within 12 weeks before the ice melts. At Carlile Transportation in Fairbanks, "heavy hauler" Jack Jessee is assigned an oversized modular building unit to take to Prudhoe Bay. A squad of pilot cars accompanies him to warn other drivers of his approach, but he must still contend with the other road hazards on his own. Passing a spun-out truck, he nearly suffers the same fate; a recent avalanche and sudden whiteout close the road for some time, but he does meet his delivery deadline. Along the way, word comes in that a truck has gone off the road, but the driver (a rookie on his first run) was not seriously injured and made it back to town. Thirty-year veteran George Spears and rookie Tim Freeman, Jr. set out together for Prudhoe Bay, hauling steel housing panels and canned food, respectively. Shortly after the start of the run, Tim feels himself losing control of his truck, and he decides to abandon his load and return to Fairbanks so he can have the truck checked out. Soon afterward, though, he begins to wonder if he let his nerves get to him. Arriving in Fairbanks, Hugh and Alex report to the Carlile headquarters for an evaluation of their driving skills in the company's trucking simulator. Hugh passes, but barely; Alex gets off to a rough start, but quickly improves and earns a passing grade as well.
25	2	"Rookie Run"	June 9, 2009
Second-year driver Lisa Kelly takes a load of construction equipment, her first of the season, and sets out with the goal of reaching Deadhorse in one day. Pulling in 14 hours later, she must then negotiate the final stretch of the road over the Arctic Ocean in order to deliver her cargo to the oil fields where it is needed. Jack picks up the longest load of his career - a set of 130-foot-long pipes, which pose special difficulties in both loading and hauling. An inspection at a weigh station on the road reveals that the load is overweight and unbalanced, and he is fined $1,000 and sent back to Fairbanks to take care of these problems. The delay puts him one day behind when he heads north again. The Fairbanks mechanics check out Tim's truck but find nothing wrong, suggesting that his inexperience was the cause of the problems he encountered on his first run attempt. He and George go north, each with a load of construction supplies; this time, he is better able to navigate the road's hazards. The flipped truck seen in the previous episode contains a load of batteries, which must be salvaged to prevent damage to the environment; after a six-hour road closure, the truck is towed back to Fairbanks and the load goes to Deadhorse. Snow and wind slow Tim and George for a while, but they deliver their loads safely. Meanwhile in Fairbanks, Hugh and Alex undergo Carlile's week-long training program for new employees, including a drug test and a practice drive around Fairbanks, and are cleared to start making runs.
26	3	"Canadian Invasion"	June 14, 2009
Now back on the road after correcting his truck's weight problem, Jack finds a pickup truck in the ditch on a steep, slick hill. A risky maneuver allows him to tow the vehicle back onto the road, and he takes his load of pipes to Deadhorse and returns to Fairbanks for his next load, an oversized pipe rack. He loses three hours waiting for a spun-out truck to move, then finds himself in the middle of a fierce Arctic storm with no choice but to keep rolling. In Fairbanks, Lisa picks up a set of truck tires (her first oversize load) and finds that the combination of its bulk and steep, slick curves poses serious risks. As she approaches the edge of the storm, she stops to re-secure the load but is knocked over when one of the strap tensioners gives way; she then decides to wait at Coldfoot until the weather clears. Tim and George briefly lose track of each other in a blizzard, but are soon able to re-connect and keep heading north with fresh loads of construction supplies. Hugh and Alex start their first runs up the ice, hauling loads of pipes and accompanied by Carlile safety instructors. After Hugh ignores suggestions to watch his speed on the curves, his instructor (Tony Molesky) takes the wheel for the rest of the run. Alex, meanwhile, has trouble getting used to his truck's transmission; this difficulty and the brewing storm prompt his instructor (Phil Kromm) to drive instead. Both of them see a flipped truck as they go through the avalanche zone and reach Deadhorse.
27	4	"Blinding Whiteout"	June 21, 2009
Tim, George, and Lisa have gathered at Coldfoot to wait out the snowstorm, but Jack - the only driver on the road for the moment - pushes through it to cover the last 50 miles to Deadhorse. The weather begins to clear as he reaches town to deliver his pipe rack, but a second whiteout leaves him stuck in town for some time; after it breaks, he takes a load of 80-foot pipes out to an ocean oil rig. Lisa's pilot car breaks down, leaving her to negotiate the final stretches of snowy tundra alone at night, but she brings her load of truck tires to Deadhorse safely. Tim and George find that Atigun Pass, the highest-altitude stretch of the road, is down to one lane due to the storm, and they are 12 hours behind schedule when they deliver their loads. During their drives, all three spot trucks that have gone off the road and fallen victim to the harsh road and weather conditions. In Fairbanks, Hugh and Alex begin their first solo runs, delivering loads of pipes and driving behind Carlile veterans; Alex is delayed for some time by a broken trailer spring. Hugh nearly rear-ends his escort due to miscalculating his speed on slick downhill runs, but gets to Deadhorse safely. The delay in starting out leads Alex and his escort to stop at Coldfoot for the night.
28	5	"Accident Alley"	June 28, 2009
A storm has stranded several truckers at Coldfoot overnight, and Jack and Lisa go south the next morning even before the snowplows have had a chance to clear the road. Another truck has gone off the road in the bad weather; its driver was thrown free but managed to flag someone down, and he was subsequently airlifted back to Anchorage, Alaska for treatment. Lisa briefly loses her brakes and almost sideswipes a northbound truck, but she and Jack both reach Fairbanks to pick up their next loads. A recovery crew hurries in to get both the rolled truck and its load of pipes back to town without breaking a nearby natural gas line it had almost hit. Once Jack has his next load (a pipe rack), he sets out only to encounter moose on the road - one live, one dead that has to be hauled off the road by his pilot car driver. Hugh heads south from Deadhorse, hauling an empty trailer and joking about having his lightest load ever: a three-pound bundle of paperwork. He fights a sudden whiteout, strong winds that threaten to blow him into the ditch, and rough road patches caused by buckling of the frozen earth, and rolls on toward Fairbanks. Alex starts north again from Coldfoot, but stalls out on the icy mountain stretches as he did before. When he reaches Deadhorse, he discovers a flat tire on his truck and must wait for it to be fixed before he can go south again.
29	6	"Arctic Ice"	July 5, 2009
Lisa takes on her longest load ever, a set of 80-foot pipes meant for an ocean oil rig, in an effort to prove herself as a potential heavy hauler. She barely makes it out of Fairbanks ahead of the afternoon curfew for oversized loads, and must then work her way carefully along the road's turns and slopes due to the size of her trailer. After reaching Deadhorse at night, she covers the final stretch over the ocean the next day and delivers the pipes. Meanwhile, Tim's truck has broken down on the way back to Fairbanks; he left it by the road and got a ride, and now he and a mechanic are bringing up parts for a repair job. They get the truck working, but Tim discovers that someone has stolen his tire chains and he must drive to Fairbanks without them - skidding everywhere on the road as he goes. The truck is later found to have problems with its starter, and repairs take so long that George may have to start his next run without Tim. However, both men get rolling just in time, each hauling a load of petroleum products, then run into bad weather that night and stop at Coldfoot after learning that the road has been closed. In Fairbanks, Hugh and Alex each take on a load of pipes; Alex gets a head start on Hugh, who is delayed two hours after his escort gets into an accident. Alex successfully gets over the hill on which he stalled out in past runs, but at Coldfoot he finds that one of his tires has gone flat and peeled off its treads. With no spares on hand, he has to keep moving in order to stay on schedule, even though driving on the flat poses great risks even at low speed. Hugh passes him as a result and is the first to reach Deadhorse, with Alex arriving 35 miles behind.
30	7	"Wicked Weather"	July 12, 2009
As more storms close in on the area and the road crews race to minimize the danger of avalanches, Lisa picks up her next oversized load in Fairbanks: rig mats, a steel framework, and a pickup truck. Fresh snow buildup on the road makes the turns and slopes very slick, and as she reaches Coldfoot, she learns that the north lane has been closed due to the storm and must wait there for the night. Tim and George start out from Coldfoot, intent on getting through the mountains before the storm closes the road, and pass a wrecked truck in the ditch. They make it through Atigun Pass, but find themselves facing a 20-mile stretch of deep, fresh snowdrifts standing between them and Deadhorse; punching their way through, they deliver their loads safely. In Deadhorse, Hugh and Alex head south, hauling a load of toxic waste and an empty trailer, respectively. Hugh hits the fog at the edge of the storm and witnesses a near-collision between a northbound snowplow and a southbound trucker trying to overtake him. At the top of Atigun, he is delayed while waiting for a spun-out wreck to be towed off the road; he and his escort occupy themselves by setting up a camp stove and cooking dinner outside, then race toward Coldfoot. Alex reaches Atigun at night and must stop to chain his tires, but his slowness with the chains prompts his escort to leave him and he has to drive Atigun alone in a near-whiteout. He does clear the area and cover the remaining 70 miles to Coldfoot safely.
31	8	"Killer Pass"	July 19, 2009
Even though the Alaska Department of Transportation is working long hours to keep the road open, snowfall from the recent storms has made it very slick. In Fairbanks, Jack and fellow heavy hauler Carey Hall team up to transport a pair of huge storage tanks that must get to Deadhorse that night. Simply loading them up poses a challenge; they drop one tank in the process, but it is not damaged and they are able to head north. Encountering steep downhill runs and thick fog, and fighting fatigue on the last stretch, they bring the tanks in on time and then drive into a whiteout on the way back to Fairbanks. In Deadhorse, Lisa picks up some flatbed trailers to take to Fairbanks. As she goes through Atigun Pass, she encounters two northbound trucks (with the right of way) skidding all over the road and barely avoids going over the side as she lets them pass. Later in the day, she has to fight her way up a steep, icy slope before delivering her trailers to the Carlile yard. After looking over his truck in the Fairbanks garage, Alex gets a satisfactory mid-season evaluation of his driving performance, then picks up a load of construction supplies and sets off (with a new escort) for Deadhorse. In Coldfoot, he jokes about load counts with Hugh, who is going north with a light load of pipe fittings left there after the last storm. Alex gets through Atigun while a tanker with a heavy load passes him at a dangerous corner; Hugh decides not to chain his tires in this stretch, but is delayed by the crash of a tanker that did not use its chains. Both reach Deadhorse safely and Alex starts back with an empty trailer, while Hugh waits for his escort to get ready so he can bring back some flatbeds.
32	9	"Turn and Burn"	July 26, 2009
With only a few weeks left in the ice road season, the pressure is on to move critical supplies up to the oil fields. Tim and George continue to push south toward Fairbanks and pull in after four more hours of driving through whiteouts. As George waits for repairs on his truck, Tim gets a load of cable spools and prepares to ride in front, practice for eventually making solo runs. Once the two get on the road, Tim finds that his taillights are out and is unable to get them working; he is thus forced to return to Fairbanks, leaving George to go north alone. Jack and Lisa form a convoy of their own and start for Deadhorse, he with a three-tanker load of diesel fuel, she with some containers and rig mats. He shows her a new technique for shifting gears on the ice, but she has some trouble getting used to it and decides to practice it later. Lisa's taillights also malfunction, but an impromptu repair suggested by Jack allows her to continue on for the time being. They stop at Coldfoot for the night and find sheep on the road the next day before reaching Deadhorse and delivering their loads. A report comes in of an overturned tanker at the south end of the road, and recovery crews hurry to drain its fuel cargo and get the wreck off the road before traffic backs up. Meanwhile, as Hugh brings a cargo container south from Deadhorse, he stops for a truck weighing and log book inspection. The log is out of compliance, and he receives a citation with a $200 fine and a one-day suspension. Alex is momentarily stuck in Coldfoot, with a load of drill pipes and without an escort, but George soon arrives and offers to ride with him. The trip takes longer than Alex would like due George's relatively slow driving speed, and Alex nearly runs into a pickup truck that suddenly stops dead on the road for some time before starting off again. When the two drivers reach Deadhorse and unload, Alex is ready to start back right away, but George overrules him and says they will stay for the night.
33	10	"Ocean Run"	August 2, 2009
In Fairbanks, Jack gets an early start to haul a critical load of oil additive to a pipeline pumping station 250 miles up the road by noon. The liquid sloshes back and forth in its tanker, making it hard for him to stay in control on the slopes, and upon reaching the station, he has to adjust his suspension so that his truck will not tear up the unloading platform. The additive goes into the pipeline just in time and he heads south again. Lisa, Tim, and George set up a convoy - Lisa taking rig mats and a pickup truck to an ocean oil rig, Tim and George hauling Styrofoam insulation panels to Deadhorse. Lisa's preference for faster driving leads Tim and George to put her in front; she soon gets in trouble, stops dead on an uphill run, and has to restart from the bottom as trucks back up behind her. Once they reach Deadhorse, Tim and George unload and start back to Fairbanks, while Lisa crosses the ocean to deliver her cargo. Reaching Deadhorse, Alex picks up a loader and grinder bound for Fairbanks, but encounters buckled spots in the road which shake his trailer so badly that the straps on his load loosen and break. After tying it down again, he approaches the weigh station where Hugh was cited and stops to check his own log book and the height of his load. It is too tall to drive through town, so he decides to stay here until the next day and get a lower trailer. Hugh, in Coldfoot, picks up a load of drill pipe and makes a fast start north, but a slow-moving caribou in the road slows him down for a while. As he reaches Atigun Pass, his escort allows him to ride in front and send back warnings of oncoming traffic, after which he reaches Deadhorse safely.
34	11	"Busted Parts & Breakdowns"	August 9, 2009
With perhaps two weeks left in the season and 300 loads left to move, the truckers face a new challenge: the volcanic eruption of Mount Redoubt, which has grounded all air traffic and shut down Alaska's oil refineries. The Dalton Highway is left as the North Slope's only supply route for the time being. Jack prepares to take a load of badly needed diesel fuel from Fairbanks to Deadhorse, but he and a mechanic must first free a frozen axle on the trailer. The thawing road has become very rough and slippery; he barely clears a dangerous hairpin turn and an oncoming truck at the same time. Driving well into the night and battling fatigue, he brings the fuel into town safely. In Deadhorse, Lisa picks up some used batteries and an airline passenger who found herself stranded in town when the flights stopped running. She starts out for Fairbanks, but soon discovers a serious fuel leak and is forced to stop in an area out of radio contact. Several other truckers stop to help and get her rig running by changing out a broken fuel line. Though the cab is now full of nausea-inducing diesel fuel evaporation fumes due to the leak, Lisa completes her run to Fairbanks. Hugh and Alex are both briefly sidelined by mechanical problems. Hugh, in Fairbanks, must wait until his exhaust system is fixed before he can haul a load of pipes. In Deadhorse, Alex has to get a flat tire repaired, then has to drain the antifreeze from the disabled truck cab he must take to Fairbanks. As both approach Atigun Pass, Hugh struggles to chain his tires on the wet, muddy road, but Alex gets the job done much more quickly than in the past. Hugh's brakes fail on a steep downhill stretch, and he gets them to work just in time to avoid going over the cliffs. He delivers the pipes to Deadhorse, but finds no new loads waiting and must stay for the night. Alex loses engine power on a hill near Fairbanks; his escort finds a clogged air filter and does a rough repair job that allows him to make it into town.
35	12	"Race for the Finish"	August 29, 2009
A spring storm brings wind and snow, making the rapidly thawing road even more dangerous in the final days of the season. In Fairbanks, Lisa picks up a load of construction supplies, but a problem with the trailer's air brakes forces her to leave it and take a trailer full of explosives instead. Reaching the hill where she spun out two episodes ago, she tries a new strategy that allows her to climb it successfully; after clearing the windy Atigun Pass, she arrives in Deadhorse with her load intact. While hauling his empty fuel trailer back from Deadhorse, Jack loses traction on Atigun and is briefly stranded until a snowplow stops to tow him up to the summit. He has further trouble sliding on the bridge over the Yukon River, but gets to Fairbanks safely. Tim and George haul trailers of their own out of Deadhorse and push ahead so as not to get caught in the approaching storm. They reach Fairbanks the following day, and George believes that Tim is almost ready to start doing runs on his own. Alex, heading north toward Coldfoot with a load of pipes bound for Deadhorse, hears that his escort has an oil leak and stops to check it out. The truck has a broken line and cannot be driven, so they leave it by the road and stay in Coldfoot for the night. The next day, they replace the line and return to Coldfoot to wait out the storm with Hugh, who is taking construction supplies to Fairbanks. Each runs into challenges - snow and fog on Atigun for Alex, sleet and a slick, steep uphill run for Hugh - and makes it to his destination safely.
36	13	"Arctic Thaw"	August 23, 2009
The season finale; with two days left in the season, the truckers rush to take their last loads before the road disintegrates completely. Tim picks up a load of pipes and sets out from Fairbanks on his first solo run, while Lisa heads south from Deadhorse with a load of hazardous waste. Her trip becomes extremely dangerous due to an air leak that disables her trailer brakes. She and Tim meet in Coldfoot, and he stops the leak well enough for her to reach Fairbanks and close out the season. Tim crosses Atigun Pass, now dotted with patches of black ice, and finishes his run to Deadhorse. George and Alex head north with a load of construction supplies and three pickup trucks, respectively. George's slow pace continues to frustrate Alex, who still wants to get ahead of Hugh's load count, and George eventually lets Alex drive in front so he can complete his last run as soon as possible. Hugh develops major brake trouble on the way to Fairbanks, but he and his escort are able to patch up the truck and nurse it back to town for an overnight repair job. The next day, Hugh takes on construction supplies and is almost to Deadhorse before running into a traffic jam caused by trucks stuck in the snowdrifts. Once the backlog is cleared, he brings in his load and goes home with the respect of his superiors at Carlile for mastering the road's challenges in his first year on it. Upon reaching Deadhorse and delivering his load, George decides to end his ice road career, though other truckers wonder aloud if he is serious about that decision. Jack picks up a tanker of diesel fuel in Fairbanks and makes it as far as Coldfoot that day. The next morning, he continues north toward a remote island oil rig, only to be stopped by the presence of polar bears on the ocean ice road; they move off just in time for him to deliver the fuel and get off the road, the last driver to do so. Final load counts: Jack - 20; George - 15; Lisa - 15; Hugh - 13; Alex - 12; Tim - 11
