= Ice Road Truckers season 2 =

Season of television series

Ice Road Truckers
- Season 2
- No. of episodes: 13

Release
- Original network: History
- Original release: June 8 – September 7, 2008

Season chronology
- ← Previous; Season 1 Next → Season 3

This is a list of Ice Road Truckers Season 2 episodes.

At the top of the world, there's an outpost like no other…and a job only a few would dare. The ice men return: two titans of the southern ice roads, and two contenders. Last season they drove loaded semis on frozen lakes…this year, the Arctic Ocean. Deeper into the deep freeze. Further out on thinner ice. The new mission: to haul the heavy metal of natural gas drilling rigs up a frozen river and across ice-choked seas. Ice road truckers have come to the edge of the earth. These are the men who make their living on thin ice.

— Thom Beers, opening of the show, season 2

Season 2 premiered on June 8, 2008, following the drivers on the Tuktoyaktuk Winter Road, a 194 km (121 mi) extension of the Dempster Highway between Inuvik and Tuktoyaktuk in Canada's Northwest Territories. As the ice road from Inuvik to Tuktoyaktuk is completed, drivers converge on Inuvik for the start of the year's transport season. Debogorski, Rowland, Yemm, and Sherwood find themselves lumped in with the other "highway maggots" – the local drivers' term for rookies on this road – and must adapt to new rules and conditions. The road takes them up the Mackenzie River and over parts of the Arctic Ocean, visiting Aput and later Langley rigs with long stretches in which drivers are out of radio contact. The final regular episode premiered on September 7, 2008.

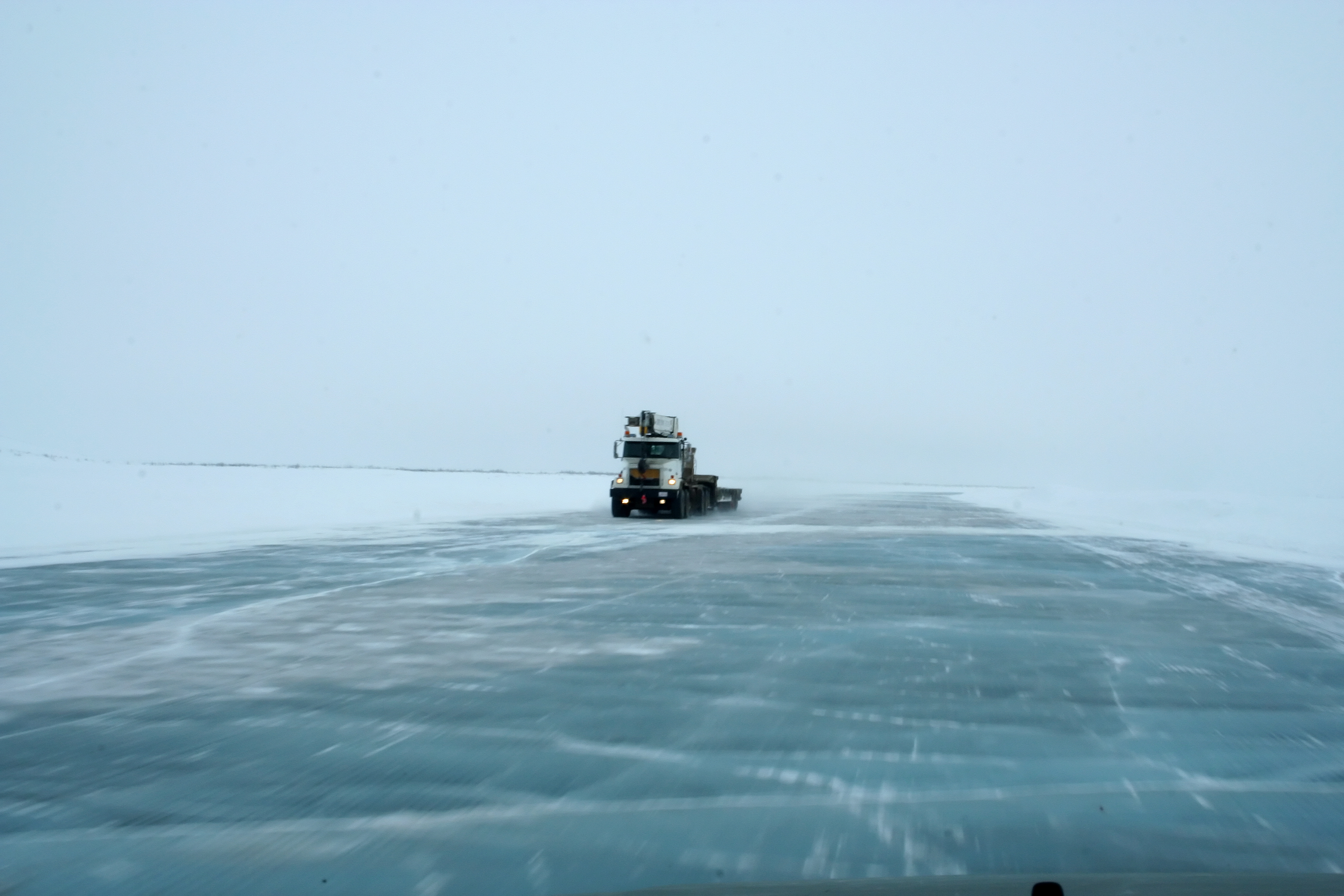
The Tuktoyaktuk Winter Road.

== Drivers ==
Debogorski, Rowland, Sherwood, and Yemm take part in this season as "highway maggots"—rookies on the ice road from Inuvik to Tuktoyaktuk. The following experienced truckers are also profiled.

- Eric Dufresne: A 46-year-old native of Montreal, now a resident of Faro, Yukon, with 26 years of experience on this ice road. As a result, he is often entrusted with loads that are heavy or hard to handle, such as a derrick in the season premiere. He also does much of his own maintenance and repair work, and is used to the cold weather, stating that he can be comfortable in a denim jacket even at −30 °F (−34 °C).
- Gerald "Bear" Swensen ✝: Born in Saskatchewan, Swensen is a 59-year-old resident of British Columbia and a six-year ice road veteran. He has worked most of his life as a truck driver in the logging industry, with some actual logging experience as well. When not working on the ice roads, he works as a professional bear hunting guide. Like Dufresne, he frequently pulls heavier-than-average loads. Swenson would die from complications of cancer on December 11, 2022, at the age of 74.

== Support personnel ==
- Jordan Fedosoff: The manager of Matco's Inuvik branch office, Fedosoff was born in Saskatchewan and raised between the fields of Saskatchewan and the city of Montreal. He began working in the trucking industry in 1981. He has driven and worked in Inuvik since 1995. He has vast experience in the Mackenzie Valley and the Dempster Highway. Sherwood worked for him in season 2.
- Doug Saunders: Saunders is the operations manager for E. Gruben's Transport, the company that hires Debogorski and Yemm. He considers Yemm to be one of his more "high-maintenance" drivers, in terms of Yemm's rough handling of the trucks and frequent complaints about the work environment.
- Shaun Lundrigan: The chief mechanic at the Gruben's freight yard in Tuktoyaktuk, he finds himself repairing Yemm's trucks several times during the season. As a result, his opinion of Yemm as a trucker steadily deteriorates from week to week.
- Jerry Dusdal: The "truck push" for Mullen Transportation, he takes responsibility for the truckers' safety and delivery of their loads. He states in the season premiere that he will never send someone else to do a job that he is not willing to do himself. When an entire drilling operation must be moved from one site to another, he deals with the logistics and equipment dismantling, as well as the delay caused by a winter storm that strikes the area.
- Davey Lennie: A foreman on the Northwind ice road construction crew, he looks after the trucks when the road is closed, and also stands ready to respond to any distress calls that come in. In the season premiere, he describes an incident from the previous year in which his truck broke through the ice. Oversized loads, such as a survival shack hauled by Dufresne, sometimes require his help to get from the edge of town to the freight yard. His cousin Isaac drives with Rowland to get some road experience before taking the written exam for his truck driver's license.
- Kelly Brown: A veteran driver in Inuvik, Kelly works for Matco Transportation, the second company that hires Sherwood shortly after the season begins. He rides with Sherwood on a training run to help him get used to driving the Arctic ice roads. Brown grew up in Montreal and began driving trucks in 1983; he has worked the ice roads since 1993.
- Devon Neff: A rookie driver on the ice roads who works for Mullen, Neff is called in to help move equipment off the Langley site late in the season. Due to the poor condition of the road at this time, he must contend with hazards such as breaks in the surface and water overflows from beneath the ice.

== Route and destinations ==
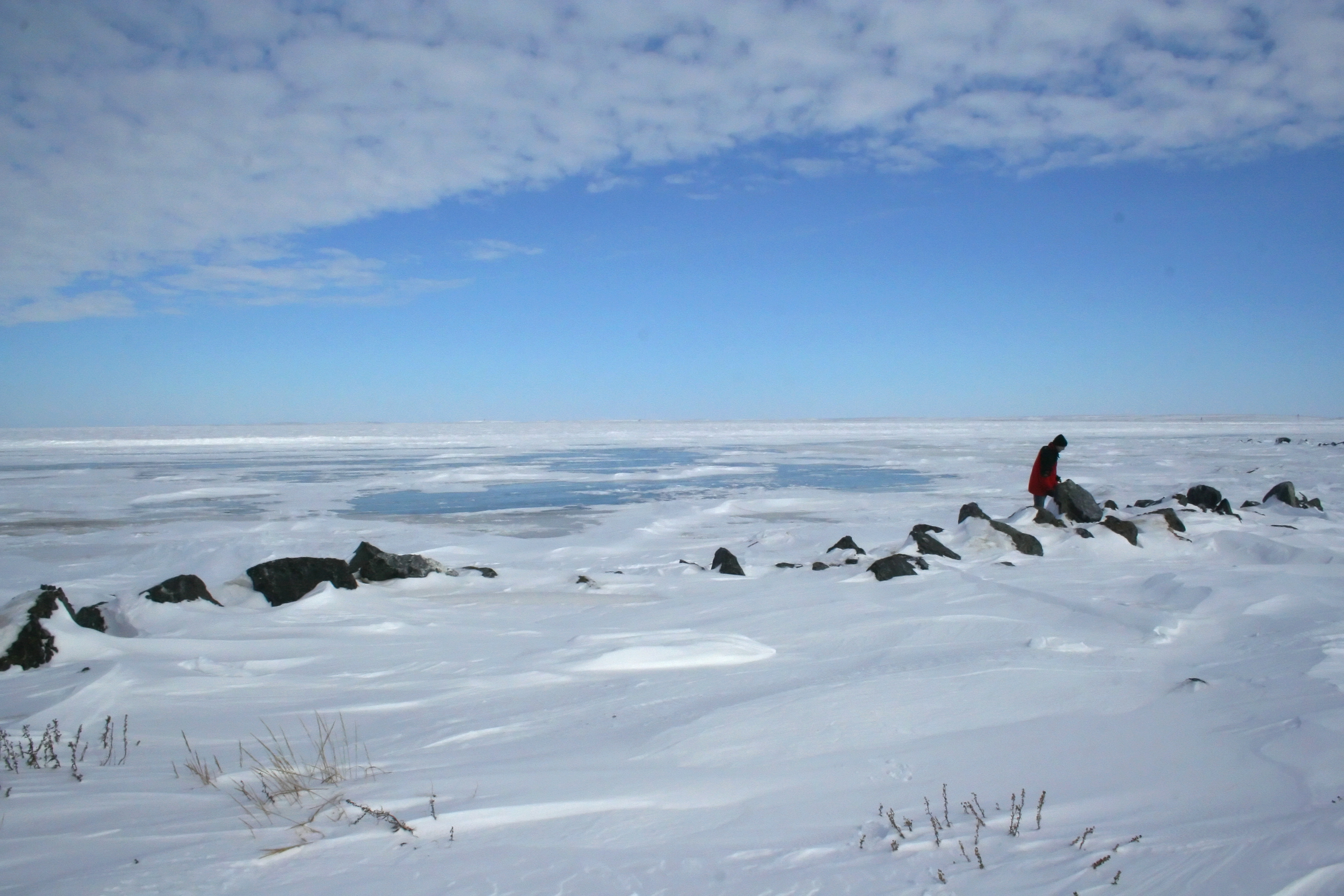
The Arctic Ocean at Tuktoyaktuk.

Tuktoyaktuk Winter Road

- Inuvik, Northwest Territories: Loads are assigned here to be transported north.
- Mallik: An exploration site that encompasses fields of natural gas hydrates. By the end of the season, the crews working here succeed in extracting gas from these formations.
- Aput: A natural gas exploration site set up by MGM Energy; later found to contain no significant deposits, whereupon the entire camp is moved 50 miles to Langley (see below).
- Langley: MGM's second and last exploration site of the year; proves to hold sizable deposits.
- Aklavik, Northwest Territories: A small hamlet, on the Mackenzie River delta, that depends on the ice road for delivery of needed supplies.
- Tuktoyaktuk, Northwest Territories: Loads (e.g. backhauls) are assigned here to be transported south.
- Wurmlinger and Arctic Star : Two ice-locked barges that serve as headquarters for crews in the field. In the summer the Wurmlinger carries goods around.

== Final load counts ==
- Sherwood — 9; spent most of the season driving on pavement in Inuvik.
- Debogorski — 22, as stated in "A Trucker's Farewell"; left early for medical reasons.
- Yemm — 51; fired on the last day of the season.
- Swensen — 63; hauled a total of over 4 million pounds, probably the most of any driver this season.
- Dufresne — 67
- Rowland — 68

== Episodes ==
No. overall	No. in season	Title	Original release date
11	1	"Edge of the Earth"	June 8, 2008
As the ice road from Inuvik to Tuktoyaktuk is completed, drivers converge on Inuvik for the start of the year's transport season. Alex, Hugh, Rick, and Drew find themselves lumped in with the other "highway maggots" - the local drivers' term for rookies on this road - and must adapt to new rules and conditions. The road takes them up the Mackenzie River and over parts of the Arctic Ocean, with long stretches in which drivers are out of radio contact. Alex is delayed by the late arrival of Rick, who gets into an accident on his way up the Dempster Highway while bringing a truck to Alex. They are both dispatched to Mallik, a site of ongoing research into gas hydrate fields. As they take their first loads out (a boiler house and a drilling mud tank), Alex gets used to this ice road's higher speed limits (50 km/h or 31 mph and up), while Rick keeps driving at 25 kilometres per hour (16 mph) as he did in Yellowknife. Eric Dufresne, a 26-year veteran of the road, is unable to start work right away because his truck needs transmission fluid and he must wait for the repair shop's supply to thaw out. His load (a shelter building) instead goes to Hugh, who makes his first delivery to Mallik while coping with malfunctioning brakes. Once Eric gets his truck back in service, he transports a derrick to the site. Meanwhile, Drew's departure is repeatedly delayed - first because he did not bring the proper cold-weather gear, then because there are no working trucks available. He ultimately quits without taking a single load onto the ice, but soon he is wondering aloud if that decision was a mistake.
12	2	"Mechanical Mayhem"	June 15, 2008
Word of Drew’s quitting spreads rapidly among the other truckers, but instead of going home, he finds work at a local moving company - driving a forklift at first, then a box truck. Eric is assigned the job of hauling a much-needed vacuum truck to Mallik; emergency repairs on its suspension and a frozen bolt threaten to ruin this plan, but he does eventually leave in time. Hugh takes a boiler to Mallik as Rick returns to Inuvik with a load of classified equipment from a Cold War-era military post. Six-year veteran Bear Swensen takes a load of rig mats to Mallik as Alex hauls a load to Tuktoyaktuk. On the way back to Inuvik, transporting contaminated soil, Alex spots emergency personnel attending to a flipped-over box truck whose driver is nowhere in sight. (Word later comes that this person made it back to Inuvik safely, while the truck is towed in.) Both Drew and Rick become ill; Drew calls in sick while Rick keeps driving. The ice-locked barge Wurmlinger, a base for ice road crews and research work, needs a vacuum tanker to offload its wastewater. Called on to repair a mothballed rig in the freight yard, Hugh gets it running after a night’s work and takes it up. Meanwhile, Rick suddenly stops on the ice road while taking some truck parts to Tuktoyaktuk. The problem is revealed to be a loss of engine oil, caused by hitting a bump that tore the oil pan open. He explains to Bear that the structure of his truck leaves the pan vulnerable to accidents such as this. The hole cannot be repaired, according to Tuktoyaktuk mechanic Shaun Lundrigan, and Rick will have to wait for a new pan to be flown in before he can get back to work.
13	3	"The Big Blizzard"	June 22, 2008
As the season’s first major blizzard closes in on the region, drivers scramble to deliver their loads before the ice road becomes impassable. With the help of a student trucker, Hugh takes his refurbished vacuum tanker to Aput, a natural gas exploration site, to haul away a load of wastewater. Drew makes his first ice road run of the year, bound for Tuktoyaktuk with a load of construction materials for a hockey rink, but his illness flares up and Kelly Brown (the senior trucker riding with him) has to finish the run. Rick is still off the road, waiting for a new oil pan to be flown in, as Bear hauls a drilling mud tank to Mallik. A snowplow gets stuck on the ice, but a repair crew quickly takes care of it. In Tuktoyaktuk, Alex discovers a flat tire (low on air) and must reinflate it quickly so he can drive to Aput for his next load – a pump house that must be taken back to Tuktoyaktuk. However, its size and weight force him to drive at low speeds as the storm moves closer. He is still on the road when the call comes in to close it, and he reaches his destination with minutes to spare before visibility drops to zero. In Inuvik, crew foreman Davey Lennie looks after the fleet and responds to a call of a truck that has run into a ditch, digging it out so it can be driven safely back. Trucking company owner Kurt Wainman assists by patrolling the area to watch for any other stranded vehicles. Once the storm breaks, the snowplows get to work clearing the road; as soon as they finish, Hugh is first to move out, taking the vacuum tanker back to Aput and spotting a pickup truck abandoned in the drifts. Rick borrows a truck to haul a load of industrial waste to Inuvik, but has to stop on the still-rough road to re-secure the cargo, as Drew is again out sick.
14	4	"Arctic Whiteout"	June 29, 2008
The gas drilling wells at Aput have come up dry , so the entire operation is to be shut down and moved 50 miles (80 km) to a new site at Langley. Nearly seven million pounds of equipment must be hauled along the ice road as quickly as possible, in order to keep the company from losing any more money than necessary. Eric hauls a heat exchanger and a generator for the new site’s truck shop, while Hugh brings a load of rig mats up from Inuvik and later takes his vacuum tanker to Aput. Meanwhile, Alex takes a water tank and some boards from Inuvik to Tuktoyaktuk and Drew completes his first solo run over the ocean, hauling groceries to the same destination. Rick is once again off the ice, waiting on both an oil pan for his original truck and assorted repairs to the one he borrowed; Shaun and the other mechanics blame these problems on his rough handling of the trucks. Once Eric has unloaded his cargo at Langley, he picks up a survival shack bound for Inuvik. When he reaches the edge of town at nightfall, though, he finds that the load will not fit underneath the power lines, so he finds a safe spot to park and spends the night in his truck. The next morning, he and Davey unload the shack and deliver it to the freight yard. In Aput, the truck shop and an expensive derrick drive unit are taken to Langley in one trip, after which the 135-foot (41 m) derrick itself is pulled down and prepared for transport. The weather begins to worsen as a storm closes in on the area, and supervisor Jerry Dusdal has a discussion with the senior truckers concerning the safety of both loads and personnel. Ultimately, the move is called off for the day and the road from Aput to Langley is closed until the storm passes.
15	5	"Lost on the Ice"	July 6, 2008
With the storm over and the road cleared and reopened, the truckers are ready to get back to work hauling equipment from Aput to Langley. To save time, rather than break the derrick down into pieces, Jerry loads the entire unit onto two trucks, hooked back to back with the derrick's ends resting on their trailers. Oncoming traffic is warned to yield the right of way to these two truckers; one convoy barely gets off the road in time, but the derrick still arrives safely. Eric hauls a cherry picker to the new site, once he and a supervisor get its frozen engine running again so he can drive it onto his trailer. Bear picks up an electric power station and carefully drives it to Langley due to its weight distribution. In Inuvik, Drew spends the day driving a box truck around town and a forklift at his employer’s loading dock, but he gets the latter’s wheels stuck in a rut and calls for Kelly to pull him out. Meanwhile, Hugh finds himself without a load since the senior truckers have taken them all for the moment; he is put onto miscellaneous work in the freight yard. In Tuktoyaktuk, Rick has begun to believe that load supervisor Doug Saunders and the other truckers are singling him out to treat him disrespectfully, and he calls Hugh for advice before getting word that his borrowed truck has been repaired. He takes a load of garbage to Inuvik but is not happy about it, refusing to get out of his truck and help clear a problem with the dumping. Alex is dispatched from Inuvik to Aput, a route unfamiliar to him, and he takes a wrong turn without realizing it. Long after nightfall, six hours overdue, he finally discovers his mistake and backtracks to Aput.
16	6	"Hundred Ton Haul"	July 13, 2008
Even though the derrick has been successfully moved from Aput to Langley, the crews cannot erect it until its 80-ton substructure is put in place. This equipment is split into two 40-ton loads and assigned to Alex and Bear. Alex has been battling problems with his health – hemorrhoids, shortness of breath, general fatigue – and Jerry holds him back for a while, sending Bear out first. The two loaded trucks have a combined weight of over 100 tons; Alex's load is the heaviest of his career. Both truckers stay below 25 km/h to avoid over-stressing the ice, and once they reach Langley, they must maneuver very carefully in order to unload the substructure halves in exactly the right position. Alex's half gets briefly tangled in the lines of one of the auxiliary trucks helping with the operation, but it is set down safely and the derrick goes up. Returning to Aput late in the day, he picks up a load of rig mats and crates, but Jerry keeps him there for the night out of concern for his welfare. Eric begins his day driving to Aput, ready to work on the rig move, but he is diverted to pick up a broken-down bulldozer stuck on the ice; the bulldozer can move slowly but not powerfully enough to do work. With the help of nearby mechanics, he loads it onto his trailer, drives it to the Wurmlinger for repairs, then heads for Aput again. Both Hugh and Rick draw waste-hauling jobs; Hugh takes his vacuum tanker up from Inuvik to offload sewage at Langley, while Rick brings another load of garbage from Tuktoyaktuk to Inuvik. After Rick finishes his round trip, he pays a visit to his company’s safety officer and voices his frustrations about the perceived lack of respect from Doug and his coworkers.
17	7	"Man Down"	July 20, 2008
As the rig move enters its third day, there are still many loads to haul from Aput to Langley. While pulling a gas flare stack, Eric hears of a polar bear sighting near the road and makes plans to stay clear of the area, since several people have died in bear attacks over the years. The news quickly spreads among the truckers, and local wildlife experts equipped with snowmobiles and rifles are dispatched to ward off the threat. Bear takes a boiler onto the ice road, whose surface is now so rough that he makes a risky stop to check that his load is secure before proceeding to Langley. In Tuktoyaktuk, Rick is scheduled to make a run to Fort Nelson, British Columbia – a five-day round trip, most of it on highways. Making it clear that he would rather quit, he is reassigned to haul garbage to Inuvik; before he can leave, though, his truck’s alternator has to be replaced. Once he has dumped the load, he stops at a bar in Inuvik and voices his displeasure to other truckers. Hugh takes his vacuum tanker from Inuvik to Langley for another sewage haul-away, during which he is surprised to learn of Alex’s deteriorating health. Alex has taken some pipes and a storage container from Aput to Langley, but his breathing has gotten worse and he is now suffering from severe coughing fits that sometimes bring up blood. After delivering the load and driving to Inuvik in preparation the next one, he checks himself into the hospital and is diagnosed with a possible pulmonary embolism. In order to confirm this, he must be flown to Yellowknife for a CT scan. Alex calls his wife to break the news and gets a visit from Hugh before boarding the plane.
18	8	"A Trucker's Farewell"	July 27, 2008
With only a few loads left in the rig move, the pressure is on Jerry to finish the whole operation by the end of the day. He sends Eric out with a drilling mud pump and gives the last load to Bear—a tank for isolating and measuring the gas brought up from the drilling wells. Both truckers have to handle their loads carefully, and Eric’s low speed briefly causes a traffic jam that puts extra stress on the road. Once Bear pulls in at Langley, the rig move is complete and the crews hurry to get all the equipment assembled so they can start drilling. Elsewhere, Hugh takes his vacuum tanker from Inuvik to Langley so he can drain the sewage tank again, while Rick hauls garbage from Tuktoyaktuk to Inuvik. Hugh has to be careful on the return trip; the battered road is becoming slippery due to the lengthening days, and the liquid in his tanker threatens to slosh around and cause him to lose control of the truck. Rick complains about both his truck’s condition and his own aches and pains, planning to see a chiropractor in Inuvik even though Doug wants him back in Tuktoyaktuk that night. He instead returns to the freight yard, intent on confronting Doug, and is surprised to be given time off for a checkup. In Yellowknife, Alex’s wife visits him in the hospital, accompanied by his priest and two of the couple’s sons, to pray for his recovery. His test results show a blood clot in his left lung, as well as evidence that he may have had a clot in his right lung that has broken loose. Warned that he could have a heart attack if he goes back to work, Alex reluctantly decides to end his ice road season early.
19	9	"A Rookie Fumbles"	August 3, 2008
The time has come to dismantle the Mallik site, even as crews are close to a breakthrough on harnessing the region’s gas hydrate fields. When springtime comes, there must be no traces of any human presence on the site. Eric picks up a camp shack bound for Inuvik, with the goal of completing two hauls in one day. In Tuktoyaktuk, Rick and second-year trucker Bill Thorbourne are sent to Mallik together. Bill’s truck soon develops problems with its heater, and the two men have to nurse their trucks along so he does not suffer hypothermia or frostbite. Upon reaching the site, Rick picks up a load of dirty snow and Bill takes on an electrical generator and three lighting plants. They reach Tuktoyaktuk safely; before Rick can clock out for the night, though, he is put on loader duty and must unload Bill’s cargo. At Mallik, the crews succeed in extracting natural gas from the fields. Elsewhere, Drew makes a run from Inuvik to the hamlet of Aklavik to deliver groceries. He briefly loses traction on the slick ice when his wheels lock up, but he is able to regain control with some careful maneuvering. Rookie Mike Flynn takes a load of diesel fuel from Tuktoyaktuk to Mallik and has to deal with his own road hazards along the way. Hugh and another rookie, Davey's cousin Isaac Lennie, set out from Inuvik for the Wurmlinger, taking the vacuum tanker to drain the wastewater tank. As he tries his hand at driving an ice road truck, Isaac has a rough beginning but soon improves under Hugh’s encouragement. Eric transports two shacks to Inuvik by day’s end, topping Hugh’s load count. Hugh, Rick, Bear, and Drew gather in the local bar to talk about Alex's absence, and Hugh calls him in the Yellowknife hospital to get the latest news. Alex tells everyone that he is off the ice for the rest of the season and will probably be out of work for at least six months. The next morning, Isaac takes the written exam for his truck driver’s license but does not pass – a failure Hugh takes personally.
20	10	"Highway Maggots"	August 10, 2008
With less than two weeks to go in the season, the ice road is badly worn and getting thinner by the day, and every available trucker is called in to move loads. Eric and Hugh drive up from Inuvik, the former headed for the Wurmlinger to pick up a load of drill casings, the latter to Langley with his vacuum tanker to pump out the wastewater. As they return to Inuvik, Kurt climbs into an available truck and drives up to help in the effort, hauling back a snowcat and a survival shack used by the road crews. At the ice-locked Arctic Star barge, a headquarters for natural gas exploration crews, veteran trucker Jim Gattie picks up a three-trailer load to save time: two pairs of full fuel tanks and related supplies, all on sleigh runners. The strategy makes his drive especially hazardous, but he reaches the edge of Inuvik safely and stops to unload the sleighs so they can be dragged in one by one. In Tuktoyaktuk, Rick starts out for Mallik to collect a load of dirty snow. Bill heads for Langley with a generator whose fuel tank begins to leak onto the ice, forcing him to turn around; Rick doubles back and helps plug the hole so that the environment will not be further damaged. As Bill goes to the shop, Rick speeds to Mallik in order to make up for lost time. He picks up the snow and dumps it in Tuktoyaktuk, but shortly into his second run, he hits a bump that damages his truck's hydraulics. The incident puts him back in the shop, fuming over this turn of events. Meanwhile, Bear is sent to help a snowplow truck that has broken through the ice, but another trucker takes care of the emergency even before he can get moving. A convoy of gravel trucks comes north — temporary southern drivers, unfamiliar with the ice roads, who have to be escorted to Aput so they can haul off drilling debris. Kurt makes his disdain for these drivers quite clear as they pass him and take their loads down toward Fort Nelson. At Langley, the crews’ testing confirms the presence of a sizable natural gas deposit.
21	11	"Man vs. Ice"	August 17, 2008
Now that natural gas deposits have been found at Langley, the top priority is to cap the well and move all the equipment out before the ice melts. However, the truckers must contend with both the thinning road and the water that has begun to flow up through the cracks. Rookie Devon Neff, making his first ice road run, and Hugh are dispatched from Inuvik to help with the job. Hugh picks up a load of rig mats and several large spools of cable, an unstable load whose weight distribution makes it difficult for him to keep traction on the wet, slick road. Meanwhile, just after Devon takes on two diesel fuel tanks and starts back, he is alerted to a severe water flow on the road directly ahead of him; he stops to re-secure his load, then proceeds slowly through the hazard. He and Hugh both make it back to Inuvik safely. Elsewhere, Bear and Eric each pick up a camp shack and haul them back to Inuvik – Bear’s from the Arctic Star, Eric’s from Langley. Just outside town, Rick gets the most expensive load of his season, a million-dollar off-road vehicle that must be taken 30 miles up the road to the 2D natural gas exploration site. Once he returns to Tuktoyaktuk, his truck has to go into the shop for repairs, idling him for the rest of the day; after he tells Doug about the problem and leaves, Doug expresses his displeasure at Rick’s rough driving and truck-handling habits. At Langley, Jerry coordinates the dismantling of the derrick and its associated equipment as Hugh brings his vacuum tanker up to offload the wastewater, completing two runs in one day and tying Eric for the lead in the load count.
22	12	"The Big Thaw"	August 24, 2008
As daily temperatures continue to rise and the ice road keeps melting, Jerry works at full speed to clear all the equipment from the Langley site. Every available trucker reports in for the job, including Devon and Hugh; the former gets a camp shack, the latter a load of crates and pallets, and both start out for Inuvik. The site’s derrick is loaded onto two trucks, just as in the move from Aput, but the drivers encounter a serious break in the road and must wait for a pilot car to escort them around the hazard. They reach Inuvik safely, as does Devon, who runs across some severe overflows of his own. Eric and Hugh are still battling for the highest load count. While Hugh hauls his load at full speed, Eric has taken one half of the Langley derrick’s substructure, whose 40-ton weight forces him to stay below 15 mph. Meanwhile, Bear picks up two large tanks whose weight and physical size pose a threat to both the road and his own safety. Reaching the outskirts of Inuvik, he loses traction and has to be pulled up the last hill, after which the tanks are unloaded so that they can fit under the power lines. Rick hauls a load of dirty snow from Mallik to Tuktoyaktuk, speeding ahead even though the rough road makes driving difficult. By the time Hugh and Eric finish for the day, they are once again tied for the most loads.
23	13	"The World Crumbles"	September 7, 2008
On the final day of the season, there are still hundreds of tons of equipment to move within 12 hours. However, the road is now awash in water and literally crumbling away beneath the truckers’ wheels. In Inuvik, Rick seizes a chance to take one last load, a loader that is to be stored at Tuktoyaktuk until next year. Since he does not know how to run a winch, he builds an improvised ramp out of boards and tries to drive the loader up it and onto his trailer, without success. Rick’s supervisor, irritated by what he sees as Rick’s season-long lack of professionalism, fires him and threatens to have him arrested if he shows up again. The incident ends up with the supervisor swinging one of the boards at the cameraman filming the scene - narrowly missing him. At Langley, Bear picks up a camp shack and takes it to Inuvik as his last load. Drew delivers a load of groceries and a couch to Aklavik, then heads home for the year, while Devon brings a camp shack back to Inuvik. He leaves with a measure of respect from the senior truckers for successfully navigating the late-season hazards. The rivalry between Hugh and Eric continues as both roll toward Langley. Eric is slowed down by a surprise whiteout and a lull in the action on site, but eventually picks up some rig mats and storage containers and heads back to Inuvik. Meanwhile, Hugh brings his vacuum tanker up to offload some wastewater; once he has emptied the load in Inuvik, he sets out again to drain the last full tank. Both he and Eric had planned to pull two loads today, but the road is officially closed before Eric can pick up his second, leaving Hugh at the top of the load count. Jerry confirms that Langley is completely clear and clean, and Hugh — the last driver to come in off the road — goes home with Kurt’s respect for a season of hard work. Final load counts: Drew — 9; spent most of the season driving on pavement in Inuvik.; Alex — 22, as stated in "A Trucker's Farewell"; left early for medical reasons.; Rick — 51; fired on the last day of the season.; Bear — 63; hauled a total of over 4 million pounds, probably the most of any driver this season.; Eric — 67; Hugh — 68

=== Special ===
A special titled "Off the Ice" premiered on September 21, 2008. This episode provides a look back at the events of the season, with additional commentary from the truckers and support personnel. Topics covered include:

- Development of Canada's ice roads in general, and of commerce along the Tuktoyaktuk Winter Road in particular
- Building the road and outfitting trucks to drive along it
- The truckers' personal motivations for working in the Arctic and comparisons between there and Yellowknife
- Each group's opinions about the other (northern and southern drivers)
- Truckers' comments about key events of the season: Sherwood quitting after one day, Debogorski leaving due to health problems, Yemm's personnel disagreements and firing, Rowland hauling sewage for most of his runs.
