= Fingerpointing =

Fingerpointing may refer to:

- an idiom for blame
- Fingerpointing (album), a 2008 album by Red Krayola
