= Julius Finger =

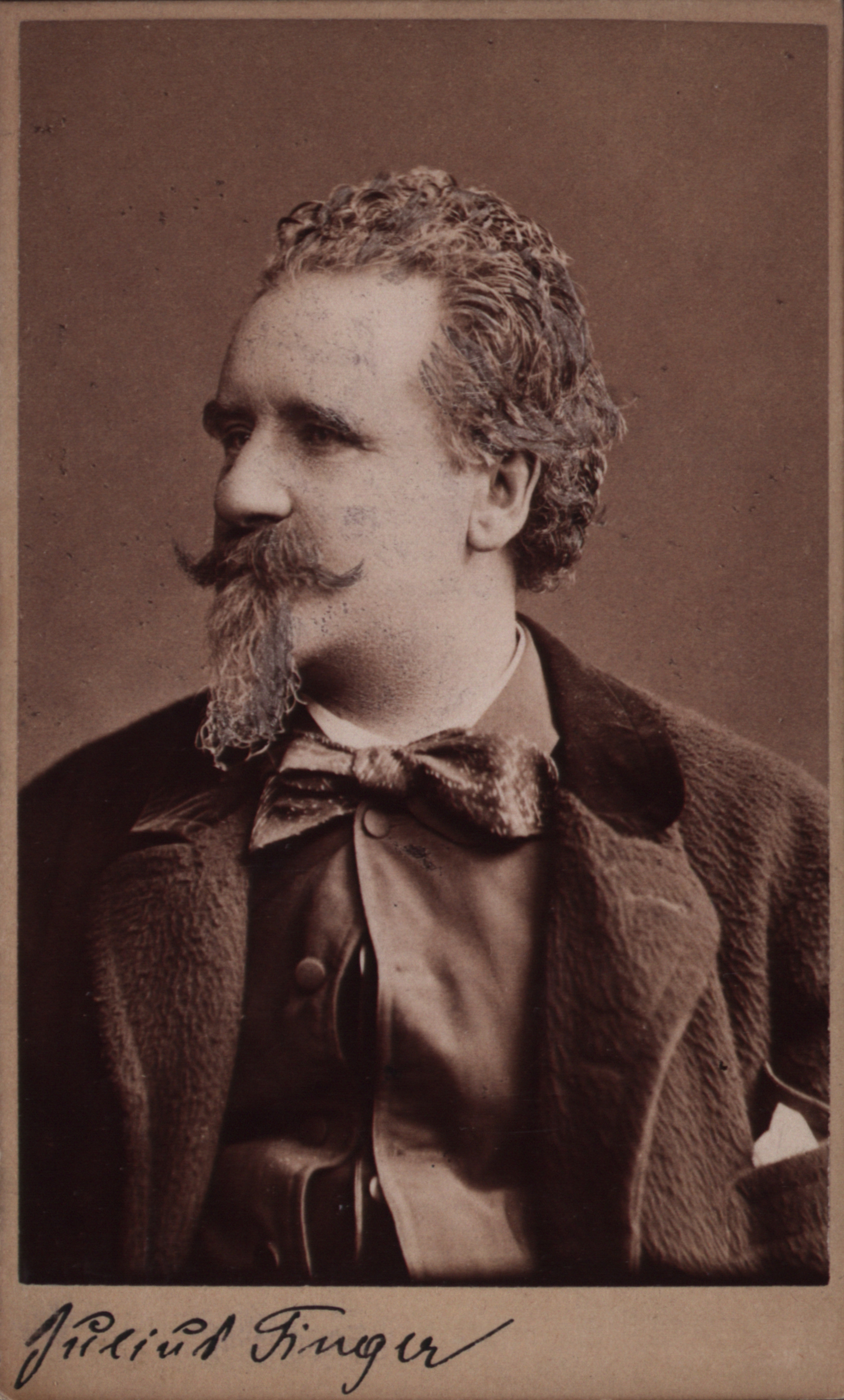

Julius Finger (June 30, 1826 – December 19, 1894) was an Austrian naturalist and specimen collector who contributed to bird study in the region. He was a skilled taxidermist and held a large private collection of bird specimens which he bequeathed to the museum of natural history in Vienna.

Finger was born in the family of a wealthy factory owner in Unter-Meidling in Vienna. He was educated at the local gymnasium and went to work as an accountant at the first Vienna savings bank until 1887. The expansion and industrialization of the city made him leave Füchselhof and build himself a villa around the lake in Millstatt known as the "Villa im Bärenfelde". A skilled taxidermist, he spent most of his time on ornithological studies and bird collections. His collections of 483 specimens (of 282 species) was donated by him to the museum in Vienna in 1876. At the new villa that he built around 1878 he once again began to collect ornithology specimens from around Austria and study birds. He collaborated with other ornithologists in the region and was one of the founders of the Vienna Ornithological Society in 1876.
