= Fingers (game) =

Drinking game

- A fingers game
- Alternative names: Fish fingers, finger blaster, finger it, finger bang, the finger game, finger spoof, finger pat, scoff, udta (Punjab), king's cup (Canada)
- Type: Drinking
- Players: 2+
- Play: Clockwise
- Playing time: 2-10 minutes

Fingers or finger spoof is a drinking game in which players guess the number of participating players who will keep their finger on a cup at the end of a countdown. A correct guess eliminates the player from the game and ensures they will not have to drink the cup. The last person in the game loses and must consume the cup contents. The cup could be a pint glass, pitcher, or other vessel (large enough for all players to put one finger on the rim) that is filled with a sip or small sample of all players' own beverage prior to the start of the game.

== Rules and setup ==
=== Equipment ===
- Alcoholic beverages, typically wine, beer or mixed drinks
- A pint glass, pitcher, or other vessel, but ideally a bowl

=== Setup and common rules ===
Fingers starts by a participant offering his empty or almost-empty pint glass, pitcher, or other vessel to be used as "the cup." Popular in circles where the game is called "Scoff", the game starts with someone yelling "Scoff!" followed by players assembling around the cup. Each player pours a small amount of their own beverage into "the cup".

The game progresses in a series of turns with the first turn going to the game participant who suggested playing the game. Each turn starts with all players putting one finger on the rim of the cup. When all fingers are on the rim, the player whose turn it is announces, "three - two - one" followed by a number. The number is the player's guess at how many fingers will remain on the cup. All participating players, including the player whose turn it is, have the option to keep their finger on the cup or to remove it from the cup after the "three - two - one" count. A correct guess eliminates the player from the game (a win), an incorrect guess keeps the player active in the game.

The game progresses clockwise as each player takes their turn. The game ends when only one person remains- the loser. The loser must drink the contents of the cup. If the game is played again, a second round, the loser is the first to start the game.

=== Variations and other rules ===
Two-man fingers variant

- Two-man Fingers: a version of fingers played with only 2 players. Each player uses both index fingers (4 fingers total) to start the game. Fingers are ordered player - opponent - player - opponent. The game progresses as if 4 individuals were playing.
- Balk: a balk is when a player whose turn it is starts the "three - two - one" count and does not announce, or waits too long to announce their guess number. The player loses his / her turn if a balk occurs. There should be no gap in timing when announcing the guess number after the "three - two - one" series.
- Slow Pull: a slow pull is when a participant is slow or decides late to remove their finger from the cup (within a second). Most players will agree that counting the remaining fingers after a number is called and then deciding to remove his / her finger (within a second) to cheat the current active player is next to impossible. For this reason, slow pulls should be considered fair game unless it is unreasonably delayed or there are fewer than 3-4 players remaining. All players (eliminated players included) should make the judgement call.
- Social: a social is when all players take one sip of their own drink. Socials occur when everyone coincidentally removes their finger during a call.
- Non-Celebration for the truly advanced: If you guess correctly and eliminate yourself from the game you can not show any emotion that might offend the other participants (celebrating, fist-pumping, smiling, etc.). If you do, you must apologize to the remaining players for your unwarranted celebration and re-enter the game.
- Idiot Cup: when one player calls out a number but makes the result impossible by their own action (i.e., calling 0 and leaving their own finger on the cup or calling 5 with only 4 players left like an idiot). In this case, the player has to finish the drink.
- Penalty: where a player calls a number out of turn they must down the drink.
- Finger Spoof Variations: Traditionally played in the pubs and sports clubs of Gloucestershire as an alternative to full (Three-Coin) spoof.
  - The game is played for any pre-agreed forfeit including purchasing a round of drinks, drinking an unpleasant drink as above, snorting snuff/mustard, etc. Penalties should also be pre-agreed.
  - Zero is referred to as Spoof.
  - No countdown occurs. Players should be alert.
  - False/impossible shout results in a penalty.
