= Susan Finger =

American engineer

Susan Finger is an American engineer whose research involves engineering design and additive manufacturing for mechanical engineering, bioengineering, and building engineering. She has held faculty positions at Carnegie Mellon University and leadership roles at the National Science Foundation. Her work includes research collaborations across multiple engineering disciplines as well as contributions to academic publishing and professional organizations.

== Education and career ==
Finger has been a faculty member in the Department of Civil and Environmental Engineering at the Carnegie Mellon University, where she held the rank of professor. She is currently serving as a project manager at the National Science Foundation and is on leave from Carnegie Mellon University.

She majored in astronomy, with a minor in medieval language and literature, at the University of Pennsylvania, graduating magna cum laude in 1972. She continued at the University of Pennsylvania for a master's degree in operations research in 1974, and completed a Ph.D. in electric power systems and civil engineering at the Massachusetts Institute of Technology in 1981.

She joined Boston University as an assistant professor in the Department of Manufacturing Engineering in 1981. She moved to the National Science Foundation as a program director for design theory and methodology in 1984, later becoming acting deputy division director. In 1987 she came to Carnegie Mellon University as a researcher in the Robotics Institute, and in 1991 she returned to a faculty position as assistant professor of civil engineering.

In CMU's Institute for Complex Engineered Systems, she became the founding director of the Engineering Design Research Lab. Alongside John R. Dixon, Finger co-founded the journal Research in Engineering Design, in 1989 and served as its first editor-in-chief.

== Recognition ==
Finger was named an ASME Fellow in 2013, for "major contributions in the field of engineering design education and research".

== Collaborations ==
Finger has collaborated with researchers across many engineering disciplines. Her collaborative work has contributed to developments in areas such as additive manufacturing, bioengineering, and building engineering. Through these partnerships, she has co-authored scholarly publications and contributed to research that connects design theory with practical engineering applications.
