= Finger Point =

Finger Point may refer to:

== Places in Antarctica ==
- Finger Point (South Sandwich Islands)
- Finger Point (Wilhelm Archipelago)
- Finger Point (Victoria Land)

== Other ==
- The Finger Points, a 1931 American film starring Richard Barthelmess and Fay Wray

== See also ==
- Fingerpointing (disambiguation)
