= Finger (spider) =

Scientific classification
- Kingdom: Animalia
- Phylum: Arthropoda
- Subphylum: Chelicerata
- Class: Arachnida
- Order: Araneae
- Infraorder: Araneomorphae
- Family: Salticidae
- Subtribe: Thiratoscirtina
- Genus: Finger; Wesołowska & Wiśniewski, 2023

Type species
- F. lechi Wesołowska & Wiśniewski, 2023

Species
- 5, see text

Genus of spiders

Finger is a genus of spiders in the family Salticidae.

== Distribution ==
Finger occurs in sub-Saharan Africa.

== Etymology ==
The genus name refers to the thumb-like shape of the male tibial apophysis.

== Species ==
As of January 2026, this genus includes five species:

- Finger chitato Wesołowska & Wiśniewski, 2023 – Angola
- Finger jamisonsuteri Wesołowska & Henrard, 2025 – Guinea
- Finger lechi Wesołowska & Wiśniewski, 2023 – Angola
- Finger minor Wiśniewski & Wesołowska, 2024 – Uganda
- Finger obscurus Wesołowska, Russell-Smith & Danflous, 2026 – Central African Republic
