= Finger-Tatuk Provincial Park =

Provincial park in British Columbia, Canada

- IUCN category II (national park)
- Location within British Columbia
- Interactive map of Finger-Tatuk Provincial Park
- Location: Range 4 Coast Land District, British Columbia, Canada
- Nearest city: Vanderhoof, BC
- Coordinates: 53°30′34″N 124°13′29″W
- Area: 17,151 ha (42,380 acres)
- Established: June 28, 1999
- Governing body: BC Parks

Finger-Tatuk Provincial Park is a provincial park in British Columbia, Canada. Established in 1999, it covers 17,151 hectares (42,380 acres) and includes Finger Lake and Tatuk Lake, as well as several smaller lakes (Bodley, Cory, Harp, Turff, and Vance) and archaeological sites once used by Dakelh (Carrier) First Nations peoples. The lakes are known for rainbow trout and kokanee salmon, and each of the two larger lakes has a resort.
