= Finger Mountain =

Topographical formation in Alaska, US

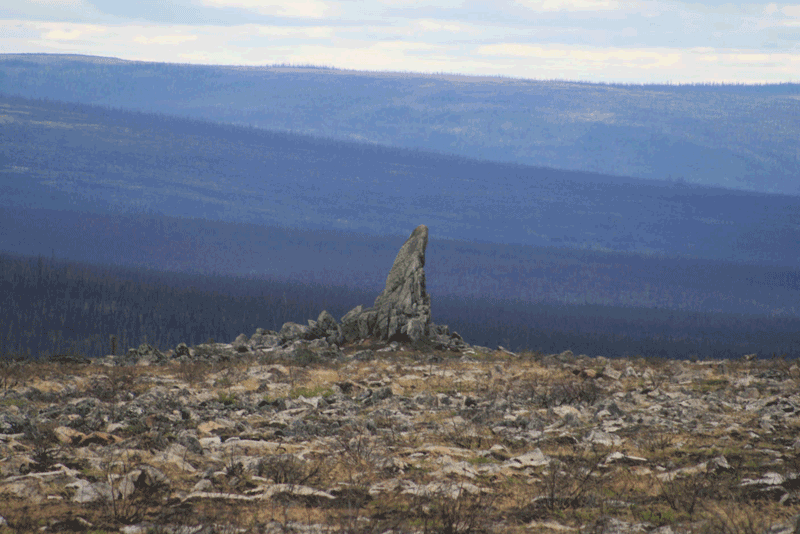
- Finger Rock, 2007

Highest point
- Elevation: 671 m (2,201 ft)
- Prominence: 202 m (663 ft)
- Coordinates: 66.38282°N 150.4997°W

Naming
- Etymology: Finger Rock

Geography

Finger Mountain is a topographical formation in interior Alaska. Not actually a mountain, it is a wide broad hill, with an altitude of around 2202 ft. It is named for Finger Rock, a distinctive granite protrusion on its surface. Finger Mountain Wayside is a partially maintained pullout along the Dalton Highway at mile 97.5. It features informational signs and some facilities for travelers.
