= Snowbound =

Snowbound may refer to:

== Music ==
=== Albums ===
- Snowbound (Sarah Vaughan album), 1962
- Snowbound (Fourplay album), 1999
- Snow Bound (The Chills album), 2018

=== Songs ===
- "Snowbound" (song), a song by Donald Fagen from the 1993 album Kamakiriad
- "Snow Bound", a song by Alphonse Mouzon from the 1974 album Mind Transplant
- "Snowbound", a song by the Ozark Mountain Daredevils from the 1977 album Don't Look Down
- "Snowbound", a song by Genesis from the 1978 album ...And Then There Were Three...
- "Snowbound", a song by The Rippingtons from the 1991 album Curves Ahead
- "Snow Bound", a song by Arch Enemy from the 2001 album Wages of Sin
- "Snowbound", a song by Kotipelto from the 2004 album Coldness
- "Snowbound", a song by Tim Finn from the 2008 album The Conversation
- "Snowbound", a 2012 single by Vienna Ditto

== Film and television ==
- Snowbound (1927 film), a film starring Betty Blythe
- Snowbound (1948 film), a film starring Stanley Holloway and Dennis Price
- Snowbound: The Jim and Jennifer Stolpa Story, a 1994 television movie
- Snowbound (2001 film), a film starring Erika Eleniak, Monika Schnarre, and Peter Dobson

=== Television episodes ===
- "Snowbound", an episode of The Bob Cummings Show season 2, 1956
- Snowbound, a television special in the Special Treat series, 1978
- "Snowbound", an episode of Benson season 1, 1979
- "Snowbound", an episode of Joe's World, 1980
- "Snowbound", an episode of Thunderbirds 2086, 1982
- "Snowbound", an episode of 227 season 3, 1988
- "Snowbound", an episode of The Hogan Family season 5, 1990
- "Snowbound", the pilot episode of The Angry Beavers, 1994
- "Snowbound", an episode of Billy the Cat season 1, 1996
- "Snowbound", an episode of Beverly Hills, 90210 season 6, 1996
- "Snowbound", an episode of Spin City season 1, 1997
- "Snowbound", an episode of Get Well Soon, 1997
- "Snowbound", an episode of Dennis and Gnasher series 2, 1998
- "Snow Bound", an episode of The Fairly OddParents season 3, 2003
- "Snowbound", an episode of Super Robot Monkey Team Hyperforce Go! season 2, 2005
- "Snowbound", an episode of Highway Thru Hell season 6, 2017
- "Snow Bound", an episode of Ice Road Truckers season 8, 2018

== Literature ==
- Snow-Bound, an 1866 long narrative poem by John Greenleaf Whittier
- Snowbound: The Record of a Theatrical Touring Party, a 1908 collection of short stories by Bram Stoker
- Snowbound, a 1987 novel by Lisa Jackson
- Snowbound, a 1991 novel in The Baby-sitters Club series
- Snowbound, a novel in the Nancy Drew on Campus series
- Snowbound, a 2004 novel by Nancy Atherton
- Snowbound, a 2010 novel by Richard S. Wheeler
- Snowbound, a 2018 novel by Maria Alexander
- Snowbound, a 2021 play by Peter Quilter

== Other uses ==
- Snowbound, an experimental theatre show starring Alice Lowe
- Snowbound (horse), a horse ridden by William Steinkraus at the 1968 Summer Olympics
