= Ice Road Truckers season 6 =

Season of television series

Ice Road Truckers
- Season 6
- No. of episodes: 16

Release
- Original network: History
- Original release: June 3 – September 23, 2012

Season chronology
- ← Previous; Season 5 Next → Season 7

This is a list of Ice Road Truckers Season 6 episodes.

The focus of this season is split among three locations, listed in "Route and destinations" below.

== Episodes ==
No. overall	No. in season	Title	Original release date
69	1	"Aces and Jokers"	June 3, 2012
In Whitehorse, Yukon, Alex signs on with Manitoulin Transportation and is immediately dispatched to take a load of badly needed food to Inuvik. His truck stops working not long after he begins the 500-mile run up the Dempster Highway, but it soon starts again and he eases onto the river crossings to complete his delivery. In Winnipeg, an unusually warm winter has shortened the ice road season and created a backlog of loads. As soon as Hugh and Rick report in, they are sent to pick up two trailers of construction supplies, abandoned in Berens River from the previous year's season. After Hugh spins out on loose snow at a corner, Rick pulls him loose but breaks a tow chain. In Fairbanks, Carlile must transport 70 loads of rig parts up to Prudhoe Bay within 10 days to get the oil fields' exploration efforts started. Jack and rookie Austin Wheeler pick up pipe sheds as part of a convoy. Austin voices displeasure not only at Jack's cautious pace due to his oversized load, but also at his decision to stop at Coldfoot for the night when the weather worsens. Fellow rookie Ronald "Pork Chop" Mangum reports in as well to take a load of pipes north. He gets off to a rough start with trainer Phil Kromm, who sees him having trouble shifting gears on a stretch of hills and takes over driving for the rest of the run. A third rookie, Darrell Ward, bristles at having to ride with a trainer (in this case, Tony Molesky) as they head out with a load of vehicles. That evening, he loses his lights and quickly repairs a blown fuse to get them working; as he pulls in at Prudhoe, Tony warns him not to become overconfident on this road.
70	2	"Sink or Swim"	June 10, 2012
In Manitoba, Hugh and Rick negotiate slushy roads, a half-thawed river crossing, and a low bridge before reaching Berens Point. They find the two abandoned trailers, but must wait for a loader to arrive and plow away the snow burying the wheels. Rick has trouble hooking up to his trailer and gets briefly stuck in snow along the road as he and Hugh start back to Winnipeg. In Inuvik, Alex picks up a load of store supplies bound for Tuktoyaktuk, following a road over the Arctic Ocean. He passes a truck that fell partway through the ice and froze in place, then enters a whiteout that causes him to lose his bearings. Once he makes radio contact with the store owner, he pulls in safely and gets a batch of muktuk as a snack for the trip south. In Fairbanks, Darrell is cleared to start making solo runs and heads north with a pump motor. Running into ice fog, he nearly skids out on a corner but reaches Prudhoe safely. Based on Phil's disapproving assessment, Ronald is assigned to make another training run, this time carrying a load of pipes with Tony riding along. After he again has trouble shifting gears, Tony has him pull in at Coldfoot and discusses his driving with Phil. Jack and Austin head north from Coldfoot, waiting until all other drivers have left due to their oversize loads. As they approach Atigun pass, Austin struggles to put on his tire chains (which he failed to inspect before starting the run). In Prudhoe, he is dispatched south to pick up a broken truck in Coldfoot and Jack goes along to keep an eye on him. The next morning, Jack watches as Austin loads the truck onto his trailer, leading to resentment on the younger driver's part.
71	3	"Hammer Down"	June 17, 2012
With 24 hours left in the 70-load rig move, Jack and Austin head north from Fairbanks with a superstructure section and a screen house, respectively. Austin rides so far in front of Jack that neither can see the other, creating a safety hazard. Darrell takes an oversized load north, but has to slow down when it starts shifting on his trailer. Ronald is cleared for a solo run, but must follow Phil up the Dalton for now. Once all four drivers reach Prudhoe, they get ready to move the final loads out to the oil fields. At the rear of the convoy, Ronald drives too fast and too close to Darrell, disobeying the road's safety guidelines. After he causes two delays, first with a leaky air line and then by pulling his truck loose from its trailer, Phil sends him back to Fairbanks and wonders whether he is qualified to drive the Dalton. Jack hauls both his own load and Ronald's at once to finish the rig move on time. In Inuvik, Alex picks up a load of snowmobiles bound for the village of Aklavik. After negotiating fragile ice on the Mackenzie River delta, he delivers his load and hurries back to Inuvik through a storm that makes the road almost impassable. In Manitoba, Hugh nearly crashes into Rick when Rick makes a nighttime stop to relieve himself. The two bring their construction supplies to Winnipeg, their first completed deliveries of the season.
72	4	"No Way Out"	June 24, 2012
In Fairbanks, Austin picks up an excavator for his first solo run, while Jack voices his concerns to the Carlile bosses about the rookie's driving habits. Along the way, he helps two stranded trucks get moving, one who needs a push over a hill and another blocking the road in a fast-developing storm. When he tries to pull a third truck out of a ditch, though, he ends up stuck as well. Meanwhile, Jack goes north from Fairbanks with a load of lumber and a pickup truck. As he approaches the storm, one of his trailer wheels begins wobbling dangerously, he stops briefly to remove both wheels in that pair, then pulls in at Coldfoot for the night. Darrell hauls a load of heaters from Coldfoot to Prudhoe and picks up a stack of flatbeds to take south as the storm closes in. He, Phil, and the other drivers on the road decided to drop their loads and stop at Coldfoot. When Ronald reports in at Fairbanks, he is suspended from driving for the immediate future due to his mistakes during the Prudhoe rig move. In Winnipeg, Hugh and Rick pick up loads of water/sewage tanks bound for St. Theresa Point, 300 miles to the north. They negotiate a freshly opened road, with fragile lake ice crossings, but find it closed as they reach the final turn. After a call to the client, they dump the tanks off their trailers and head back toward Winnipeg.
73	5	"Desperate Measures"	July 1, 2012
In Fairbanks, Ronald returns to duty but bristles at his next assignment: delivering a load of dog food to the downtown area for the start of the Yukon Quest dogsled race. Farther up the Dalton, Austin's wheels are now buried deep in snow after a night stuck in the ditch. A road crew pulls him loose with a snowblower, allowing the traffic jam behind him to start moving, and he delivers his load to Prudhoe and heads south. As a severe storm moves in on the road, Darrell picks up his abandoned flatbeds and follows a road crew to keep moving south. Coming over Atigun Pass he learns of a collision between a truck and a pilot car. The news spreads quickly, with drivers scrambling to get updates on the second driver's condition. Darrell helps move the wreckage off the road and continues his run, only to be fined $300 during an inspection at a weigh station. Jack, meanwhile, pushes through deep snowdrifts in order to bring his load to Prudhoe. In Winnipeg, Hugh and Rick pick up cement trucks needed in Red Sucker Lake - a high-paying job, but hazardous due to the weight and road conditions. They ease over weak lake ice and hit a rough stretch of road during the night. Alex starts on a 1,000-mile round trip between Inuvik and Dawson City to bring in a load of supplies. When the storm over the Dalton moves onto the Dempster and closes the road, he is forced to return to Inuvik.
74	6	"Blood, Sweat, and Gears"	July 8, 2012
In Manitoba, Hugh and Rick stop to secure a loose fuel tank and continue their cement-truck delivery. As they approach Red Sucker Lake, though, they are pulled over for an inspection and learn that they are over the road's weight limit. They are forced to abandon the loads and head back to Winnipeg; along the way, Rick gets briefly stuck in a snowbank until a passing motorist pulls him loose. Meanwhile, Alex fights through a late rendezvous, bad weather, and slick uphill runs to pick up a load of groceries and deliver it to Inuvik before the road becomes impassable again. Ronald and Darrell are assigned to drive together in a convoy, taking pipes and support members from Fairbanks to Prudhoe. Darrell repeatedly bristles at Ronald's slow pace and reaches Coldfoot two hours ahead of him. Forced to stop here due to the late hour, the two argue over scheduling versus safety. The next day, Darrell is again first out, chaining up and crossing Atigun well ahead of Ronald. Austin picks up an oversized load, a cabin that must be delivered across town to its owner that night. Loading it onto his trailer and maneuvering it in the city streets is a challenge for him, but he brings it in with only minor damage from scraping an overhead road sign. Jack is irritated to learn that Austin got this load; he is given a water truck to take to Prudhoe. A close call with an oncoming truck nearly sends him off the road, leaving him badly shaken. The next day, having delivered it and returned to Fairbanks, he becomes frustrated and drives off when there are no available loads for him.
75	7	"Hard Road Ahead"	July 15, 2012
In Fairbanks, Carlile owner Harry McDonald and terminal manager Lane Keator head north with loads of explosives to make up for Jack's continuing absence. Darrell and Ronald continue south from Coldfoot, with Darrell warning Ronald not to crowd him due to the frost-buckled roads. They meet Harry and Lane coming north, and Lane has a brief talk with Darrell to discuss both his and Ronald's driving performance to date. Ronald spins out on a hill, forcing Darrell to wait as he chains his tires, and the two reach Fairbanks. Harry and Lane reach their destination, a gold mine north of Coldfoot, but cannot immediately find anyone to take delivery. Lane ventures into the nighttime wilderness and finds the mining crew so they can unload the cargo. Meanwhile, Austin takes a load of pickup trucks north from Fairbanks, having been cautioned not to speed, and becomes annoyed at other truckers' ribbing. However, he calms down during a talk with another trucker while waiting for a spun-out tanker to be pulled free, then pulls in at Prudhoe that night. Returning to Winnipeg, Hugh and Rick argue with their bosses over the botched cement truck delivery. Rick storms out of the office and visits the hospital to get a diagnosis for an illness that he blames on his truck. A cleanup crew finds evidence of a deer mouse infestation and possible Hanta virus contamination, forcing the truck out of service. In Inuvik, Alex picks up an excavator bound for Aklavik; the load is over the road's weight limit, but he gets a special permit for the run. His brakes start to malfunction, but he cannot risk stopping on the river ice and pushes on to finish his run.
76	8	"Proving Ground"	July 22, 2012
In Fairbanks, Ronald starts his first solo run with a load of supplies needed in the village of Manley Hot Springs, a new destination for Carlile deliveries. The road is rough, narrow, and slick, with a steep drop-off on one side. After easing across a bridge with almost no overhead clearance to spare, he brings his load in safely. Austin and veteran Carey Hall are called in to help with a heavy haul mission, a 100-ton modular building that must reach Prudhoe within 72 hours. The crew loses time due to maneuvering problems on the road leading to the Dalton, then again when one truck develops brake trouble. That night, Carey's truck develops engine trouble and he decides to drop the load and return to the shop in Fairbanks, rejecting Austin's offer to pull the load. Darrell picks up a load of sheet rock and heads north, making good time until he finds a jackknifed truck blocking the road. Well after nightfall, the wreck is cleared and he gets moving again. Jack checks in at Fairbanks and gets a chilly reception from Lane. Nevertheless, he is put back on duty and heads up the Dalton with a load of pipes, since there is still a large volume of cargo to move. Hauling a load of assorted shipments south from Inuvik to Dawson City, Alex finds the speed limits lowered on the Dempster river crossings. He cautiously checks the ice and drives across, keeping his door open in case he needs to jump clear. He hurries south through good weather and brings his load in that night. In Winnipeg, Rick is still too sick to drive and must wait for his test results. Hugh picks up a load of septic tanks needed in Bloodvein. The route takes him along a freshly opened crossing over Lake Winnipeg, past a ridge between two sheets of ice that cover the water. Once he gets off the lake, the finishes his run and starts back for Winnipeg.
77	9	"Braking Bad"	July 29, 2012
Road crews spend the day defusing potential avalanche sites on Atigun to keep the road clear. In Fairbanks, Ronald starts his first solo run up the Dalton carrying a load of sandbags. Fever, congestion, and coughing make it hard for him to concentrate all day long until he reaches Prudhoe that night. With a relief driver taking Carey's place in the lead for the heavy haul convoy, Austin makes a driving mistake that has the potential to send all three trucks into the ditch. However, he corrects it in time for the final push over Atigun and the convoy meets its deadline to arrive at Prudhoe. As Jack goes north with his load of pipes, he hears them shifting on his trailer and stops to check them. The pipes are badly off-center on his trailer, so he re-secures them with a chain as best he can and drives on. Having spent the night in Coldfoot, Darrell gets an early start to stay ahead of Jack. He slides badly on the road while crossing Atigun, but gets to Prudhoe before Jack, who loses time due to poor visibility at sunset. In Winnipeg, Rick's truck has been fully de-contaminated, but he is still too sick to drive. Hugh calls in Derek, the company mechanic, and Vlad, the dispatcher, to help move three loads of cement to Pauingassi First Nation. Derek, who has never driven on ice before, becomes very nervous as the convoy approaches Lake Winnipeg. Meanwhile, Alex must take a load of chemicals from Whitehorse to Cantung Mine within 12 hours, following another driver along a narrow road. After pushing through the dangerous mountain route and a slipping transmission, he reaches his destination with an hour to spare.
78	10	"Stacking the Deck"	August 5, 2012
In Prudhoe, Darrell chafes at being denied a southbound load as Jack gets one due to seniority. When he reaches Coldfoot, he finds a load of pipes waiting for him, left by a driver who had a family emergency, and starts north again. He brakes hard to avoid hitting a herd of caribou on the road. Meanwhile, Jack fights the glare of sunlight reflecting off the ice and skids nearly off the road. Both bring their loads in, and Darrell picks up a load to take south. Heading north with a light load of construction supplies, Ronald tries to keep his speed up so he can have enough momentum to get over hills. A slow fuel tanker up ahead grates on his nerves until he gets a chance to pass it. Heavy fog on the final stretch leads to a near miss with a southbound truck before he reaches Prudhoe. In Fairbanks, Austin is first to report in at the depot and picks up his first solo heavy-haul load, a snowplow. The trailer's landing gear is frozen, so he ties it off with a chain to get started on the run. On a steep uphill turn, he slides badly and spins out; an oncoming truck nearly hits him as he scrambles to chain his tires in the middle of the road. He brings the snowplow in safely, leaving himself, Jack, and Darrell tied at the top of the Alaska load count. At the Cantung Mine, Alex visits the tunnels to see the crew at work, then picks up a load of tungsten ore bound for Watson Lake. As he negotiates the narrow mine road, he misses a gear and briefly slides downhill backwards before managing to stop the truck; he later brings the load in safely. In Manitoba, Hugh and his two drivers ease over Lake Winnipeg and reach Pauingassi several hours late, finding no one to take delivery of their loads. Hugh finds a loader on the site and uses it to hoist the bags off the trailers, one at a time, so they can start back toward Winnipeg before morning.
79	11	"Hurricane Alley"	August 12, 2012
Alex and another driver start a two-day run from Whitehorse to Inuvik to deliver groceries and supplies. The route takes them through "Hurricane Alley," a stretch notorious for whiteouts and strong winds, and a storm closes in as they head up the Dempster. With visibility dropping to near zero, they are forced to stop and cannot find any trace of the road. A snowplow happens to come through three hours later, giving them a chance to follow it through the storm and complete their delivery. In Fairbanks, Darrell picks up a load of sheet rock, on a badly worn-out trailer. He hurries north and passes Jack, who is hauling a fuel tanker and nearly skids off the road. The next morning, Darrell hits an extremely bumpy stretch and must slow down to spare his trailer before reaching Prudhoe; he then picks up a bus for the return to Fairbanks. Jack, critical of his push to top the load count, muscles up to the top of Atigun but briefly loses control on the downhill side due to his load's weight. Austin is dispatched to drive 423 miles south from Prudhoe and pick up a water truck from a mining camp. It proves to be almost as wide as his trailer, and he has to take great care in driving it on board. Meanwhile, Ronald takes a load of gravel north toward Prudhoe and has to deal with oncoming drivers and slipping wheels as he comes over Atigun. After delivering the load, he has to return to Fairbanks empty as Jack pulls in.
80	12	"Battle Lines"	August 19, 2012
In Fairbanks, Austin takes a load of long pipes whose rear end must be supported on a separate dolly. As he negotiates the turns to keep the dolly from swinging around, it begins to drift out of alignment. He and his pilot car driver pull it back to center before finishing the run. Darrell, heading north with a tanker of machine oil, develops alternator trouble when he is 30 miles from Prudhoe. The truck will not start again after he shuts it off, leaving him with no heat, but he is close enough to his destination to call for help on his cell phone. A loader arrives to bring in both Darrell and the truck, and the tanker is left for another driver to pick up. The next morning, Austin meets Darrell and takes him and the truck back to Fairbanks. Ronald bristles at being assigned to drive with Jack, hauling mixed loads to Prudhoe. Part of Jack's load must be delivered to a certain point on the Dalton first, and Ronald is expected to help unload it. At the dropoff, though, Ronald goes ahead by himself and leaves Jack to do the unloading alone. The next morning, after both check in at Prudhoe, Jack sharply upbraids Ronald for leaving him alone and mentions that he will have to report the incident to Lane in Fairbanks. In Winnipeg, Hugh and the other drivers are racing to move loads. Rick returns to work, still feeling somewhat fatigued and worn down, and he and Hugh start a 300-mile run to Wasagamack First Nation with loads of septic tanks. As the trucks bounce and skid on the late-season roads, Rick sideswipes a road official's pickup; the damage is minor, but the collision costs them time. They ease over the center ridge on Lake Winnipeg, recently repaired after a trucker damaged it by driving too fast. With less than 10 miles remaining, Rick refuses to go any farther and the two pull over for the night, to Hugh's dissatisfaction as he had wanted to finish the run that same day.
81	13	"Cold-Blooded"	August 26, 2012
The morning after their unscheduled stop, Hugh leaves Rick sleeping and delivers his load of septic tanks to Wasagamack. He picks up a shack several feet longer than his trailer and hauls it back to Winnipeg, noting the extent to which the road is melting down. Rick fumes at being left behind as he brings in his load of tanks and starts the return trip. On the Dempster, Alex delivers a snowblower to a road camp so the crew can clear Hurricane Alley, then picks up a loader needed in Inuvik to help keep those roads open. Its increased weight forces him to take extra precautions as he crosses the Peel River before bringing it in. In Alaska, the approach of an extreme cold front threatens to shut down the Prudhoe oil fields for days. Jack and Austin head north from Fairbanks (respectively taking lumber and a pickup truck, and long overhead crane beams), trying to deliver their loads before the shutdown. The length and weight of Austin's load give him difficulty on the uphill runs when he decides not to chain his tires, causing delays for himself and the southbound drivers. Jack notices a loose chain on his load and stops to tighten it, then drives into the night. By the time he reaches Prudhoe, though, he finds that the shutdown has already begun. As Ronald starts north with a load, Phil and Lane meet to discuss his overall performance. Concerned over Ronald's leaving Jack alone on the road at night, Lane assigns Phil to keep an eye on him from a distance. Phil heads out with a tanker, tailing Ronald and noting his trouble. Ronald spots Phil and decides to pull over to let him pass, but Phil does not fall for the trick and criticizes Ronald for it. After both reach Prudhoe, Phil calls Lane to deliver his unfavorable opinion. Darrell's truck comes out of the repair shop and he starts north with a load of long pipes. Though his engine starts to lose power shortly after starting out, he decides to push on. The problem steadily worsens and leaves him struggling to climb a steep grade, so he relies on his pilot car driver to help pull him over the top. Here, he stops to drain water from his fuel filter and is able to start again with full power.
82	14	"Chopping Block"	September 9, 2012
With 10 days left in the Alaska ice road season and Prudhoe reopened after the cold-weather shutdown, drivers are hurrying to move all the loads they can. Darrell and Austin head north from Fairbanks with groceries and a front-end loader, respectively, while Jack comes in later and gets a load of pipes. Darrell pushes ahead and reaches Prudhoe that night, but the strain on both Jack and his truck prompts him to stop at Coldfoot. Approaching Atigun, Austin pushes a spun-out driver over the summit, then finishes his run to Prudhoe. When Ronald reports in, Lane fires him, noting the widespread opinion among the other drivers that he is not cut out for the ice road. To keep the loads moving, Carlile calls in Season 4 driver Ray Veilleux and sends him north with a large piece of pipe. After the first 100 miles, his truck loses power due to an oil leak, leaving him stranded. Well after nightfall, Phil drives by and picks him up. In Manitoba, Hugh, Rick and Vlad are hauling loads of cement to Pauingassi. Rick, still angry over being left behind by Hugh, speeds ahead and loses one bag on the bumpy roads; with no way to hoist it back onto his trailer, he drives on. After Vlad finds the dropped bag, he and Hugh use a loader on Vlad's trailer to pick it up. Rick is the first to arrive that night, and by the time the others pull in, he has already unloaded and started back to Winnipeg. In Inuvik, Alex picks up a trailer of compressed gases, including highly flammable acetylene, bound for Whitehorse. Passing a wrecked truck that overturned due to high winds, he struggles to keep from sliding on his way through Hurricane Alley and brings his load in safely.
83	15	"Race the Melt"	September 16, 2012
In Prudhoe, Darrell and Jack are dispatched to carry supplies to Nuiqsut - Darrell with food, supplies, and a flatbed; Jack with a tanker of fuel. The road will be closed at sundown that evening, forcing the truckers to move out quickly on the weak, slushy ice. Once they reach Nuiqsut, Jack offloads his fuel quickly; Darrell, though, must deliver his cargo around town and then load some pickup trucks onto his flatbed for the return trip. With time running out, Jack surprises Darrell by loading the flatbed himself so both of them can get out of town before the road closes. Ray takes a load of pipes up from Fairbanks and makes good time into the evening, successfully climbing an uphill stretch where he went into the ditch two years earlier. He has a close call with a southbound truck before completing the run. Austin, going north with a cube van, hears noise from his engine but cannot find anything immediately wrong when he stops to check it. When he returns to the Carlile shop, he learns that the truck's fuel injection system must be replaced, a job that will take at least a full day. In Manitoba, Hugh and Rick are making their last outbound trip of the season, hauling construction materials to Pauingassi. As they cross Lake Winnipeg, Rick finds a southbound truck speeding toward him on the thin lake ice. He and Hugh complete the crossing, but are not sure if the truck's speed may have damaged the crossing's ice. After one last, short, nearly disintegrated ice crossing, they pull into Pauingassi and unload, Hugh helping to free Rick's trailer so they can hurry back toward Winnipeg. In Whitehorse, Alex takes Manitoulin's largest trailer to haul a huge assorted load to Inuvik, possibly his last of the season. The trailer is not rated for ice road use, and it starts to shake and slide as he enters Hurricane Alley. Both it and the cargo emerge intact as he finishes the run.
84	16	"The Final Showdown"	September 23, 2012
In Manitoba, Hugh and Rick start back toward Winnipeg, over a route that is rapidly melting back into swampland. They reach solid ground shortly before the maintenance crew officially closes the ice-road portion for the year. Once they return to Winnipeg, Hugh voices his dissatisfaction about the season's difficulties to the Polar Industries management. He decides that he and Rick do not want to drive for the company anymore. In Inuvik, Alex picks up a load of firewood and supplies needed in Tuktoyaktuk and starts onto the cracked, weakened ice of the Arctic Ocean. Although the surface has developed major fractures that briefly cause him to skid, he decides to push on and brings the load in with the villagers' gratitude. In Fairbanks, Jack and Darrell each pick up loads that must reach Prudhoe by the end of the day: oil rig parts and pipe elbows, respectively. Although Darrell passes Jack, Jack uses his experience on the curves to retake the lead as the two race north. Jack reaches Prudhoe just ahead of Darrell, and Ray pulls in later that night, having taken a load of methanol south from Prudhoe and returned with a load of pipes. With his truck now out of the shop, Austin picks up a modular building and starts north. Shortly into the trip, though, he develops the same engine trouble that cut his last run short. He abandons the load and returns to Fairbanks, frustrated over not being able to complete the job expected of him. Sean Parnell, Governor of Alaska, arrives in Prudhoe the next morning to thank the Carlile drivers for their hard work. After an end-of-season cookout in Fairbanks, Lane announces that Jack has topped the load count. Final load count (Alaska): Jack Jessee - 29; Darrell Ward - 28; Austin Wheeler - 23; Ray Veilleux - 5 [not full season]; Final load count (Canada): Alex Debogorski - 25; Hugh Rowland - 14; Rick Yemm - 6

== Returning drivers ==
Debogorski, Rowland, and Yemm continue driving in Canada for this season, moving cargo along the Dempster Highway (Debogorski) and Manitoba's winter roads (Rowland and Yemm). Jessee (seasons 3 and 4) returns to drive the Dalton along with three newcomers, and Hall appears in one episode to help move a modular building up from Fairbanks. Near the end of the season, Veilleux (season 4) is called in to help transport the last loads up to Prudhoe Bay. Molesky and Kromm are involved in training drivers new to driving on the Dalton Highway for Carlile Transportation. Additionally, both Molesky and Kromm independently monitor other drivers' standards and behavior, and advise Fairbanks Terminal Manager Lane Keator if there are issues like those that led to Redmon and "Porkchop" being fired.

== New drivers ==
- Darrell Ward (1964–2016): Coming to Alaska from Montana, Ward has 31 years of highway trucking experience, including driving logging trucks in the Rocky Mountains, and drove the Dalton for Alaska West Express in 2009. This is his first (and only) year at Carlile, and he ends up coming second to Jack Jessee by one load. Darrell, easily one of IRT's most popular drivers ever, was killed in a plane crash at the age of 52 on August 28, 2016. Ward at the time was a business partner with Lisa Kelly. The plane crash occurred near Rock Creek, Montana; pilot was Mark Melotz, who also perished in the crash.
- Austin Wheeler: Wheeler, 23, has been a Carlile employee for almost two years, transporting heavy loads in southern Alaska before transferring to the Fairbanks depot. While his season ended early towards the end due to engine power issues, he earned credit in saving Darrell, when the latter was stranded in the middle of the season.
- Ronald "Porkchop" Mangum: Mangum, 35, is a South Carolina trucker with 14 years of experience. Like Ward, he started his first season on the Dalton; he is fired near the end of the season due to concerns over his driving performance.

== Route and destinations ==
- Dalton Highway: This is the final season for the Dalton on the show.
- Dempster Highway: Connects the Northwest Territories to the rest of Canada's road network through the Yukon.
- Manitoba ice roads

== Final load counts ==
Alaska

- Jessee – 29
- Ward – 28
- Wheeler – 23
- Veilleux – 5 (not in the full season)

Canada

- Debogorski – 25
- Rowland – 14
- Yemm – 6
