= Ice Road Truckers season 9 =

Season of television series

Ice Road Truckers
- Season 9
- No. of episodes: 10

Release
- Original network: History
- Original release: August 2 – October 18, 2015

Season chronology
- ← Previous; Season 8 Next → Season 10

This is a list of Ice Road Truckers Season 9 episodes. On July 21, 2015, History announced season 9 would premiere August 2, 2015, at 9/8c.

== Episodes ==
With the departure of Rowland and VP Express from the series due to a 2014 pickup accident which severely injured him while riding with one of the series’ producers, the "dash for the cash" theme is less emphasized from this season on. As a result, load counts are no longer shown, and the focus shifts to delivering loads to communities as shortening ice road seasons permit, as the season's two-part finale demonstrates.

No. overall	No. in season	Title	Original release date
109	1	"Crossing Enemy Lines"	August 2, 2015
Mark gets Polar off to a quick start as the season opens, sending Alex and Todd onto the ice roads early. Alex notes cracks and holes in the ice as he crosses the Hayes River, hauling a camp shack to Shamattawa. The next morning, he brings the load in. While taking an emergency load of heating supplies to Wasagamack, Todd skids badly on the slick road and slides into a snowbank. By looping a strap around a tree and one axle, he improvises a winch and pulls himself free so he can continue his run and make the delivery by day's end. Still in business for himself, Darrell quickly secures two emergency loads of building supplies needed in Garden Hill. He takes Lisa on as a partner, offering her partial ownership of the company, and the two set out. Shortly into the run, though, Lisa's truck loses power and she is forced to return to Winnipeg for repairs. She loses half a day waiting on it to be fixed, then hurries to make up for lost time. Darrell reaches Garden Hill the next morning, and Lisa comes in just in time to meet the deadline. Finding himself shorthanded by Lisa's departure, Mark calls in Art and sends him to Shamattawa with lumber and a shack. Pulled over by the Department of Transportation for a paperwork check, Art finds that he does not have his truck registration on hand; however, he is let off with only a warning. Stopping to check his load, he finds that the shack has shifted on the trailer and is in danger of falling off. He re-secures it as best he can, eases his way over the final three miles, and reaches Shamattawa to finish the run.
110	2	"Icy Grave"	August 9, 2015
Mark sends Todd out with a load of heating supplies that must reach Wasagamack by the following morning. After spinning out on a hill that night, he spends several hours digging his wheels free so he can complete the delivery on time. Meanwhile, Alex delivers a load of groceries donated by Polar to a food drive in St. Theresa Point. At his destination, the village chief gives him a painting as a token of appreciation. Carrying lumber to Garden Hill, Art must negotiate a rough road that is frozen solid and dotted with flags that mark dangerous spots. The final obstacle is a 10-mile ice crossing whose weight limit is barely high enough to accommodate his truck, but he completes the run safely after nearly an hour on the ice. Darrell takes a load of construction supplies to the community of Pikangikum, whose road has just been reopened after a major fracture in its ice crossing. He sees several trucks by the roadside, wrecked and abandoned in previous years, and eases over the ice to bring in the cargo. Hauling construction supplies to the village of Brochet along a poorly maintained road, Lisa pushes through several stretches of open water that threaten to bog down her truck. That evening, she discovers that she has mistakenly followed the road to Lac Brochet and must backtrack three hours. Spinning out briefly on the uphill slopes, she relies on momentum to get rolling again and finishes the run to secure a long-term delivery contract.
111	3	"Trail Blazers"	August 16, 2015
Mark sends Todd to Pikangikum with a crane weighing 130,000 pounds, the heaviest load moved by Polar to date. Despite Mark's assurances that the road's ice crossing will be kept clear for Todd, he encounters an oncoming truck on the ice. It quickly turns around and retreats onto the shore, and he delivers the crane safely. Art hurries to St. Theresa Point to pick up a trailer abandoned from the previous year; it is needed in Winnipeg for a haul the next morning. After skidding his way through the final 50 miles of the trip, he finds the trailer stuck in deep frozen snow. He uses a loader parked in the yard to dig out the tires, but they are still frozen to the ground and he must shovel them off by hand. After working for a total of 14 hours, he pulls the trailer free that night and starts the return trip to Winnipeg. Learning about some building supplies that Polar is to haul out in three days, Darrell offers to take them immediately. The load is due in the village of Kingfisher First Nation, 500 miles away. While on the road, Darrell gets an irate phone call from Mark over his decision to commandeer the run. After pushing through a rocky stretch, he begins to hear strange noises from his truck; the cause is an air leak due to a broken hose clamp. An improvised repair job with plastic zip ties stops the leak and allows him to finish the run ahead of Polar's schedule. As part of a new contract, Lisa takes a load of building supplies to Poplar Hill, fighting to keep moving through the road's deep ruts. That night, she comes to an unmarked ice crossing without knowing its length or weight limit, and spots a snowcat half-frozen in the ice while driving across. She brings her load in safely to secure the contract.
112	4	"New Cold Blood"	August 23, 2015
Mark hires a new driver, Mike Simmons, and sends him out with Art for his first run. The two are hauling building supplies and pontoon boats to the fishing resort of Elk Island Lodge, 400 miles away. Both Mark and Art express concerns over Mike's cocky attitude and lack of ice road experience. Art's speed challenges Mike to keep pace on the rough roads; that evening, they come to a 10-mile ice crossing that is not maintained by public road crews. Night falls as they make their way across the ice, and Art tries to calm a jittery Mike with an impromptu poetry recital. Once they reach their destination, Art congratulates Mike for his first successful ice road run. Todd takes building supplies to Muskrat Dam, whose ice road has just opened, and must fight through bumps and ruts that threaten to shake his load off the trailer. A hard jolt knocks the plug out of his compressed air tank, causing a leak that locks his brakes, and he finds himself stranded with no way to repair the leak or call for help. As Alex heads to Big Trout Lake with a load of building supplies, he encounters several unmarked forks and intersections in the road. Choosing the paths with the most signs of use, he successfully delivers his cargo the following morning. Since the ice crossing on the road to Pikangikum has become damaged by truck traffic, it will be closed for the season within 24 hours. Lisa, hauling cement to the village, sees the ice cracking as she eases across and jumps out of the truck for fear of breaking through. However, she completes the run safely and ahead of the road closure. Meanwhile, Darrell starts for Muskrat Dam with his own load of building supplies, well behind Todd. As the day goes on, he fights for traction and spins out on a slick, steep uphill run; he reaches the top on his second try, then hurries to make up for lost time. He catches up to Todd and gives him a replacement plug for the air tank, and both complete their runs that night.
113	5	"Power Trip"	August 30, 2015
With temperatures rising several weeks earlier than in past years, roads and ice crossings are rapidly deteriorating. Darrell and Lisa secure their biggest contract to date: two electrical transformers that must reach Deer Lake by the following morning. They start out with the equipment, as well as a loader to move it, but must contend with slush and water flows that riddle the path. As they traverse a 7-mile ice crossing, Lisa hits a rough patch that causes her to skid briefly. They cross the lake and drive into the night, but a road crew working on an ice bridge will not let them through until repairs are finished. As part of a government contract, Mark sends Todd to Tadoule Lake with a load of grader blades needed at the local airport. Following a long, poorly maintained road, he eventually finds that the rough conditions have shaken the blades off his trailer. After loading them up by hand, he pours water over them to freeze them in place and starts out again. The load reaches the airport on time, opening the possibility of further government work for Polar. Art heads for the city of Thompson, intending to pick up a load of medical supplies and haul it to Garden Hill. However, he is forced to pull over after his engine develops oil pressure trouble and then cuts out. Finding the oil reservoir to be nearly empty, he calls Mark for a tow into Thompson and passes time in a bowling alley while waiting on repairs. Mark begins to think that Art's problems are due to his driving style. Mike takes an excavator to Shamattawa for his first solo run, dealing with buckled earth that makes for a rough, dangerous ride. He gets the bottom of his trailer stuck on the top of a large hump and cannot move, but careful use of the excavator's bucket allows him to push himself free. After filling in the holes caused by the bucket digging into the road surface, he continues on and reaches Shamattawa safely.
114	6	"Break On Through"	September 13, 2015
Although the ice bridge on the road to Deer Lake will not officially reopen until dawn, Darrell and Lisa take a risk by sneaking ahead after the work crew has finished for the night. They both cross safely and deliver their transformers on time. During the return trip, with Lisa bringing back a load of scrap metal, a broken fan belt causes Darrell's engine to overheat and forces him to stop. Lisa draws on her Alaska push trucking experience to keep them both moving and avoid an expensive towing bill. They cover a total of 70 miles in this fashion until reaching a town where Darrell can have repairs done. Mark informs Todd that the load of grader blades he hauled to Tadoule Lake was short by three when he delivered it, jeopardizing Polar's government contract. Todd is assigned to take a load of lumber and pick up the missing blades in Lynn Lake along the way. That night, with the blades secured, he stops on the roadside to eat dinner over a campfire and sleep in his truck; he reaches Tadoule Lake the next morning and delivers his cargo. Meanwhile, Mike is taking a load of cement to Shamattawa, braving a road roughened by a cold snap. He slides into a snowbank and is unable to free himself by chaining his tires, but a passing trucker pulls him loose so he can finish the run. With Art's truck now fixed, Mark sends him to Sachigo Lake First Nation in Ontario, 500 miles away, with a load of construction supplies. Both the road and its lake crossing are rapidly thawing, and Art hurries to complete the round trip before the end-of-season shutdown. He makes a 5-mile lake crossing to bring in the load, then follows a different route back to Winnipeg that brings him to an unmarked ice crossing awash in water. His front wheels get caught in a collapsing patch, leaving him unable to move.
115	7	"The Art of Survival"	September 20, 2015
As the lake ice starts to give way beneath Art's wheels, he returns to the shore and calls Mark for instructions to find a safer route back to Winnipeg. He reaches the Polar yard safely, to his and Mark's relief. Meanwhile, Alex is taking cement to Pikangikum. Although the road was closed several days earlier, it has been reopened to allow the season's last loads in. After bogging down in the muck on a steep hill, he chains his tires and manages to reach the top so he can complete the run. Darrell and Lisa have secured a contract to haul two loads to Deer Lake, and Lisa takes building supplies as the first load. However, high temperatures have turned the road into a muddy, slushy mess and left its ice crossing awash in water. In Winnipeg, Darrell learns that Polar has undercut his rates in order to secure the second load of the contract. Offering to reduce his price even farther, he hurries to the Polar yard to hook up the load and get moving, despite Mark's attempt to intercept him. Both make their deliveries in Deer Lake, but during the return trip, Lisa spins out on an uphill run and slides backwards into a ditch. A road crew pulls her loose with their snowcat, and she successfully tops the hill and drives on through the night. A patch of soft snow causes her to get stuck again, and Darrell finds himself unable to move as well.
116	8	"Mother Nature Scorned"	October 4, 2015
Darrell improvises a winch, hooking tow straps to an axle and a tree, and pulls himself loose so he can get moving again. He catches up to Lisa the next morning and pulls her free, and the two resume their drive to Winnipeg. After one final, fragile ice crossing, they pull into town to face the likely prospect of extensive repair work due to the deteriorating road conditions. Art is hauling a double-trailer load of wood fuel pellets to Brochet. Since loads this heavy are not allowed on the final stretch road so late in the season, he recruits Joey Barnes to take half of it. Joey slides into a snowbank on a sharp turn; he manages to free himself, but his maneuvering tears up the road surface and makes the turn more difficult for Art. Both drivers reach Brochet and deliver their loads. Taking a load of supplies to Big Trout Lake, Alex finds himself facing an ice crossing with no way to tell if it can support his truck's weight. Open water flows on the ice cause him to briefly lose traction and jackknife, but he straightens out and completes the crossing safely. That evening, he finds that the road has been closed and must haul the load back to Winnipeg. While delivering a loader to South Indian Lake, Todd pulls his truck onto a ferry boat in order to cross a lake whose ice has already melted.
117	9	"Hell Freezes Over"	October 11, 2015
Mark gets a call from a client at a lodge on the Seal River, needing an excavator and a load of building supplies. With no one but Todd immediately available, he offers Darrell and Lisa a chance to split the job with Polar. Lisa volunteers for the run, and she and Todd fly to Churchill, Manitoba to get ready for it. Once there, they must put the loads on sledges and haul them 35 miles across the frozen Hudson Bay to reach their destination. Since trucks are not allowed on the ice, they must use caterpillar track machines instead. Todd starts first, taking the excavator and a backup driver, but Lisa has trouble getting used to her machine on the rough, jagged ice as she takes the supplies. When Todd gets stuck on a peninsula's snowy hill, the backup driver uses the excavator to push him and the load over the top. As they move away from the shore, they find that the snow layer is so thick that they cannot accurately measure the ice thickness, but they push on regardless. As the sun sets, they encounter large water flows on the ice and Todd finds himself in danger of breaking through. Mike and Art are taking Polar's last loads of the season to Utik Lake - pontoon boats and building supplies, respectively. A fall of wet snow has covered the road's potholes and melting surfaces, and Art's fast pace adds a further challenge for Mike. Once they make their deliveries, Mike picks up an excavator bucket as a return haul; the lack of weight on his trailer causes it to swing wide on corners, and he slides into a ditch. After several attempts, he winches his truck out using his tow straps and reaches Winnipeg. Darrell fights his way through mud and slush, hauling building supplies to Big Trout Lake. A water-covered ice crossing cracks under his wheels, but he completes the delivery safely.
118	10	"Icy Alliance"	October 18, 2015
On the Hudson Bay, Todd and his backup driver work together to pull his load onto sturdier ice. He and Lisa reach the Seal River and deliver their cargo shortly before sunrise. Darrell races over a muddy trail to deliver a load of sheet rock to Pikangikum before the offload site closes at 4:00 that afternoon. Relying on momentum to carry him over the last, steepest hill, he arrives in time and starts back to Winnipeg. Taking a last-minute load of building supplies to Poplar Hill, Art must contend with a road full of potholes, mud, and slush due to the spring thaw. Remembering his near-breakthrough earlier in the season, he hesitantly ventures onto the season's last open ice crossing. Rough spots and water-filled holes plague him throughout, but he completes the run to close out his season. While hauling cement and a wood-fired boiler to Kingfisher, Alex encounters an oncoming tanker truck at a slippery corner. As the two drivers swerve to avoid a head-on collision, the tanker sideswipes Alex; neither man is injured, and Alex's truck suffers minor damage. His load still secure, he pushes on and finishes the run late that night. Once all the drivers are back in Winnipeg, Mark hosts an end-of-season party for the Polar drivers and Darrell gives Lisa a jacket with their company's name: "Team Lisa & Darrell."

== Returning drivers ==
This season features all the truckers from the prior season with the exceptions of Hugh Rowland, Vlad Pleskot and Reno Ward. Debogorski, Dewey and Burke drive for Polar, while Darrell Ward and Kelly drive for their own company. Barnes appears in episode 8 to help Burke haul a load of fuel.

== New driver ==
- Mike Simmons: Mike is the owner of Bad Apple Escorts, Inc., a pilot truck service based in Edmonton, Alberta. Although he is an experienced heavy hauler on the Alberta oil fields, this season marks his first exposure to ice road trucking. He is hired by Polar to help keep loads moving, in response to the threat of competition posed by Ward and Kelly.

== Route and destinations ==
- Manitoba/Ontario ice roads
- Seal River, via cat train convoy from Churchill: Darrell and Mark teamed up to send their best drivers (Dewey and Kelly) to make this haul over the southwest part of Hudson Bay.
