= Ice Road Truckers season 12 =

Season of television series

Ice Road Truckers
- Season 12
- No. of episodes: 8

Release
- Original network: History
- Original release: October 1 – November 19, 2025

Season chronology
- ← Previous; Season 11

This is a list of Season 12 episodes for Ice Road Truckers. Season 12 premiered October 1, 2025 on the History Channel.

== Episodes ==
No. overall	No. in season	Title	Original release date
139	1	"The Northern Frontier"	October 1, 2025
On their first runs of the new season, Lisa is forced to stop when the unrelenting road knocks her engine apart, and Todd attempts an ambitious bush fix to muscle his load back onto the trailer.
140	2	"The Bet"	October 8, 2025
Lisa’s truck loses all heat as temperatures plummet toward –40, forcing her to seek help from Scooter.
141	3	"Ice and Fire"	October 15, 2025
Todd returns to face an old nemesis that once defeated him and destroyed his truck: Asheweig Road.
142	4	"Enemy Roads"	October 22, 2025
Todd hauls a massive machine as he fights his way home in a final showdown with his nemesis — the infamous Asheweig Road.
143	5	"Game On"	October 29, 2025
Lisa, Scooter and "Muskie Todd" team up as a three-truck convoy to take on the notorious Asheweig Road.
144	6	"Recovery Mission"	November 5, 2025
The Muskie Creek convoy struggles to recover from disaster after an ice bridge collapses beneath Lisa’s truck, tipping her off the road.
145	7	"Last Chance Convoy"	November 12, 2025
Muskie Creek operations manager Bill Danh sends a six-truck convoy — including Lisa, Scooter, and Todd — on a crucial but near-impossible mission to a remote outpost on the Hudson Bay, traveling the world’s longest winter road.
146	8	"End of the Road"	November 19, 2025
Scooter and Muskie Todd split from the convoy and blast deeper into the wilderness, where Scooter’s truck vanishes into a drift left by a recent blizzard.

== Returning drivers ==
Only Todd Dewey and Lisa Kelly return for the series new season, now running for the new company Muskie Creek Ltd. run by Bill Danh. Season 12 was the first season of Ice Road Truckers not to feature Alex Debogorski.

== New drivers ==
- Bill Danh: Operations Manager of Muskie Creek Ltd.
- Scott "Scooter" Yuil: Ice road trucking veteran from Yellowkinfe. Has 2 daughters.
- Shaun Harris: 51 years old, owner of Harris & Sons transportation company, assisted by his sons.
- Zach Harris: 31 years old, Shaun's older son.
- Riley Harris: 21 years old, Shaun's younger son.
- Todd "Muskie Todd" Friesen: Winch truck driver for Muskie Creek.

== Route and destinations ==
- Manitoba/Ontario ice roads
