= Ice Road Truckers season 7 =

Season of television series

Ice Road Truckers
- Season 7
- No. of episodes: 12

Release
- Original network: History
- Original release: June 9 – August 25, 2013

Season chronology
- ← Previous; Season 6 Next → Season 8

This is a list of Ice Road Truckers Season 7 episodes.

The focus of this season is the winter road network originating in Winnipeg.

== Episodes ==
No. overall	No. in season	Title	Original release date
85	1	"Collision Course"	June 9, 2013
In Manitoba, Hugh and former Polar Industries dispatcher Vlad Pleskot have set up a competing trucking company, VP Express. Alex, Lisa, and Darrell sign on with Polar; Hugh voices his belief that Lisa is not suited to drive the Canadian winter roads. All three Polar drivers set out from Winnipeg with construction supplies: Alex and Lisa to Bloodvein, Darrell to Berens River. Darrell slides badly on patches of deep snow, then eases over a river crossing despite his misgivings and brings his load in. Alex and Lisa soon fall out of radio contact with each other and have trouble following the route on their maps. Alex is first to reach Bloodvein, with no sign of Lisa. She eventually arrives as well and the two deliver their cargo. Meanwhile, VP secures a $500,000 contract to haul the entire season's loads to Wasagamack. Hugh, Vlad, and new hire Art Burke (driving Hugh's truck from the first season) set out for their first run, with Art in the lead despite his unfamiliarity with the area. He misses a turn and nearly jackknifes his truck while doubling back, causing a delay in the run and earning a reprimand from Hugh and Vlad. The two veterans complete their run, but Art drops far behind and ends up stuck in a ditch as night falls.
86	2	"Art Attack"	June 16, 2013
A passing grader pulls Art out of the ditch so he can reach Wasagamack and unload with Hugh and Vlad. The next morning, he soon falls behind on the return trip, delaying the group, and starts to worry about his future at VP Express. That night, his truck suddenly stops working and Hugh and Vlad decide not to return for him. Tension grows on both sides as Art spends the night at a rest stop. Polar secures a $100,000 contract to supply the community of Shamattawa, 800 miles away. The road has been the site of many wrecks and breakdowns in the past, and it includes a steep uphill stretch past the crossing over the Hayes River. Darrell starts the run ahead of Alex and Lisa, all three hauling construction supplies. After Darrell crosses the Hayes, he spins out on the slope and is forced to back up onto the ice so he can try again. Once he reaches the top, he continues on and reaches Shamattawa that night. Lisa's old wrist fracture from motocross racing flares up, causing her discomfort due to frequent gear shifts. She spins out on a hill, but manages to climb it despite the pain. That night, she and Alex come to the Hayes; Alex crosses first without incident, but Lisa also spins out on the slope and puts on extra tire chains in order to get the needed traction. She and Alex then continue their run.
87	3	"Fear the Crack"	June 23, 2013
Darrell, coming south from Shamattawa, pulls in at the rest stop and helps Art get his truck going so he can return to Winnipeg. The next morning, Hugh and Vlad hire logging trucker Todd Dewey to help keep the loads moving. They decide to give Art one more chance to prove himself, as part of a convoy with Hugh and Todd to haul assorted supplies to Wasagamack. Todd's aggressive driving leads Hugh to believe that he will be a better convoy leader than Art as the drivers bring in their loads. Meanwhile, Alex and Lisa reach Shamattawa and deliver their loads. For the return trip, Alex picks up a forklift bound for repairs in Winnipeg. Lisa hurries south, ready for another load, and pulls in that night. Driving more slowly because of his load, a fatigued Alex arrives several hours later; the forklift delivery secures another set of Shamattawa-bound loads for Polar. As more winter roads are opened to traffic, Polar picks up a contract to supply Little Grand Rapids and Darrell gets its first load - concrete construction barriers. As he drives north, he comes across a long-abandoned pickup truck blocking the road and pulls it loose. That night, he comes to an untested lake crossing and successfully traverses it finish his run. Once all three drivers are back in Winnipeg, they pull up briefly in front of the VP yard the next morning as a show of defiance before starting up the road.
88	4	"Ice Rodeo"	June 30, 2013
As Hugh, Art, and Todd head back to Winnipeg, Hugh's heater and Art's truck both stop working. Todd persuades Art to leave the truck on the roadside and takes him as far as Norway House to wait for Vlad to pick him up. Art and Todd both voice their frustrations over their bosses' perceived lack of concern for their well-being, and Hugh begins to think about firing Art. Vlad takes Art back to the truck that evening; they have no success trying to repair it or pull it loose, so Vlad decides the next day to take Art to Wasagamack and fly him back to Winnipeg. Lisa sets out along the newly opened, slick, bumpy road to Oxford House, hauling a grader whose blade keeps swinging out over the side of her trailer. Reaching a narrow bridge, she ties the blade back as best she can and eases across without damage. That night, she begins to skid down a hill in high gear and finds herself at an unexpected river crossing; she gets her speed under control and crosses safely. The next morning, she discovers a leaky air valve, but changes it out so she can bring in the load and start back to Winnipeg. Heading to Pauingassi along another newly opened road, Darrell briefly gets stuck in a snowbank, but uses a nearby tree to winch himself loose. When he arrives, he finds the truck frozen in the snow and no ramp available to load it onto his trailer. He bulldozes some snow to create a makeshift ramp and winches up the truck, which nearly falls off the trailer until he pushes it back into place. He brings the truck to Winnipeg, irritated at the Pauingassi yard crew's lack of preparation to help load it.
89	5	"World War Hugh"	July 7, 2013
Hugh sets out early for Wasagamack with a load of bridge parts, wanting to make up for lost time on VP's contract. The brakes on his trailer fail soon after starting out, and he wrestles with the steering to keep the truck from skidding off the road on turns. Pushing through a road roughened by fresh snowfall, he brings his cargo in that night. Art is back in Winnipeg, waiting on truck repairs and expressing regrets about signing on with VP. When Todd reports in, he becomes angry at being left behind by Hugh and has to start his run alone, hauling a bulldozer. He and Lisa reach an ice crossing from opposite directions at nearly the same time, and he crosses first in an attempt to catch up with Hugh. Lisa, bringing a school bus back to Winnipeg, is very nervous about crossing so soon after him due to the stress on the ice, but eases safely over the river to finish her run. Todd's heater fails, causing frost to build up on the windows, but he sets up a hair dryer to thaw them out and keeps driving to reach Wasagamack not long after Hugh. At Polar, Alex and Darrell are dispatched to start hauling the parts of a modular water treatment plant to a construction site in Gillam, 700 miles away. The final stretch of the road they must take is not maintained and has been the site of several past wrecks and fatalities. Darrell starts his run immediately, but Alex has to wait a day until his fuel tank is repaired. He hurries up the road, breaks a spring on the final stretch, and brings his module in one day after Darrell, reaching the site just before closing time.
90	6	"Hail to the King!"	July 14, 2013
As VP lines up more contracts, Vlad gives Art one last chance to show his ability as part of a convoy to Tadoule Lake with Todd and a free-lance driver, Derek. Todd, hauling a trailer-load of supplies, loses electrical power and calls the convoy to a stop. One of his batteries shorts out and bursts as he checks its connections. The explosion sends sulfuric acid into Todd's and Derek's faces; to get medical attention, the convoy must backtrack 80 miles to Lynn Lake. As Derek is treated for chemical burns, Todd is checked out and released, then finds that his problems were caused by a faulty alternator. Yuri, one of Polar's drivers, quits to join VP and Lisa gets his load: building supplies that must reach Bloodvein by the end of the day. On Hugh's orders, Yuri parks his truck in front of the Polar freight yard to block outgoing trucks. When he refuses to move, the police are called in to escort him off the property; the delay costs Lisa two hours and forces her to hurry up the road. She loses more time stopping at a blasting zone, but reaches the drop-off point just in time to deliver her load and pick up another one bound for Winnipeg. Alex gets a speeding ticket while hauling the last load on the Shamattawa contract, hoping to meet the following morning's deadline. That night, he develops engine trouble and finds an electrical fire behind his dashboard. Meanwhile, 800 miles north of Winnipeg, self-proclaimed "King of Obsolete" Joey Barnes has been hired to salvage a generator from an abandoned campsite. He and his assistant Jonathan use old, modified Caterpillar tractors to drive the off-road terrain, and his daughter Xena travels with them on a snowmobile. The group crosses a lake with 60 tons of combined vehicle weight, cracking the ice on the far side, and picks up the generator for the return trip.
91	7	"Load Rules"	July 21, 2013
On the way to Shamattawa, Alex finds that his electrical fire has gone out, but it has melted an air line behind the dashboard. He clamps off the leak and spends the night in the smoky truck, then continues on the next day and brings in his load to close out the contract. Darrell hauls a load of cement to Oxford House, his trailer skidding badly behind him. When he arrives, though, he discovers that an expected return load is not there, greatly lowering his opinion of Polar's management. Lisa is on her way to Pauingassi to pick up a load, following a road that includes the first lake crossing of her career, over Fishing Lake. She begins to wonder if she is following the correct path on the ice, only to become more confused when she stops to check the area. She gets safely off the ice and reaches town, but has to dig out the snow around the trailer she needs to haul back. After several hours of work, she successfully drags it out and starts back to Winnipeg. With Todd's truck fixed, he, Art, and Todd resume their trip to Tadoule Lake. All three find their return loads (a cement truck for Todd, trailers for Art and Derek) stuck in deep snow. Art and Todd hitch up to their trailers and pull them loose after digging out the wheels, while Todd borrows a tractor to help load up the cement truck. As they head toward Winnipeg, Art's anger toward Hugh and Vlad as well as his dissatisfaction with VP intensifies. Joey brings an old Ford big rig out of storage to haul lumber to Lac Brochet, 200 miles away, with Jonathan taking a load of his own. The road has many weak spots where water flows up onto the ice, and the two break partway through one of them on a slushy stretch. Maneuvering to take advantage of loose snow and keep traction on slick hills, they finish the run safely.
92	8	"Art of War"	July 28, 2013
Lisa heads toward Pauingassi to pick up a second trailer that has been stuck there since the previous year. Arriving that night, she finds the trailer's latch frozen solid and the tires stuck in ice, but it comes free after some effort. The ice over Fishing Lake has weakened due to higher-than-normal temperatures, putting her nerves on edge as she crosses it on the return trip to reach Winnipeg. Hugh is on the way back to Winnipeg after delivering a load. Art, not far behind him, is still very irritated over the difficulties he has encountered. At the VP office, he meets with Hugh and Vlad to express his dissatisfaction, a talk that ends with the two owners firing him. He stops by the Polar office and is immediately hired. As Darrell waits for a broken axle to be repaired on his truck, he gets into an argument with the Polar mechanic. He then meets with company owner Mark Kohaykewych to talk about his workload and expectations, and calms down when Mark tells him about upcoming high-value loads. Soon afterward, he is dispatched to pull a jackknifed truck out of a ditch so that it no longer blocks the road. Alex travels the newly opened Lake Winnipeg ice crossing in order to pick up a cement plant. On the return trip, he becomes the season's first driver to haul a load over the ice. He gets his wheels caught on the pressure ridge in the middle, where two ice sheets join, but manages to push over it and complete his drive to Winnipeg.
93	9	"Haul of the Wild"	August 4, 2013
Polar picks up a contract to haul 10 loads of construction supplies 680 miles to Utik Lake, over a road that is not monitored by government crews. Darrell is first to start out, but his engine begins to overheat and he must shut down his truck to check his cooling fan. He manages to get the truck restarted despite the falling temperature and continues his run. The final stretch includes a risky lake crossing for which his truck is too heavy, so he lightens his load in order to cross safely. Alex and Art are dispatched to follow Darrell, with Alex taking a camping trailer to Oxford House first. Once they arrive, he drops off the camper and picks up a loader bucket, attaching several heavy tires to his trailer in order to drag over the road and smooth the surface. They get stuck in a dead end with no room to turn around, but Art calls in a nearby loader to clear the area so they can double back and keep driving. That night, word reaches them about the thin lake ice; with no one to help, they have to take their full loads onto the crossing. The ice holds and they deliver their cargo, with Alex expressing his approval of Art's driving. Hugh and Todd are hauling construction supplies to St. Theresa Point; Hugh gets his truck briefly stuck in a ditch and needs Todd to pull him free. Once they bring their loads in, Todd picks up a gravel truck bound for Winnipeg and the two start back. Lisa, driving the same route to deliver a fire engine, twice comes across jackknifed trucks blocking the road and helps to pull them loose. Hugh and Todd get caught in the traffic backup during the second incident, and Hugh suggests that Lisa think about working for VP instead of Polar in the future. She finishes the run the following morning and begins to ponder the offer.
94	10	"Jagged Little Hill"	August 11, 2013
As spring approaches in Manitoba, both VP and Polar scramble to move needed freight before the ice roads melt. Lisa picks up a rock truck needed in Utik Lake, her heaviest load of the season. The sound of shifting ice sets her nerves on edge as she crosses the lake late that night to make the delivery. In Oxford House, Alex heads out to pick up his next load, leaving Art to take a snowcat to Utik Lake alone. Art's truck will not start, but he manages to get it going by cleaning out a blocked filter. He loses power on a hill the next day, but another cleanout allows him to complete the run. Todd takes on an excavator bound for Wasagamack, his heaviest load of the season. Before he reaches the ice road, though, its weight causes two tires on one trailer axle to blow out; he chains the axle so he can backtrack to the nearest repair shop, 100 miles away. He loses one day waiting for new tires and drives late into the night to make up time, making a risky ice crossing to bring in his load. Darrell is dispatched on a night run to free a jackknifed Polar truck that is blocking the road. The task proves very dangerous, since the other driver has been taken to the hospital and he must manipulate both trucks and his winch by himself. He pulls the truck free after several maneuvers, then takes on its load (a rock truck) and delivers it to Utik Lake late that night. The next morning, he wakes up feeling ill and finds several broken tire chains, complicating the start of his return to Winnipeg. Hauling a stack of two empty trailers, he loses traction and power on a hill but manages to pull them over the top. He limps back to Winnipeg, believing that his season may be over if repairs take too long. Meanwhile, Joey and Jonathan start a 200-mile run to deliver building supplies to Lac Brochet. Water holes under the thinning ice force Joey to drive carefully, and the weight of his passage cracks one spot badly enough to make Jonathan's wheels sink into it. Joey pulls the truck clear of the break, and they bring their loads in on schedule.
95	11	"The Wrecking Crew"	August 18, 2013
Hugh takes a firetruck north toward Wasagamack, but not before he and Vlad park it in front of the Polar depot with sirens blaring to annoy Mark. He decides to drive the truck instead of hauling it on a trailer. That night, he pulls Todd over as a prank; Todd is hauling a light load back to Winnipeg, fighting for traction and pulling a truck out of a ditch along the way. Hugh and Todd both bring in their cargo. Polar secures a contract to haul a wide-load modular building from Red Sucker Lake to Thompson. Darrell's truck is back in service, and he is dispatched to move it, with Lisa taking support scaffolding and a pilot car to guide them along the narrow road. A bent wheel rim leads to a flat tire for Darrell, but he hammers it back into shape and reinflates the tire to keep going. He damages the building's air conditioning unit on a bridge barely wide enough for the load. Later, when his truck suffers a partial power loss, he and Lisa trade loads so he can haul the lighter one. The next day, they bring the loads in and use the pilot car to help unload the building, completing the delivery. Art, also on his way back to Winnipeg, develops engine trouble again as he eases onto a weakened lake crossing. He is soon forced to stop, putting himself at great risk of breaking through, but an emergency fuel filter repair allows him to get moving again. When the engine again struggles and dies, he finds that an electrical cable has broken. Unable to drive, he starts a fire to keep warm and waits for help from a passing driver. After nearly a full day with no luck, he improvises a repair job and reaches Oxford House so he can have it properly fixed. Meanwhile, Alex is bringing a construction trailer back to Winnipeg. Coming off a slick downhill run, he hits a sharp curve and slides into a snowbank, blocking the road. Another driver in the area pulls him free so he can finish his run.
96	12	"Winter Takes All"	August 25, 2013
The road to the village of God's Lake is opened for 48 hours to allow drivers to bring in supplies. Both VP and Polar pick up loads--appliances (Art), building materials (Alex), cement (Darrell and Lisa), cement trucks (Hugh and Todd). Once Hugh and Todd finish the season's last runs to Wasagamack, they load up and start for God's Lake, driving into the night to save time. Both struggle to get over a slick hill and must then carefully cross Island Lake with their heavy loads. They reach God's Lake the next morning and head south, intending to get off the roads before they close. Art, the first to bring in his cargo, picks up the only load bound for Winnipeg: canisters of flammable propane gas. Darrell and Lisa find many melting patches on the road as they drive and skid badly on corners, but reach God's Lake at night. All three hurry back down the road, with Art trying not to jostle the canisters. After Alex finishes his run, he skids badly on the return trip and ends up jackknifing and damaging his truck. A passing driver helps him pull the truck and trailer separately back onto the road so he can hook them back up and limp back to Winnipeg. Back in Winnipeg, Darrell meets with Mark, who offers him an opportunity to return to Polar next season and pays him a bonus for his work. Alex's truck proves to be so badly damaged that it must be written off as a total loss, but Mark is relieved that no one was hurt and the loads were delivered. Art's final delivery gives Polar the edge in the final load count, topping VP 181-180, and the employees gather for a celebratory meal in the garage. The VP employees have a party of their own at a snowmobile racetrack, with Hugh commenting that the company has already begun to line up contracts for the next season.

== Returning drivers ==
Debogorski, Kelly, and Ward relocate to Winnipeg this season and begin driving for Polar Industries. Rowland and Pleskot return as well, leaving Polar to start their own trucking company, VP Express.

== New drivers ==
- Art Burke: Burke, a Yellowknife resident, has driven the diamond mine ice roads for 15 years. He originally signs on with VP Express to drive for Rowland but switches over to Polar, after being fired. He also brings the winning load for Polar by the end of the season.
- Todd Dewey: Dewey, a logging trucker from Washington state, started his first year on the ice road to work for Rowland. He is also featured in Ax Men season 8, especially driving logs for Rygaard Logging into the saw mill during the warmer months. Dewey is the nephew of Craig Rygaard and cousin of Gabe, Jason, and Burt. Craig is the original owner of Rygaard Logging, and when he retired, Gabe took over.
- Joey Barnes: Barnes, known as the "King of Obsolete", and his daughter Xena live in northern Manitoba, well past the end of the winter roads. He uses vintage trucks and modified tractors to travel over the rough terrain for equipment delivery/pickup runs.

== Final load counts ==
- Polar – 181
- VP – 180
