= Ice Road Truckers season 11 =

Season of television series

Ice Road Truckers
- Season 11
- No. of episodes: 10

Release
- Original network: History
- Original release: August 24 – November 9, 2017

Season chronology
- ← Previous; Season 10 Next → Season 12

This is a list of Season 11 episodes for Ice Road Truckers. Season 11 premiered August 24, 2017 on History.

== Episodes ==
No. overall	No. in season	Title	Original release date
129	1	"The Ice Is Right "	August 24, 2017
After two consecutive short winters, a huge backlog of undelivered loads has built up. Following Darrell's death, Lisa resolves to lead their company by herself as best she can and starts a run to Tadoule Lake with a load of construction supplies. A valve freezes open, causing her to lose air pressure, but she applies heat to loosen and close it so she can keep driving. Later that night, she skids badly on a series of curves and jackknifes her truck to end up stuck in a ditch. Todd, reflecting on the deaths of both Darrell and his cousin Gabe Rygaard (see Ax Men), sets out for Oxford House with a loader on a low trailer. A slick uphill run threatens to overturn his load if the trailer hits the ground, but he reaches the top with almost no room to spare and continues on. Once he reaches his goal, he picks up a loader needed for repairs in Winnipeg and starts south. Mark sends Steph to pick up a trailer in Poplar Hill that was abandoned during the previous winter. The trip is marked by a lengthy struggle to chain her tires, then the discovery that she has very little room to maneuver in the freight yard after hooking up to the trailer. She runs briefly into a snowbank, but manages to pull free and heads back to Winnipeg. Taking construction supplies to Garden Hill, Art chooses to follow a just-opened road that is shorter than the one Mark wants him to use. That night, he faces a newly frozen ice crossing and loses traction while climbing a steep hill on its far shore. He has no choice but to back up onto the ice and accelerate for a second try; the risky move works, and he delivers his load.
130	2	"Jackknife Jeopardy "	August 31, 2017
Unable to move due to a stuck clutch, Lisa has to spend the night in her truck. The next morning, she finds that the angle of the jackknifed trailer prevents her from reaching her tool kit. After 14 hours of being stuck, a passing group of hunters does a temporary repair job to get her moving, but the clutch is out of alignment and needs further work. Once she limps into Tadoule Lake, she ponders what to do in order to keep the loads moving and her company afloat. That same morning, Todd starts a run to Round Lake with a load of construction supplies. He stops to pull a stranded truck out of a snowbank, but the effort leaves him with broken tire chains. He is forced to negotiate a steep downhill/uphill combination without their traction boost and relies on momentum to make it through to town. Alex starts his season's first run to Pauingassi, hauling construction supplies and furnaces. While checking a creek ice crossing, he breaks through and sinks up to his knees. Later, the appearance of the ice on a 10-mile lake crossing worries him, indicating that the water level may have receded enough to leave the ice with no support. However, he crosses safely and finishes the run. While in Big Trout Lake, Steph gets a call from Mark to take a trailer to the Polar repair shop in Pickle Lake. That night, she finds herself on a twisting, narrow path and spins out on a slick uphill run, causing a traffic backup. She quickly chains her tires and is able to reach the top, arriving at the shop the next morning.
131	3	"Helter Melter "	September 7, 2017
On his way to Tadoule Lake with a load of construction supplies, Art finds that unusually high temperatures have left the roads slick and slushy. He stops to pull a car out of a ditch, then drives into the night along a twisting road only to find the path blocked by several trucks. A section of its ice covering has collapsed, and no traffic can go through until it has been repaired. The next morning, he pushes through a road awash in melt water and brings in his load. After nursing her truck back to Winnipeg, Lisa discovers that it needs extensive repairs. Mark loans her the money to get it fixed, a debt she must work off by delivering loads for Polar. While taking groceries to Island Lake, she spins out on a steep hill but reaches the top on her second try. That night, she finds a stopped truck blocking her path; the driver thinks the hill up ahead is too icy to climb, but she muscles the rig to the peak so both of them can keep moving and finishes her run the next day. Meanwhile, Alex discovers footprints on the road as he takes an emergency load of groceries to Shamattawa. They lead to a man suffering from frostbite, who accepts Alex's offer of a ride. He rolls onto the final lake crossing without testing it and reaches town to bring in his cargo and passenger. Todd fights his way along a narrow, rough trail and across an uncertain lake crossing to deliver a load of construction supplies to Muskrat Dam.
132	4	"Meltdown Blues "	September 14, 2017
After three warm days that have closed all the roads and left truckers stranded, a nighttime cold snap allows them to start moving loads again. Steph is the first to start off for Summer Beaver, with a load of housing supplies. She loses control on a slick patch and runs into a snowbank; after 13 hours of digging out her tires and trying to move, she manages to break loose and resumes her trip. The next morning, she pulls into town and drops off her load. As Todd takes roofing shingles from Pickle Lake to Muskrat Dam, the light load causes him to lose traction and slide badly on the new ice. He decides to drive more slowly and save wear and tear on the truck. Art is also heading to Muskrat Dam with construction supplies, but he chafes at having to follow a pair of very slow tanker trucks until they stop to let him pass. He speeds along, but later finds himself behind Todd and has no choice but to slow down as well. That night, they come to a badly battered lake crossing and start onto it separately. The ice cracks and pops loudly even under the reduced weight of their loads, but they reach the far shore safely and complete their deliveries. While hauling supplies to an RCMP post in Shamattawa, Lisa must drive down a steep slope and directly onto the ice of a lake crossing. Once she delivers the load, she hurries back to Winnipeg in order to continue paying off her debt to Mark.
133	5	"The Son Rises "	October 5, 2017
Art's plan to take a load of building supplies to Pauingassi runs into trouble when his truck's engine unexpectedly quits barely a mile into the trip. Once it is repaired, he hurries to make up for the delay, only to encounter a sudden blizzard that closes the roads all over Manitoba. Once they reopen a day later, he resumes his trip and finds a badly deteriorated lake crossing. He waits until nightfall to attempt it, hoping that the temperature drop will re-freeze some of the ice; the surface cracks badly under his wheels, but he reaches shore safely and pushes on to reach his goal the next morning. Lisa and Mark call in Darrell's son Reno to help move an oversized pre-fabricated house and additional supplies for it to North Caribou Lake. With Lisa and Reno driving the trucks, and Mark in a pilot vehicle, the three set out only to be stopped by the blizzard. The next day, they come to a narrow bridge that leaves only inches to spare on either side of Lisa's trailer as Mark guides her across. Later, they come to a second bridge at a low point between two hills; Mark leads Reno across first, and Lisa uses their comments on speed and handling to make her run. In Pickle Lake, Steph picks up a load of building supplies bound for Big Trout Lake. When the pallets start to shift markedly on her trailer, she uses spare straps and chains to hold them down before continuing. She reaches town that night with the load intact.
134	6	"A Bridge Too Far"	October 12, 2017
Lisa successfully crosses the narrow bridge, and the convoy pushes on in hopes of reaching North Caribou Lake by the end of the night. When she loses traction on a steep uphill run, Reno has to ease carefully past her so he can hook up tow chains and pull her over the top, but he breaks his bumper in the process. Both of them and Mark blow their horns as a salute to Darrell before delivering the house and supplies. Todd sets out from Thompson, Manitoba for Shamattawa, whose road has just reopened after a three-day blizzard, to deliver an overdue load. That night, he eases down one hill only to find an equally steep uphill slope after it that causes him to slide back down. By backing up onto the first hill, he builds up just enough momentum to reach the top; the next morning, he pulls into town to finish the run. While hauling a load to Little Grand Rapids, Alex stops to help a trucker whose brakes have locked up. The assistance costs him six hours, and he hurries to make up time and meet his delivery deadline. The final ice crossing is in poor shape when he reaches it well after nightfall, and he reaches the village with little time to spare. On the return trip to Manitoba, his truck slides badly on the ice and goes into a ditch. On a run to deliver building supplies to Sachigo Lake, Art encounters an oncoming truck as he negotiates a 21-mile lake crossing. The combined weight puts both at risk of breaking the ice, but they ease past one another and Art reaches shore to bring in his load.
135	7	"Of Ice and Men"	October 19, 2017
When Alex is unable to get his truck out of the ditch on his own, a couple of drivers in a passing pickup pull him back onto the road. Upon reaching Pikangikum, he picks up a construction shack bound for Red Lake, Ontario as part of a new Polar contract, but wonders if it is too long or wide for the area's roads. That night, he goes into a ditch while trying to negotiate a tight corner; after digging out his tires, he manages to back out and finish the run. Art heads for Deer Lake, carrying a Zamboni machine. On the final leg of the trip, he encounters a slick uphill run that causes him to spin out and slide backwards into a ditch. After chaining his tires, he resorts to climbing the hill in idle on order to get the needed torque and reaches the top. He delivers the Zamboni the next morning, but its engine will not start and the residents set up a ramp and loader to pull it off the truck. The rear end scrapes the ground as it is being unloaded, but the machine still works properly once the engine is started. While hauling a load of lumber to Big Trout Lake, Reno swerves to avoid an oncoming pickup, but sideswipes it and runs into a ditch. He cannot get free on his own, but Lisa happens to be in radio range and agrees to stop and help. While trying to pull him loose, she rips the front bumper clean off of her own truck; with no other ideas, she continues her haul of construction supplies to Kasabonika Lake First Nation and promises to send help. The next morning, a road maintenance crew arrives with a loader to clear the snow and get Reno moving again. Both he and Lisa finish their runs safely.
136	8	"The Big Skid"	October 26, 2017
Alex sets off from Pikangikum with a kitchen shack in tow, bound for Red Lake. He pulls it on a steel sleigh in order to distribute its weight more evenly across the melting ice of a lake crossing, then moves it onto a trailer once he reaches the opposite shore. The strain of pulling the load causes his engine to overheat; he stops to add antifreeze, then cautiously drives the final stretch to finish his run. Steph leaves Pikangikum for Winnipeg with a load of water tanks. By the time she reaches the same lake crossing, it is in even worse shape, with cracks and water everywhere. She tentatively eases across it to the opposite shore and continues her trip. In Pickle Lake, Art picks up a load of construction supplies bound for Kasabonika. A hard bump knocks his truck's mounting bracket loose, punching a hole in his radiator, causing an antifreeze leak that he cannot immediately repair. He resecures the broken bracket using zip-ties and tops up the reservoir and drives on, hoping to finish the run before his engine overheats. The next day, he skids into a ditch, but gets back on the road after shutting off his engine so it can cool down and provide the needed power, then makes his delivery and has his truck repaired. While taking groceries to Garden Hill, Todd gets stuck at a tight corner on the worn, slick road. He improvises a pulley system using trees and tow chains/straps and pulls himself free, then delivers the load later that day.
137	9	"Double Trouble"	November 2, 2017
As rising temperatures send the ice road season into its final days, Lisa and Steph hurry toward Bearskin Lake First Nation with loads of construction supplies and trusses, respectively. That night, Lisa finds Steph stopped by the roadside and re-securing her load, and the two decide to finish their run together. The next morning, they are forced to stop when smoke starts to billow from Lisa's cab, the result of an electrical fire caused by a defective fuse. They continue their run after replacing it and airing out the cab, but Steph skids into a ditch. In Winnipeg, Art gears up for his last run of the season, making two stops to deliver a half-load each to North Spirit Lake and Deer Lake. The first leg of his trip is marked by a lake crossing filled with weak spots, and he finishes the second without incident; on the way back to Winnipeg, though, Mark dispatches him to pick up a bulldozer in Pikangikum. Much to Art's displeasure. Todd picks up an oversized camp shack for a run from Pickle Lake to Big Trout Lake. As he tries to ease past two oncoming trucks, all three drivers lose traction on the loose snow. After digging one driver's wheels out so he can pull the second one free, Todd maneuvers back to the center of the road and continues his trip. A spin-out on a hill forces him to back up for a second run, taking the risk that his trailer will pull him off the road; he reaches the top and drives on through the night to deliver the load the next morning.
138	10	"One Last Lick"	November 9, 2017
After seeing how far Steph has gone off the road, Lisa leaves to continue her run and find help. Once she delivers her load in Bearskin Lake, she sends back a crew with a loader and grader to pull Steph loose. Their first attempt fails, but a suggestion from Steph proves to be the key to getting her back on the road so she can finish the run. Hauling the bulldozer puts Art at risk of bogging down in the thawing muskeg of the winter road. As he traverses a lake crossing covered with slush and open water, his wheels catch on holes and break through the surface layers of ice, but he reaches shore safely and bring his cargo to Pikangikum. While taking one last load of construction supplies from Pickle Lake to Kasabonika, Todd loses traction on an uphill slope and starts to slide back. He manages to stop just short of an embankment, then tops the hill with a combination of tire chains and speed and completes the delivery to close out his season. Hauling construction supplies to Big Trout Lake, Reno starts to lose air pressure to his brakes in the middle of a lake crossing at night. He is forced to stop on the ice when the emergency brakes engage automatically; after shutting off his engine, he finds a valve that has frozen open and closes it, allowing him to get moving again and make his delivery. Mark learns of a disabled trailer on the road to Muskrat Dam and asks Lisa to investigate. As she improvises a repair to its compressed air system, a crew arrives to offload some of the cargo and help her get the trailer moving back to Winnipeg.

== Returning drivers ==
Debogorski, Dewey, Burke and Custance continue driving for Polar, and Lisa continues to run the company she and Darrell Ward founded. Darrell's son Reno Ward (Season 8) joins the cast in episode 5, helping Lisa repay a debt to Polar owner Mark Kohaykewych. Mark also drives a pilot car for an oversized load hauled by Lisa and Reno (episodes 5 and 6).

== Route and destinations ==
- Manitoba/Ontario ice roads: One new destination added in Season 11: Kasabonika, Ontario.
