= Ice Road Truckers season 10 =

Season of television series

Ice Road Truckers
- Season 10
- No. of episodes: 10

Release
- Original network: History
- Original release: August 4 – October 6, 2016

Season chronology
- ← Previous; Season 9 Next → Season 11

This is a list of Ice Road Truckers Season 10 episodes. Per the History Channel website, Season 10 (which the site calls Season X or "IRT X") premiered on August 4, 2016 at 10/9c.

== Episodes ==
Darrell Ward was killed in a small plane crash on August 28, 2016. All of this season's episode broadcasts in Canada, and all those in the United States from #5 on (as are rebroadcasts of the first four) are dedicated to his memory.

| No. overall | No. in season | Title | Original release date |
|---|---|---|---|
| 119 | 1 | "Against All Odds" | August 4, 2016 |
High winter temperatures due to El Niño have greatly shortened the year's ice road season and left the routes in even worse shape than normal. Mark has a backlog of freight in the Polar yard, while Darrell and Lisa hunt for loads they can take over accessible routes. Todd is first to head out, taking building supplies to Pikangikum along a just-opened road with a 10-mile ice crossing. He feels the ice flex and crack under his truck's weight, but it holds up as he brings in the load. When the road to Wasagamack opens, Art hauls a load of lumber but soon finds that the rough terrain is causing it to shift on his trailer. His only spare strap proves too short to tie it down, so he clamps it with a set of vise grips and resumes his trip. The improvised repair job holds all the way to his destination, but a hard bump on the return trip sends him bouncing into a snowdrift. Darrell sets out for Garden Hill with urgently needed food and medical supplies, but barely misses an oncoming truck on a blind corner. He pushes through a slick final stretch caused by the mounting sun and delivers the load. As Lisa takes a loader to Garden Hill, she spins out on a steep uphill run and must rely on her tire chains and speed to top it. She arrives safely that evening to drop off the equipment.
| 120 | 2 | "Feeling the Heat" | August 11, 2016 |
After several hours of trying unsuccessfully to free himself from the snowbank, Art discovers that he has a flat tire. Unable to fix it himself, he has no choice but to wait and hope someone comes by to help. That night, a passing road crew pulls him free with a loader; however, one of his front wheel rims is badly bent. They remove it and mount a tire from the left side of the truck's middle axle in its place and he continues back toward Winnipeg. While hauling a load of heating fuel to Little Grand Rapids, Alex encounters an ice crossing that has mostly been blocked off due to potential hazards. He stands in the doorway of his cab to scout for danger and spots several water flows on the ice, but finishes the crossing and completes the run. As Mark scrambles to get more loads out as quickly as possible, recently licensed driver Steph Custance visits the Polar offices looking for a job. Mark needs drivers, but hesitates on immediately hiring her after she turns in a shaky performance on a practice course in the yard. Todd's truck begins to lose power during a run to North Spirit Lake First Nation with building supplies. Darrell, bound for the same location with a light load of tanks, finds him on the road and switches loads with him so they can both keep moving and deliver their cargo. After completing a delivery of building supplies to Poplar Hill, Lisa hurries back toward Winnipeg in order to take advantage of the road conditions. That night, though, heavy snowfall causes her to spin out on a steep hill. While backing down for another attempt, she slides into a ditch, blocking the road until a pickup truck comes through to pull her loose. Able to top the hill, she continues her return trip.
| 121 | 3 | "Breakdown" | August 18, 2016 |
While hauling construction supplies to Pikangikum, Darrell learns that a stretch of the route has been closed due to high temperatures and pulls over to wait until it reopens. Not wanting to leave the village empty-handed, he turns onto a narrow private road that includes an untested 3-mile lake crossing, and reaches the village safely. On the way to St. Theresa Point with construction supplies, Art gets word from a passing trucker that the road is in bad shape. The sight of a snowplow half-buried in frozen mud prompts him to contemplate the hazards of his trip, but he pushes on into the night. He has to stop at an ice crossing that is being flooded by road crews to increase its thickness. The next morning, he estimates that his truck's weight is very close to the safety limit and risks the crossing; a passing pickup near the shore throws a scare into him, but he makes it off the ice and completes the run. Lisa hurries from Garden Hill toward Winnipeg with a loader, but engine trouble forces her to pull over and shut off her truck so she can check the fluid levels. She tops up the oil, but is unable to restart the engine; however, she uses the downhill terrain and the weight of her load to push-start the truck and get moving again. In Winnipeg, Mark has Steph drive the local roads as a final test, then decides to take one more night to consider hiring her. The following morning, he offers her the job and she accepts.
| 122 | 4 | "Trial by Ice" | August 25, 2016 |
Darrell and Lisa take on their longest haul to date, driving over 1,000 miles along a trail nicknamed "The Death Road" to deliver heating supplies to Fort Chipewyan, Alberta. Lisa's engine begins to leak oil into its coolant system; unable to fix it on the spot, she and Darrell push on in the hope that they can finish the run before the truck becomes undrivable. They manage to limp into town, delivering the cargo and dropping off Lisa's truck for repairs. For Steph's first ice road run, she and Todd head to Shamattawa as a convoy to pick up two abandoned trailers from the previous year. Todd is surprised and dismayed to learn that she does not know how to put on tire chains, but gives her a quick lesson so they can keep moving. News of a truck having broken through one of the road's ice crossings sets Steph's nerves on edge, but she and Todd avoid the damaged area and reach land safely. They reach a second crossing that night but find it closed, forcing them to spend the night on the roadside. On his way to Sachigo Lake with building supplies, Art finds himself faced with a choice of two paths. He chooses the shorter one, which includes the ice crossing he nearly broke through late in the previous season. Though he becomes very nervous on the approach to that spot, he makes it across without incident this time and delivers the load.
| 123 | 5 | "The Rookie" | September 1, 2016 |
The crossing on the road to Shamattawa is reopened after a night's wait, and Todd and Steph get moving in order to reduce their chance of being caught by another shutdown. After making it off the ice and into town, they must dig out the tires of the two abandoned trailers and then try to pull them free of the snow and ice. One is stuck in place, stumping Todd and Steph until they knock its frozen brakes loose from the wheels. As they move from the winter road onto pavement for the drive into Manitoba that night, Steph thanks Todd for helping her complete her first ice road trip. Darrell sets out with a load of heating oil bound for Elk Island Lodge, following a privately owned road that crews do not maintain. As night falls, he comes to a 4-mile ice crossing that appears never to have been used or monitored for thickness. He ventures cautiously onto it, alarmed at the severe cracking under his wheels that indicates dangerously thin ice, and reaches the lodge safely to drop off the cargo. Alex is dispatched to St. Theresa Point with a load of building supplies that must arrive by 9:00 the next morning. As he reaches the start of the winter road, however, he finds that the route he needs to take is closed due to high temperatures. After waiting more than 10 hours, he gets word from Mark that the road has been reopened; driving through the night, he reaches his destination with eight minutes to spare. Mark sets up a new contract with the community of Summer Beaver, Ontario and sends Art out for the first trip at the residents' request, hauling a trailer of food. After veering into the soft snow on one side of the narrow trail and briefly getting stuck, he decides to keep to the middle of the road, only to have a near miss with an oncoming truck on a blind curve. He brings the load in and gets a warm reception from the residents.
| 124 | 6 | "Bridge to Nowhere" | September 8, 2016 |
A cold front has allowed more roads to open for a short time, and the truckers scramble to deliver loads to isolated communities before they close again. Darrell hauls a load of insulation toward Cat Lake, following a narrow, twisting trail filled with hazards. After spinning out on a steep hill, he chains his tires and manages to get enough traction to reach the top and deliver the cargo. Alex picks up an oversized fuel tank needed in Norway House that night, but the road's poor condition threatens to shake it off his trailer. The final hurdle is an ice crossing that shows signs of beginning to thaw, and he proceeds with great caution, standing on the steps of his cab as he notices open water flows on the surface. Despite nearly falling out of the truck, he keeps control and reaches town safely. As Art takes building supplies toward Pauingassi, he comes across a truck that has slid into the ditch at an angle, blocking the road. He pulls it free, breaking a tow chain in the process, and drives well into the night to make up as much time as he can. He finds himself driving on an unmarked, melting ice crossing, reaches the opposite shore just as abruptly, and finishes the run the next morning. Todd completes a delivery to Muskrat Dam, then hurries to return to Winnipeg before the road closes. An ice bridge over a ditch is piled high with loose snow and debris; he tries to muscle across, but it buckles under the weight and leaves him stuck. After chaining the tires, he shifts repeatedly between forward and reverse to build up enough momentum to break loose and continue his trip.
| 125 | 7 | "Into the Fire" | September 15, 2016 |
Mark sends Steph on her first solo run, taking building materials to Pikangikum. Her truck is close to the maximum weight allowed on the ice crossing, whose length and covering of fresh snow cause her great alarm as she starts across. She finishes the run safely, her confidence restored. Darrell drops off a load of school supplies in South Indian Lake, the first leg of a one-day triple run that will take him to Lac Brochet and then Brochet. After making the second stop, he ventures onto the rough roads in the northernmost portion of the Manitoba system. Risking a drive through a stretch of melted, boggy terrain, he reaches Brochet that same evening, drops off the last load, and hurries to leave town before the weather changes. While hauling shop supplies to Sandy Lake First Nation, Lisa battles through a road that has melted into mud and slush. Smoke begins to pour from under the hood, caused by dirt and grass kicked up from her wheels and igniting on the hot exhaust pipe. After cleaning out the debris, she finishes the run to bring in the community's final load of the season. Todd marks his birthday by hauling building supplies to Big Trout Lake along a road that has just opened for the first time all season. As he reaches its start, though, he finds that it has just been closed again. He spends the day on the roadside, building a campfire and calling his wife at home. The road is reopened that night, leaving Todd with no choice but to drive on and face its ice crossing alone as the first driver to attempt it. He reaches the other side, but is forced to stop when the leaf spring connected to his front axle breaks.
| 126 | 8 | "Hell Niño" | September 22, 2016 |
After spending a night stuck on the road to Big Trout Lake, Todd ties down the broken ends of his spring with a tow strap and is able to start moving again. The rough road puts severe stress on his repair job and the truck's one intact spring; once he delivers his load, the return trip proves equally hazardous. That night, he hits a rock that breaks his Jerry-rigged leaf spring completely and punches a hole in his radiator, leaving him with no choice but to call Polar and have the truck towed back to Winnipeg. Taking a last-minute haul to Sandy Lake, Lisa finds herself the only driver on this road due to its poor condition. She ventures onto a lake crossing awash in water and slush, nearly losing traction at the opposite shore, and reaches land to continue her trip. The final stretch leaves her scrambling to keep traction and hold the road, but she muscles her way into town and finishes the run. Alex is hauling building supplies to St. Theresa Point, the village's last haul of the season. A thawing creek forces him to plot his path across very carefully, and he ends up having to back up onto it after caching a tire in a snowbank on the other side. His second crossing attempt damages the ice even further, but he clears the obstacle and continues driving. Low trailer height and large bumps combine to shake some of the materials off the trailer; he re-secures the load and eases through the last few miles to bring in his load. Art picks up a load of lumber needed on Elk Island, but at the start of the ice road, he learns from other truckers that it has been shut down for four days. Mark calls him back to Winnipeg, a decision that rankles him greatly.
| 127 | 9 | "The Convoy" | September 29, 2016 |
As the season enters its final two days, the truckers scramble to deliver as many loads as possible over roads that may be closed at any time. Dispatched to Sachigo Lake with building supplies, Art chooses the shorter of two available paths, but must face a risky 4-mile ice crossing. While on the ice, he hears a loud clang and sees smoke coming from the hood of his truck. He is forced to stop on the ice, hoping the damage isn't too severe, only to find a radiator leak and a destroyed fan. His truck is unable to turnover, but does so after a few minutes, much to Art's relief, but he realizes he has no choice but to continue on and hope that his engine will not overheat. He limps into town and delivers the load, but the truck is so badly damaged that he cannot drive it back to Winnipeg. Meanwhile, Alex also starts for Sachigo Lake with a load of lumber. He chooses the much longer path, but has to contend with a mile-long ice crossing that begins to crumble under his wheels. He makes it across safely and inches his way toward his destination. In Winnipeg, Mark gets a last-minute call to deliver several loads of building supplies to North Caribou Lake First Nation. Needing manpower and experience, he calls in Todd, Steph, Darrell, and Lisa and rides with them as backup. The road has been reopened just for this convoy, but the ice has almost completely melted away to expose mud and rocks throughout. When Steph slides into a ditch, Todd pulls her out and the two hurry to catch up to the others. Darrell and Mark, riding together, quarrel over how to negotiate the road hazards; Darrell gets fed up and lets Mark drive for a while, eventually admitting some respect for his technique. The cab suddenly begins to fill with smoke, and Mark jumps out to flag Lisa down for help.
| 128 | 10 | "The Final Ride" | October 6, 2016 |
Mark and Darrell put out the fire in Darrell's truck, caused by an electrical short, and Mark patches the wiring so the convoy can keep moving. A steep, muddy hill forces Mark to use the loader he has brought along to push them to the top; Todd, the last to go, has the hardest time of them all since his load is the heaviest. Later they come to a lake crossing that proves to be dangerously thin, but all four drivers decide to push on, with Mark taking the loader off Darrell's trailer and driving it himself to redistribute the weight. They cautiously venture out, the ice cracking badly under their wheels, and reach the opposite shore to finish the run to North Caribou Lake. Alex arrives in Sachigo Lake to deliver his load and agrees to take both Art and his damaged truck back to Winnipeg. The overhead power lines in town are too low for Art's truck to clear them on Alex's trailer, and he risks his life by pushing them aside with an aluminum shovel and a wooden broom so Alex can drive underneath. That night, as they are about to get off the winter road and onto the highway, Alex's truck develops an air leak that locks the brakes. The problem is a broken valve, for which they improvise a patch with a piece of wood, and they resume the trip to close out their season.

== Returning drivers ==
Debogorski, Darrell Ward, Kelly, Dewey and Burke continue driving for their respective companies. Mark Kohaykewych briefly drives Darrell's truck, as well as a heavy loader to push trucks over steep hills during the two-part season finale convoy.

This was Darrell Ward's final season, as he was killed in a plane crash on August 28, 2016.

== New driver ==
- Stephanie "Steph Hammer Down" Custance: Steph, 22, is a first-year ice road trucker with less than one year of commercial driving experience. Mark hires her to work for Polar, deciding that his need for drivers outweighs the problems he sees during her road test. She has a five-year-old son.

== Route and destinations ==
- Manitoba/Ontario/Alberta ice roads: In addition to previously seen destinations in Manitoba and Ontario, two new destinations were added in Season 10: Fort Chipewyan, Alberta and Summer Beaver, Ontario.
