= Ice Road Truckers season 8 =

Season of television series

Ice Road Truckers
- Season 8
- No. of episodes: 12

Release
- Original network: History
- Original release: July 7 – September 28, 2014

Season chronology
- ← Previous; Season 7 Next → Season 9

This is a list of Ice Road Truckers Season 8 episodes.

This season all drivers from season 7 return to Winnipeg, and the same companies, Polar and VP Express, are shown. This is also the first season in which the program is a US / Canadian co-production, with Prospero Media and Shaw Media (owners of the Canadian History franchise) producing the show with Original Productions and History (as seen in the end credits of each episode). Season 8 premiered on July 7, 2014.

== Episodes ==
No. overall	No. in season	Title	Original release date
97	1	"The Gathering Storm"	July 7, 2014
In Winnipeg, Polar and VP renew their rivalry as the 2013–14 North American cold wave closes in on Canada. Art, Darrell, and Lisa, all driving for Polar again, start out with construction supplies bound for Garden Hill. Darrell and Lisa get an early start, seeing "thin ice" warning signs on the first ice crossing they encounter, while Art is later to set out and hurries to catch up. A wrong turn takes him 12 hours out of his way. That night, Darrell and Lisa find a jackknifed truck blocking the road; Darrell berates the inexperienced driver for his mistake, then pulls him free with Lisa's help so they can keep moving. They reach Garden Hill the next morning, and Art follows their path after backtracking through the night. Todd has left VP to work for Polar, and he sets out with a grader needed in the village of North Haven Lodge, 500 miles away at the north end of the winter roads. The newly opened crossing over Split Lake unnerves him due to vibrations in his load; he reaches land safely, only to find a bumpy road that shakes his truck just as badly. He slides off the road and into a snowbank, leaving him stranded for the night, and he is unable to call for help on his satellite phone. Meanwhile, Alex has joined VP, which has secured a contract to haul construction supplies needed for an arena to be built in St. Theresa Point. He and Hugh take the first loads, with Hugh being the first to deliver that night. At the last ice crossing before his destination, Alex pauses to reflect on the danger facing him due to his truck's weight, then eases across to bring in his load.
98	2	"Rushin' Roulette"	July 14, 2014
Todd remains stuck in the ditch until late in the day, when a passing road crew spends several hours pulling him loose. He makes his delivery to North Haven Lodge that night, 36 hours behind schedule; once he returns to Winnipeg, Mark sends him and Darrell on a new run to Utik Lake. Darrell, hauling a snowcat, bristles at being told to follow Todd, taking a grader, and the two begin to needle each other as they drive. At the drop-off site, there is no equipment to use for unloading and Todd decides to drive the equipment off the trailers himself, nearly crashing the snowcat in the process. Having made his delivery in Garden Hill, Art is hurrying back to Winnipeg when he loses electrical power. Finding that snow buildup has shorted out his batteries, he covers them with a piece of cardboard and is able to get moving again. Once he returns to Winnipeg, Mark reprimands him for his dangerous wrong turn but sends him to Deer Lake, Ontario with a load of construction supplies. He is following Lisa along this route as she hauls a load of her own. During a 6-mile lake crossing, Lisa's engine begins to struggle; she barely makes it across before her truck shuts down completely to clean its air filter. At Deer Lake, Lisa takes charge of a loader and, despite her lack of experience, unloads both trailers so she and Art can head back. Bringing a firetruck back from St. Theresa Point, Alex stops at an ice crossing to read from his Bible before easing onto it. He spots several danger flags planted on the ice to either side of the path and must watch his speed in order to safely climb the hill on the far side. He reaches Winnipeg just ahead of the season's first major storm.
99	3	"Into the Vortex"	July 21, 2014
As the storm hits central Canada, Lisa is hauling construction supplies to Big Trout Lake, Ontario. Despite hearing of other drivers' decisions to stop and wait it out, she pushes on and soon finds herself the only one still on the road. Missing the final turn off the road, she tries to turn around but gets stuck in the snow; chaining her tires allows her to break loose and backtrack 100 miles to her destination. Art is taking his own load of supplies to Deer Lake; he breaks one set of tire chains while climbing a hill, but decides to keep going despite the reduced traction. Partway through an ice crossing thickly covered with snow, he finds water seeping up through weak spots caused by the snow's weight. He crosses safely and brings his load in. On the return trip, he and Lisa both get stuck on uphill runs, no longer having the weight of a load on their trailers to help provide traction. On the road to Winnipeg, Todd finds himself facing near-zero visibility and a stubborn cargo hatch as he makes a dangerous lake crossing. In Winnipeg, VP is hired to repossess a trailer that Polar rented but never returned the previous year. Alex is dispatched to Red Sucker Lake to pick it up, but Mark learns of the attempt and calls associates in the area. As a result, the village police stop Alex that night and order him to leave. Finding that his truck will not start, Darrell sends it to the shop and voices his frustration to Mark.
100	4	"Snow Bound"	July 28, 2014
As the storm begins to subside, Vlad learns of Alex's thwarted effort to repossess the Polar trailer, while Alex has stopped on the road outside Red Sucker Lake to await instructions. He eventually gets clearance from VP and makes the pickup, annoying Mark greatly, but must now face a low fuel supply and a rough, slick road as he drives back to Winnipeg. Meanwhile, Todd is making a 600-mile run to bring lumber to Muskrat Dam, Ontario. The load is stacked high enough on his trailer to put him at risk of toppling due to wind forces. On a steep downhill run, he is forced to accelerate in order to cross a narrow bridge and climb the hill beyond it; he briefly loses traction in the deep snow, but muscles his truck over the peak. A collapsed lake crossing forces him to follow an unused detour trail around the shore, with a crossing of its own, and he delivers his cargo that night. Taking construction supplies to Big Trout Lake, Darrell encounters a poorly maintained ice crossing with a thick layer of snow. He eases onto the ice, knowing the potential danger, and reaches the other side to face the rough road of the final stretch. He spots Lisa, who has now been stuck for nearly 24 hours, and pulls her loose before completing his run. Later that night, a passing truck tries to free Art, only to have its bumper ripped half off; however, a grader in the area quickly pulls him back onto the road.
101	5	"The Storm Troopers"	August 3, 2014
A passing driver pulls Alex out of the snow so he can continue his drive back from Red Sucker Lake. Low on fuel and with the next town 20 miles ahead, he nurses his truck across a nighttime ice crossing only to run dry shortly afterward. A passing driver tows him into town so he can refuel and make it back to Winnipeg. Todd, also returning to Winnipeg, gets stuck in the deep snowdrifts that have covered an ice crossing. He hurries to dig out his tires and put on chains so he can get moving again, but later comes across three trucks that are stuck and blocking the road. Not wanting to wait several hours for a road crew to free them, Todd first tries unsuccessfully to pull them loose, then veers around them off the road and continues on. On the way to Muskrat Dam with construction supplies, Lisa cautiously navigates an ice crossing that has just been reopened after the storm. That night, she finds that one of her suspension straps has broken, leaving her air bags vulnerable on a steep hill. However, she reaches the top without incident and brings her load in. As Art returns to Winnipeg, he is forced to make a dangerous ice crossing in near-total whiteout conditions. At an inspection station, he is fined $490 and suspended for three days as a result of violations in his logbook; he cannot drive back to Winnipeg and must wait for someone to come and pick up both him and his truck. In Winnipeg, Darrell quits Polar after arguing with Mark over how few loads he has pulled this season. A phone call to his son persuades him to stay in the area and look for other trucking opportunities.
102	6	"The Lone Wolf"	August 10, 2014
Deciding to go into business for himself, Darrell rents a truck and cargo bay from a local trucker in hopes of competing with Polar. His first load, from one of Mark's clients, consists of culvert sections bound for Wasagamack, and he flaunts it in front of Mark on his way out of Winnipeg. He decides to take his chances on an untested lake crossing rather than take a long detour around it, and he delivers the load that night. Lisa is hauling construction supplies to Cat Lake, Ontario, 500 miles from Winnipeg. Many trucks have wrecked on this road's twists and turns, and she passes one that has been abandoned since the previous year. Easing over a rickety bridge barely wide enough for her truck, she is relieved to reach her destination safely that night. A set of broken tire chains complicates Todd's run to deliver groceries to Big Trout Lake, but he brings it in on time to resupply the village for the coming year. Taking a load of structural steel to St. Theresa Point, Alex finds that the scrap wood pieces he has used to stabilize the cargo (dunnage) are giving way, but decides to push on. He must speed up on a lake crossing in order to climb the hill on the far side. Hugh starts out for St. Theresa Point with a car crusher, but its weight and low ground clearance pose a challenge on the rough road ahead. Once both drivers bring in their loads, they meet with the local First Nations chief and give him several gifts to thank him for letting them drive through his tribe's land.
103	7	"Blazing the Trail"	August 17, 2014
In Winnipeg, Darrell arranges to haul a generator to Wasagamack, but Mark tracks him down at his shop and angrily confronts him before he can get moving. The slick road and tight corners cause his trailer to skid in several places, but he successfully delivers the cargo. VP secures a contract to haul 150 loads to Oxford House, a job that had gone to Polar the previous season. Alex takes the first load of the contract, a set of septic tanks, and brings it in after navigating the tight corners of the final stretch. With his suspension now over, Art reports in to see Mark, who cautions him against making any further mistakes that could hurt Polar's record or finances. He takes a load to Cat Lake and delivers it without trouble, but the road back has been shut down and he must take a different route with several narrow, rickety bridges. At his final fuel stop, he discovers that he has lost one of his new tire chains; once back in the Polar yard, he sneaks a chain from the shop onto his truck to cover up the loss. Lisa and Todd are taking building materials to Poplar Hill, Ontario. The route includes an ice crossing over 2 miles wide, and it is already weakened by the rising late-season temperatures. That night, Lisa discovers a leak in her engine's cylinders that is robbing her truck of power; after she and Todd deliver their loads, she calls Mark and gets instructions to bring it back to Winnipeg. A steep uphill slope brings her to a halt, but Todd finds a grader parked at the roadside and uses it to tow her over the top so she can limp to the Polar shop. She, Art, and Todd later meet at a bar to relax and talk about recent events, including Darrell's exit from Polar.
104	8	"Highway to Hell"	August 24, 2014
On his way to Deer Lake, Art stops at North Spirit Lake, Ontario to deliver part of a load of lumber. However, bad directions to the drop-off point send him in circles until his map sets him straight. With that cargo delivered, he drives on and braves a late-night ice crossing to complete the second half of the delivery. Darrell also heads toward Deer Lake with a load of building supplies, but the fresh snowfall causes him to skid badly on the corners. He brings it in ahead of schedule the next morning and comes across Art, and the two talk briefly about Darrell's new business. Lisa and Todd head for Utik Lake with pontoon boats and building supplies, respectively, and must force their way through the soft snow without losing control. They venture onto a newly opened river crossing, even though the fast currents have led to uneven and possibly incomplete freezing; at the other side, Lisa fails to climb a steep hill and has to back onto the ice for another attempt. Her third try is a success, with risky speed and a bit of advice from Todd, and they finish their run. The car crusher Hugh delivered to St. Theresa Point is now being used to compact abandoned vehicles on the winter roads, and Alex takes on a load of them to haul back to Winnipeg. That night, he skids on a corner and runs into a snowbank; he tries to dig out, but soon becomes tired and spends six hours waiting for a passing truck to pull him free. He reaches Winnipeg just before sunrise.
105	9	"Flirtin' with Disaster"	September 7, 2014
In Winnipeg, Darrell hires his son Reno and takes him on a delivery run to Big Trout Lake to get him accustomed to the winter roads. Once they reach the end of the road's pavement section, Darrell lets Reno drive, cautioning him about the ice crossings and other hazards. They bring the load in on time the next morning. Returning to Winnipeg from Deer Lake, Art gets stuck on the same hill that cost him over one full day earlier in the season. This time, though, he climbs it on his second try with the help of his tire chains. That night, he jackknifes briefly at a corner, damaging his truck's bodywork; once he reaches Winnipeg and tells Mark the next morning, he is sent home for the day so Mark can decide whether or not to fire him. Meanwhile, Hugh is taking a load of home supplies to Pauingassi, along a road that has already started to melt back into swampland. He swerves and slides into a snowbank to avoid an oncoming truck; the other driver quickly pulls him loose so he can drive on. After completing a melting ice crossing, he successfully makes the delivery. Lisa and Todd make another run to Utik Lake, carrying a pontoon boat and construction supplies, and must face the fragile ice crossing again. This time, both drivers make it over the hill on the far side in one try to deliver their loads to the site of an airport under construction the next day. At the crew foreman's invitation, they set off a string of explosive charges to help clear land for one of the runways.
106	10	"Icing on the Lake"	September 14, 2014
In Winnipeg, Mark decides to keep Art on the job in order to keep loads moving during the final days of the season. He sends Art on a run to Lac Brochet, with Joey Barnes escorting him on the final, most dangerous leg – a plan that rankles him greatly at first. However, he changes his opinion once he meets Joey in person, and the two help each other through the rough roads to finish their delivery. Darrell and Reno are hauling building supplies and a work truck to Big Trout Lake, with Reno driving. A trailing convoy blames them for scattering fresh snow across the road, leading to a heated confrontation between those drivers and the Wards. Tempers flare briefly between father and son afterward, but the mood quickly improves and they bring in the load. Alex starts for St. Theresa Point with a load of concrete, despite an electrical problem with his truck. The trouble worsens just before he reaches an ice crossing that night, but he manages to reach the other side and limp to his destination. Hauling school buses to Utik Lake, Lisa and Todd ease across the ice crossing, whose condition has become even more unpredictable due to rising temperatures. They fall behind schedule on the slick road and find a long traffic jam caused by a spun-out truck. It takes several hours to clear the blockage, and Lisa and Todd drive all night to reach Utik Lake on time the next morning.
107	11	"Journey to the End of the Earth"	September 21, 2014
Art, Lisa, and Todd are dispatched to Fort Severn, Ontario, following a 500-mile winter road whose length qualifies it for the Guinness Book of World Records. They are carrying building materials and equipment, as well as extra fuel and emergency supplies. On the third day of the trip, after dealing with slick corners and a rapidly melting 5-mile river crossing, a check of the loader on Lisa's truck reveals that its batteries are dead. Even though the three now have no means of pulling themselves free if they get stuck, they push on. Later that day, Todd devises a scheme to jump-start the loader, and the three continue on with the machine now running. Darrell and Reno start out for Fort Severn as well, driving separate trucks so that Reno can make his first solo run. Reno ignores Darrell's advice to slow down; as the two cross the river, Darrell notices a loose strap on Reno's trailer that is at risk of snagging on his axles. Once on the other side, they stop so Reno can secure it. Reno's speed causes his load to shift on the trailer, leaving it at risk of overbalancing, but he insists on fixing the problem himself and succeeds. The two catch up to Art, Lisa, and Todd on the final stretch of the trip, the morning of the fourth day, and all five reach Fort Severn safely. All but Darrell deliver their loads; Art, Todd, and Reno head for Winnipeg, while Darrell asks Lisa to follow him another 150 miles to Peawanuck First Nation so he can deliver the groceries he has been hauling. On the other hand, VP is trying to complete as many short-haul deliveries as possible near the season's end. Hugh delivers home supplies to Pauingassi, while Alex reaches Red Sucker Lake with construction supplies.
108	12	"World's End"	September 28, 2014
In Fort Severn, Lisa agrees to accompany Darrell to Peawanuck, risking her job. Todd disagrees with her decision, since Darrell no longer works for Polar and Lisa has the convoy's emergency equipment. Her toolbox falls off her trailer, but they retrieve it and reach Peawanuck that evening to find a celebration waiting for them. On the return trip, Lisa's truck begins to break through an ice crossing. She and Darrell quickly get the equipment off her trailer, and Darrell then pushes her truck free of the break so they can load up and resume their trip. Once the two are back in Winnipeg, Mark tells Lisa that he was originally angry with her for driving with Darrell, but now understands that she did the right thing. As Art, Reno, and Todd start the return trip to Winnipeg, they find stretches of slush and water on the road and Reno has trouble keeping pace with the others. They stop for the night after covering 400 miles that leave him sore and battered, then finish the drive the next evening to close out their season. Hauling water/sewer plant equipment to Tadoule Lake, Alex comes across an ice crossing with no posted weight limit. After negotiating it safely, he brings his load in the next morning and hurries to return to Winnipeg before the road closes. All three companies hold season-ending celebrations for their employees; Polar has topped the load count, with 171 loads to VP's 170. Lisa finds herself wondering whether to work for Polar again in the future or accept Darrell's offer of a job at his company.

== Returning drivers ==
Darrell Ward, Art Burke, and Lisa Kelly drive for Polar. Todd Dewey switches from VP Express to Polar. Alex Debogorski drives for longtime rival Hugh Rowland’s and Vlad Pleskot’s VP Express. After a tense verbal exchange with Polar owner Mark Kohaykewych, Darrell quits Polar in episode 5, frustrated with repeated truck breakdowns and how few loads he has been given, and goes into business for himself. Joey Barnes appears in episode 10 to escort Burke on a delivery run through the Manitoba wilderness, after Burke avoided being fired after jack-knifing his truck the previous trip. Also in episode 5, Burke was fined $490 and "shut down" (suspended from driving) for three days, due to multiple log-book infringements and over-working, from being stuck in the snowstorm on the previous round trip. In episode 12, Kelly, Burke, Dewey, Darrell and Reno all make it to Fort Severn, while Kelly decides to support Darrell and help him go further into Peawanuck. Kelly was not censured by Mark for her actions, as it was "a morally and ethically right thing to do," and she was offered a job by Darrell for the next season; she was undecided on switching sides.

This was Hugh Rowland's final season, as he was involved in a 2014 pickup accident.

== New driver ==
- Reno Ward: Darrell Ward’s son, he was hired to help his father in episode 9.

== Route and destinations ==
- Manitoba/Ontario ice roads: Two new destinations in northwestern Ontario: Fort Severn and Peawanuck.

== Final load counts ==
- Polar: 171
- VP: 170
- Total: 341
